= List of non-marine molluscs of Bulgaria =

Location of Bulgaria

There are numerous species of molluscs living in the wild in Bulgaria. This list covers only the non-marine species.

== Freshwater gastropods ==
Neritidae

- Theodoxus danubialis (C. Pfeiffer, 1828)
- Theodoxus fluviatilis (Linnaeus, 1758)
- Theodoxus pallasi Linholm, 1924
- Theodoxus transversalis (C. Pfeiffer, 1828) - striped nerite

Viviparidae

- Viviparus acerosus (Bourguignat, 1862)
- Viviparus contectus (Millet, 1813)
- Viviparus viviparus (Linnaeus, 1758)

Melanopsidae

- Melanopsis parreyssi Philippi, 1847
- Esperiana (Esperiana) esperi (A. Férussac, 1823)
- Esperiana (Microcolpia) daudebartii (Prevost, 1821)
- Holandriana holandrii (C. Pfeiffer, 1828)

Pyrgulidae

- Turricaspia (Laevicaspia) lincta (Milaschewitch, 1908)
- Turricaspia (Clessiniola) variabilis (Eichwald, 1838)

Bithyniidae

- Bithynia (Bithynia) danubialis Glöer et Georgiev, 2012
- Bithynia (Bithynia) tentaculata (Linnaeus, 1758)
- Bithynia (Codiella) rumelica Wohlberedt, 1911

Bythinellidae

- Bythinella aneliae Georgiev et Stoycheva, 2011
- Bythinella angelovi Glöer et Georgiev, 2011
- Bythinella dedovi Glöer et Georgiev, 2011
- Bythinella dierckingi Glöer et Georgiev, 2011
- Bythinella elenae Glöer et Georgiev, 2011
- Bythinella fabiae Georgiev, Schneppart & Dedov, 2022
- Bythinella gloeeri Georgiev, 2009
- Bythinella hansboetersi Glöer et Pešiæ, 2006
- Bythinella izvorica Glöer et Georgiev, 2011
- Bythinella kleptuzica Glöer et Georgiev, 2011
- Bythinella margritae Glöer et Georgiev, 2011
- Bythinella markovi Glöer et Georgiev, 2009
- Bythinella ravnogorica Glöer et Georgiev, 2009
- Bythinella rhodopensis Glöer et Georgiev, 2011
- Bythinella rilaensis Georgiev et Glöer, 2013
- Bythinella slaveyae Glöer et Georgiev, 2011
- Bythinella smolyanica Glöer et Georgiev, 2011
- Bythinella srednogorica Glöer et Georgiev, 2009
- Bythinella stoychevae Georgiev, 2011
- Bythinella temelkovi Georgiev & Glöer, 2014
- Bythinella valkanovi Glöer et Georgiev, 2011
- Bythinella vidinovae Dedov, Taseva & Georgiev, 2021
- Bythinella walkeri Glöer et Georgiev, 2009
- Strandzhia bythinellopenia Georgiev et Glöer, 2013

Hydrobiidae

- Balkanica yankovi Georgiev, 2011
- Balkanospeum schniebsae (Georgiev, 2011)
- Caspia milae Boeters, Glöer, Georgiev & Dedov, 2015
- Cavernisa zaschevi (Angelov, 1959)
- Devetakia apostoloui Georgiev, Dedov & Taseva, 2022
- Devetakia krushunica Georgiev et Glöer, 2011
- Devetakia mandrica Georgiev, 2012
- Devetakia pandurskii Georgiev et Glöer, 2011
- Devetakia veselinae Georgiev & Glöer, 2015
- Devetakiola devetakium (Georgiev et Glöer, 2013)
- Gloeria bulgarica Georgiev, Dedov et Varadinova, 2012
- Grossuana angeltsekovi Glöer et Georgiev, 2009
- Grossuana codreanui (Grossu, 1946)
- Grossuana derventica Georgiev et Glöer, 2013
- Grossuana falniowskii Georgiev, Glöer, Dedov & Irikov, 2015
- Grossuana slavyanica Georgiev et Glöer, 2013
- Grossuana thracica Glöer et Georgiev, 2009
- “Hauffenia” lucidula (Angelov, 1967)
- Hydrobia acuta Draparnaud, 1805
- Insignia macrostoma Angelov, 1972
- Kolevia bulgarica Georgiev & Glöer, 2015
- Microstygia deltchevi Georgiev & Glöer, 2015
- Plagigeyeria procerula (Angelov, 1965)
- Pontobelgrandiella angelovi (Pintér, 1968)
- Pontobelgrandiella bachkovoensis (Glöer et Georgiev, 2009)
- Pontobelgrandiella bulgarica (Angelov, 1972)
- Pontobelgrandiella bureschi (Angelov, 1976)
- Pontobelgrandiella delevae (Georgiev & Glöer, 2015)
- Pontobelgrandiella dobrostanica (Glöer et Georgiev, 2009)
- Pontobelgrandiella hessei (A. Wagner, 1927)
- Pontobelgrandiella lomica (Georgiev & Glöer, 2015)
- Pontobelgrandiella maarensis (Georgiev, 2013)
- Pontobelgrandiella nitida (Angelov, 1972)
- Pontobelgrandiella pandurskii (Georgiev, 2011)
- Pontobelgrandiella pussila (Angelov, 1959)
- Pontobelgrandiella stanimirae (Georgiev, 2011)
- Pontobelgrandiella tanevi Georgiev, 2013
- Pontobelgrandiella zagoraensis (Glöer et Georgiev, 2009)
- Radomaniola aytosensis (Georgiev, 2012)
- Radomaniola bulgarica Glöer et Georgiev, 2009
- Radomaniola radostinae (Georgiev, 2012)
- Radomaniola rhodopensis Glöer et Georgiev, 2009
- Radomaniola strandzhica Georgiev et Glöer, 2013
- Stoyanovia stoyanovi (Georgiev, 2013)

Lithoglyphidae

- Lithoglyphus naticoides (C. Pfeiffer, 1828)
- Lithoglyphus pyramidatus von Möllendorf, 1873

Moitessieriidae

- Bythiospeum bechevi Georgiev & Glöer, 2013
- Bythiospeum buresi (A. Wagner, 1928)
- Bythiospeum copiosum (Angelov, 1972)
- Bythiospeum dourdeni Georgiev, 2012
- Bythiospeum iltchoi Georgiev & Glöer, 2015
- Bythiospeum iltchokolevi Georgiev & Glöer, 2015
- Bythiospeum jazzi Georgiev & Glöer, 2013
- Bythiospeum juliae Georgiev & Glöer, 2015
- Bythiospeum kolevi Georgiev, 2013
- Bythiospeum pandurskii Georgiev, 2012
- Bythiospeum simovi Georgiev, 2013
- Iglica acicularis Angelov, 1959

Tateidae

- Potamopyrgus antipodarum (J. E. Gray, 1843)

Valvatidae

- Valvata (Valvata) cristata O. F. Müller, 1774
- Valvata (Tropidina) macrostoma (Mörch, 1864) - large-mouthed valve snail
- Valvata (Cincinna) piscinalis (O. F. Müller, 1774) - European valve snail
- Borysthenia naticina (Menke, 1845)

Acroloxidae

- Acroloxus lacustris (Linnaeus, 1758)

Lymnaeidae

- Galba truncatula (O. F. Müller, 1774)
- Stagnicola corvus (Gmelin, 1791)
- Stagnicola montenegrinus Glöer et Pešić, 2009
- Stagnicola palustris (O. F. Müller, 1774)
- Ampullaceana balthica (Linnaeus, 1758)
- Ampullaceana lagotis (Schrank, 1803)
- Peregriana peregra (Rossmässler, 1835)
- Radix auricularia (Linnaeus, 1758)
- Myxas glutinosa (O. F. Müller, 1774)
- Lymnaea stagnalis (Linnaeus, 1758)

Physidae

- Physa fontinalis (Linnaeus, 1758)
- Physella acuta (Draparnaud, 1805)
- Aplexa hypnorum (Linnaeus, 1758)

Planorbidae

- Planorbarius corneus (Linnaeus, 1758)
- Planorbis carinatus O. F. Müller, 1774
- Planorbis planorbis (Linnaeus, 1758)
- Anisus (Anisus) leucostoma (Millet, 1813)
- Anisus (Anisus) septemgyratus (Rossmässler, 1835)
- Anisus (Anisus) spirorbis (Linnaeus, 1758)
- Anisus (Disculifer) vortex (Linnaeus, 1758)
- Anisus (Disculifer) vorticulus (Troschel, 1834)
- Bathyomphalus contortus (Linnaeus, 1758)
- Gyraulus (Gyraulus) albus (O. F. Müller, 1774)
- Gyraulus (Armiger) crista (Linnaeus, 1758)
- Gyraulus (Lamorbis) piscinarum Bourguignat, 1852
- Gyraulus (Torquis) parvus (Alder, 1838)
- Hippeutis complanatus (Linnaeus, 1758)
- Segmentina nitida (O. F. Müller, 1774)
- Ferrissia californica (Tryon, 1863)
- Ancylus fluviatilis O. F. Müller, 1774
- Ancylus recurvus Martens, 1873

== Land gastropods ==
Aciculidae

- Platyla oedogyra (Paladilhe, 1868)
- Platyla orthostoma Jankiewicz, 1979
- Platyla polita (Hartmann, 1840)

Pomatiidae

- Pomatias elegans (O.F. Müller, 1774)
- Pomatias rivularis (Eichwald, 1829)

Ellobiidae

- Carychium minimum O.F. Müller, 1774
- Carychium tridentatum (Risso, 1826)
- Myosotella myosotis (Draparnaud, 1801)

Succineidae

- Succinea putris (Linnaeus, 1758)
- Succinella oblonga (Draparnaud, 1801)
- Oxyloma elegans (Risso, 1826)
- Oxyloma sarsii (Esmark, 1886)

Cochlicopidae

- Cochlicopa lubrica (O.F. Müller, 1774)
- Cochlicopa lubricella (Porro, 1838)
- Cochlicopa nitens (Gallenstein, 1852)

Argnidae

- Agardhiella macrodonta (Hesse, 1916)
- Agardhiella parreysii (L. Pfeiffer, 1848)
- Agardhiella rumelica (Hesse, 1916)

Chondrinidae

- Chondrina arcadica (Reinhardt, 1881)
- Chondrina avenacea (Bruguière, 1729)
- Granaria frumentum (Draparnaud, 1801)

Lauriidae

- Lauria cylindracea (Da Costa, 1778)
- Leiostyla schweigeri Götting, 1963

Orculidae

- Orcula zilchi Urbański, 1960
- Orculella bulgarica (Hesse, 1915)
- Pagodulina subdola brabeneci Hudec et Vašatko, 1971
- Sphyradium doliolum (Bruguiere, 1792)

Pupillidae

- Pupilla muscorum (Linnaeus, 1758)
- Pupilla sterri (Voith, 1838)
- Pupilla triplicata (Studer, 1820)

Pyramidulidae

- Pyramidula pusilla (Vallot, 1801)

Spelaeodiscidae

- Aspasita bulgarica Subai & Dedov, 2008
- Aspasita triaria triaria (Rossmässler, 1839)

Truncatellinidae

- Truncatellina claustralis (Gredler, 1856)
- Truncatellina costulata (Nilsson, 1822)
- Truncatellina cylindrica (Férussac, 1807)

Valloniidae

- Acanthinula aculeata (Müller, 1774)
- Vallonia costata O. F. Müller, 1774)
- Vallonia enniensis (Gredler, 1856)
- Vallonia excentrica Sterki, 1892 - eccentric vallonia
- Vallonia pulchella (O. F. Müller, 1774) - lovely vallonia

Vertiginidae

- Vertigo alpestris (Alder, 1830)
- Vertigo angustior Jeffreys, 1830 - narrow-mouthed whorl snail
- Vertigo antivertigo (Draparnaud, 1801)
- Vertigo moulinsiana (Dupuy, 1849) - Desmoulin's whorl snail
- Vertigo pusilla O. F. Müller, 1774
- Vertigo pygmaea (Draparnaud, 1801) - crested vertigo
- Vertigo substriata (Jeffreys, 1830)

Enidae

- Chondrula macedonica A. J. Wagner, 1915
- Chondrula microtraga (Rossmässler, 1839)
- Chondrula tricuspidata (Küster, 1841)
- Chondrula tridens (Müller, 1774)
- Chondrus zebra tantalus (L. Pfeiffer, 1868)
- Ena montana (Draparnaud, 1801)
- Eubrephulus bicallosus (L. Pfeiffer, 1847)
- Leucomastus kindermanni (L. Pfeiffer, 1853)
- Mastus rossmaessleri (L. Pfeiffer, 1846)
- Mastus carneolus (Mousson, 1863)
- Mastus etuberculatus (Frauenfeld, 1867)
- Merdigera obscura (O. F. Müller, 1774)
- Multidentula ovularis (Olivier, 1801)
- Multidentula squalina (Rossmässler, 1848)
- Pseudochondrula seductilis (Rossmässler, 1846)
- Zebrina detrita (O. F. Müller, 1774) - striped wood snail
- Zebrina varnensis (L. Pfeiffer, 1847)

Clausiliidae

- Alinda atanasovi (Urbański, 1964) - with the subspecies atanasovi and kremenensis (Dedov, 2009)
- Alinda biplicata (Montagu, 1803) - with the subspecies biplicata, alibotushensis Dedov, 2009, euptychia (Ehrmann (in Urbański, 1960), irikovi Nordsieck, 2008, karlukovoensis Dedov, 2009, michaudiana (Pfeiffer, 1848) and orientalis Nordsieck, 2008
- Alinda fallax (Rossmässler, 1836)
- Alinda golesnicensis Wagner, 1914
- Alinda vratzatica (Likharev, 1972)
- Alinda wagneri (Wagner, 1911) - with the subspecies wagneri and petrohanica (Urbański, 1969)
- Balea eninskoensis (Irikov, 2006)
- Balea kaeufeli (Brandt, 1961)
- Bulgarica bulgariensis (L. Pfeiffer, 1848) - with the subspecies bulgariensis, intricata (Mousson, 1859) and osmanica (Westerlund, 1884)
- Bulgarica denticulata thessalonica (Rossmässler, 1839)
- Bulgarica fraudigera (Rossmässler, 1839)
- Bulgarica fritillaria (Frivaldszky, 1835)
- Bulgarica gabrovnitsana Ivanov, 2006
- Bulgarica hiltrudae Nordsieck, 1974
- Bulgarica pseudofraudigera Nordsieck, 1973
- Bulgarica trimontsiana Ivanov, 2006
- Bulgarica varnensis (L. Pfeiffer, 1848)
- Bulgarica vetusta (Rossmässler, 1836)
- Bulgarica urbanskii Nordsieck, 1973 - with the subspecies urbanskii and paganella Nordsieck, 1974
- Carinigera buresi Wagner, 1928 - with the subspecies buresi, damjanovi (Likharev, 1972) and dramaensis (Nordsieck, 1977)
- Carinigera schuetti Brandt, 1962
- Clausilia pumila pumila Pfeiffer, 1828
- Cochlodina laminata (Montagu, 1803) - with the subspecies laminata and pardita (Westerlund, 1892)
- Dobatia goettingi (Brandt, 1961)
- Euxina circumdata (Pfeiffer, 1848)
- Euxina persica paulhessei (Lindholm, 1925)
- Galeata schwerzenbachii (Pfeiffer, 1848)
- Idyla castalia boschi Nordsieck, 1973
- Macedonica brabeneci Nordsieck, 1977 - with the subspecies brabeneci and prismatica Dedov, 2012
- Macedonica dobrostanica Irikov, 2012
- Macedonica hartmuti Irikov, 2003
- Macedonica frauenfeldi (Rossmässler, 1856) - with the subspecies regia Nordsieck, 1977, riedeli Urbański, 1977, sigma (Westerlund, 1884) and tau Nordsieck, 1977
- Macedonica marginata (Rossmässler, 1835) - with the subspecies marginata, balcanica (Wagner, 1927), frivaldskyana (Rossmässler, 1839) and major (Rossmässler, 1839)
- Macedonica martae Sajó, 1968
- Macedonica pinteri Sajó, 1968
- Macedonica pirinensis Jaeckel, 1954
- Macedonica zilchi Urbański, 1972
- Mentissela rebeli (Sturany, 1897)
- Micridyla pinteri (Nordsieck, 1973)
- Laciniaria bajula (Schmidt, 1868) - with the subspecies bajula, lunella Nordsieck, 1973 and mursalicae (Urbański, 1969)
- Laciniaria macilenta (Rossmässler, 1842)
- Laciniaria plicata (Draparnaud, 1801) - with the subspecies plicata, kueprijae Nordsieck, 1973 and rhodopendsis Nordsieck, 2008
- Ruthenica filograna (Rossmässler, 1836)
- Serrulina serrulata (Pfeiffer, 1847)
- Vestia ranojevici ranojevici (Pavlović, 1912)
- Vestia roschitzi (Brancsik, 1890) - with the subspecies neubertiana Dedov, 2010, nordsieckiana (Urbański, 1979) and trigonostoma (Pavlović, 1912)

Achatinidae

- Rumina decollata (Linnaeus, 1758) - decollate snail

Ferussaciidae

- Cecilioides acicula (O. F. Müller, 1774) - blind awlsnail
- Cecilioides jani (De Betta et Martinati, 1855)
- Cecilioides spelaeus (A. J. Wagner, 1914)

Discidae

- Discus perspectivus (Megerle von Mühlfeld, 1816)
- Discus rotundatus (O. F. Müller, 1774)
- Discus ruderatus (Férussac, 1821)

Helicodiscidae

- Lucilla singleyana (Pilsbry, 1889)

Punctidae

- Punctum pygmaeum (Draparnaud, 1801)

Euconulidae

- Euconulus fulvus (O. F. Müller, 1774)

Gastrodontidae

- Aegopinella pura (Alder, 1830)
- Aegopinella minor (Stabile, 1864)
- Aegopinella nitens (Michaud, 1831)
- Perpolita hammonis (Strøm, 1765)
- Zonitoides nitidus (O. F. Müller, 1774)

Oxychilidae

- Carpathica bielawskii Riedel, 1963
- Carpathica stussineri (Wagner, 1895)
- Daudebardia brevipes (Draparnaud, 1805)
- Daudebardia rufa (Draparnaud, 1805)
- Daudebardia wiktori Riedel, 1967
- Mediterranea depressa (Sterki, 1880)
- Mediterranea inopinata (Uličný, 1887)
- Mediterranea hydatina (Rossmässler, 1838)
- Morlina glabra (Rossmässler, 1835)
- Morlina urbanskii (Riedel, 1963)
- Oxychilus deilus (Bourguignat, 1857)
- Oxychilus draparnaudi (Beck, 1837)
- Oxychilus translucidus (Mortillet, 1854)
- Schistophallus camelinus (Bourguignat, 1852
- Schistophallus investigatus (Riedel, 1993)

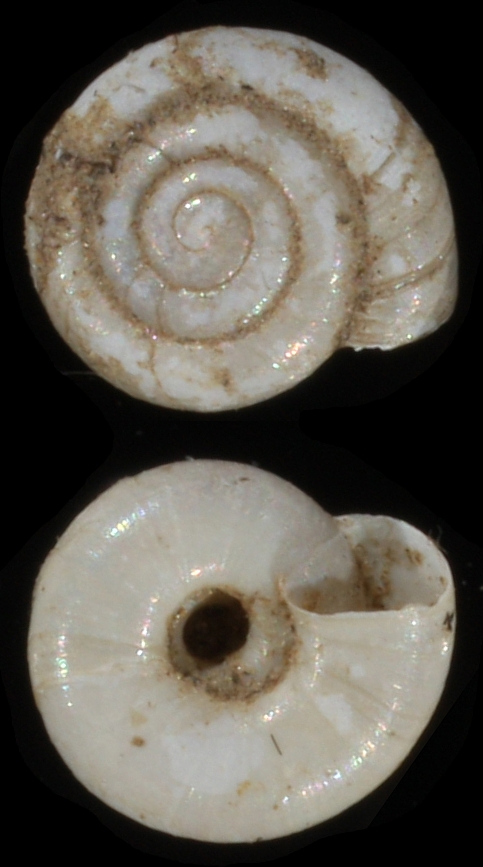
Apical and umbilical view of the shell of recently described species Vitrea vereae.

Pristilomatidae

- Vitrea contracta (Westerlund, 1871)
- Vitrea diaphana (Studer, 1820)
- Vitrea neglecta Damjanov and Pintér, 1969
- Vitrea pygmaea (O. Boettger, 1880)
- Vitrea riedeli Damjanov and Pintér, 1969
- Vitrea cf. sturanyi (Wagner, 1907)
- Vitrea subrimata (Reinhardt, 1871)
- Vitrea transsylvanica (Clessin, 1877)
- Vitrea ulrichi Georgiev & Dedov, 2014
- Vitrea vereae Irikov, Georgiev & Riedel, 2004
- Spinophallus uminskii (Riedel, 1960)

Milacidae

- Milax parvulus Wiktor, 1968
- Milax verrucosus Wiktor, 1969
- Tandonia budapestensis (Hazay, 1881)
- Tandonia cristata (Kaleniczenko, 1851)
- Tandonia kusceri (H. Wagner, 1931)
- Tandonia piriniana Wiktor, 1983
- Tandonia pinteri (Wiktor, 1975)
- Tandonia serbica (Wagner, 1931)
- Tandonia totevi (Wiktor, 1975)

Zonitidae

- Balcanodiscus frivaldskyanus (Rossmässler, 1842)

Agriolimacidae

- Deroceras agreste (Linnaeus, 1758)
- Deroceras bulgaricum Grossu, 1969
- Deroceras bureschi (H. Wagner, 1934)
- Deroceras invadens Reise, Hutchinson, Schunack & Schlitt, 2011
- Deroceras laeve (O. F. Müller, 1774)
- Deroceras pageti Grossu, 1972
- Deroceras reticulatum (Müller, 1774)
- Deroceras sturanyi (Simroth, 1894)
- Deroceras thersites (Simroth, 1886)
- Deroceras turcicum (Simroth, 1894)
- Deroceras zilchi Grossu, 1969
- Krynickillus urbanskii (Wiktor, 1971)

Limacidae

- Limacus flavus Linnaeus, 1758 - cellar slug
- Limacus maculatus (Kaleniczenko, 1851) - green cellar slug
- Limax cinereoniger Wolf, 1803 - ash-black slug
- Limax conemenosi Boettger, 1882
- Limax maximus Linnaeus, 1758 - leopard slug
- Limax macedonicus Hesse, 1928
- Limax punctulatus Sordelli, 1870
- Limax subalpinus Lessona, 1880
- Lehmania brunneri (H. Wagner, 1931)
- Lehmania horezia Grosu & Lupu, 1962
- Ambigolimax nyctelius (Bourguignat, 1861)
- Malacolimax tenellus (O. F. Müller, 1774) - lemon slug

Boettgerillidae

- Boettgerilla pallens Simroth, 1912

Vitrinidae

- Eucobresia diaphana (Draparnaud, 1805)
- Oligolimax annularis (Studer, 1820)
- Oligolimax reitteri (Boettger, 1880)
- Vitrina pellucida (Müller, 1774)

Arionidae

- Arion circumscriptus silvaticus Lohmander, 1937
- Arion fasciatus (Nilsson, 1822) - orange-banded arion
- Arion hortensis Férussac, 1819 - garden slug
- Arion intermedius Normand, 1852 - hedgehog slug
- Arion subfuscus (Draparnaud, 1805)
- Arion vulgaris Moquin-Tandon, 1855 - Spanish slug

Camaenidae

- Fruticicola fruticum (O. F. Müller, 1774)

Helicodontidae

- Lindholmiola girva (Friveldszcky, 1835)
- Lindholmiola pirinensis Jaeckel, 1954
- Soosia diodonta (Férussac, 1821)

Geomitridae

- Candidula rhabdotoides (A. J. Wagner, 1927)
- Cernuella virgata (Draparnaud, 1801)
- Cernuella cisalpina (Rossmässler, 1837)
- Cochlicella acuta (O. F. Müller, 1774)
- Helicopsis striata (O. F. Müller, 1774)
- Helicopsis dejecta (Jan, 1832)
- Helicopsis instabilis (Rossmässler, 1838)
- Xerolenta macedonica Hesse, 1928
- Xerolenta obvia (Menke, 1828)
- Xerolenta spiruloides (A. J. Wagner, 1916)
- Xeropicta krynickii (Krynicki, 1833)
- Xeropicta derbentina (Krynicki, 1836)

Helicidae

- Arianta arbustorum (Linnaeus, 1758)
- Cattania ardica Dedov et Subai, 2006
- Cattania balcanica (Kobelt, 1876)
- Cattania haberhaueri (Sturany, 1897)
- Cattania kattingeri (Knipper, 1941)
- Cattania pelia (Hesse, 1912)
- Cattania polinskii (A. J. Wagner, 1927)
- Cattania rumelica (Rossmässler, 1838)
- Cattania trizona (Rossmassler, 1835)
- Cattania sztolcmani (A. J. Wagner, 1927)
- Caucasotachea vindobonensis (Ferussac, 1821)
- Cornu aspersum (O. F. Müller, 1774)
- Eobania vermiculata (O. F. Müller, 1774)
- Helix albescens Rossmässler, 1839
- Helix figulina Rossmässler, 1839
- Helix lucorum Linnaeus, 1757
- Helix philibinensis Rossmässler, 1839
- Helix pomacella Mousson, 1854
- Helix pomatia Linnaeus, 1758
- Helix thessalica Boettger, 1886

Hygromiidae

- Euomphalia strigella (Draparnaud, 1801)
- Hygromia cinctella (Draparnaud, 1801)
- Monacha claustralis (Menke, 1828)
- Monacha carascaloides (Bourguignat, 1855)
- Monacha cartusiana (Müller, 1774)
- Monacha frequens (Mousson, 1859
- Monacha ocellata (L. Pintér, 1968)
- Monacha oshanovae I. Pintér & L. Pintér, 1970
- Monacha ovularis (Bourguignat, 1855)
- Monacha solidior (Mousson, 1873)
- Monacha venusta (L. Pintér, 1968)
- Monachoides incarnatus (O. F. Müller, 1774)
- Pseudotrichia rubiginosa (Schmidt, 1853)
- Xerocampylaea erjaveci (Brusina, 1870)

== Freshwater bivalves ==
Cyrenidae

- Corbicula fluminea (O. F. Müller, 1774)

Dreissenidae

- Dreissena polymorpha (Pallas, 1771)

Sphaeriidae

- Pisidium amnicum (O. F. Müller, 1774)
- Pisidium globulare Clessin, 1873
- Pisidium milium Held, 1836
- Pisidium obtusale (Lamarck, 1818)
- Pisidium personatum Malm, 1855
- Pisidium pseudosphaerium Schlesch, 1947
- Euglesa casertana (Poli, 1791)
- Euglesa henslowana (Sheppard, 1823)
- Euglesa nitida Jenyns, 1832
- Euglesa subtruncata Malm, 1855
- Euglesa supina A. Schmidt, 1851
- Odhneripisidium moitessierianum (Paladilhe, 1866)
- Odhneripisidium tenuilineatum Stelfox, 1918
- Sphaerium corneum (Linnaeus, 1758)
- Sphaerium lacustre (O. F. Müller, 1774)
- Sphaerium nucleus (Studer, 1820)
- Sphaerium rivicola (Lamarck, 1818)

Unionidae

- Sinanodonta woodiana (Lea, 1834)

== See also ==
- Fauna of Bulgaria

Lists of molluscs of surrounding countries:

- List of non-marine molluscs of Romania
- List of non-marine molluscs of Serbia
- List of non-marine molluscs of the Republic of Macedonia
- List of non-marine molluscs of Greece
- List of non-marine molluscs of Turkey
