= List of non-marine molluscs of Ukraine =

Location of Ukraine

There are at least 287 species of non-marine molluscs present in Ukraine: 207 species of terrestrial molluscs, more than 50 freshwater species of gastropods and 30 species of freshwater bivalves

== Terrestrial molluscs ==
The list is given on the basis of "An annotated checklist of the terrestrial molluscs of Ukraine" published in Journal of Conchology in 2012. In this article 203 species are listed as registered in Ukraine.

Species that listed by the other sources are given with individual references.

=== List of the terrestrial molluscs registered in Ukraine ===
Aciculidae

- Acicula parcelineata (Clessin, 1911)
- Platyla polita (Hartmann, 1840) – incl. Platyla oedogyra (Paladilhe, 1868)
- Platyla perpusilla (Reinhardt, 1880)
- Platyla jankowskiana (Jackiewicz, 1979)

Pomatiidae

- Pomatias rivularis (Eichwald, 1829)

Ellobiidae

- Ovatella myosotis (Draparnaud, 1801) – amphibiotic species, lives in supralittoral zone, sometimes listed among the terrestrial molluscs, sometimes among the marine molluscs.

Carychiidae

- Carychium minimum O. F. Müller, 1774
- Carychium tridentatum (Risso, 1826)

Orculidae

- Sphyradium doliolum (Bruguière, 1792)
- Lauria cylindracea (Da Costa, 1778)
- Argna bielzi (Rossmässler, 1859)

Valloniidae

- Spermodea lamellata Jeffreys, 1830
- Acanthinula aculeata (O. F. Müller, 1774)
- Vallonia costata (O. F. Müller, 1774)
- Vallonia pulchella (O. F. Müller, 1774)
- Vallonia excentrica Sterki, 1893
- Vallonia enniensis (Gredler, 1856)

Cochlicopidae

- Cochlicopa lubrica (O. F. Müller, 1774) – incl. Cochlicopa repentina Hudec, 1960
- Cochlicopa lubricella (Rossmässler, 1835)
- Cochlicopa nitens (Gallenstein, 1848)

Pupillidae

- Gibbulinopsis interrupta (Reinhardt, 1876)
- Pupilla muscorum (Linnaeus, 1758)
- Pupilla triplicata (Studer, 1820)
- Pupilla bigranata (Rossmässler, 1839)
- Pupilla sterrii (Voith, 1840)

Pyramidulidae

- Pyramidula pusilla (Vallot, 1801)

Chondrinidae

- Granaria frumentum (Draparnaud, 1801)
- Chondrina arcadica (Westerlund, 1883)
- Rupestrella rhodia (Roth, 1839)

Vertiginidae

- Vertigo pusilla O. F. Müller, 1774
- Vertigo antivertigo (Draparnaud, 1801)
- Vertigo substriata (Jeffreys, 1833)
- Vertigo pygmaea (Draparnaud, 1801)
- Vertigo moulinsiana (Dupuy, 1849)
- Vertigo geyeri Lindholm, 1925
- Vertigo alpestris Alder, 1837
- Vertigo angustior Jeffreys, 1830
- Columella edentula (Draparnaud, 1805)
- Columella cf. columella (Martens, 1830)
- Truncatellina costulata (Nilsson, 1822)
- Truncatellina claustralis (Gredler, 1856)
- Truncatellina cylindrica (Férussac, 1807)

Enidae

- Merdigera obscura (O. F. Müller, 1774)
- Peristoma merduenianum Krynicki, 1833
- Peristoma rupestre (Krynicki, 1833)
- Ena montana (Draparnaud, 1801)
- Brephulopsis cylindrica (Menke, 1828)
- Brephulopsis bidens (Krynicki, 1833)
- Brephulopsis konovalovae Gural-Sverlova & Gural, 2010
- Thoanteus gibber (Krynicki, 1833)
- Thoanteus ferrarii Hausdorf, 1994
- Ramusculus subulatus (Rossmässler, 1837)
- Chondrula tridens (O. F. Müller, 1774)
- Chondrula microtragus (Rossmässler, 1839)
- Mastus bielzi (Kimakowicz, 1890)

Clausiliidae

- Serrulina serrulata (L. Pfeiffer 1847)
- Cochlodina laminata (Montagu, 1803)
- Cochlodina orthostoma (Menke, 1828)
- Cochlodina cerata (Rossmässler 1836)
- Elia novorossica (Retowski, 1888)
- Ruthenica filograna (Rossmässler, 1836)
- Macrogastra ventricosa (Draparnaud, 1801)
- Macrogastra tumida (Rossmässler, 1836)
- Macrogastra borealis (O. Boettger, 1878)
- Macrogastra plicatula (Draparnaud, 1801)
- Clausilia cruciata (Studer, 1820)
- Clausilia pumila C. Pfeiffer, 1828
- Clausilia dubia Draparnaud, 1805
- Mentissa canalifera (Rossmässler, 1836)
- Mentissa gracilicosta (Rossmässler, 1836)
- Mentissa velutina Baidashnikov, 1990
- Vestia elata (Rossmässler, 1836)
- Vestia gulo (Bielz, 1859)
- Vestia turgida (Rossmässler, 1836)
- Bulgarica cana (Held, 1836)
- Laciniaria plicata (Draparnaud, 1801)
- Alinda biplicata (Montagu, 1803)
- Alinda fallax (Rossmässler, 1836)
- Alinda stabilis (L. Pfeiffer, 1847)
- Balea perversa (Linnaeus, 1758)

Ferussaciidae

- Cecilioides acicula (O. F. Müller, 1774)
- Cecilioides raddei (O. Boettger, 1879)

Helicodiscidae

- Lucilla singleyana (Pilsbry, 1889)

Punctidae

- Punctum pygmaeum (Draparnaud, 1801)

Discidae

- Discus ruderatus (W. Hartmann, 1821)
- Discus rotundatus (O. F. Müller, 1774)
- Discus perspectivus (Megerle von Mühlfeld, 1816)

Milacidae

- Tandonia cristata (Kaleniczenko, 1851)
- Tandonia retowskii (O. Boettger, 1882)
- Tandonia kusceri (H. Wagner, 1931)

Euconulidae

- Euconulus fulvus (O. F. Müller, 1774) – incl. Euconulus alderi (Gray, 1840)

Gastrodontidae

- Zonitoides nitidus (O. F. Müller, 1774)

Zonitidae sensu Riedel, 2000 and Schileyko, 2003 non Hausdorf, 1998

- Vitrea diaphana (Studer, 1820)
- Vitrea transsylvanica (Clessin, 1877)
- Vitrea subrimata (Reinhardt, 1871)
- Vitrea crystallina (O. F. Müller, 1774)
- Vitrea contracta (Westerlund, 1871)
- Vitrea pygmaea (O. Boettger, 1880)
- Vitrea nadejdae Lindholm, 1926
- Taurinellushka babugana Balashov, 2014
- Aegopinella pura (Alder, 1830)
- Aegopinella minor (Stabile, 1864)
- Aegopinella nitens (Michaud, 1831)
- Aegopinella nitidula (Draparnaud, 1805)
- Aegopinella epipedostoma (Fagot 1879)
- Perpolita hammonis (Strøm, 1765)
- Perpolita petronella (L. Pfeiffer, 1853)
- Cellariopsis deubeli (A. Wagner, 1914)
- Riedeliconcha depressa (Sterki, 1880)
- Morlina glabra (Westerlund, 1881)
- Oxychilus draparnaudi (Beck, 1837)
- Oxychilus diaphanellus (Krynicki, 1836)
- Oxychilus translucidus (Mortillet, 1853)
- Oxychilus deilus (Bourguignat, 1857)
- Oxychilus koutaisanus (Mousson, 1863) – was revealed in 2012 from materials collected in 1995 on the urban area of Svitlodarsk city.
- Oxychilus kobelti (Lindholm, 1910)
- Oxychilus hydatinus (Rossmässler, 1838)
- Oxychilus inopinatus (Uličný, 1887)
- Oxychilus iphigenia (Lindholm, 1926)

Daudebardiidae

- Daudebardia rufa (Draparnaud, 1805)
- Daudebardia brevipes (Draparnaud, 1805)
- Bilania boettgeri (Clessin, 1883)
- Carpathica calophana (Westerlund, 1881)

Trigonochlamydidae

- Selenochlamys cf. ysbryda Rowson & Symondson, 2008 – in 2012 was rediscovered in the Crimean Mountains. Probably a native species.

Parmacellidae

- Parmacella ibera (Eichwald, 1841)

Vitrinidae

- Phenacolimax annularis (Studer, 1820)
- Semilimax semilimax (Férussac, 1802)
- Semilimax kotulae (Westerlund, 1883)
- Eucobresia nivalis (Dumont & Mortillet, 1854)
- Vitrina pellucida (O. F. Müller, 1774)

Limacidae

- Malacolimax tenellus (O. F. Müller, 1774)
- Lehmannia marginata (O. F. Müller, 1774)
- Lehmannia macroflagellata Grossu & Lupu, 1962
- Limax maximus Linnaeus, 1758
- Limax cinereoniger Wolf, 1803
- Limax bielzii Seibert, 1874
- Limacus flavus (Linnaeus, 1758)
- Limacus maculatus (Kaleniczenko, 1851)
- Bielzia coerulans (Bielz, 1851)

Agriolimacidae

- Deroceras laeve (O. F. Müller, 1774)
- Deroceras sturanyi (Simroth, 1894)
- Deroceras agreste (Linnaeus, 1758)
- Deroceras reticulatum (O. F. Müller, 1774)
- Deroceras turcicum (Simroth, 1894)
- Deroceras tauricum (Simroth, 1901) incl. Deroceras crimense (Simroth, 1901)
- Deroceras rodnae Grossu & Lupu, 1965
- Deroceras subagreste (Simroth, 1892)
- Deroceras bakurianum (Simroth, 1912)
- Deroceras caucasicum (Simroth, 1901)
- Deroceras moldavicum (Grossu & Lupu, 1961)
- Deroceras occidentale (Grossu & Lupu, 1966)
- Krynickillus melanocephalus Kaleniczenko, 1851

Boettgerillidae

- Boettgerilla pallens Simroth, 1912

Bradybaenidae

- Fruticicola fruticum (O. F. Müller, 1774)

Helicidae

- Drobacia banatica (Rossmässler, 1838)
- Isognomostoma isognomostomos (Schröter, 1784)
- Arianta arbustorum (Linnaeus, 1758)
- Arianta petrii (Kimakowicz, 1890)
- Campylaea faustina (Rossmässler, 1835)
- Eobania vermiculata (O.F. Müller, 1774)
- Helix pomatia Linnaeus, 1758
- Helix lutescens (Rossmässler, 1837)
- Helix albescens (Rossmässler, 1839)
- Helix lucorum Linnaeus, 1758
- Cepaea hortensis (O. F. Müller, 1774)
- Cepaea nemoralis (Linnaeus, 1758)
- Cepaea vindobonensis (C. Pfeiffer, 1828)

Hygromiidae

- Plicuteria lubomirskii (Ślósarskii, 1881)
- Trochulus hispidus (Linnaeus, 1758) incl. Trochulus concinnus (Jeffreys 1830)
- Trochulus villosulus (Rossmässler, 1838)
- Trochulus bielzi (Bielz, 1859)
- Edentiella bakowskii (Polinski, 1924)
- Helicopsis striata (O. F. Müller, 1774)
- Helicopsis retowskii (Clessin, 1883)
- Helicopsis dejecta (Cristofori & Jan, 1832)
- Helicopsis gasprensis (Hesse, 1934)
- Helicopsis instabilis (Rossmässler, 1838)
- Helicopsis filimargo (Krynicki, 1833)
- Helicopsis subfilimargo Gural-Sverlova, 2010
- Helicopsis martynovi Gural-Sverlova, 2010
- Helicopsis luganica Gural-Sverlova, 2010
- Xeropicta krynickii (Krynicki, 1833)
- Xeropicta derbentina (Krynicki, 1836)
- Xerolenta obvia (Menke, 1828)
- Pseudotrichia rubiginosa (Rossmässler, 1838) incl. Trochulus czarnohoricus (Poliński, 1924)
- Monachoides vicinus (Rossmässler, 1842)
- Monachoides incarnatus (O. F. Müller, 1774)
- Perforatella bidentata (Gmelin, 1791)
- Perforatella dibothrion (Kimakowicz, 1884)
- Prostenomphalia carpathica (Baidashnikov, 1985)
- Urticicola umbrosus (C. Pfeiffer, 1828)
- Cernuella virgata (Da Costa, 1778)
- Harmozica ravergiensis (Férussac, 1835)
- Euomphalia strigella (Draparnaud, 1801)
- Monacha cartusiana (O. F. Müller, 1774)
- Monacha claustralis (Menke, 1828)
- Monacha fruticola (Krynicki, 1833)

Arionidae

- Arion circumscriptus Johnston, 1828
- Arion fasciatus (Nilsson, 1823)
- Arion silvaticus Lohmander, 1937
- Arion subfuscus sensu lato – Arion fuscus (O. F. Müller, 1774) and Arion transsylvanus Simroth 1885 are expected
- Arion distinctus Mabille, 1868
- Arion lusitanicus sensu lato

Succineidae

- Succinea putris (Linnaeus, 1758)
- Succinella oblonga (Draparnaud, 1801)
- Oxyloma elegans (Risso, 1826)
- Oxyloma sarsii (Esmark, 1886)

=== Terrestrial molluscs whose presence in Ukraine is doubtful ===
Moreover in "An annotated checklist of the terrestrial molluscs of Ukraine" list of species which were reported for Ukraine erroneously or doubtfully is given. It includes: Pilorcula trifilaris (Mousson, 1856), Chondrina avenacea (Bruguière, 1792), Abida secale (Draparnaud, 1801), Zebrina detrita (O.F. Müller, 1774), Zebrina dardana (Philippi, 1844), Chondrus zebrula (Férussac, 1821), Chondrus tournefortianus (Férussac, 1821), Mastus pupa (Linnaeus, 1758), Mastus caucasicus (L. Pfeiffer, 1852), Cochlodina costata (C. Pfeiffer 1828), Scrobifera taurica (L. Pfeiffer 1848), Poiretia sp., Oxychilus subeffusus (O. Boettger 1879), Oxychilus cellarius (O. F. Müller, 1774), Oxychilus alliarius (Miller, 1822), Aegopis verticillus (Lamarck, 1822), Helicigona cingulata (Studer, 1820), Causa holosericea (S. Studer, 1820), Cornu aspersum (O. F. Müller, 1774), Arion hortensis Férussac, 1819, Arion ater sensu lato, Oxyloma dunkeri (L. Pfeiffer, 1865), Orcula dolium (Draparnaud, 1801), Pagodulina pagodula (Des Moulins, 1830), Bulgarica vetusta (Rossmässler, 1836), Alopia glauca (Bielz, 1853) and Deroceras praecox Wiktor, 1966.

== Freshwater molluscs ==
=== List of freshwater Gastropoda ===
(incomplete list based on individual publications focused on specific taxa and/or regions)

Lymnaeidae

- Lymnaea stagnalis (Linnaeus, 1758)
- Lymnaea fragilis (Linnaeus, 1758)
- Stagnicola (Corvusiana) corvus (Gmelin in Linnaeus, 1791)
- Galba truncatula (O.F. Müller, 1774)
- Galba subangulata (Roffiaen, 1868)
- Galba oblonga (Puton, 1847)
- Ladislavella terebra (Westerlund, 1885)
- Radix (Radix) auricularia (Linnaeus, 1758)
- Radix (Radix) cf. parapsilia Vinarski et Glöer, 2009
- Radix (Radix) ampla (Hartmann, 1821)
- Radix (Peregriana) tumida (Held, 1836)
- Radix (Peregriana) ampullаcea (Rossmässler, 1835)
- Radix (Peregriana) balthica (Linnaeus, 1758)
- Radix (Peregriana) intermedia (Lamarck, 1822)

Melanopsidae

- Fagotia acicularis (Férussac, 1823)
- Fagotia esperi (Férussac, 1823)

Neritidae

- Theodoxus danubialis (Pfeiffer, 1828)
- Theodoxus fluviatilis (Linnaeus, 1758)
- Theodoxus danasteri (Lindholm, 1908)
- Theodoxus sarmaticus (Lindholm, 1908)
- Theodoxus euxinus (Clessin, 1885)
- Theodoxus velox (Anistratenko, 2001)

Viviparidae

- Viviparus viviparus (Linnaeus, 1758)
- Viviparus contectus (Millet, 1813)

=== List of freshwater Bivalvia ===
List is given on the basis of 2002 annotated checklist.

Unionidae

- Unio tumidus tumidus Philipsson, 1788
- Unio pictorum (Linnaeus, 1758)
- Unio crassus (Philipsson, 1788)
- Anodonta cygnea (Linnaeus, 1758)
- Anodonta anatina (Linnaeus, 1758)
- Sinanodonta woodiana (Lea, 1834) – invasive species
- Pseudanodonta complanata (Rossmässler, 1835)

Sphaeriidae

- Sphaerium rivicola (Lamarck, 1818)
- Sphaerium solidum (Normand, 1844)
- Sphaerium corneum (Linnaeus, 1758)
- Sphaerium nucleus (Studer, 1820)
- Sphaerium ovale (A. Férussac, 1807)
- Musculium lacustre (O. F. Müller, 1774)
- Pisidium amnicum (O. F. Müller, 1774)
- Pisidium moitessierianum Paladilhe, 1866
- Pisidium personatum Malm, 1855
- Pisidium casertanum (Poli, 1791)
- Pisidium globulare Westerlund & Clessin, 1873
- Pisidium obtusale (Lamarck, 1818)
- Pisidium henslowanum (Sheppard, 1823)
- Pisidium supinum A. Schmidt, 1851
- Pisidium lilljeborgii Clessin, 1886
- Pisidium nitidum Jenyns, 1832
- Pisidium pseudosphaerium J. Favre, 1927
- Pisidium hibernicum Westerlund, 1894
- Pisidium subtruncatum Malm, 1855
- Pisidium pulchellum Jenyns, 1832
- Pisidium milium Held, 1836

Dreissenidae

- Dreissena polymorpha (Pallas, 1771)
- Dreissena bugensis Andrusov, 1897

== See also ==
Lists of molluscs of surrounding countries:

- List of non-marine molluscs of Poland
- List of non-marine molluscs of Slovakia
- List of non-marine molluscs of the Czech Republic
