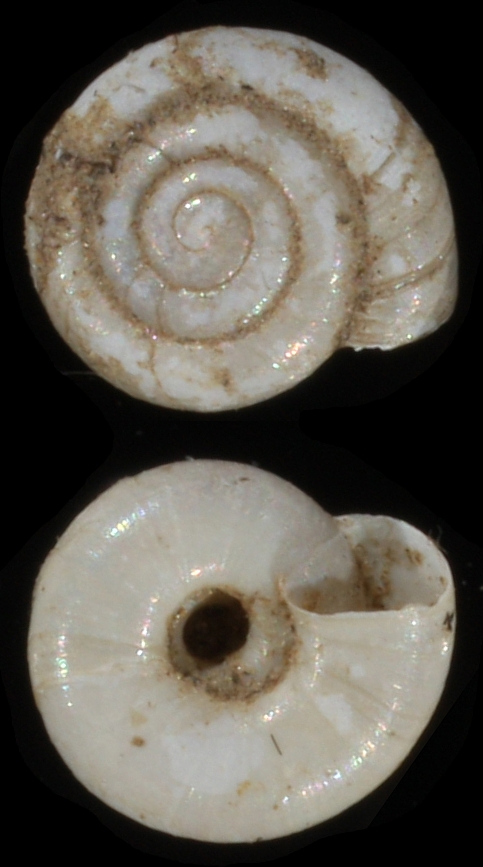
- Apical and umbilical view of the shell of Vitrea vereae

Scientific classification
- Domain: Eukaryota
- Kingdom: Animalia
- Phylum: Mollusca
- Class: Gastropoda
- Order: Stylommatophora
- Superfamily: Gastrodontoidea
- Family: Pristilomatidae
- Genus: Vitrea
- Species: V. vereae

Binomial name
- Vitrea vereae Irikov, Georgiev & Riedel, 2004

= Vitrea vereae =

Species of gastropod

Vitrea vereae is a species of small, air-breathing land snail, a terrestrial pulmonate gastropod mollusk in the family Pristilomatidae.

== Description ==
The shell is small: Up to 1.15 mm x 2.8 mm. Diameter (seen from above) 1.3-1.4 mm at 2 whorls, 2.0-2.2 mm (3 whorls), 2.6-2.7 mm (3.5 whorls)

The umbilicus is extremely wide, wider than in the other Vitrea species.

== Distribution ==
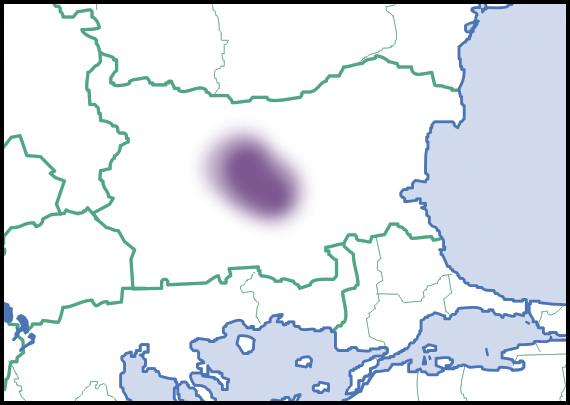
Distribution in Europe of Vitrea vereae

This species occurs in:

- Bulgaria
