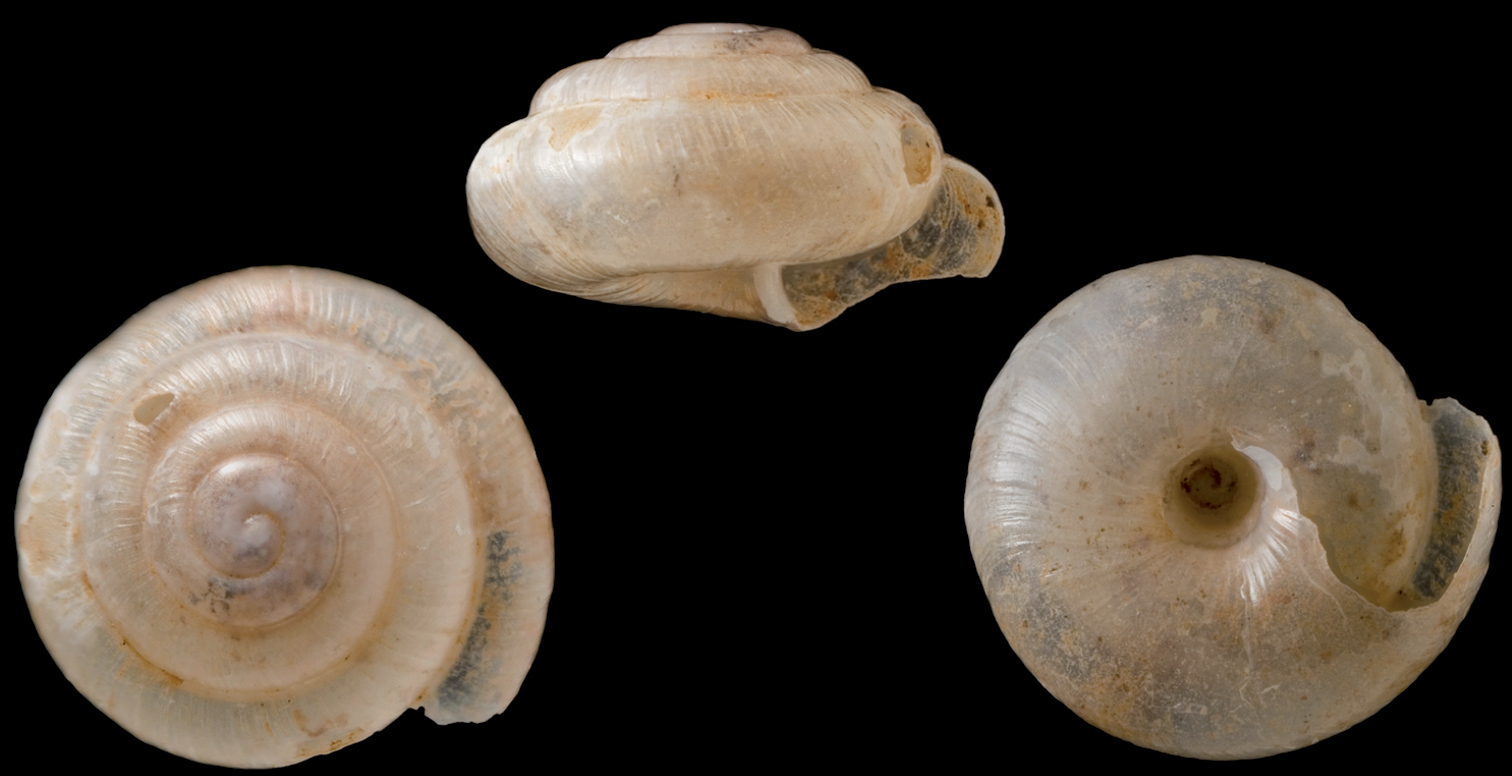
- Vitrea gostelii shell

Scientific classification
- Kingdom: Animalia
- Phylum: Mollusca
- Class: Gastropoda
- Order: Stylommatophora
- Family: Pristilomatidae
- Genus: Vitrea
- Species: V. gostelii

Binomial name
- Vitrea gostelii Gümüs & Neubert, 2012

= Vitrea gosteliae =

Species of gastropod

Vitrea gosteliae is a species of small, air-breathing land snail, a terrestrial pulmonate gastropod mollusc in the family Pristilomatidae.

== Description ==
The height of the holotype attains 1.29 mm, its diameter 2.25 mm.

(Original description) The shell is pale whitish in colour, with a broadly depressed spire. The protoconch is broadly expanded and sculptured with fine spiral threads. The teleoconch whorls are narrow and increase regularly, with a suture of moderate depth. The body whorl is broadened, non-descending, and well rounded.

The surface of the teleoconch is sculptured with fine, widely spaced riblets. The spiral sculpture originating on the protoconch continues onto the teleoconch whorls and becomes more pronounced, intersecting the riblets and imparting a finely granulated appearance. On the base, the riblets become weaker, while the spiral sculpture increases in strength.

The umbilicus is of medium width, funnel-shaped to cylindriform.

== Distribution ==
This species is endemic to Turkey.
