= Lindbergia =

Lindbergia may refer to:

- Lindbergia (gastropod), a genus of gastropods in the family Pristilomatidae
- Lindbergia (plant), a genus of mosses in the family Leskeaceae
- Lindbergia, a genus of plants in the family Poaceae, synonym of Poa
- Lindbergia, a genus of fishes in the family Nototheniidae, synonym of Lepidonotothen
