= Vitrea inae =

Conservation status
- Data Deficient (IUCN 3.1)

Scientific classification
- Kingdom: Animalia
- Phylum: Mollusca
- Class: Gastropoda
- Order: Stylommatophora
- Family: Pristilomatidae
- Genus: Vitrea
- Species: V. inae

Binomial name
- Vitrea inae Winter & Ripken, 1991

Species of gastropod

Vitrea inae is a species of small, air-breathing land snail, a terrestrial pulmonate gastropod mollusc in the family Pristilomatidae.

== Distribution ==
This species is endemic to Spain.
