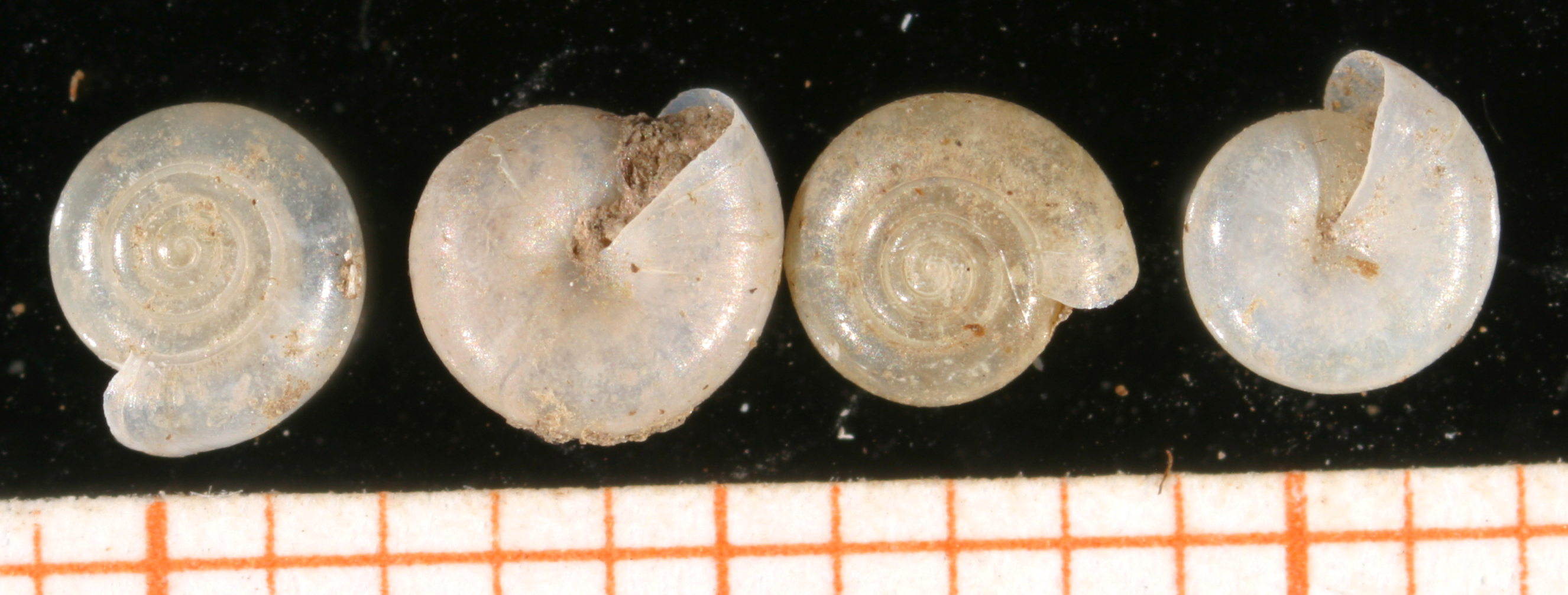
- Shell of Vitrea transsylvanica

Scientific classification
- Kingdom: Animalia
- Phylum: Mollusca
- Class: Gastropoda
- Order: Stylommatophora
- Superfamily: Gastrodontoidea
- Family: Pristilomatidae
- Genus: Vitrea
- Species: V. transsylvanica

Binomial name
- Vitrea transsylvanica (Clessin, 1877)

Synonyms
- Hyalina transsylvanica Clessin, 1877 (original combination); Vitrea (Vitrea) transsylvanica (Clessin, 1877) · alternate representation

= Vitrea transsylvanica =

Species of gastropod

Vitrea transsylvanica is a species of small, air-breathing land snail, a terrestrial pulmonate gastropod mollusk in the family Pristilomatidae.

== Description ==
The shell is small: 1.3-2.2 mm x 3.0-4.5 mm.

The body whorl is more inflated than in Vitrea subrimata and Vitrea subcarinata. The width, as seen from above, is around 2.3-2.6 times that of the penultimate whorl. The first whorls are denser arranged than in Vitrea subrimata. The aperture, as seen from above, is weakly curved (Nautilus-like protruded). There is no umbilicus

This species differs from Vitrea diaphana in its wider body whorl and its Nautilus-like protruded aperture (in Vitrea diaphana straight).

== Distribution ==
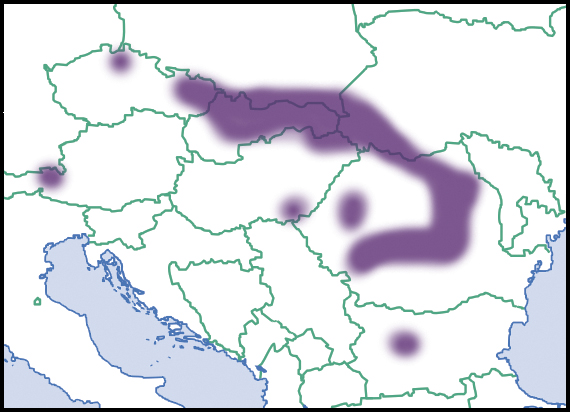
Distribution in Europe of Vitrea transsylvanica

This species occurs in:

- Czech Republic
- Ukraine

The species occurs in closed forests, mainly in beech forests.
