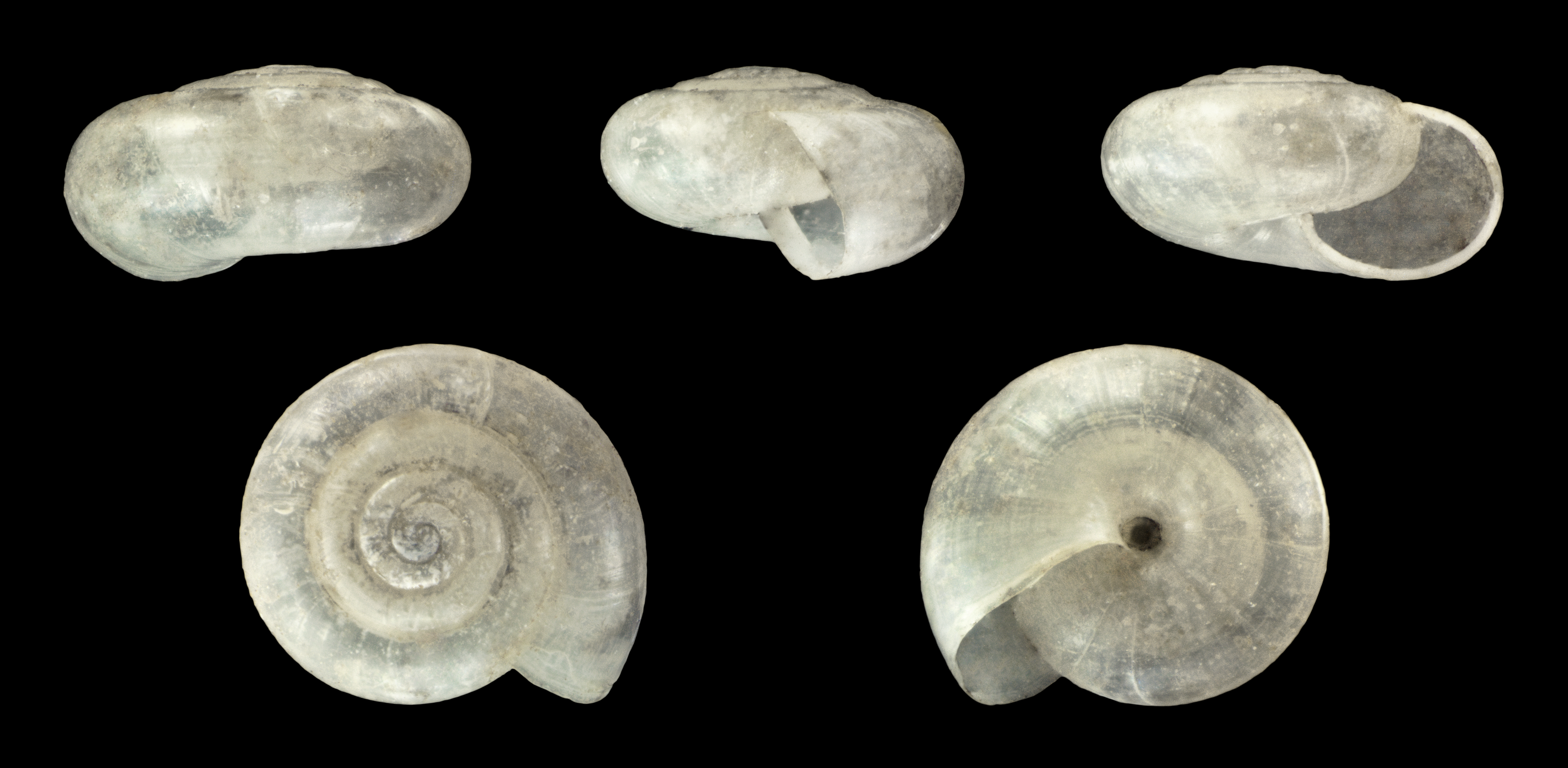
- Shell of Vitrea crystallina

Scientific classification
- Domain: Eukaryota
- Kingdom: Animalia
- Phylum: Mollusca
- Class: Gastropoda
- Order: Stylommatophora
- Superfamily: Gastrodontoidea
- Family: Pristilomatidae
- Genus: Vitrea
- Species: V. crystallina

Binomial name
- Vitrea crystallina (O. F. Müller, 1774)

Synonyms
- Helix crystallina O. F. Müller, 1774 ·; Hyalina (Vitrea) crystallina (O. F. Müller, 1774) superseded combination; Hyalina (Vitrea) crystallina var. orientalis M. Kimakowicz, 1883 junior subjective synonym; Hyalina crystallina (O. F. Müller, 1774) ·; Hyalina crystallina var. fuerteventurae Wollaston, 1878 ·; Hyalina podolica Clessin, 1880 (junior synonym); Hyalinia andreaei O. Boettger, 1880 ·; Vitrea (Crystallus) crystallina (O. F. Müller, 1774) ·; Vitrea podolica Clessin, 1880 (junior synonym); Zonites humicola Mabille, 1870 ·; Zonites secretus Bourguignat, 1881 ·; Zonites subterraneus Bourguignat, 1856 ·

= Vitrea crystallina =

Species of gastropod

Vitrea crystallina is a species of small, air-breathing land snail, a terrestrial pulmonate gastropod mollusk in the family Pristilomatidae.

== Description ==
For terms see gastropod shell.

The 1.4-2.1 x 3-4 mm. shell is variable. It has 4-5 whorls and the last whorl width seen from above 1.5-2 x of penultimate whorl. The umbilicus is narrow, much narrower than in Vitrea botterii, but clearly open, showing penultimate whorl, initially narrower, widened only at last whorl. Usually smaller than V. diaphana, and larger than V. contracta which has more densely coiled whorls.

== Distribution ==
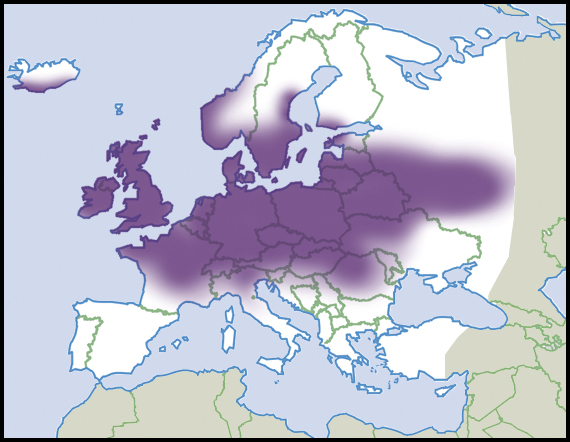
Distribution of Vitrea crystallina in Europe

This species occurs in countries and islands including:

- Czech Republic
- Ukraine
- Great Britain
- Ireland
- and other areas

These snails live under leaf litter and humus layer, under stones in moist forests, between moss and in floodplains and swamp forests. They are also found in wet meadows, spring areas and swamps.
