= Vitrea nadejdae =

Scientific classification
- Kingdom: Animalia
- Phylum: Mollusca
- Class: Gastropoda
- Order: Stylommatophora
- Family: Pristilomatidae
- Genus: Vitrea
- Species: V. nadejdae

Binomial name
- Vitrea nadejdae (Lindholm, 1926)

Species of gastropod

Vitrea nadejdae is a species of small, air-breathing land snail, a terrestrial pulmonate gastropod mollusc in the family Pristilomatidae.

== Distribution ==
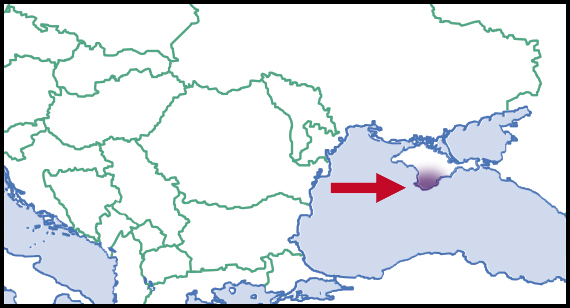
Distribution of Vitrea nadejdae

This species is endemic to the Crimea (Ukraine).

== Sources ==
- Bank, R. A.; Neubert, E. (2017). Checklist of the land and freshwater Gastropoda of Europe. Last update: July 16, 2017
- Sysoev, A. V. & Schileyko, A. A. (2009). Land snails and slugs of Russia and adjacent countries. Sofia/Moskva (Pensoft). 312 pp., 142 plates
