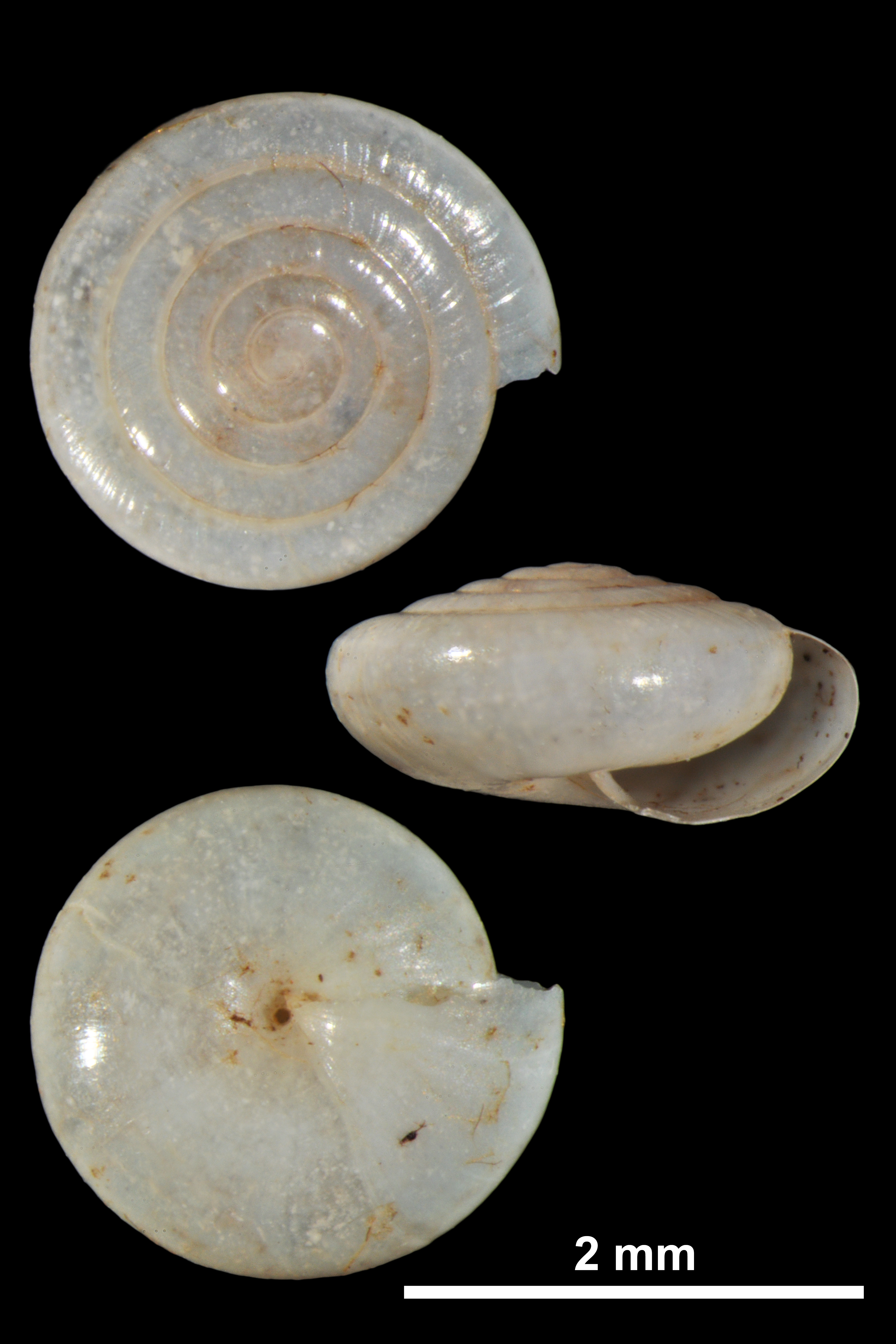
- Shell of Vitrea pseudotrolli (specimen at MNHN, Paris)

Conservation status
- Near Threatened (IUCN 3.1)

Scientific classification
- Kingdom: Animalia
- Phylum: Mollusca
- Class: Gastropoda
- Order: Stylommatophora
- Superfamily: Gastrodontoidea
- Family: Pristilomatidae
- Genus: Vitrea
- Species: V. pseudotrolli

Binomial name
- Vitrea pseudotrolli (Pinter, 1983)

= Vitrea pseudotrolli =

Species of gastropod

Vitrea pseudotrolli is a species of small, air-breathing land snail, a terrestrial pulmonate gastropod mollusk in the family Pristilomatidae.

== Distribution ==
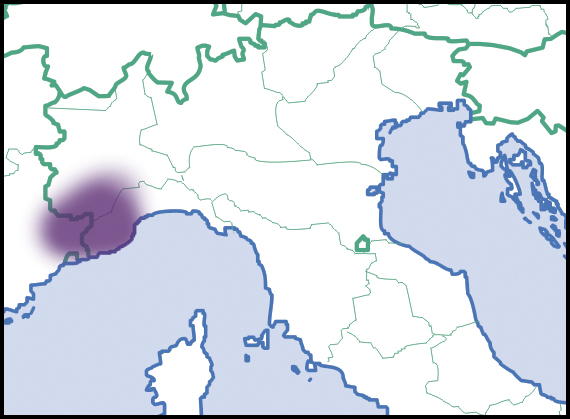
Distribution of Vitrea pseudotrolli

This species is found in France and Italy.
