= Vitrea striata =

Conservation status
- Critically Endangered (IUCN 3.1)

Scientific classification
- Kingdom: Animalia
- Phylum: Mollusca
- Class: Gastropoda
- Order: Stylommatophora
- Superfamily: Gastrodontoidea
- Family: Pristilomatidae
- Genus: Vitrea
- Species: V. striata

Binomial name
- Vitrea striata Norris, Paul & Riedel, 1988

Species of gastropod

Vitrea striata is a species of small, air-breathing land snail, a terrestrial pulmonate gastropod mollusk in the family Pristilomatidae.

== Description ==
The shell is very small: 1.3-1.5 mm x 3.2-3.7 mm.

The shell is glassy. The first whorls are smooth any shiny. The last whorls are prominently and irregularly striated. The shell contains 5-5.5 slowly increasing step-like whorls with a moderately impressed suture. The upper side is nearly flat, the lower side rounded or with a rather triangular outline. The periphery has a blunt edge in the upper section. The body whorl width is 1.5times that of the penultimate whorl. The umbilicus is very narrow, 1/20 of diameter.

== Distribution ==
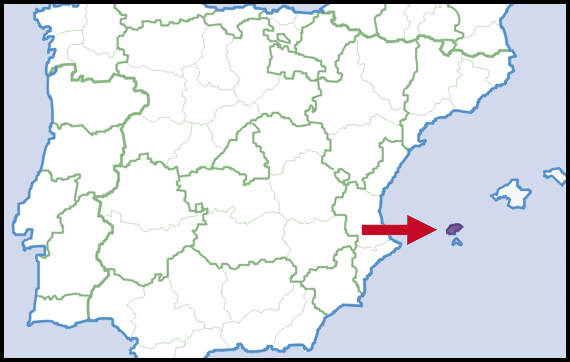
Distribution of Vitrea striata

This species is endemic to Ibiza, Spain. It was found at the foot of cliffs.
