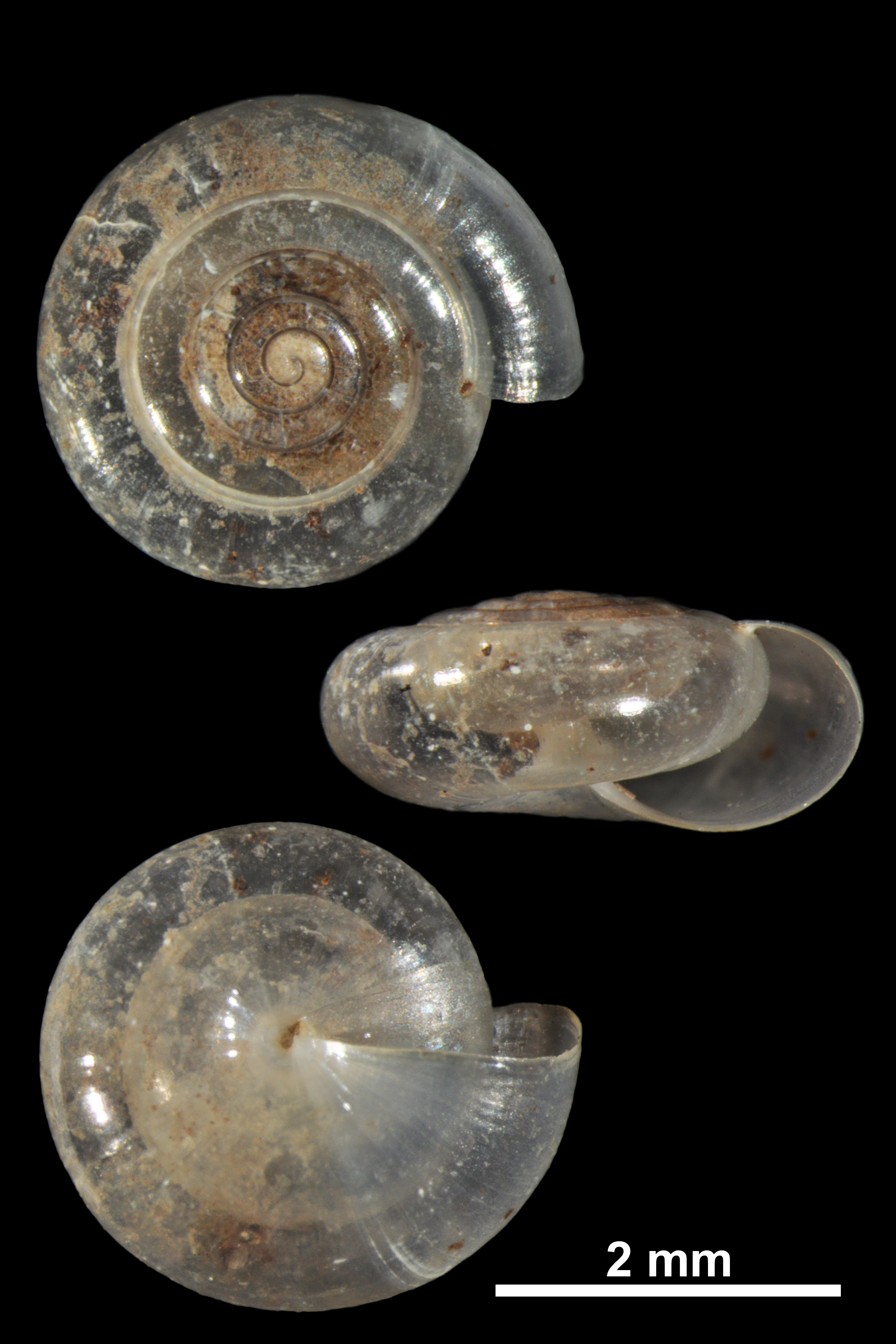
- Shell of Vitrea diaphana (specimen at MNHN, Paris)

Scientific classification
- Kingdom: Animalia
- Phylum: Mollusca
- Class: Gastropoda
- Order: Stylommatophora
- Superfamily: Gastrodontoidea
- Family: Pristilomatidae
- Genus: Vitrea
- Species: V. diaphana

Binomial name
- Vitrea diaphana (Studer, 1820)

Synonyms
- Glischrus (Helix) diaphana S. Studer, 1820 (original name); Helix contorta Held, 1837 junior subjective synonym; Vitrea (Vitrea) diaphana (S. Studer, 1820) ·

= Vitrea diaphana =

Species of gastropod

Vitrea diaphana is a species of small, air-breathing land snail, a terrestrial pulmonate gastropod mollusk in the family Pristilomatidae.

This is the type species of the genus Vitrea.

== Description ==
The coiled, rather small, dextral shell is very flattened and conical, the seam hardly rises when viewed from the side. It has a width of 3.1 to 4.2 mm and a height of 1.8 to 2.1 mm. It contains 5½ to 6 tightly wound, regular, only slowly increasing whorls. The body whorl is 1.7 to 2.3 times as wide at the aperture as the penultimate. The aperture is almost half cut off from the penultimate. It is transversely elliptic or transversely ovate when viewed directly from above, and has an obliquely crescent shape, due to the strong incision made by the previous whorl. The aperture is almost perpendicular to the shell axis. The edge of the aperture is usually straight and tapers into a point. However, it can be slightly amplified every now and then. The columella is folded and callused. The umbilicus is closed and often covered by the folded edge of the columella.

The thin shell is colorless and glassy translucent. The surface is almost smooth and has a high gloss. The growth lines are only clearly visible near the seam and are slightly more striped.

== Distribution ==
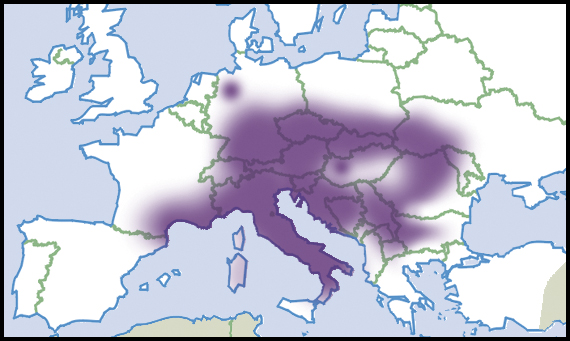
Distribution in Europe

The distribution of this species is alpine and southern-European.

- Czech Republic
- Ukraine

Vitrea diaphana lives in moderately moist locations, under leaf litter and dead wood, among rocks and debris of mountain forests.
