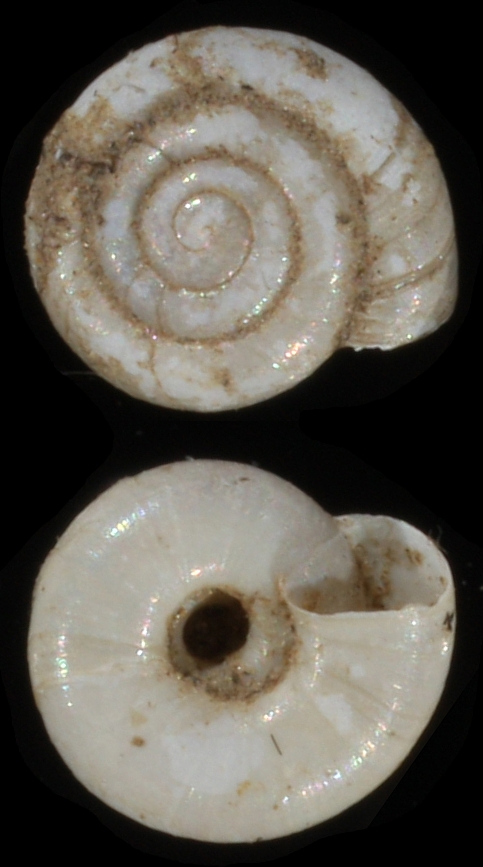
- Apical and umbilical view of an oxidized shell of Vitrea vereae. The shell when fresh is glassy and transparent.

Scientific classification
- Domain: Eukaryota
- Kingdom: Animalia
- Phylum: Mollusca
- Class: Gastropoda
- Order: Stylommatophora
- Infraorder: Limacoidei
- Superfamily: Gastrodontoidea
- Family: Pristilomatidae
- Genus: Vitrea; Fitzinger, 1833

Type species
- Glischrus (Helix) diaphana S. Studer, 1820

Synonyms
- Anomphala Westerlund, 1886; Anomphalus [sic] (incorrect subsequent spelling); Crystallinus A.J. Wagner, 1907; Crystallus R. T. Lowe, 1855; Diaphanella Clessin, 1880; Helix (Crystallus) R. T. Lowe, 1855; Hyalina (Crystallus) R. T. Lowe, 1855; Hyalina (Vitrea) Fitzinger, 1833; † Hyalinia (Vitrea) Fitzinger, 1833 (considered as a separate genus); Pinterella A. Riedel, 1980; Subrimatus A.J. Wagner, 1907; Vitrea (Crystallus) R. T. Lowe, 1855; Vitrea (Pinterella) A. Riedel, 1980 (original rank); Vitrea (Subrimatus) A. J. Wagner, 1907; Vitrea (Vitrea) Fitzinger, 1833· accepted, alternate representation

= Vitrea =

Genus of gastropods

Vitrea is a genus of small, air-breathing land snails, terrestrial pulmonate gastropod molluscs in the family Pristilomatidae.

== Species ==
This genus contains more than 60 species, including the following:

- † Vitrea ammoni (Clessin, 1894)
- † Vitrea angustaeumbilicata Harzhauser & Neubauer, 2018
- Vitrea angystropha (O. Boettger, 1880)
- Vitrea argolica A. Riedel, 1962
- Vitrea binderi L. Pintér, 1972
- Vitrea botterii (L. Pfeiffer, 1853)
- Vitrea brandti L. Pintér, 1969
- Vitrea bulgarica Damjanov & L. Pintér, 1969
- Vitrea clessini (P. Hesse, 1882)
- Vitrea contortula (Krynicki, 1837)
- Vitrea contracta (Westerlund, 1871)
- Vitrea crystallina (O. F. Müller, 1774)
- Vitrea cyprina Westerlund, 1902
- Vitrea demiobasensis L. Pintér, 1972
- Vitrea diaphana (S. Studer, 1820)
- Vitrea ephesina L. Pintér, 1972
- Vitrea erjaveci (Brusina, 1870)
- Vitrea ernesti A. Riedel & Subai, 2004
- Vitrea etrusca (Paulucci, 1878)
- † Vitrea fagalis Cockerell, 1907
- † Vitrea faustinae (Sacco, 1884)
- Vitrea garganoensis (E. Gittenberger & Eikenboom, 2006)
- Vitrea gasulli A. Riedel & Paul, 1978
- † Vitrea geisserti Schlickum, 1975
- Vitrea gosteliae Gümüş & Neubert, 2012
- Vitrea hattiana (A. Riedel, 1970)
- Vitrea heniae A. Riedel, 1995
- Vitrea ilgazdaglariensis Neubert & Riedel, 1993
- Vitrea illyrica (A. J. Wagner, 1907)
- Vitrea inae de Winter & Ripken, 1991
- Vitrea jetschini (M. Kimakowicz, 1890)
- Vitrea keaana A. Riedel & Mylonas, 1981
- Vitrea kiliasi L. Pintér, 1972
- Vitrea klemmi L. Pintér, 1972
- Vitrea kutschigi (Walderdorff, 1864)
- Vitrea lodosi A. Riedel, 1984
- Vitrea margjuliae A. Riedel, 1976
- Vitrea matsakisi A. Riedel & Mylonas, 1980
- Vitrea megistislavras A. Reischütz & P. L. Reischütz, 2014
- Vitrea meijeri Maassen, 1998
- Vitrea melovskii Dedov, 2021
- Vitrea mikuskai L. Pintér, 1977
- Vitrea minellii L. Pintér & Fo. Giusti, 1983
- Vitrea morgani A. Riedel, 1966
- Vitrea nadejdae Lindholm, 1926
- Vitrea narbonensis (Clessin, 1877)
- Vitrea neglecta Damjanov & L. Pintér, 1969
- Vitrea olympica A. Riedel & Velkovrh, 1976
- Vitrea ossaea L. Pintér, 1983
- Vitrea pageti L. Pintér, 1978
- Vitrea pieperiana L. Pintér, 1977
- Vitrea pinteri A. Riedel & Subai, 1991
- Vitrea politissima Páll-Gergely & Asami, 2015
- Vitrea praetermissa A. Riedel, 1988
- † Vitrea procrystallina (Andreae, 1902)
- Vitrea pseudotrolli L. Pintér, 1983
- Vitrea pygmaea (O. Boettger, 1880)
- Vitrea rhododendronis A. Riedel, 1966
- Vitrea riedeli Damjanov & L. Pintér, 1969
- Vitrea riedeliana O. Paget, 1976
- † Vitrea rothauseni Schlickum & Strauch, 1979
- Vitrea saboorii Neubert & Bössneck, 2013
- Vitrea schneideri A. Riedel & P. L. Reischütz, 1988
- Vitrea schuetti L. Pintér, 1972
- Vitrea selecta L. Pintér, 1972
- Vitrea siveci A. Riedel & Velkovrh, 1976
- Vitrea sorella (Mousson, 1863)
- Vitrea sossellai L. Pintér, 1978
- Vitrea spelaea (A. J. Wagner, 1914)
- Vitrea sporadica L. Pintér, 1978
- † Vitrea steinheimensis Gottschick, 1920
- Vitrea storchi L. Pintér, 1978
- Vitrea striata Norris, Paul & A. Riedel, 1988
- Vitrea sturanyi (A. J. Wagner, 1907)
- Vitrea subaii L. Pintér & A. Riedel, 1973
- Vitrea subcarinata (Clessin, 1877)
- † Vitrea subdiaphana (Clessin, 1885)
- Vitrea subrimata (Reinhardt, 1871)
- † Vitrea subrimatula Wenz, 1921
- Vitrea szekeresi Deli & Subai, 2011
- Vitrea thasia A. Riedel & P. L. Reischütz, 1983
- Vitrea transsylvanica (Clessin, 1877)
- Vitrea trolli (A. J. Wagner, 1922)
- Vitrea ulrichi Georgiev & Dedov, 2014
- Vitrea vereae Irikov, Georgiev & A. Riedel, 2004
- Vitrea zakynthia (P. Hesse, 1882)
- Vitrea zilchi L. Pintér, 1972

== Taxa inquirenda ==
- Vitrea cepedei Dautzenberg, 1908
- Vitrea dalliana (uncertain)
- Vitrea milium (uncertain)
- Vitrea petrophila (uncertain)
- Vitrea placenta Westerlund, 1902 (use in recent literature currently undocumented)
- Vitrea sublimpida E. A. Smith, 1895
- Vitrea wheatleyi (uncertain)

== Synonyms ==
- Vitrea actinophora Dall, 1900 : synonym of Retinella actinophora (Dall, 1900) (original combination)
- Vitrea alliaria (J. S. Miller, 1822) : synonym of Oxychilus alliarius (J. S. Miller, 1822) (unaccepted combination)
- Vitrea approxima B. Walker & Pilsbry, 1902 : synonym of Pilsbryna clingmani (Dall, 1900) (junior synonym)
- Vitrea arborea (Say, 1817) : synonym of Zonitoides arboreus (Say, 1817) (unaccepted combination)
- Vitrea aulacogyra Pilsbry & Ferriss, 1906: synonym of Paravitrea aulacogyra (Pilsbry & Ferriss, 1906)
- Vitrea botteri O. Boettger, 1905: synonym of Vitrea contracta (Westerlund, 1871) (junior homonym, invalid, non Helix botterii L. Pfeiffer, 1853)
- Vitrea capsella (Gould, 1851): synonym of Paravitrea capsella (A. Gould, 1851)
- Vitrea carolinensis (Cockerell, 1890): synonym of Glyphyalinia carolinensis (Cockerell, 1890) (unaccepted combination)
- Vitrea cellarius (O. F. Müller, 1774): synonym of Oxychilus cellarius (O. F. Müller, 1774) (unaccepted combination)
- Vitrea chathamensis (Dall, 1893): synonym of Glyphyalus chathamensis (Dall, 1893) (superseded combination)
- Vitrea clingmani Dall, 1900: synonym of Pilsbryna clingmani (Dall, 1900) (original combination)
- Vitrea cryptomphala G. H. Clapp, 1915: synonym of Glyphyalinia cryptomphala (G. H. Clapp, 1915) (original combination)
- Vitrea draparnaudi (H. Beck, 1837): synonym of Oxychilus draparnaudi (H. Beck, 1837) (unaccepted combination)
- Vitrea emmae Akramowski, 1955: synonym of Oxychilus emmae (Akramowski, 1955) (original combination)
- Vitrea harimensis Pilsbry, 1900: synonym of Urazirochlamys doenitzii (Reinhardt, 1877) (junior synonym)
- Vitrea hawaiiensis Ancey, 1904: synonym of Nesovitrea hawaiiensis (Ancey, 1904) (original combination)
- Vitrea hibernica Kennard, 1907: synonym of Oxychilus cellarius (O. F. Müller, 1774)
- Vitrea implicans (Guppy, 1868): synonym of Miradiscops implicans (Guppy, 1868) (unaccepted combination)
- Vitrea indentata (Say, 1822): synonym of Glyphyalinia indentata (Say, 1822) (unaccepted combination)
- Vitrea johnsoni Dall, 1895: synonym of Pristiloma johnsoni (Dall, 1895) (original combination)
- Vitrea lanaiensis Sykes, 1897: synonym of Nesovitrea pauxilla (A. Gould, 1852) (junior synonym)
- † Vitrea leia Newton & G. F. Harris, 1894: synonym of † Oxychilus leia (Newton & G. F. Harris, 1894) (superseded combination)
- Vitrea lepta Westerlund, 1902 synonym of Vitrea contracta (Westerlund, 1871) (junior synonym)
- Vitrea lewisiana G. H. Clapp, 1908: synonym of Glyphyalinia lewisiana (G. H. Clapp, 1908) (original combination)
- Vitrea lucida (Draparnaud, 1801): synonym of Oxychilus draparnaudi (H. Beck, 1837) (unaccepted combination)
- Vitrea lunti E. A. Smith, 1898: synonym of Miradiscops lunti (E. A. Smith, 1898) (original combination)
- Vitrea molokaiensis Sykes, 1897 synonym of Nesovitrea molokaiensis (Sykes, 1897) (original combination)
- Vitrea orotis S. S. Berry, 1930: synonym of Pristiloma orotis (S. S. Berry, 1930) (original combination)
- Vitrea pauxillus (A. Gould, 1852): synonym of Nesovitrea pauxilla (A. Gould, 1852) ( superseded combination)
- Vitrea podolica Clessin, 1880: synonym of Vitrea crystallina (O. F. Müller, 1774) (junior synonym)
- Vitrea raderi Dall, 1898: synonym of Glyphyalinia raderi (Dall, 1898) (original combination)
- Vitrea radiatula (Alder, 1830): synonym of Retinella radiatula (Alder, 1830) : synonym of Perpolita hammonis (Strøm, 1765) (unaccepted combination)
- Vitrea rhoadsi Pilsbry, 1899: synonym of Glyphyalinia rhoadsi (Pilsbry, 1899) (original combination)
- Vitrea scharffi Kennard, 1908 : synonym of Oxychilus cellarius (O. F. Müller, 1774)
- † Vitrea sconciensis (J. S. Gardner, 1885): synonym of † Oxychilus sconciensis (J. S. Gardner, 1885) (superseded combination)
- † Vitrea sinoparum Cockerell, 1914: synonym of † Microphysula sinoparum (Cockerell, 1914) (superseded combination)
- Vitrea stopnevichi Rosen, 1925: synonym of Conulopolita stopnevichi (Rosen, 1925) (original combination)
- Vitrea subrupicola (Dall, 1877): synonym of Pristiloma subrupicola (Dall, 1877) ( superseded combination)
- Vitrea tratanensis Jousseaume, 1894: synonym of Macrochlamys tratanensis (Jousseaume, 1894) (original combination)
- Vitrea umbratilis (Guppy, 1868): synonym of Pseudohyalina umbratilis (Guppy, 1868) (unaccepted combination)
- Vitrea vanattai B. Walker & Pilsbry, 1902: synonym of Pilsbryna vanattai (B. Walker & Pilsbry, 1902) (original combination)
- Vitrea viridis Westerlund, 1897: synonym of Vitrea contortula (Krynicki, 1837) (junior synonym)
