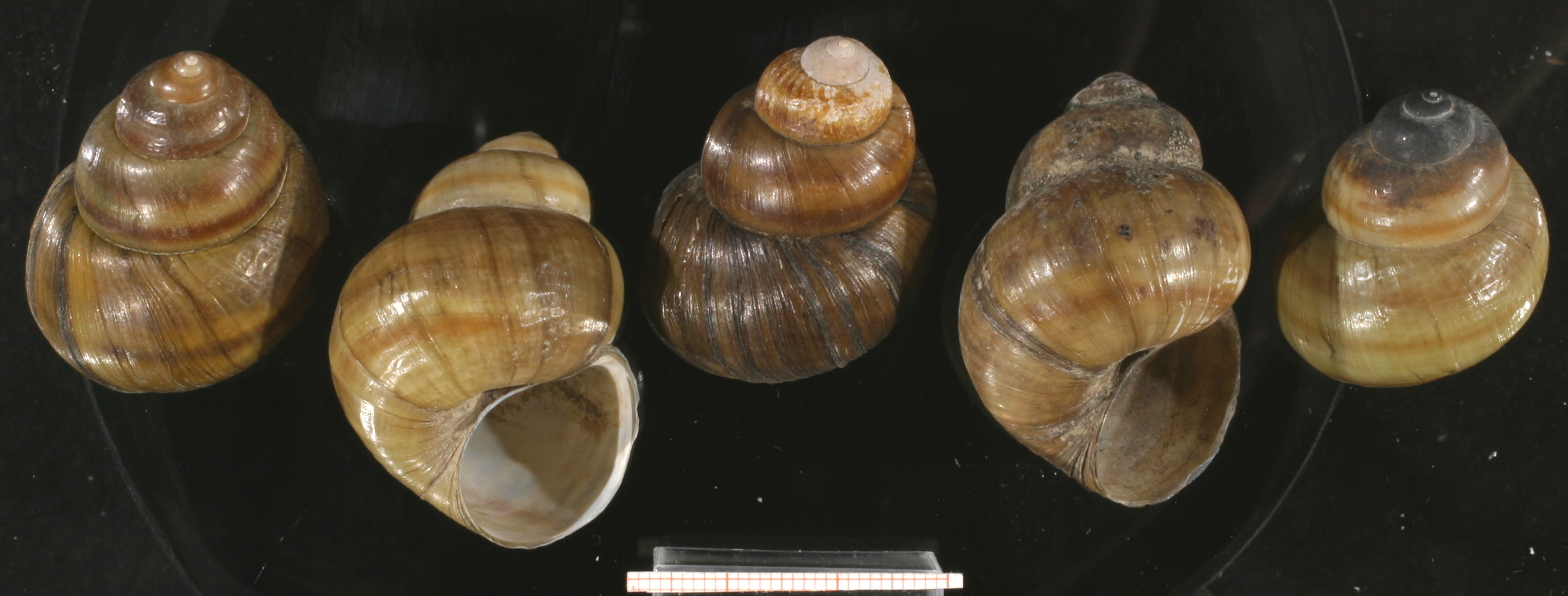
- Five shells of Viviparus acerosus

Conservation status
- Least Concern (IUCN 3.1)

Scientific classification
- Kingdom: Animalia
- Phylum: Mollusca
- Class: Gastropoda
- Subclass: Caenogastropoda
- Order: Architaenioglossa
- Family: Viviparidae
- Genus: Viviparus
- Species: V. acerosus

Binomial name
- Viviparus acerosus (Bourguignat, 1862)

= Viviparus acerosus =

Species of gastropod

Viviparus acerosus is a species of freshwater snail with an operculum, an aquatic gastropod mollusk in the family Viviparidae, the river snails.

== Distribution ==
The distribution of this species is Danubian.

It is found in Austria, Bulgaria, Croatia, Czech Republic (in Moravia only), Slovakia, Germany, Hungary and Romania.

Its non-indigenous distribution includes the Netherlands since 2007.
