= Deroceras sturanyi =

Conservation status
- Least Concern (IUCN 3.1)

Scientific classification
- Kingdom: Animalia
- Phylum: Mollusca
- Class: Gastropoda
- Order: Stylommatophora
- Family: Agriolimacidae
- Genus: Deroceras
- Species: D. sturanyi

Binomial name
- Deroceras sturanyi (Simroth, 1894)

Species of gastropod

Deroceras sturanyi is a species of air-breathing land slug, a terrestrial pulmonate gastropod mollusk in the family Agriolimacidae.

== Distribution ==
This species is listed in the IUCN Red list as Least concern (LC)

It occurs in countries including:

- Czech Republic
- Bulgaria
- Netherlands
- Poland
- Slovakia
- Ukraine
- and others
