= Troglovitrea =

Scientific classification
- Kingdom: Animalia
- Phylum: Mollusca
- Class: Gastropoda
- Order: Stylommatophora
- Family: Pristilomatidae
- Genus: Troglovitrea; Negrea & Riedel, 1968
- Species: T. argintarui

Binomial name
- Troglovitrea argintarui Negrea & Riedel, 1968

Genus of land snails

Troglovitrea is a monotypic genus of gastropods belonging to the family Pristilomatidae. The only species is Troglovitrea argintarui. the genus and the species Troglovitrea argintauri were both discovered by Dr. Alexandrina Negrea and Adolf Riedel in 1968.

== Description ==
The species is found in southwest Romania. The size of an adult can range between 4-5 millimeters.
