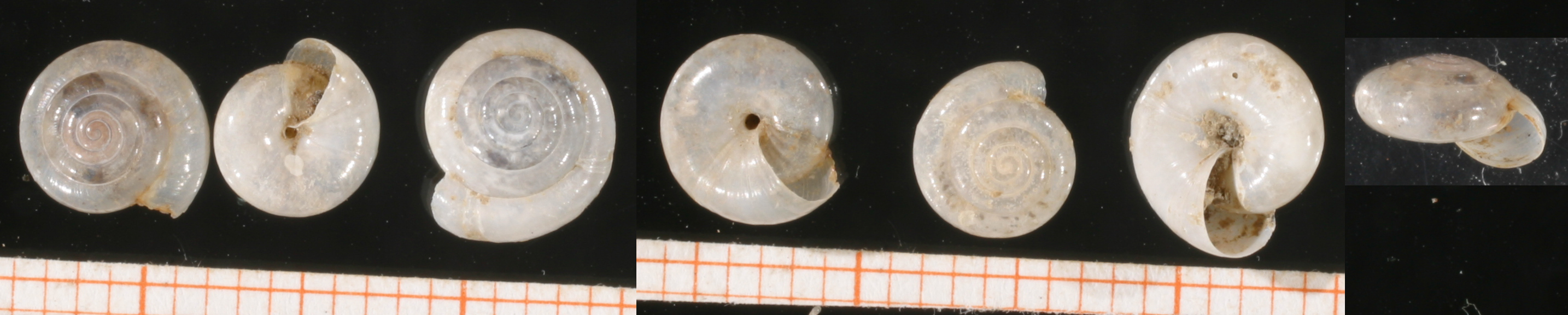

Scientific classification
- Kingdom: Animalia
- Phylum: Mollusca
- Class: Gastropoda
- Order: Stylommatophora
- Family: Oxychilidae
- Genus: Mediterranea
- Species: M. inopinata

Binomial name
- Mediterranea inopinata (Uličný, 1887)

Synonyms
- Hyalina inopinata Uličný, 1887 (original combination); Hyalina opinata Clessin, 1887 (junior synonym); Oxychilus (Riedelius) inopinatus (Uličný, 1887) (unaccepted combination)

= Mediterranea inopinata =

Species of gastropod

Mediterranea inopinata is a species of small land snail, a terrestrial pulmonate gastropod mollusc in the family Oxychilidae, the glass snails.

== Distribution and conservation status ==
This species is not listed in IUCN red list - not evaluated (NE).

It occurs in:

- Czech Republic - near threatened (NT) in Bohemia, least concern (LC) in Moravia
- Bulgaria
- Poland - endangered (EN)
- Slovakia
- Ukraine
- and others
