= Gollumia =

Scientific classification
- Domain: Eukaryota
- Kingdom: Animalia
- Phylum: Mollusca
- Class: Gastropoda
- Order: Stylommatophora
- Family: Pristilomatidae
- Genus: Gollumia; Riedel, 1988

Genus of gastropods

Gollumia is a genus of gastropods belonging to the family Pristilomatidae.

The species of this genus inhabits terrestrial environments.

Species:

- Gollumia applanata Schütt, 2001
- Gollumia filocincta (P.Hesse, 1915)
- Gollumia torumbilicata Schütt, 2001
