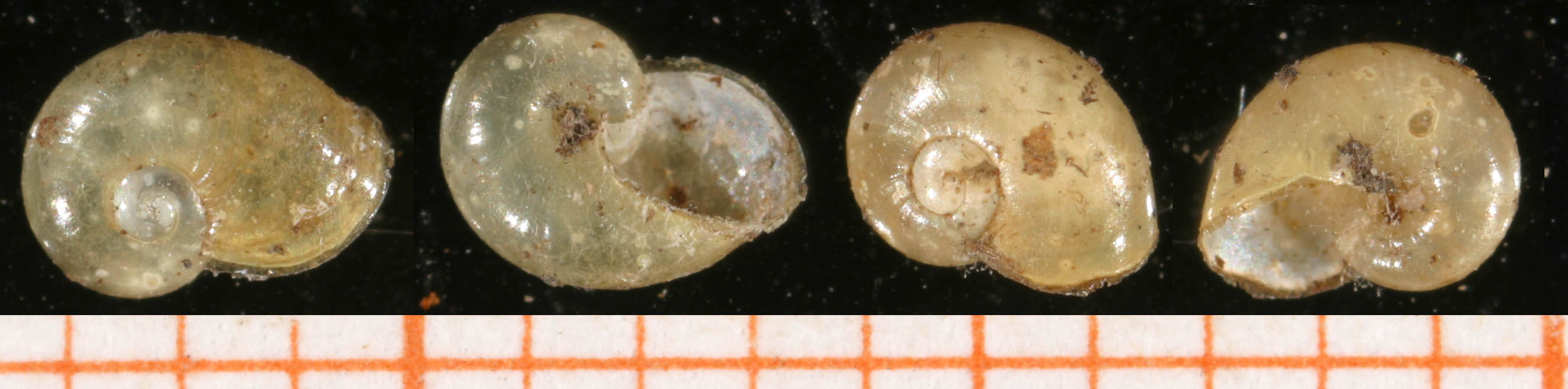
- shells of Daudebardia brevipes

Scientific classification
- Kingdom: Animalia
- Phylum: Mollusca
- Class: Gastropoda
- Order: Stylommatophora
- Family: Oxychilidae
- Genus: Daudebardia
- Species: D. brevipes

Binomial name
- Daudebardia brevipes (Draparnaud, 1805)

= Daudebardia brevipes =

Species of gastropod

Daudebardia brevipes is a species of air-breathing land snail or semi-slug, a terrestrial pulmonate gastropod mollusk in the family Oxychilidae which belongs to the "Limacoid clade".

== Distribution ==
The distribution of this species is central-European and southern-European.

It occurs in:

- Czech Republic
- Slovakia
- Ukraine
