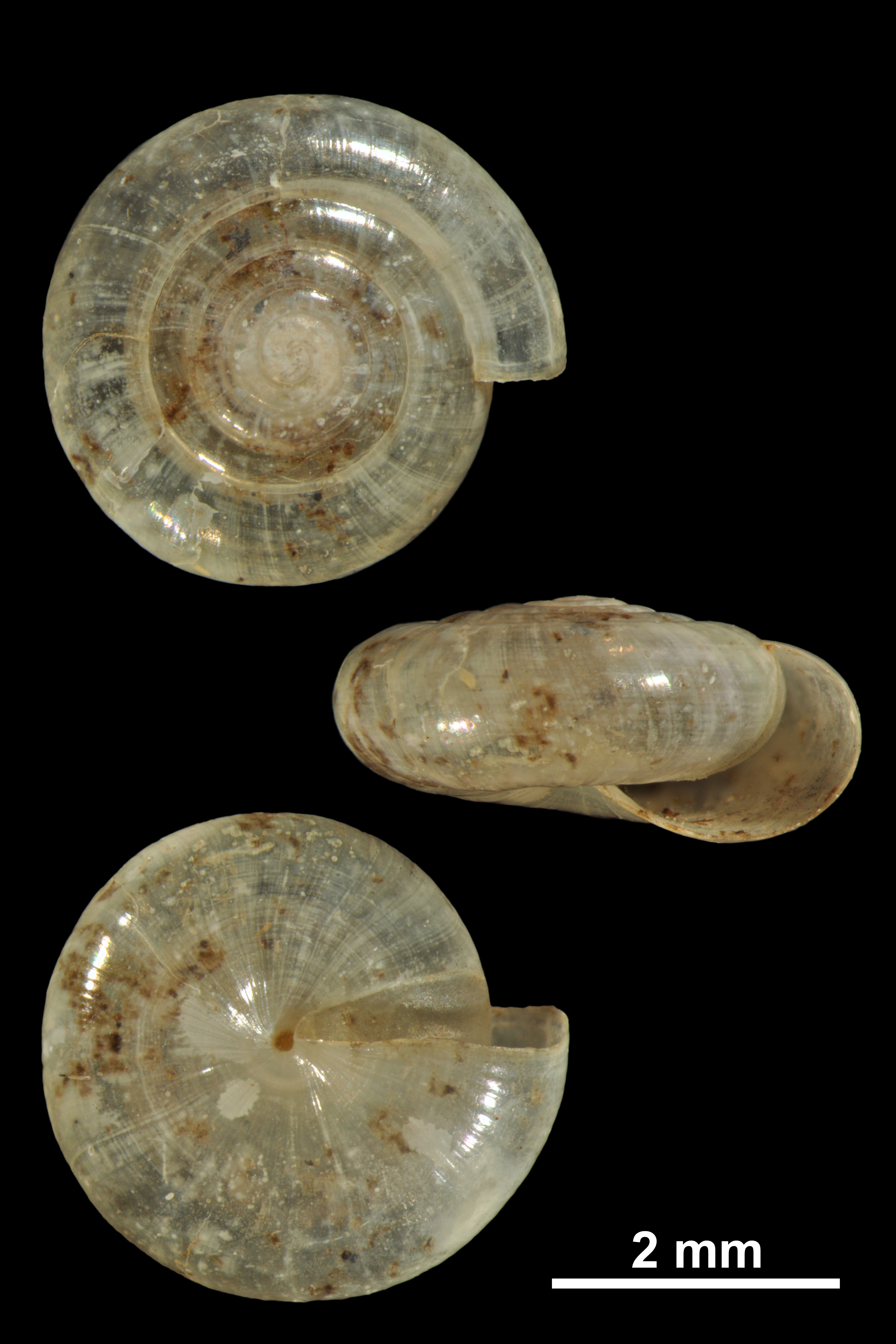
- Shell of Vitrea subrimata (specimen at MNHN, Paris)

Conservation status
- Critically Endangered (IUCN 3.1)

Scientific classification
- Kingdom: Animalia
- Phylum: Mollusca
- Class: Gastropoda
- Order: Stylommatophora
- Superfamily: Gastrodontoidea
- Family: Pristilomatidae
- Genus: Vitrea
- Species: V. subrimata

Binomial name
- Vitrea subrimata (Reinhardt, 1871)

Synonyms
- Crystallus sphaeroconus A. J. Wagner, 1907 (junior synonym); Crystallus subrimatus (Reinhardt, 1871); Crystallus subrimatus inflatus A. J. Wagner, 1907 (junior synonym); Hyalina subrimata Reinhardt, 1871 (original combination); Hyalinia (Vitrea) reitteri O. Boettger, 1880 junior subjective synonym; Hyalinia hyblensis Kobelt, 1881 (junior synonym); Hyalinia maritae M. Kimakowicz, 1890 ·(junior synonym); Vitrea (Subrimatus) subrimata (Reinhardt, 1871) ·

= Vitrea subrimata =

Species of gastropod

Vitrea subrimata is a small, air-breathing land snail species, a terrestrial pulmonate gastropod mollusk in the family Pristilomatidae.

Subspecies

- Vitrea subrimata litoralis (Clessin, 1877)

== Description ==
The shell is small: 1.3-2.2 mm x 2.5–5 mm (diameter 2.6-2.7 mm at 3 whorls, 3.5-3.8 mm at 4 whorls)

The shell is colourless and transparent. It contains 4-5 whorls. The width of the body whorl as seen from above is 1.2-1.7 times that of the penultimate whorl. The umbilicus is very narrow but is present (different from Vitrea diaphana). The columellar margin is pointed and slightly protruding, covering the umbilicus very weakly. The shell is very variable, except for the characteristic form of the columellar margin at the umbilicus. The morphological variation has been associated with subspecies, but the nature of the variation is not yet understood. Two forms may co-occur with and without intermediates, other populations may consist of only one form.

== Distribution ==
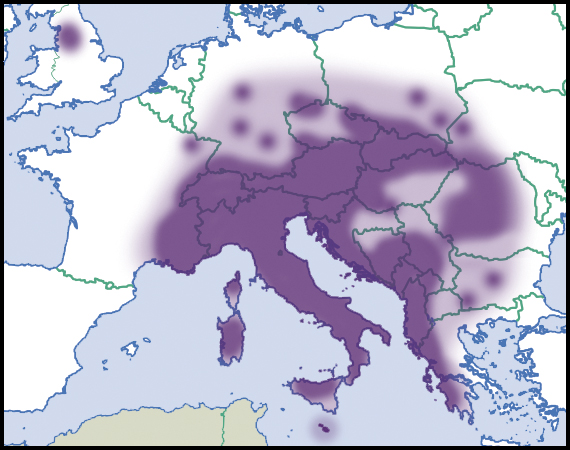
Distribution in Europe of Vitrea subrimata

The distribution of this species is alpine and southern European.

This species occurs in countries and islands including:

- Czech Republic
- Ukraine
- Great Britain, notably the Great Asby Scar.

This species can be found in humid mountain forests under leaf litter, stones or crevices, usually on calcareous substrate, rocks and rock rubble, up to 2600 m. In Bulgaria, it is recorded from 2000 m; in England, it is recorded in open habitats, between 250 and 600 m.
