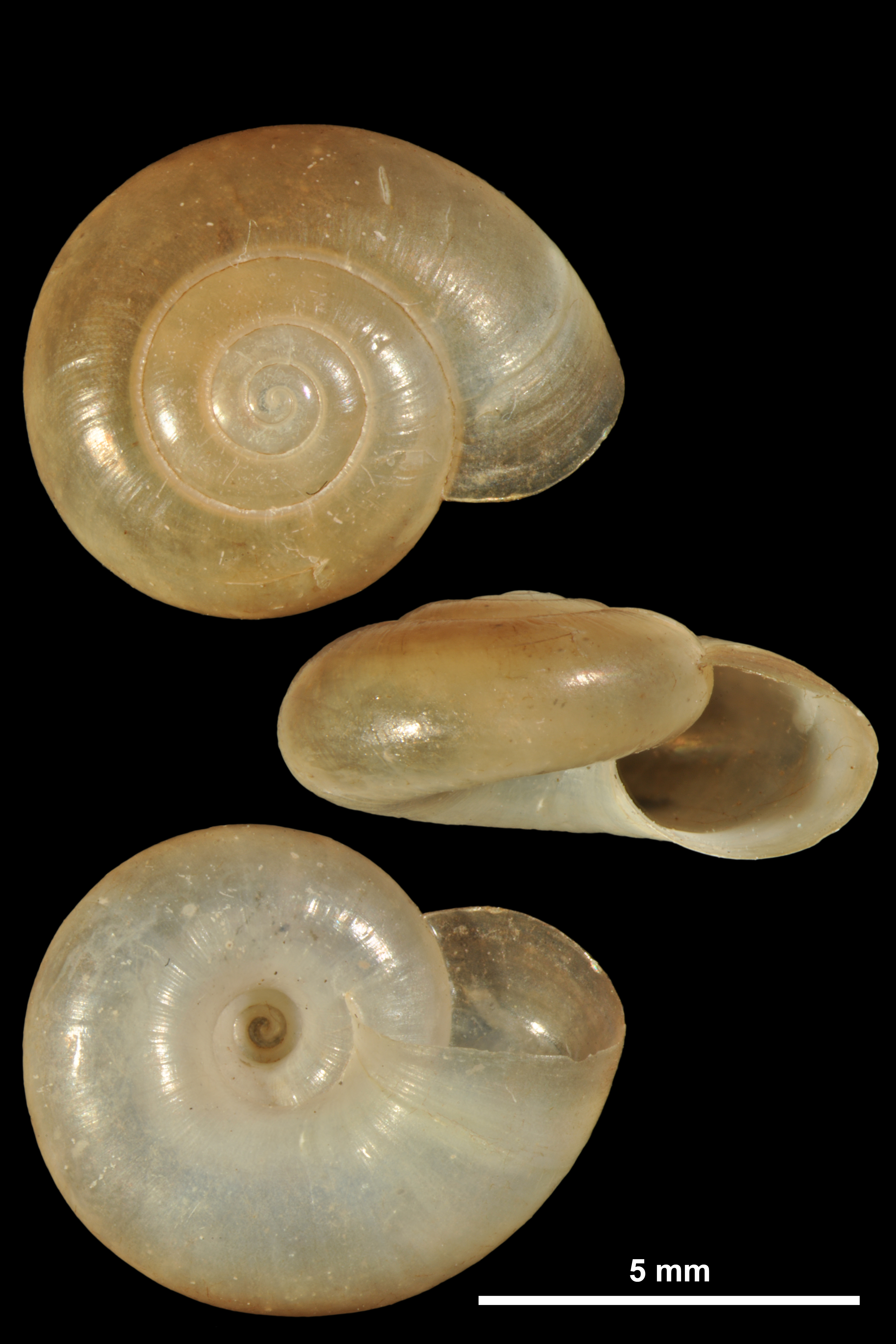
- Shell of Aegopinella minor (specimen at MNHN, paris)

Scientific classification
- Kingdom: Animalia
- Phylum: Mollusca
- Class: Gastropoda
- Order: Stylommatophora
- Family: Gastrodontidae
- Genus: Aegopinella
- Species: A. minor

Binomial name
- Aegopinella minor (Stabile, 1864)
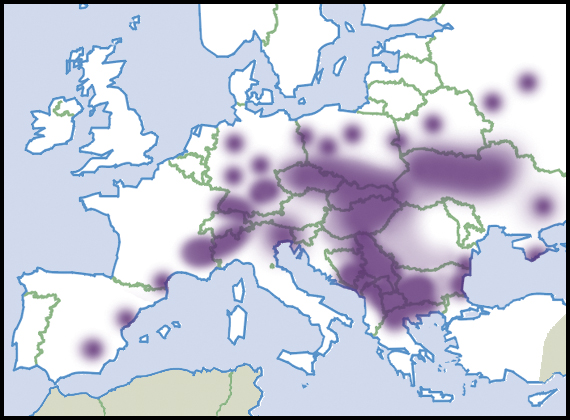

Synonyms
- Aegopinella inermis A. J. Wagner, 1907 (junior synonym); Hyalina nitens inermis A. J. Wagner, 1907 (junior synonym); Hyalina nitens var. minor Stabile, 1864 (basionym); Hyalinia (Polita) stauropolitana O. von Rosen, 1903 (junior synonym); Hyalinia stauropolitana Rosen, 1903 (junior synonym)

= Aegopinella minor =

Species of gastropod

Aegopinella minor is a species of small land snail, a terrestrial pulmonate gastropod mollusk in the family Gastrodontidae, the glass snails.

== Description ==
The diameter of the shell attains 8.5 mm (0.33 in), its height 3.5 mm (0.14 in).

(Original description in German of Hyalina nitens inermis) The shell is generally smaller than the typical form, with a flatter shape and a wider umbilicus. The spire is lower, consisting of 4.5 to 5 not very convex whorls, including the body whorl. These whorls increase more slowly and regularly in size. The body whorl is more compressed and gradually widens towards the aperture, descending less at the front. The insertions of the aperture margin are less closely spaced.

(Original description in Latin of Hyalinia (Polita) stauropolitana O. von Rosen, 1903) The shell is closely related to Aegopinella pura (Alder, 1830), but it is larger and more depressed. It is yellowish, shiny, and transparent. The shell consists of 5 to 5.5 whorls, with the body whorl being more extended.

== Distribution ==
This species occurs in the Czech Republic, Ukraine and other countries: mostly Central Europe and Eastern Europe to the Caucasus; also in Northern Greece; isolated sighting in Catalonia.
