= Lindbergia (gastropod) =

Scientific classification
- Domain: Eukaryota
- Kingdom: Animalia
- Phylum: Mollusca
- Class: Gastropoda
- Order: Stylommatophora
- Family: Pristilomatidae
- Genus: Lindbergia; Riedel, 1959

Genus of land snails

Lindbergia is a genus of gastropods belonging to the family Pristilomatidae.

The species of this genus are found in Mediterranean.

Species:

- Lindbergia beroni A.Riedel, 1984
- Lindbergia gittenbergeri L.Pintér & A.Riedel, 1983
- Lindbergia karainensis Rähle & Riedel, 1987
- Lindbergia orbicularis (A.Riedel, 1962)
- Lindbergia pageti A.Riedel, 1968
- Lindbergia parnonensis E.Gittenberger, 2008
- Lindbergia pinteri A.Riedel, 1981
- Lindbergia pseudoillyrica A.Riedel, 1960
- Lindbergia spiliaenymphis A.Riedel, 1959
- Lindbergia stylokamarae A.Riedel, 1981
