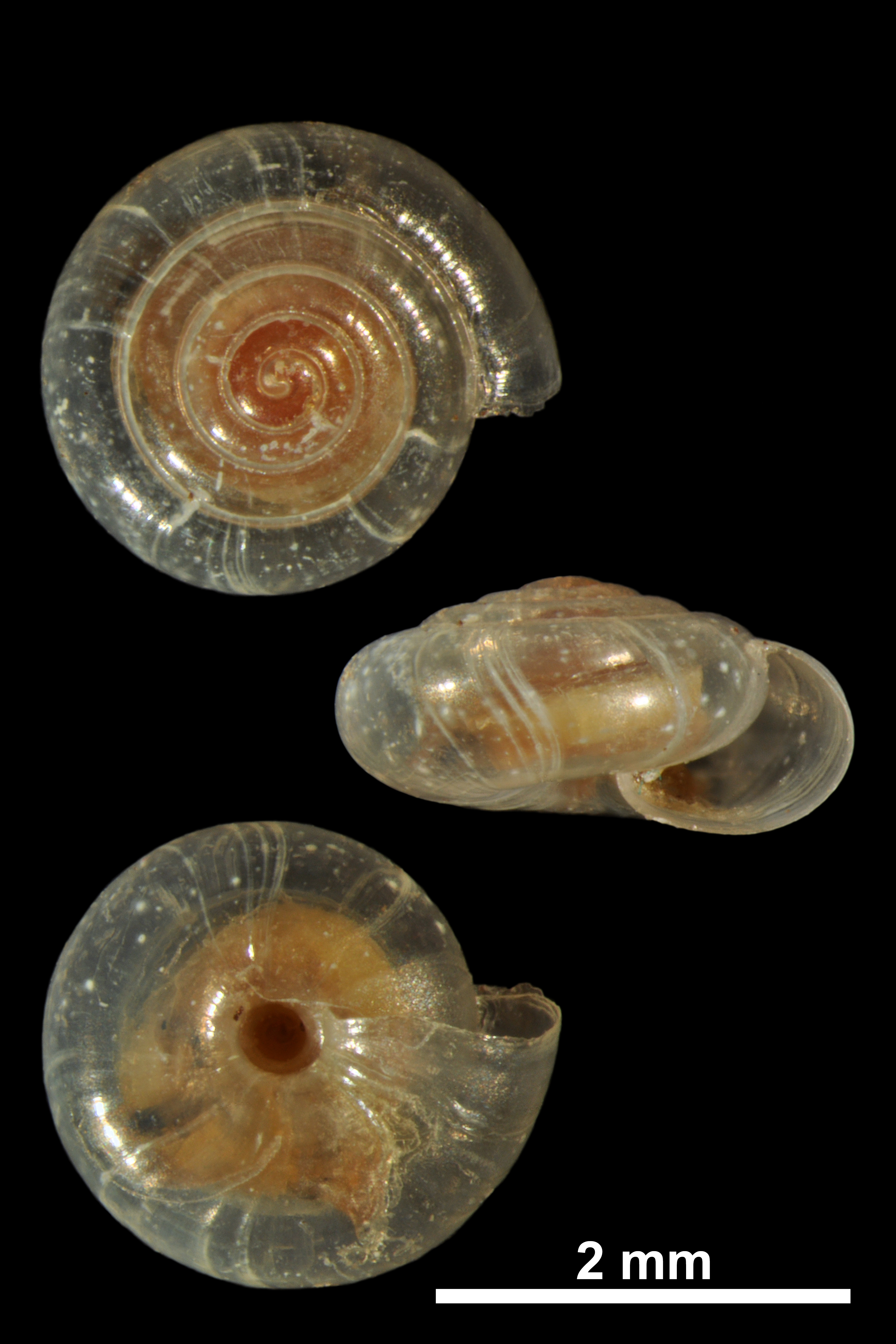
- Shell of Vitrea contracta (specimen at MNHN. Paris)

Conservation status
- Least Concern (IUCN 3.1) (Europe regional assessment)

- Secure (NatureServe)

Scientific classification
- Kingdom: Animalia
- Phylum: Mollusca
- Class: Gastropoda
- Order: Stylommatophora
- Superfamily: Gastrodontoidea
- Family: Pristilomatidae
- Genus: Vitrea
- Species: V. contracta

Binomial name
- Vitrea contracta (Westerlund, 1871)

Synonyms
- Crystallus contractus (Westerlund, 1871); Crystallus contractus subcontractus Wagner, 1907; Hyalina dubrueili Clessin, 1877; Hyalinia (Vitrea) blanci (Hesse, 1882); Hyalinia (Vitrea) contracta (Westerlund, 1871); Hyalinia (Vitrea) contracta var. dubrueili Clessin, 1877; Hyalinia (Vitrea) mica Westerlund, 1886; Hyalinia (Vitrea) permodesta (Bourguignat, 1880); Hyalinia (Vitrea) vitreola (Bourguignat, 1880); Hyalinia (Vitrea) zakynthia Hesse, 1882; Hyalinia abchasica Retowski, 1914; Hyalinia blanci Hesse, 1882; Hyalinia zakynthia Hesse, 1882; Vitrea (Crystallus) contracta (Westerlund, 1871); Vitrea (Crystallus) zapateri Westerlund, 1898; Vitrea botteri Boettger, 1905; Vitrea lepta Westerlund, 1902; Vitrea zakynthia (Hesse, 1882); Zonites crystallina var. contracta Westerlund, 1871; Zonites permodestus Bourguignat, 1880; Zonites vitreolus Bourguignat, 1880

= Vitrea contracta =

Species of gastropod

Vitrea contracta, commonly known as the milky crystal snail or contracted grass snail, is a species of small land snail in the family Pristilomatidae.
