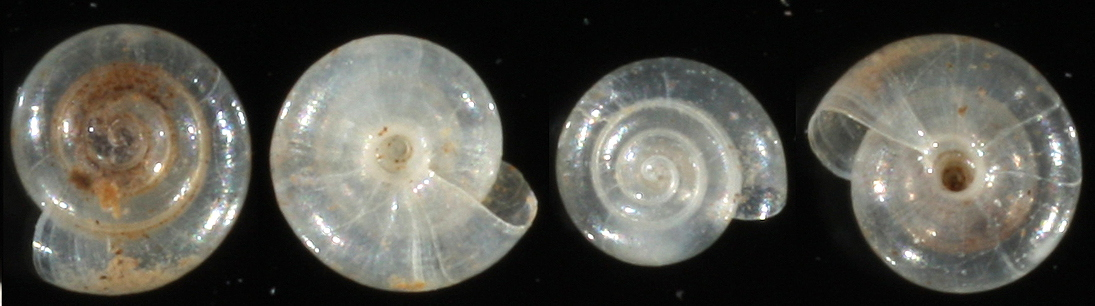
- Shell of Vitrea pygmaea

Scientific classification
- Kingdom: Animalia
- Phylum: Mollusca
- Class: Gastropoda
- Order: Stylommatophora
- Superfamily: Gastrodontoidea
- Family: Pristilomatidae
- Genus: Vitrea
- Species: V. pygmaea

Binomial name
- Vitrea pygmaea (Boettger, 1880)

Synonyms
- Hyalinia pygmaea O. Boettger, 1880

= Vitrea pygmaea =

Species of gastropod

Vitrea pygmaea is a species of gastropods belonging to the family Pristilomatidae.

== Description ==
The shell is very small: 0.7-0.8 mm x 1.4-2.1 mm. It is colourless, sometimes slightly pale greenish yellow. The shell contains 3.5-4 whorls. The body whorl is twice as wide as penultimate whorl, or even more. The umbilicus is very wide and perspectivical, all whorls well visible inside. This species can usually not be confounded with any other species.

== Distribution ==
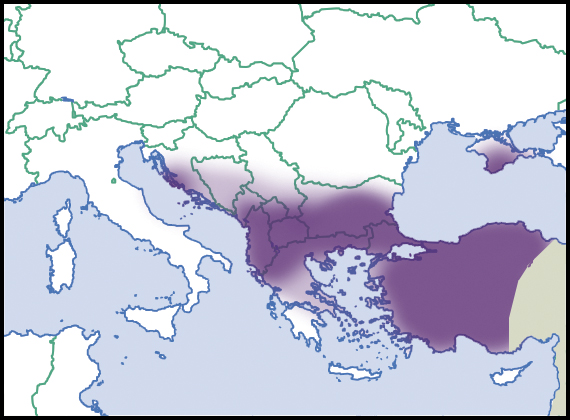
Distribution of Vitrea pygmaea

The species inhabits Turkmenistan, Northern Iran, Iraq-Kurdistan, Caucasus region, Crimea, Turkey, Bulgaria, Croatia, Albania, Greece, possibly also Italy. The type locality is contained in Georgia.

This species can be found in deciduous oak/hornbeam and pinetree forests with pH 4.5. It can survive continuous periods of drought. In Bulgaria it occurs between 300 and 1400 m.
