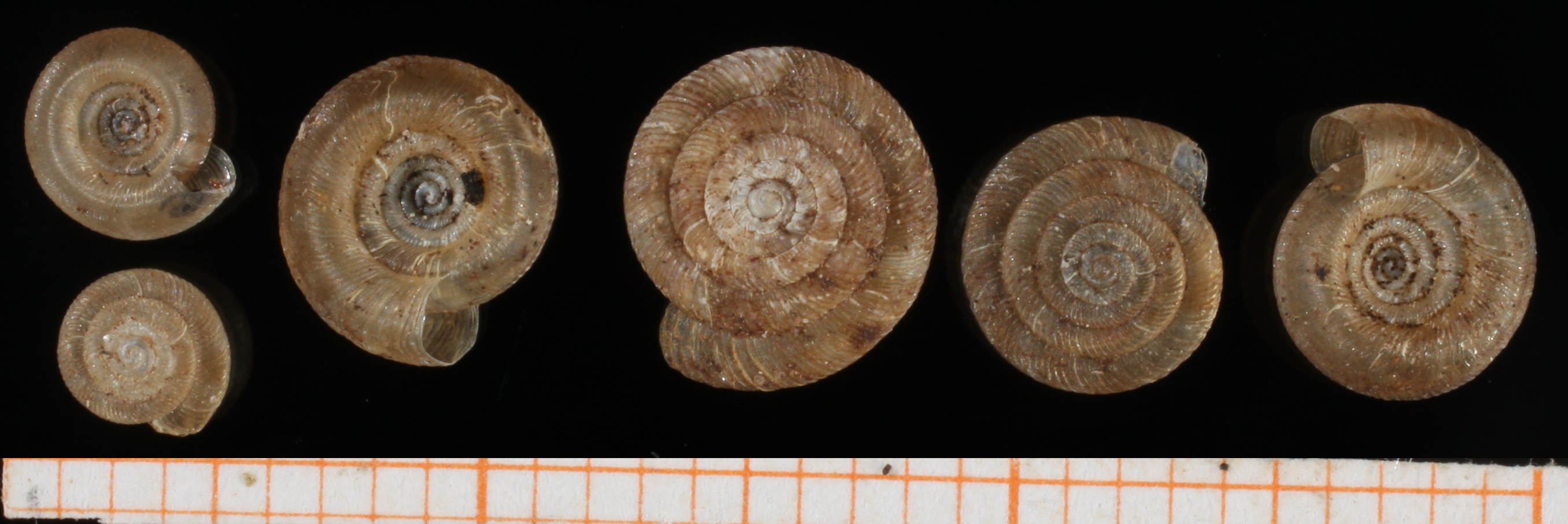
- Discus perspectivus

Scientific classification
- Domain: Eukaryota
- Kingdom: Animalia
- Phylum: Mollusca
- Class: Gastropoda
- Order: Stylommatophora
- Family: Discidae
- Genus: Discus
- Species: D. perspectivus

Binomial name
- Discus perspectivus (Megerle von Mühlfeld, 1816)

Synonyms
- Helix perspectiva Megerle von Mühlfeld, 1816

= Discus perspectivus =

Species of gastropod

Discus perspectivus is a species of small air-breathing land snail, a terrestrial pulmonate gastropod mollusk in the family Discidae, the disk snails.

== Distribution ==
This species occurs in:

- Czech Republic
- Ukraine
