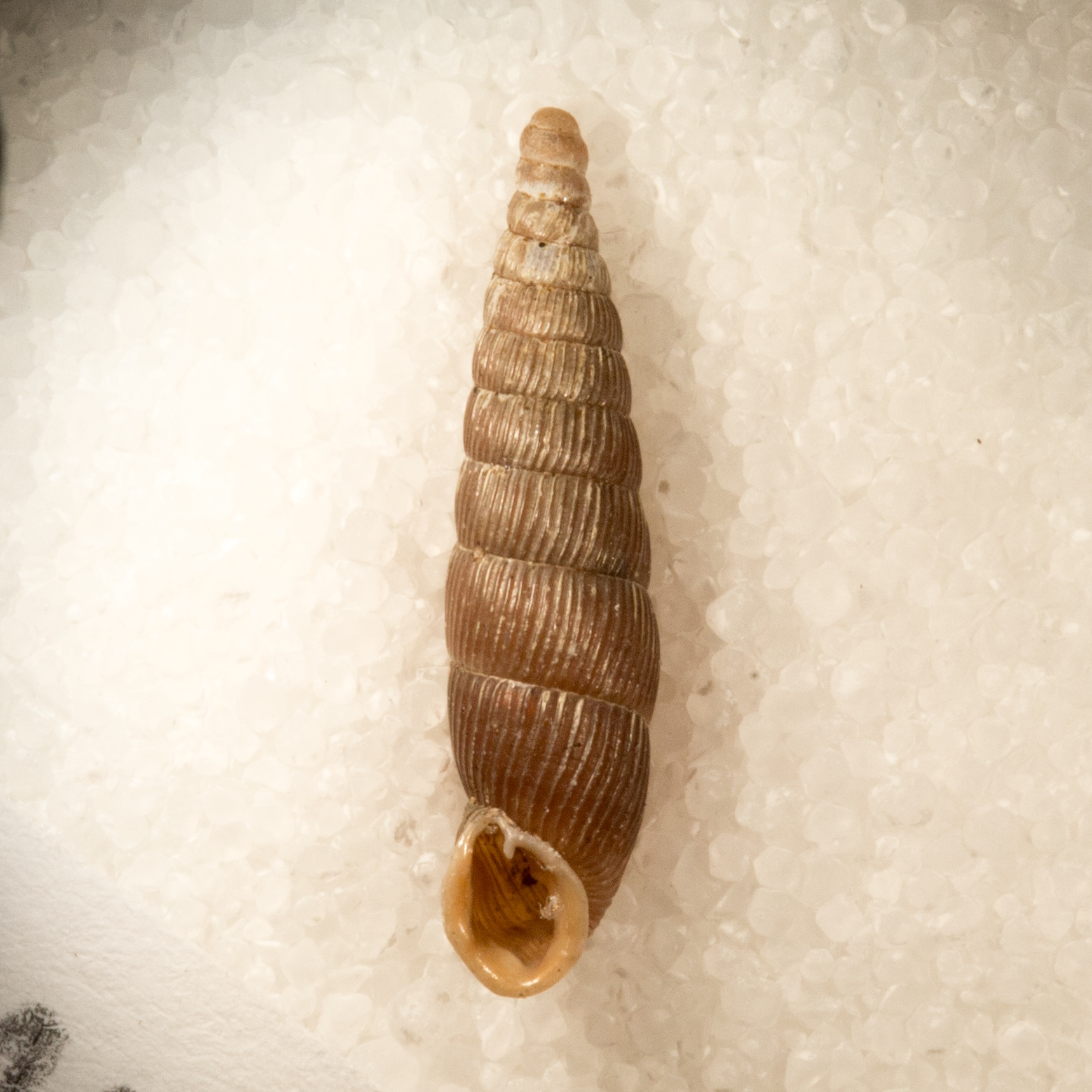
- Basal view of Clausilia pumila shell

Scientific classification
- Kingdom: Animalia
- Phylum: Mollusca
- Class: Gastropoda
- Order: Stylommatophora
- Family: Clausiliidae
- Genus: Clausilia
- Species: C. pumila

Binomial name
- Clausilia pumila C. Pfeiffer, 1828

= Clausilia pumila =

Species of gastropod

Clausilia pumila is a species of air-breathing land snail, a terrestrial pulmonate gastropod mollusk in the family Clausiliidae.

== Distribution ==
This species occurs in:

- Czech Republic
- Ukraine
