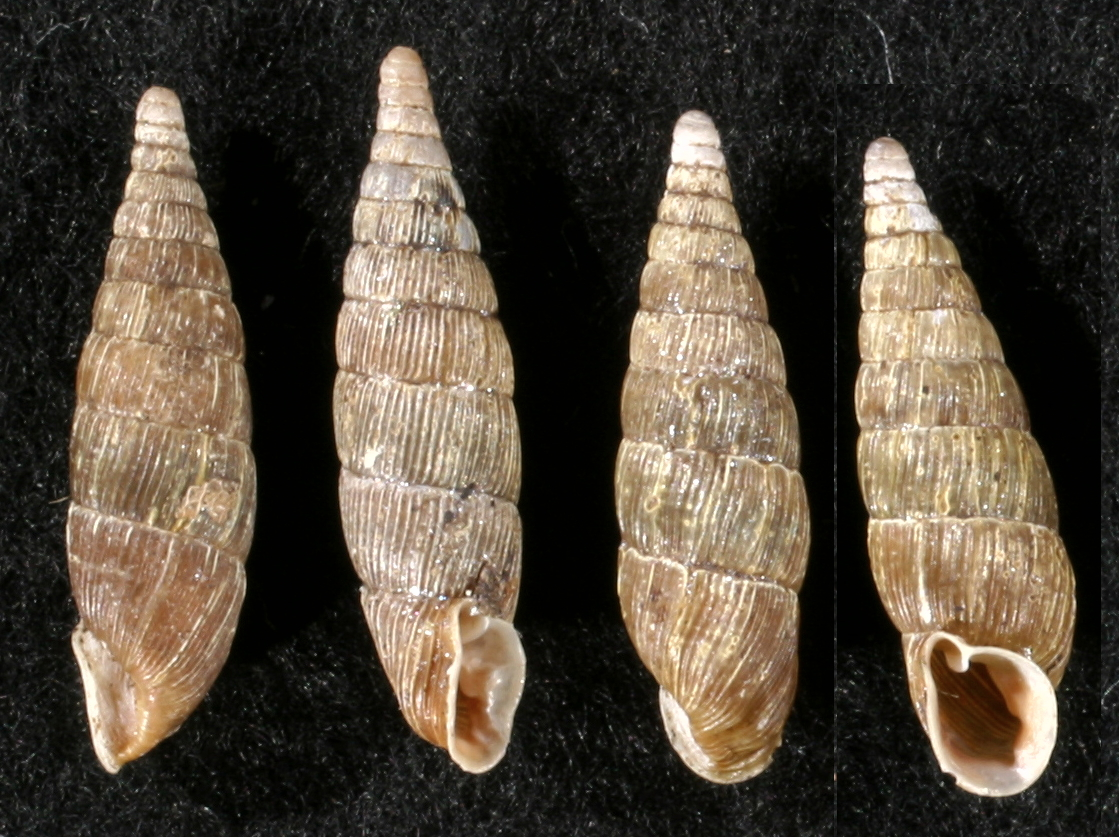
- Shell of Alinda fallax

Scientific classification
- Kingdom: Animalia
- Phylum: Mollusca
- Class: Gastropoda
- Order: Stylommatophora
- Family: Clausiliidae
- Genus: Alinda
- Species: A. fallax

Binomial name
- Alinda fallax (Rossmässler, 1836)
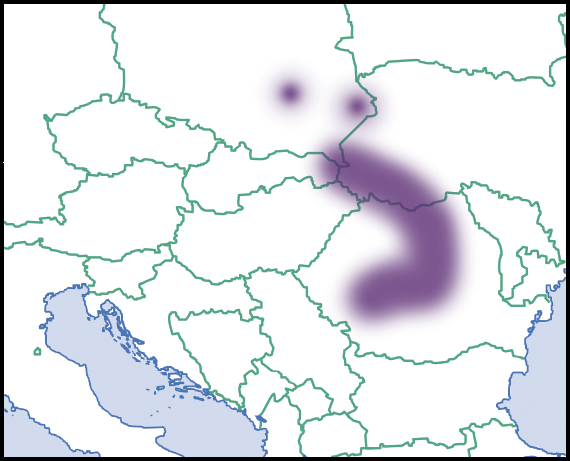

Synonyms
- Alinda (Alinda) fallax (Rossmässler, 1836); Alinda (Pseudalinda) fallax (Rossmässler, 1836) · alternative representation; Balea (Pseudalinda) fallax (Rossmässler, 1836); Clausilia (Pseudalinda) fallax Rossmässler, 1836 superseded combination; Clausilia (Pseudalinda) fallax mut. viridana M. Kimakowicz, 1883 junior subjective synonym; Clausilia fallax Rossmässler, 1836 (original combination); Clausilia obscura A. Schmidt, 1868 (junior synonym); Pseudalinda (Pseudalinda) fallax (Rossmässler, 1836) (superseded generic combination)

= Alinda fallax =

Species of gastropod

Alinda fallax is a species of air-breathing land snail, a terrestrial pulmonate gastropod mollusk in the family Clausiliidae, the door snails.

== Description ==
The length of the shell varies between 14 mm and 22 mm, its diameter between 4 mm and 5.5 mm.

(Original description in Latin) The shell features a barely visible fissure and has a fusiform, swollen shape with small ribs, broad in form, and a brownish-horn color. The aperture is wide and rounded-pyriform, with a swollen spire and a crested base. The peristome is continuous, with a solitary, reflexed, reddish edge. The lower lamella is set apart, and there are two upper palatal folds, with the lower posterior fold being very short. A crescent-shaped fold is incomplete, and the columellar fold is slightly submerged. The area surrounding the umbilicus is hemispherical.

== Distribution ==
This species occurs in Eastern and Southeastern Europe.
