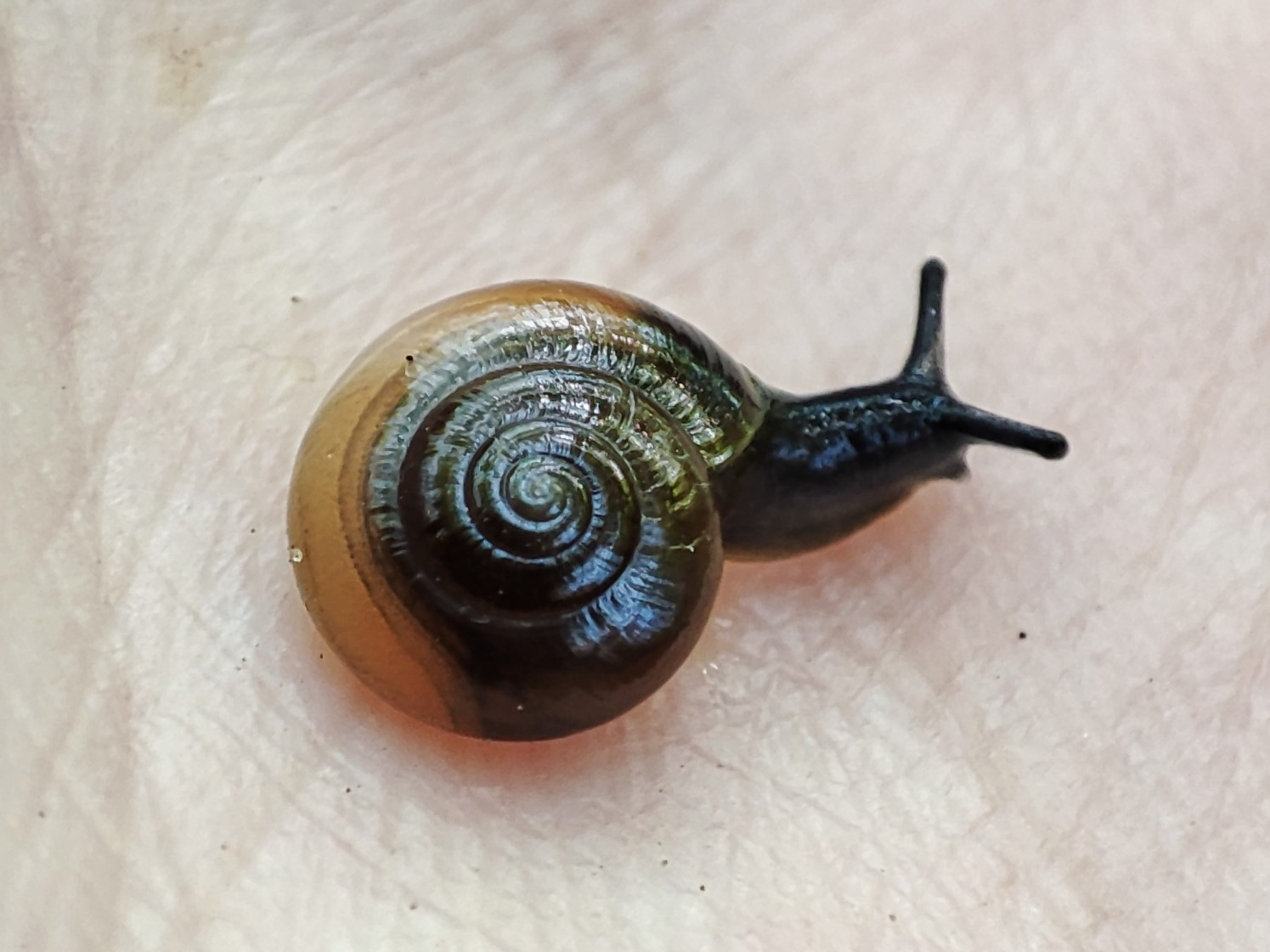

Scientific classification
- Domain: Eukaryota
- Kingdom: Animalia
- Phylum: Mollusca
- Class: Gastropoda
- Order: Stylommatophora
- Family: Oxychilidae
- Genus: Oxychilus
- Species: O. translucidus

Binomial name
- Oxychilus translucidus (Mortillet, 1853)
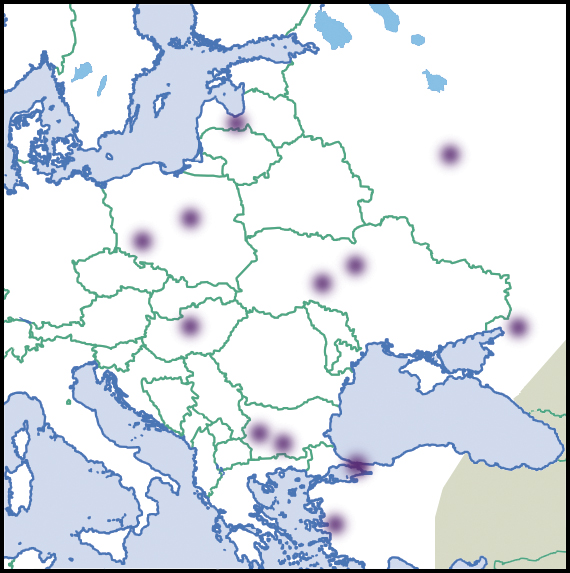
- Native range

= Oxychilus translucidus =

Species of gastropod

Oxychilus translucidus is a species of gastropods belonging to the family Oxychilidae.

The species is found in Europe.
