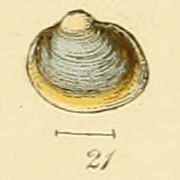

Conservation status
- Least Concern (IUCN 3.1)

Scientific classification
- Kingdom: Animalia
- Phylum: Mollusca
- Class: Bivalvia
- Order: Sphaeriida
- Family: Sphaeriidae
- Genus: Pisidium
- Species: P. obtusale

Binomial name
- Pisidium obtusale (Lamarck, 1818)

= Pisidium obtusale =

Species of bivalve

Pisidium obtusale is a species of freshwater bivalve from family Sphaeriidae.

== Description ==
The 2.5–3.5mm. shell is very tumid (swollen). It is an angular-oval shape with broad, rounded umbos which are behind the midpoint. The surface (periostracum) is glossy with fine concentric striae. Numerous pores are visible inside the shell. The colour is whitish to yellowish often coated with a red-brown deposit.

== Distribution ==
Its native distribution is Holarctic.

- Czech Republic – in Bohemia, in Moravia, near threatened (NT)
- Germany – (Arten der Vorwarnliste)
- Nordic countries: Denmark, Faroes, Finland, Iceland, Norway and Sweden
- Great Britain and Ireland
