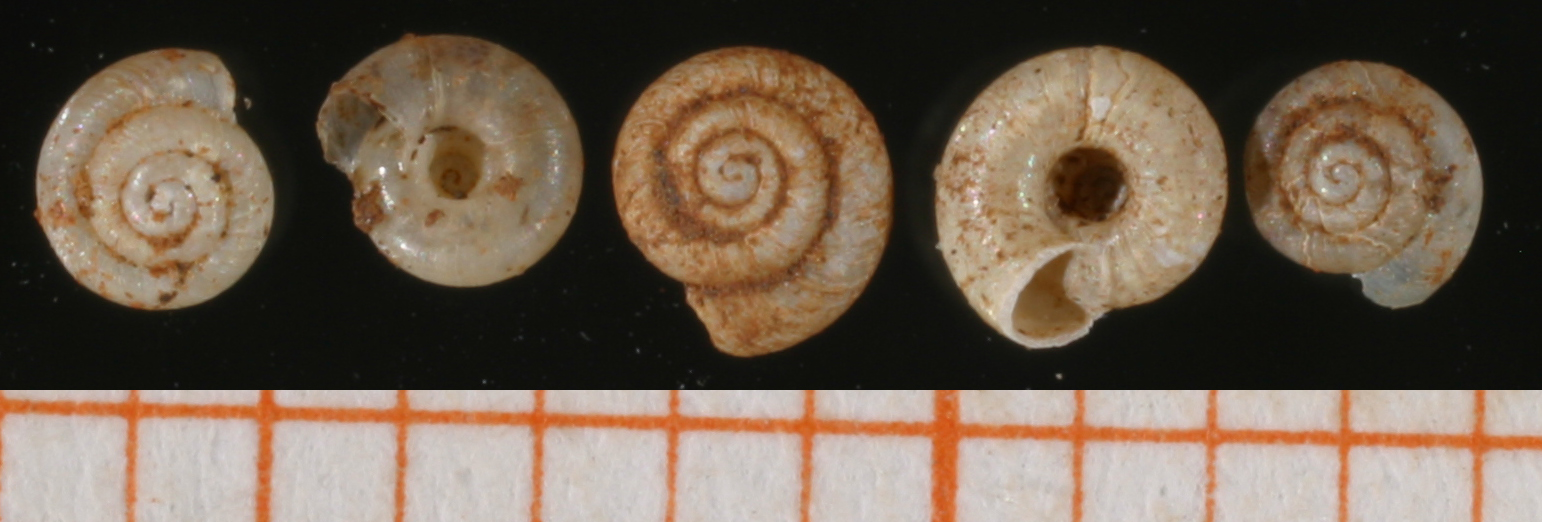
- Five shells of Hawaiia minuscula, scale bar in mm

Scientific classification
- Kingdom: Animalia
- Phylum: Mollusca
- Class: Gastropoda
- Order: Stylommatophora
- Suborder: Helicina
- Infraorder: Limacoidei
- Superfamily: Gastrodontoidea
- Family: Pristilomatidae; T. Cockerell, 1891

Synonyms
- Vitreinae H. B. Baker, 1930

= Pristilomatidae =

Family of gastropods

Pristilomatidae is a taxonomic family of air-breathing land snails, terrestrial gastropod molluscs in the superfamily Gastrodontoidea.

According to the 2005 taxonomy of the Gastropoda by Bouchet & Rocroi these snails belong to the "limacoid clade", and Vitreinae is a synonym for Pristilomatidae, although Vitreinae used to be a subfamily of Zonitidae. Family Pristilomatidae has no subfamilies (according to the taxonomy of the Gastropoda by Bouchet & Rocroi, 2005).

== Distribution ==
The distribution of Pristilomatidae includes the Nearctic, the western-Palearctic and eastern Palearctic, the Neotropical, Polynesia and Hawaii.

== Genera ==
Genera within the family Pristilomatidae include:

- Coreovitrea Riedel, 1967
- Gollumia Riedel, 1988
- Gyralina Andreae, 1902
- Hawaiia Gude, 1911
- Lindbergia Riedel, 1959
- Pristiloma Ancey, 1887 - type genus of the family Pristilomatidae
- Spinophallus Riedel, 1962
- Troglovitrea Negrea & Riedel, 1968
- Taurinellushka Balashov, 2014
- Vitrea Fitzinger, 1833 - There are three subgenera in the genus Vitrea:
  - subgenus Vitrea Fitzinger, 1833
  - subgenus Subrimatus A. J. Wagner, 1907
  - subgenus Crystallus R. T. Lowe, 1854
- Vermetum Wollaston, 1878

== Cladogram ==
The following cladogram shows the phylogenic relationships of this family to the other families within the limacoid clade:

- limacoid clade
  - Staffordioidea
    Staffordiidae
  - - - Dyakioidea
        Dyakiidae
      - Gastrodontoidea
        - Pristilomatidae
        - - Chronidae
          - - Euconulidae
            - Trochomorphidae
          - - Gastrodontidae
            - Oxychilidae
    - - Parmacelloidea
        - Trigonochlamydidae
        - Parmacellidae
        - Milacidae
      - - - Zonitoidea
            Zonitidae
          - Helicarionoidea
            - Helicarionidae
            - - Ariophantidae
              - Urocyclidae
        - Limacoidea
          - Vitrinidae
          - - Boettgerillidae
            - - Limacidae
              - Agriolimacidae
