= List of non-marine molluscs of Romania =

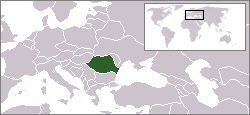
Location of Romania

The non-marine molluscs of Romania are a part of the molluscan fauna of Romania (wildlife of Romania). A number of species of non-marine mollusks are found in the wild in Romania.

== Freshwater gastropods ==
Neritidae

- Theodoxus danubialis (C. Pfeiffer, 1828)
- Theodoxus fluviatilis (Linnaeus, 1758)
- Theodoxus transversalis (C. Pfeiffer, 1828)

Viviparidae

- Viviparus acerosus (Bourguignat, 1862)
- Viviparus contectus (Millet, 1813)
- Viviparus sphaeridius Bourguignat 1880

Melanopsidae

- Fagotia esperi (Férussac, 1823)
- Fagotia daudebartii acicularis (Férussac, 1823)
- Holandriana holandrii (C. Pfeiffer, 1828)
- Microcolpia parreyssii (Philippi, 1847) - endemic to Romania, extinct since 2015

Bithyniidae

- Bithynia tentaculata (Linnaeus, 1758)
- Bithynia troschelii (Paasch, 1842)

Bythinellidae

- Bythinella blidariensis Glöer, 2013
- Bythinella calimanica Falniowski, Szarowska & Sirbu, 2009 - endemic to Romania
- Bythinella dacica Grossu, 1946 - endemic to Romania
- Bythinella falniowskii Glöer, 2013 - endemic to Romania
- Bythinella feheri Glöer, 2013 - endemic to Romania
- Bythinella georgievi Glöer, 2013 - endemic to Romania
- Bythinella gregoi Glöer & Erőss, 2015 - endemic to Romania
- Bythinella grossui Falniowski, Szarowska & Sirbu, 2009 - endemic to Romania
- Bythinella molcsanyi H. Wagner, 1941 - endemic to Romania
- Bythinella muranyii Glöer & Erőss, 2015 - endemic to Romania
- Bythinella radomani Falniowski, Szarowska & Sirbu, 2009 - endemic to Romania
- Bythinella sirbui Glöer, 2013 - endemic to Romania
- Bythinella szarowskae Glöer, 2013 - endemic to Romania
- Bythinella viseuiana Falniowski, Szarowska & Sirbu, 2009 - endemic to Romania

Hydrobiidae

- Grossuana codreanui (Grossu, 1946)

Lithoglyphidae

- Lithoglyphus apertus (Küster, 1852)
- Lithoglyphus naticoides (C. Pfeiffer, 1828)

Moitessieriidae

- Bythiospeum leruthi (C. R. Boettger, 1940)
- Bythiospeum transsylvanicum (Rotarides, 1943)
- Paladilhiopsis carpathica (L. Soós, 1940)

Tateidae

- Potamopyrgus antipodarum (J. E. Gray, 1843)

Valvatidae

- Valvata cristata O. F. Müller, 1774
- Valvata macrostoma (Mörch, 1864)
- Valvata piscinalis (O. F. Müller, 1774)

Acroloxidae

- Acroloxus lacustris (Linnaeus, 1758)

Lymnaeidae

- Galba truncatula (O. F. Müller, 1774)
- Stagnicola palustris (O. F. Müller, 1774)
- Stagnicola turricola (Held, 1836)
- Radix auricularia (Linnaeus, 1758)
- Radix ampla (Hartmann, 1821)
- Radix labiata (Rossmässler, 1835)
- Radix balthica (Linnaeus, 1758)
- Lymnaea stagnalis (Linnaeus, 1758)

Physidae

- Physa fontinalis (Linnaeus, 1758)
- Physella acuta (Draparnaud, 1805)

Planorbidae

- Planorbarius corneus (Linnaeus, 1758)
- Planorbis planorbis (Linnaeus, 1758)
- Anisus spirorbis (Linnaeus, 1758)
- Anisus calculiformis (Sandberger, 1874)
- Anisus vortex (Linnaeus, 1758)
- Anisus vorticulus (Troschel, 1834)
- Gyraulus albus (O. F. Müller, 1774)
- Gyraulus laevis (Alder, 1838)
- Gyraulus crista (Linnaeus, 1758)
- Hippeutis complanatus (Linnaeus, 1758)
- Segmentina nitida (O. F. Müller, 1774)
- Ferrissia wautieri (Mirolli, 1960)
- Ancylus fluviatilis O. F. Müller, 1774

== Land gastropods ==
Aciculidae

- Platyla banatica (Rossmässler, 1842)
- Platyla microspira (Pini, 1884)
- Platyla polita (Hartmann, 1840)

Pomatiidae

- Pomatias rivularis (Eichwald 1829)

Carychiidae

- Carychium tridentatum (Risso, 1826)

Succineidae

- Succinea putris (Linnaeus, 1758)
- Succinea oblonga (Draparnaud, 1801)

Cochlicopidae

- Cochlicopa lubrica (O. F. Müller, 1774)
- Cochlicopa lubricella (Porro, 1838)

Chondrinidae

- Chondrina arcadica clienta (Westerlund, 1883)
- Chondrina tatrica Ložek, 1948
- Granaria frumentum (Draparnaud 1801)

Orculidae

- Orcula jetschini M. von Kimakowicz 1883 - endemic to Romania
- Sphyradium doliolum (Bruguière, 1792)

Pyramidulidae

- Pyramidula pusilla (Vallot, 1801)

Truncatellinidae

- Columella edentula (Draparnaud, 1805)
- Truncatellina cylindrica (Férussac, 1807)

Valloniidae

- Acanthinula aculeata (O. F. Müller, 1774)
- Vallonia costata (O. F. Müller, 1774)

Vertiginidae

- Vertigo alpestris Alder, 1838
- Vertigo pusilla O. F. Müller, 1774

Enidae

- Ena montana (Draparnaud, 1801)

Clausiliidae

- Alinda biplicata (Montagu, 1803)
- Alinda fallax (Rossmässler, 1836)
- Alinda jugularis (Vest, 1859)
- Alinda stabilis (L. Pfeiffer, 1847)
- Alinda viridana (Rossmässler, 1836)
- Alopia alpina R. Kimakowicz, 1933 - endemic to Romania
- Alopia bielzii (L. Pfeiffer, 1849)
  - Alopia bielzii bielzii (L. Pfeiffer, 1849) - endemic to Romania
  - Alopia bielzii madensis (C. Fuss, 1855) - endemic to Romania
  - Alopia bielzii tenuis (E. A. Bielz, 1861) - endemic to Romania
- Alopia bogatensis (E. A. Bielz, 1856) - endemic to Romania
  - Alopia bogatensis angustata (E. A. Bielz, 1859) - endemic to Romania
  - Alopia bogatensis bogatensis (E. A. Bielz, 1856) - endemic to Romania
- Alopia canescens (Charpentier, 1852) - endemic to Romania
  - Alopia canescens ambigua M. Kimakowicz, 1883 - endemic to Romania
  - Alopia canescens caesarea (M. Kimakowicz, 1894) - endemic to Romania
  - Alopia canescens canescens (Charpentier, 1852) - endemic to Romania
  - Alopia canescens costata (E. A. Bielz, 1859) - endemic to Romania
  - Alopia canescens haueri (E. A. Bielz, 1859) - endemic to Romania
  - Alopia canescens nefaria (M. Kimakowicz, 1894) - endemic to Romania
  - Alopia canescens striaticollis (M. Kimakowicz, 1894) - endemic to Romania
- Alopia glauca (E. A. Bielz, 1853) - endemic to Romania
- Alopia glorifica (Charpentier, 1852) - endemic to Romania
  - Alopia glorifica deceptans Deli & Szekeres, 2011 - endemic to Romania
  - Alopia glorifica elegantissima H. Nordsieck, 1977 - endemic to Romania
  - Alopia glorifica glorifica (Charpentier, 1852) - endemic to Romania
  - Alopia glorifica intercedens (A. Schmidt, 1857) - endemic to Romania
  - Alopia glorifica magnifica R. Kimakowicz, 1962 - endemic to Romania
  - Alopia glorifica subita (M. Kimakowicz, 1894) - endemic to Romania
  - Alopia glorifica valachiensis O. Boettger, 1879 - endemic to Romania
  - Alopia glorifica vranceana Grossu, 1967 - endemic to Romania
- Alopia grossuana H. Nordsieck, 1977 - endemic to Romania
  - Alopia grossuana nemethi Deli & Szekeres, 2011 - endemic to Romania
  - Alopia grossuana grossuana H. Nordsieck, 1977 - endemic to Romania
- Alopia hirschfelderi Nordsieck, 2013 - endemic to Romania
- Alopia lischkeana (Charpentier, 1852) - endemic to Romania
  - Alopia lischkeana boettgeri M. Kimakowicz, 1883 - endemic to Romania
  - Alopia lischkeana cybaea (M. Kimakowicz, 1894) - endemic to Romania
  - Alopia lischkeana galbina R. Kimakowicz, 1943 - endemic to Romania
  - Alopia lischkeana lischkeana (Charpentier, 1852) - endemic to Romania
  - Alopia lischkeana livens (E. A. Bielz, 1853) - endemic to Romania
  - Alopia lischkeana sarkanyi Szekeres, 2007 - endemic to Romania
  - Alopia lischkeana violacea (M. Kimakowicz, 1894) - endemic to Romania
- Alopia livida (Menke, 1828) - endemic to Romania
  - Alopia livida deaniana A. H. Cooke, 1922 - endemic to Romania
  - Alopia livida julii A. J. Wagner, 1914 - endemic to Romania
  - Alopia livida livida (Menke, 1828) - endemic to Romania
  - Alopia livida straminicollis (Charpentier, 1852) - endemic to Romania
  - Alopia livida vargabandii Fehér & Szekeres, 2019 - endemic to Romania
- Alopia maciana Bădărău & Szekeres, 2001 - endemic to Romania
- Alopia mafteiana Grossu, 1967 - endemic to Romania
  - Alopia mafteiana mafteiana Grossu, 1967 - endemic to Romania
  - Alopia mafteiana valeriae Szekeres, 2007 - endemic to Romania
- Alopia mariae R. Kimakowicz, 1931 - endemic to Romania
  - Alopia mariae coronata R. Kimakowicz, 1943 - endemic to Romania
  - Alopia mariae hildegardae R. Kimakowicz, 1931 - endemic to Romania
  - Alopia mariae mariae R. Kimakowicz, 1931 - endemic to Romania
  - Alopia mariae soosi R. A. Brandt, 1961 - endemic to Romania
- Alopia meschendorferi (E. A. Bielz, 1858) - endemic to Romania
- Alopia monacha (M. Kimakowicz, 1894) - endemic to Romania
- Alopia nefasta (M. Kimakowicz, 1894) - endemic to Romania
  - Alopia nefasta ciucasiana Grossu, 1969 - endemic to Romania
  - Alopia nefasta helenae R. Kimakowicz, 1928 - endemic to Romania
  - Alopia nefasta mauritii R. Kimakowicz, 1928 - endemic to Romania
  - Alopia nefasta nefasta (M. Kimakowicz, 1894) - endemic to Romania
  - Alopia nefasta zagani Szekeres, 1969 - endemic to Romania
- Alopia nixa (M. Kimakowicz, 1894) - endemic to Romania
  - Alopia nixa fussi (M. Kimakowicz, 1894) - endemic to Romania
  - Alopia nixa nixa (M. Kimakowicz, 1894) - endemic to Romania
- Alopia plumbea (Rossmässler, 1839) - endemic to Romania
  - Alopia plumbea bellicosa (M. Kimakowicz, 1894) - endemic to Romania
  - Alopia plumbea plumbea (Rossmässler, 1839) - endemic to Romania
- Alopia pomatias (L. Pfeiffer, 1868) - endemic to Romania
  - Alopia pomatias albicostata (M. Kimakowicz, 1894) - endemic to Romania
  - Alopia pomatias pomatias (L. Pfeiffer, 1868) - endemic to Romania
- Alopia regalis (M. Bielz, 1851) - endemic to Romania
  - Alopia regalis deubeli (Clessin, 1890) - endemic to Romania
  - Alopia regalis doftanae H. Nordsieck, 1977 - endemic to Romania
  - Alopia regalis glabriuscula (Rossmässler, 1859) - endemic to Romania
  - Alopia regalis microstoma (M. Kimakowicz, 1883) - endemic to Romania
  - Alopia regalis mutabilis (M. Kimakowicz, 1894) - endemic to Romania
  - Alopia regalis nordsiecki Grossu & Tesio, 1973 - endemic to Romania
  - Alopia regalis petrensis H. Nordsieck, 1996 - endemic to Romania
  - Alopia regalis proclivis (M. Kimakowicz, 1894) - endemic to Romania
  - Alopia regalis regalis (M. Bielz, 1851) - endemic to Romania
  - Alopia regalis sabinae R. Kimakowicz, 1928 - endemic to Romania
  - Alopia regalis wagneri (M. Kimakowicz, 1894) - endemic to Romania
- Alopia subcosticollis (A. Schmidt, 1868) - endemic to Romania
- Alopia vicina (M. Kimakowicz, 1894) - endemic to Romania
  - Alopia vicina fortunata R. Kimakowicz, 1931 - endemic to Romania
  - Alopia vicina occulta R. Kimakowicz, 1931 - endemic to Romania
  - Alopia vicina tamasorum Szekeres, 2007 - endemic to Romania
  - Alopia vicina vicina (M. Kimakowicz, 1894) - endemic to Romania
- Balea perversa (Linnaeus, 1758)
- Clausilia cruciata Studer, 1820
- Clausilia dubia Draparnaud, 1805
- Clausilia pumila (C. Pfeiffer, 1828)
- Cochlodina cerata (Rossmässler, 1836)
- Cochlodina laminata (Montagu 1803)
- Cochlodina marisi (A. Schmidt, 1868)
- Cochlodina orthostoma (Menke, 1828)
- Graciliaria inserta (Porro, 1841)
- Herilla ziegleri dacica (L. Pfeiffer, 1848)
- Laciniaria plicata (Draparnaud 1801)
- Macedonica marginata marginata (Rossmässler, 1835)
- Macrogastra latestriata (Schmidt, 1857)
- Macrogastra plicatula (Draparnaud, 1801)
- Macrogastra tumida (Rossmässler, 1836)
- Ruthenica filograna (Rossmässler, 1836)
- Ruthenica gallinae (E. A. Bielz, 1861) - endemic to Romania
- Serrulina serrulata (L. Pfeiffer, 1847)
- Strigillaria cana (Held, 1836)
- Strigillaria rugicollis
  - Strigillaria rugicollis carissima (Rossmässler, 1839)
  - Strigillaria rugicollis grossui (H. Nordsieck, 1973)
  - Strigillaria rugicollis pagana (Rossmässler, 1842)
  - Strigillaria rugicollis rugicollis (Rossmässler, 1836)
- Strigillaria varnensis (L. Pfeiffer, 1848)
- Strigillaria vetusta (Rossmässler 1836)
- Vestia elata (Rossmässler, 1836)
- Vestia gulo (E. A. Bielz, 1859)
- Vestia turgida (Rossmässler, 1836)

Ferussaciidae

- Cecilioides acicula (O.F. Müller, 1774)

Discidae

- Discus ruderatus (Férussac, 1821)
- Discus rotundatus (O.F. Müller, 1774)
- Discus perspectivus (M. von Mühlfeldt, 1816)

Punctidae

- Punctum pygmaeum (Draparnaud, 1801)

Euconulidae

- Euconulus fulvus (O.F. Müller, 1774)

Gastrodontidae

- Aegopinella epipedostoma (Fagot, 1879)
- Aegopinella minor (Stabile, 1864)
- Aegopinella pura (Alder, 1830)
- Nesovitrea hammonis (Ström, 1765)
- Nesovitrea petronella (L. Pfeiffer, 1853)
- Zonitoides nitidus (O. F. Müller, 1774)

Pristilomatidae

- Troglovitrea argintarui Negrea & A. Riedel, 1968 - endemic to Romania
- Vitrea botterii (L. Pfeiffer, 1853)
- Vitrea contracta (Westerlund, 1870)
- Vitrea crystallina (O.F. Müller, 1774)
- Vitrea diaphana (Studer, 1820)
- Vitrea erjaveci (Brusina, 1870)
- Vitrea jetschini (M. von Kimakowicz, 1890) - endemic to Romania
- Vitrea subcarinata (Clessin 1877) - endemic to Romania
- Vitrea subrimata (Reinhardt, 1870)
- Vitrea szekeresi Deli & Subai, 2011 - endemic to Romania
- Vitrea transsylvanica (Clessin, 1877)

Oxychilidae

- Carpathica denticulata Grossu, 1969
- Carpathica calophana (Westerlund, 1881)
- Carpathica langi (L. Pfeiffer, 1846)
- Cellariopsis deubeli (A. J. Wagner, 1914)
- Cibania transsilvanica (E. A. Bielz, 1859)
- Daudebradia brevipes (Draparnaud, 1805)
- Daudebardia dacica Grossu, 1969
- Daudebardia parvula Grossu, 1969
- Daudebardia rufa (Draparnaud, 1805)
- Mediterranea depressa (Sterki, 1880)
- Mediterranea hydatinus (Rossmässler, 1838)
- Mediterranea inopinata (Uličný, 1887)
- Mediterranea montivaga (M. Kimakowicz, 1890)
- Morlina glabra striaria (Rossmässler, 1835)
- Oxychilus draparnaudi (H. Beck, 1837)
- Schistophallus oscari (M. Kimakowicz, 1883) - endemic to Romania

Boettgerillidae

- Boettgerilla pallens Simroth, 1912

Milacidae

- Milax gagates (Draparnaud, 1801)
- Tandonia cristata (Kaleniczenko, 1851)
- Tandonia kusceri (H. Wagner, 1931)
- Tandonia rustica (Millet, 1843)

Agriolimacidae

- Deroceras agreste (Linnaeus, 1758)
- Deroceras bureschi (Wagner, 1934)
- Deroceras laeve (O.F. Müller, 1774)
- Deroceras moldavicum (Grossu & Lupu, 1961)
- Deroceras occidentalis (Grossu & Lupu, 1966)
- Deroceras reticulatum (O.F. Müller, 1774)
- Deroceras rodnae Grossu & Lupu, 1965
- Deroceras sturanyi (Simroth, 1894)
- Deroceras turcicum (Simroth, 1894)
- Krynickillus urbanskii (Wiktor, 1971)

Limacidae

- Ambigolimax nyctelius (Bourguignat, 1861)
- Ambigolimax valentianus (Férussac, 1822)
- Bielzia coerulans (M. Bielz, 1851)
- Lehmannia horezia Grossu & Lupu, 1962
- Lehmannia jaroslaviae Grossu, 1967
- Lehmannia macroflagellata Grossu & Lupu, 1962
- Lehmannia marginata (O.F. Müller, 1774)
- Lehmannia medioflagellata Lupu, 1968
- Lehmannia vrancensis Lupu, 1973
- Limacus flavus (Linnaeus, 1758)
- Limacus maculatus (Kaleniczenko 1851)
- Limax cinereoniger Wolf, 1801
- Limax dobrogicus Grossu & Lupu, 1960
- Limax maximus Linnaeus, 1758
- Malacolimax tenellus (O.F. Müller, 1774)

Vitrinidae

- Eucobresia diaphana (Draparnaud, 1805)
- Eucobresia nivalis (Dummont & Mortillet, 1854)
- Hesselimax kotulae (Westerlund, 1883)
- Oligolimax annularis (Studer, 1820)
- Semilimacella bonellii reitterii (O. Boettger, 1880)
- Semilimax semilimax (Férussac, 1802)
- Vitrina pellucida (O.F. Müller, 1774)

Arionidae

- Arion brunneus Lehmann, 1862
- Arion circumscriptus Johnston, 1828
- Arion fasciatus (Nilsson, 1823)
- Arion hortensis (Férussac, 1819)
- Arion subfuscus (Draparnaud, 1805)
- Arion vulgaris Moquin-Tandon, 1855

Camaenidae

- Fruticicola fruticum (O. F. Müller, 1774)

Geomitridae

- Cernuella cisalpina (Rossmässler, 1837)
- Cernuella virgata (Da Costa, 1778)
- Cochlicella acuta (O.F. Müller, 1774)
- Helicopsis cereoflava (M. Bielz, 1851)
- Helicopsis filimargo (Krynicki, 1833)
- Helicopsis lunulata (Krynicki, 1833)
- Helicopsis striata (O. F. Müller, 1774)
- Xerolenta obvia (Menke, 1828)
- Xerolenta spiruloides (A. J. Wagner, 1916)
- Xeropicta derbentina (Krynicki, 1836)
- Xeropicta krynickii (Krynicki, 1833)

Helicidae

- Arianta aethyops (M. Bielz, 1851)
- Arianta arbustorum (Linnaeus, 1758)
- Arianta hessei (M. Kimakowicz, 1883) - endemic to Romania
- Campylaea planospira planospira (Lamarck, 1822)
- Cattania balcanica (L. Pfeiffer, 1853)
- Cattania trizona (Rossmässler, 1835)
- Caucasotachea vindobonensis (C. Pfeiffer, 1828)
- Cepaea hortensis (O. F. Müller, 1774)
- Cepaea nemoralis (Linnaeus, 1758)
- Drobacia banatica (Rossmässler, 1838)
- Eobania vermiculata (O. F. Müller, 1774)
- Faustina barcensis (M. Kimakowicz, 1890) - endemic to Romania
- Faustina faustina (Stabille, 1884)
- Faustina kiralikoeica (M. Kimakowicz, 1890) - endemic to Romania
- Faustina rossmaessleri (L. Pfeiffer, 1842)
- Helix albescens Rossmaessler, 1839
- Helix lucorum Linnaeus, 1758
- Helix lutescens Rossmässler, 1837
- Helix pomatia Linnaeus, 1758
- Helix thessalica O. Boettger, 1886
- Isognomostoma isognomostomos (Schröter, 1784)

Helicodontidae

- Lindholmiola corcyrensis (Rossmässler, 1838)
- Soosia diodonta (A. Férussac, 1832)

Hygromiidae

- Edentiella bielzi (E. A. Bielz, 1860)
- Edentiella edentula (Draparnaud, 1805)
- Euomphalia mediata (Westerlund, 1888)
- Euomphalia strigella (Draparnaud, 1801)
- Lozekia deubeli (M. Kimakowicz, 1890) - endemic to Romania
- Lozekia transsylvanica (Westerlund, 1876) - endemic to Romania
- Monacha cantiana (Montagu, 1803)
- Monacha cartusiana (O.F. Müller, 1774)
- Monachoides bacescui Grossu, 1979 - endemic to Romania
- Monachoides incarnatus (O.F. Müller, 1774)
- Monachoides vicinus (Rossmässler, 1842)
- Perforatella bidentata (Gmelin, 1791)
- Perforatella dibothrion (E. A. Bielz, 1860) - endemic to Romania
- Petasina unidentata (Draparnaud, 1805)
- Plicuteria lubomirskii (Ślósarski, 1881)
- Pseudotrichia rubiginosa (Rossmässler, 1838)
- Trochulus hispidus (Linnaeus, 1758)
- Trochulus sericeus (Draparnaud, 1801)
- Urticicola umbrosus (C. Pfeiffer, 1828)
- Xerocampylaea zelebori (L. Pfeiffer, 1853)

== Freshwater bivalves ==
Unionidae

- Unio pictorum (Linnaeus, 1758)
- Unio tumidus Philipsson, 1788
- Unio crassus Lamarck, 1819
- Anodonta cygnea (Linnaeus, 1758)
- Anodonta anatina (Linnaeus, 1758)
- Sinanodonta woodiana (Lea, 1834)
- Pseudanodonta complanata (Rossmässler, 1835)

Corbiculidae

- Corbicula fluminea (O. F. Müller, 1774)

Sphaeriidae

- Sphaerium corneum (Linnaeus, 1758)
- Sphaerium rivicola (Lamarck, 1818)
- Musculium lacustre (O. F. Müller, 1774)
- Pisidium amnicum (O. F. Müller, 1774)
- Pisidium casertanum (Poli, 1791)
- Pisidium personatum Malm, 1855
- Pisidium henslowanum (Sheppard, 1823)
- Pisidium milium Held, 1836
- Pisidium subtruncatum Malm, 1855
- Pisidium moitessierianum (Paladilhe, 1866)

Dreissenidae

- Dreissena polymorpha (Pallas, 1771)
- Dreissena bugensis (Andrusov, 1897)

== See also ==
Lists of molluscs of surrounding countries:

- List of non-marine molluscs of Bulgaria
- List of non-marine molluscs of Hungary
- List of non-marine molluscs of Moldova
- List of non-marine molluscs of Serbia
- List of non-marine molluscs of Ukraine
