= Alinda elegantissima =

Conservation status
- Near Threatened (IUCN 3.1)

Scientific classification
- Kingdom: Animalia
- Phylum: Mollusca
- Class: Gastropoda
- Order: Stylommatophora
- Family: Clausiliidae
- Genus: Alinda
- Species: A. elegantissima

Binomial name
- Alinda elegantissima A. J. Wagner, 1914

Subspecies
- Alinda elegantissima elegantissima A. J. Wagner, 1914; Alinda elegantissima pirotana H. Nordsieck, 2008

Synonyms
- Alinda (Alinda) biplicata elegantissima A. J. Wagner, 1914; Alinda (Alinda) elegantissima A. J. Wagner, 1914

Species of gastropod

Alinda elegantissima is a species of air-breathing land snail, a terrestrial pulmonate gastropod mollusk in the family Clausiliidae, the door snails.

== Distribution ==
This species occurs in Serbia, with two specific sites in the Nišava valley of Eastern Serbia. It is noted as absent from neighboring Bulgaria.

== Relationships ==
Alinda elegantissima is placed within the Alinda biplicata species group as sister to A. atanasovi, A. biplicata, A. vratzatica, and A. wagneri. Formerly both A. atanasovi and A. elegantissima had been treated as subspecies of A. biplicata, and while the genitalia of both are closest morphologically to Alinda, the shell characters are closer to those of some Laciniaria species.

== Size ==
Alinda elegantissima shells range between 10–15 mm (2/5–3/5 in) tall for the whole species, with a lunellar structure placed closer towards the shell mouth then seen in and the peristome is missing internally placed pliculae or palatial walls.

The shells of A. e. elegantissima range between 10–13.5 mm (2/5–13/25 in) in height. They also typically have more than 18 ribs per 2 mm (2/25 in) long section of penultimate whorl and are narrower than A. e. pirotana shells. In A. e. pirotana shells are usually wider then A. e. elegantissima and a bit shorter on average, ranging between 10–13.5 mm (2/5–13/25 in) tall. The lunellar is closer to the shell mouth and there are only about 18 ribs per 2 mm (2/25 in) penultimate whorl section.

== Etymology ==
The subspecies name of Alinda elegantissima pirotana was coined in reference to the type locality for the subspecies, Pirot fort in Pirot, Serbia.
