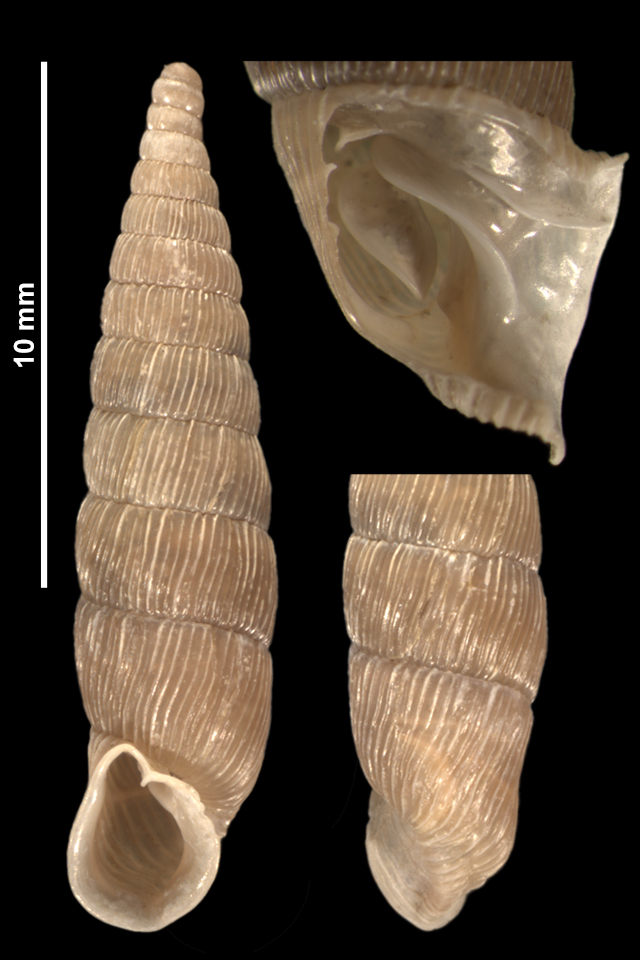
- shell of Alinda biplicata (specimen at MNHN, Paris)

Scientific classification
- Kingdom: Animalia
- Phylum: Mollusca
- Class: Gastropoda
- Order: Stylommatophora
- Superfamily: Clausilioidea
- Family: Clausiliidae
- Subfamily: Baleinae
- Genus: Alinda; H. Adams & A. Adams, 1855

Species
- See text

Synonyms
- Alinda (Alinda) H. Adams & A. Adams, 1855· alternate representation; Alinda (Pseudalinda) O. Boettger, 1877 alternate representation; Balea (Alinda) H. Adams & A. Adams, 1855; Balea (Pseudalinda) O. Boettger, 1877; Banatica O. Boettger, 1877; Clausilia (Alinda) H. Adams & A. Adams, 1855 (original rank); Clausilia (Cusmicia) junior subjective synonym; Clausilia (Iphigenia) Gray, 1840 superseded rank; Clausilia (Kuzmicia) Brusina, 1870 (junior synonym); Clausilia (Pseudalinda) O. Boettger, 1877; Iphigena [sic] (Invalid: junior homonym of Iphigenia Schumacher, 1817; Alinda is a replacement name; incorrect subsequent spelling); Iphigenia Gray, 1840; Kuzmicia Brusina, 1870; Laciniaria (Alinda) H. Adams & A. Adams, 1855 (superseded generic combination); Laciniaria (Pseudalinda) O. Boettger, 1877; Plicaphora W. Hartmann, 1841; Pseudalinda O. Boettger, 1877; Pseudalinda (Pseudalinda) O. Boettger, 1877; Pseudocerva Schaufuss, 1869

= Alinda (gastropod) =

Subgenus of gastropods

Alinda is a genus of small air-breathing land snails, terrestrial pulmonate gastropod mollusks in the family Clausiliidae, the door snails.

The name Alinda Adams & Adams, 1855 cannot be used because the older name Plicaphora Hartmann, 1841 has as type * A junior synonym of Alinda's type species Turbo biplicatus Montagu, 1803.

== Species ==
Species in this genus include:

- Alinda atanasovi (Urbański, 1964)
- Alinda biplicata (Montagu, 1803)
- Alinda elegantissima A. J. Wagner, 1914
- Alinda fallax (Rossmässler, 1836)
- Alinda jugularis (Vest, 1859)
- Alinda golesnicensis A. J. Wagner, 1914
- Alinda nordsiecki (Dedov & Neubert, 2002)
- Alinda pancici (Pavlović, 1912)
- Alinda serbica (Möllendorff, 1873)
- Alinda stabilis (L. Pfeiffer, 1847)
- Alinda viridana (Rossmässler, 1836)
- Alinda vratzatica (I. M. Likharev, 1972)
- Alinda wagneri (A. J. Wagner, 1911)

Synonyms

- Alinda plicata (Draparnaud, 1801): synonym of Laciniaria plicata (Draparnaud, 1801) (unaccepted > superseded combination)
- Alinda serbica (Möllendorff, 1873): synonym of Alinda golesnicensis serbiana (Welter-Schultes, 2012) (based on preoccupied original name)
- Alinda thessalonica (Rossmässler, 1839): synonym of Strigillaria thessalonica (Rossmässler, 1839): synonym of Bulgarica thessalonica (Rossmässler, 1839) (superseded combination)
