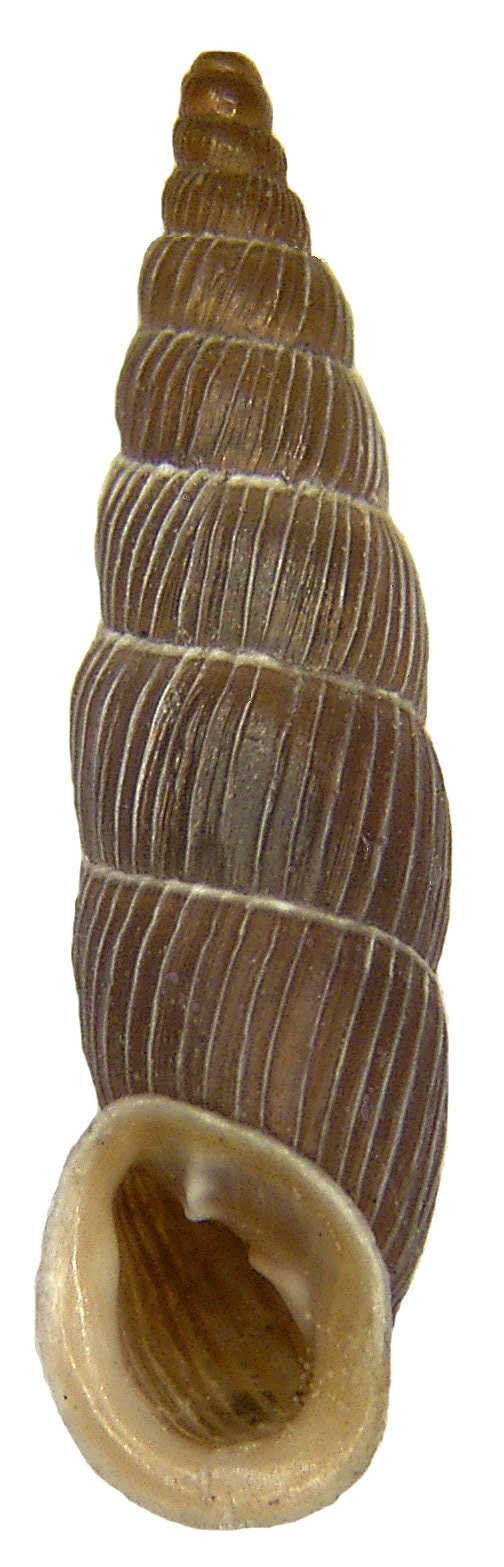
- Alopia glauca

Scientific classification
- Kingdom: Animalia
- Phylum: Mollusca
- Class: Gastropoda
- Order: Stylommatophora
- Family: Clausiliidae
- Tribe: Alopiini
- Genus: Alopia; H.Adams & A.Adams, 1855

Type species
- Clausilia bielzii L. Pfeiffer, 1849
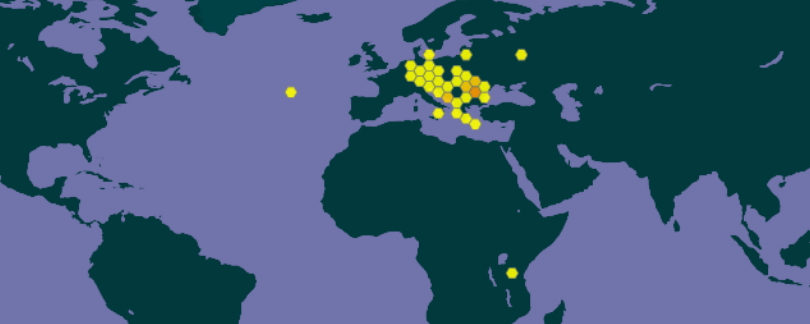

Synonyms
- Alopia (Alopia) H. Adams & A. Adams, 1855 alternative representation; Alopia (Kimakowiczia) Szekeres, 1969 alternative representation; Alopia (Nixa) Szekeres, 1976 (junior synonym); Balea (Baleoclausilia) E. A. Bielz, 1861 junior subjective synonym; Clausilia (Alopia) H. Adams & A. Adams, 1855 (original rank); Clausilia (Eualopia) Westerlund, 1884 junior subjective synonym; Clausilia (Ithyption) Dean, 1918; Eualopia Westerlund, 1884; Transsilvanica Westerlund, 1890 ·

= Alopia =

Genus of land snails

Alopia is a genus of gastropods belonging to subfamily Alopiinae of the family Clausiliidae.

== Description ==
(Original description) The dextral or sinistral shell is relatively thin, with a dull, slightly plicate surface. There is no lunule, and the palatal plicae are numerous. The spiral lamella is disjointed, and the body whorl is rounded at the base. The peristome is continuous and slightly detached.

== Distribution ==
The species of this genus are found in Europe.

Species:

- Alopia alpina R.Kimakowicz, 1933
- Alopia bielzii (L.Pfeiffer, 1849)
- Alopia bogatensis (E.A.Bielz, 1856)
- Alopia canescens (Charpentier, 1852)
- Alopia glauca (E.A.Bielz, 1853)
- Alopia glorifica (Charpentier, 1852)
- Alopia grossuana H.Nordsieck, 1977
- Alopia hirschfelderi H.Nordsieck, 2013
- Alopia lischkeana (Charpentier, 1852)
- Alopia livida (Menke, 1828)
- Alopia maciana Bădărău & Szekeres, 2001
- Alopia mafteiana Grossu, 1967
- Alopia mariae R.Kimakowicz, 1931
- Alopia meschendorferi (E.A.Bielz, 1858)
- Alopia monacha (M.Kimakowicz, 1894)
- Alopia nefasta (M.Kimakowicz, 1894)
- Alopia nixa (M.Kimakowicz, 1894)
- Alopia plumbea (Rossmässler, 1839)
- Alopia pomatias (L.Pfeiffer, 1868)
- Alopia regalis (M.Bielz, 1851)
- Alopia subcosticollis (A.Schmidt, 1868)
- Alopia valachiensis pretiosa Szekeres, 1969 (uncertain > unassessed)
- Alopia vicina (M.Kimakowicz, 1894)

== Synonyms ==
- Alopia balcanica Pavlović, 1912: synonym of Alinda biplicata subsp. balcanica (Pavlović, 1912)
- Alopia ciucasiana Grossu, 1969: synonym of Alopia nefasta ciucasiana Grossu, 1969 (superseded rank, .)
- Alopia cyclostoma (E. A. Bielz, 1858): synonym of Alopia pomatias (L. Pfeiffer, 1868) (junior homonym)
- Alopia deaniana A. H. Cooke, 1922: synonym of Alopia livida deaniana A. H. Cooke, 1922 (original rank)
- Alopia fortunata R. Kimakowicz, 1931: synonym of Alopia vicina fortunata R. Kimakowicz, 1931 (superseded rank)
- Alopia fussi (M. Kimakowicz, 1894): synonym of Alopia nixa fussi (M. Kimakowicz, 1894)
- Alopia hildegardae R. Kimakowicz, 1931: synonym of Alopia mariae hildegardae R. Kimakowicz, 1931 (superseded rank)
- Alopia magnifica R. Kimakowicz, 1962: synonym of Alopia glorifica magnifica R. Kimakowicz, 1962 (unaccepted > superseded rank)
- Alopia nordsiecki Grossu & Tesio, 1973: synonym of Alopia (Alopia) regalis nordsiecki Grossu & Tesio, 1973 represented as Alopia regalis nordsiecki Grossu & Tesio, 1973 (original rank)
- Alopia occulta R. Kimakowicz, 1931: synonym of Alopia vicina occulta R. Kimakowicz, 1931 (superseded rank)
- Alopia petrensis H. Nordsieck, 1996: synonym of Alopia regalis petrensis H. Nordsieck, 1996 (original rank)
- Alopia soosiana Agócsy & Pócs, 1961: synonym of Alopia pomatias (L. Pfeiffer, 1868) (junior subjective synonym, original name)
- Alopia straminicollis (Charpentier, 1852): synonym of Alopia livida straminicollis (Charpentier, 1852)
- Alopia valachiensis (O. Boettger, 1879): synonym of Alopia (Alopia) glorifica valachiensis (O. Boettger, 1879) represented as Alopia glorifica valachiensis (O. Boettger, 1879) (unaccepted rank)
- Alopia vranceana Grossu, 1967: synonym of Alopia (Alopia) glorifica vranceana Grossu, 1967 represented as Alopia glorifica vranceana Grossu, 1967 (original combination)
