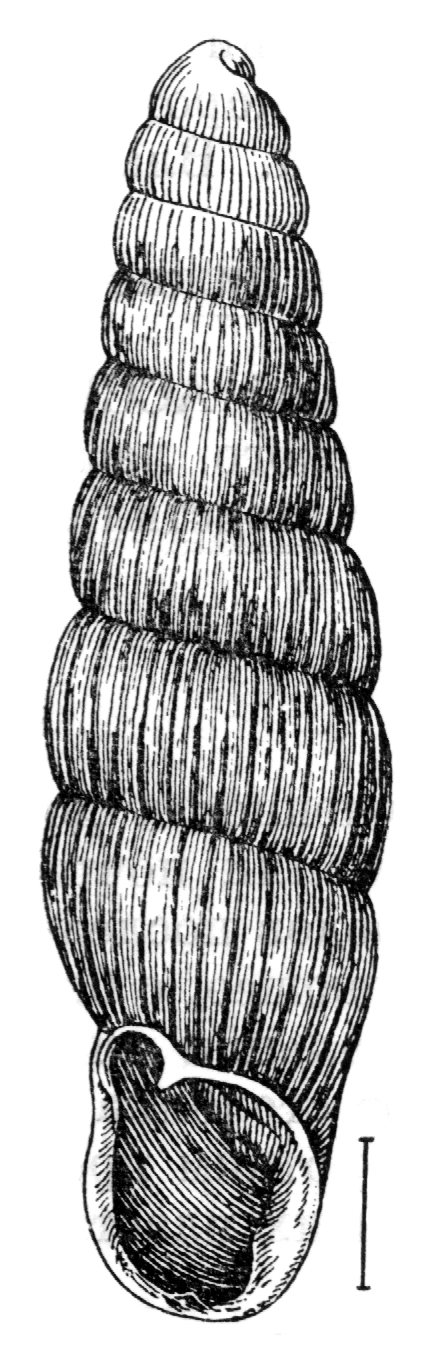
- An engraving of a shell of Ruthenica filograna

Scientific classification
- Kingdom: Animalia
- Phylum: Mollusca
- Class: Gastropoda
- Order: Stylommatophora
- Infraorder: Clausilioidei
- Superfamily: Clausilioidea
- Family: Clausiliidae
- Genus: Ruthenica; Lindholm, 1924

Synonyms
- Graciliaria (Ruthenica) Lindholm, 1924 (original rank)

= Ruthenica =

Genus of gastropods

Ruthenica is a genus of air-breathing land snail, a terrestrial pulmonate gastropod mollusk in the subfamily Clausiliinae of the family Clausiliidae, the door snails, all of which have a clausilium.

== Species ==
Species in the genus Ruthenica include:

- Ruthenica filograna (Rossmässler, 1836)
- Ruthenica gallinae (E. A. Bielz, 1861)
