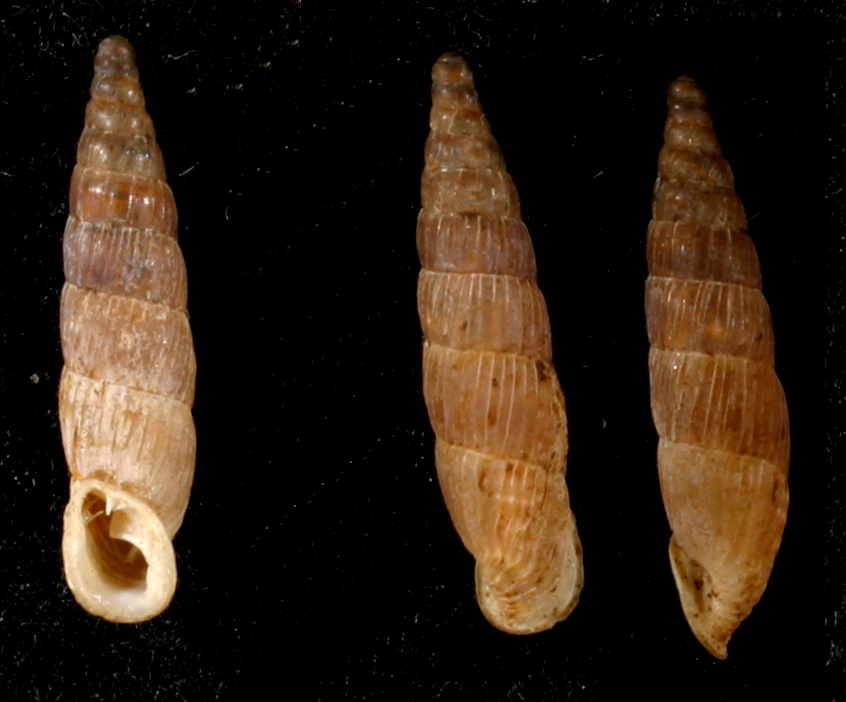
- Shell of Alopia bogatensis

Conservation status
- Least Concern (IUCN 3.1)

Scientific classification
- Domain: Eukaryota
- Kingdom: Animalia
- Phylum: Mollusca
- Class: Gastropoda
- Order: Stylommatophora
- Family: Clausiliidae
- Genus: Alopia
- Species: A. bogatensis

Binomial name
- Alopia bogatensis (E. A. Bielz, 1856)
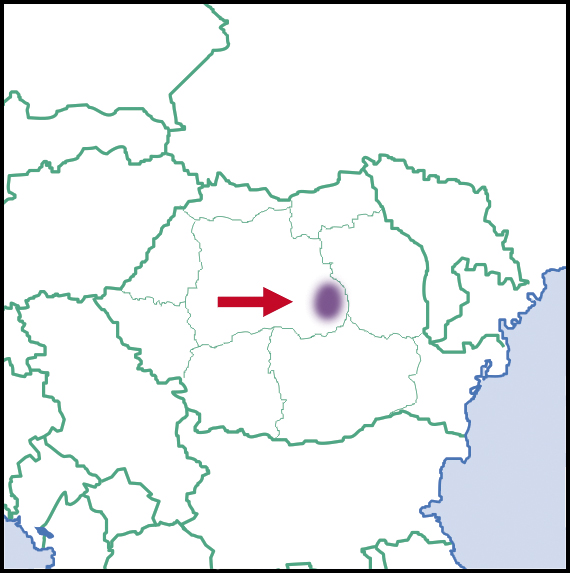

Synonyms
- Alopia (Alopia) bogatensis (E. A. Bielz, 1856) alternative representation; Clausilia bogatensis E. A. Bielz, 1856 superseded combination (original name)

= Alopia bogatensis =

Species of gastropod

Alopia bogatensis is a species of small, tropical, air-breathing land snail, a terrestrial pulmonate gastropod mollusk in the family Clausiliidae.

Subspecies/

- Alopia bogatensis angustata (E. A. Bielz, 1859)
- Alopia bogatensis bogatensis (E. A. Bielz, 1856)
- Alopia bogatensis laevior H. Nordsieck, 2024

== Description ==
The length of the shell varies between 13 mm (0.51 in) and 19 mm (0.75 in), its diameter between 3.2 mm (0.13 in) and 4.2 mm (0.17 in).

(Original description in German) The sinistral shell shows arched grooves and has a ventricose spindle shape. The shell is thin, translucent, and exhibits an oily sheen, with a bluish tint when alive. It has 10 convex whorls adorned with fairly widely spaced, irregular ribs that become only slightly weaker towards the lower part of the whorl. The neck near the aperture is whitish, featuring coarser, more wavy wrinkles, compressed into a ribbed bulge by a slight indentation below. The aperture is irregularly elongated and bean-shaped, extending into an angular point at the columella. The outer lip is continuous, detached, reflexed, and white, without a distinct lip edge. The upper lamella is short and does not extend to the aperture lip. The lower lamella is fairly prominent, projecting in a curved arc, compressed, and slightly bent at the edge. There are four palatal folds: the uppermost is very long, standing 1/2 mm away from the suture and projecting significantly forward; the second to fourth folds diverge sharply from the uppermost, are smaller, with the third being dot-shaped and the fourth also projecting. The columellar fold reaches the aperture lip, making the aperture angular. The lunate fold is absent. The spiral lamella is broad and recedes far behind the upper lamella. The closing nodule is notched into two lobes, with the right lobe being longer.

== Distribution ==
This species occurs in Romania.
