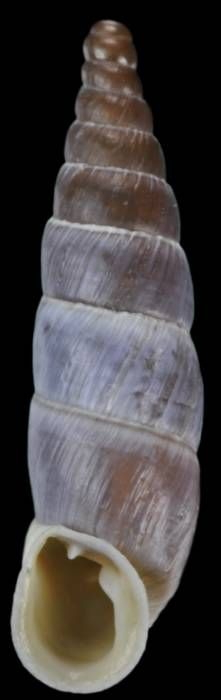
- Shell of Alopia nixa (specimen at Collection Mollusca SMF - Senckenberg)

Conservation status
- Least Concern (IUCN 3.1)

Scientific classification
- Domain: Eukaryota
- Kingdom: Animalia
- Phylum: Mollusca
- Class: Gastropoda
- Order: Stylommatophora
- Family: Clausiliidae
- Genus: Alopia
- Species: A. nixa

Binomial name
- Alopia nixa (M. Kimakowicz, 1894)
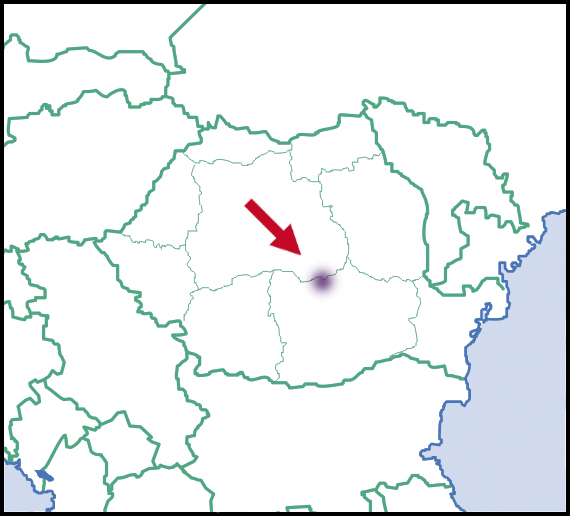

Synonyms
- Alopia (Alopia) nixa (M. Kimakowicz, 1894) · alternative representation; Clausilia (Alopia) canescens nixa M. Kimakowicz, 1894; Clausilia (Alopia) nixa M. Kimakowicz, 1894 superseded combination (basionym)

= Alopia nixa =

Species of gastropod

Alopia nixa is a species of small, tropical, air-breathing land snail, a terrestrial pulmonate gastropod mollusk in the family Clausiliidae.

Subspecies

- Alopia nixa fussi (M. Kimakowicz, 1894)
- Alopia nixa nixa (M. Kimakowicz, 1894)

== Description ==
(Description originally in German of Clausilia (Alopia) nixa) The length of the shell varies between 12 mm and 15 mm, its diameter between 3.5 mm and 4.2 mm.

The shell is either dextral or sinistral. it has a swollen spindle shape. It is slightly fragile and barely translucent, featuring a faint to matte gloss. The base color varies from reddish-brown to brown-violet, with a well-developed opaque surface layer that appears as dull light blue or blue-white on the middle whorls, occasionally allowing the base color to show through in spots. The upper whorls are glossier, ranging from reddish-brown to chestnut-brown, and the last whorl near the aperture displays a yellowish-white band. A fine whitish suture thread is often faint or barely visible.

The sculpture on the middle whorls consists of weak to indistinct growth lines, becoming more pronounced at the suture of the upper whorls, giving it a faintly crenulated appearance. On the body whorl, especially near the aperture, these lines transition into dense, fairly strong, yet slightly uneven ribbed streaks. The slightly convex spire consists of 8.5 flatly rounded whorls, separated by a shallow suture. The body whorl rises very little or not at all at the front and is somewhat compressed into a weak basal keel around the umbilical slit.

The pear-shaped aperture recedes slightly at the bottom, with a fairly wide, angular sinulus that is barely raised. The yellowish-brown lip is continuous, briefly detached or applied, and generally well-spread. The interior is subtly and lightly lipped, with a faint callus above the sinulus. The clausilium is composed of only the upper and lower lamella, which, while short, are already fairly well-developed.

== Distribution ==
This species occurs in Romania.
