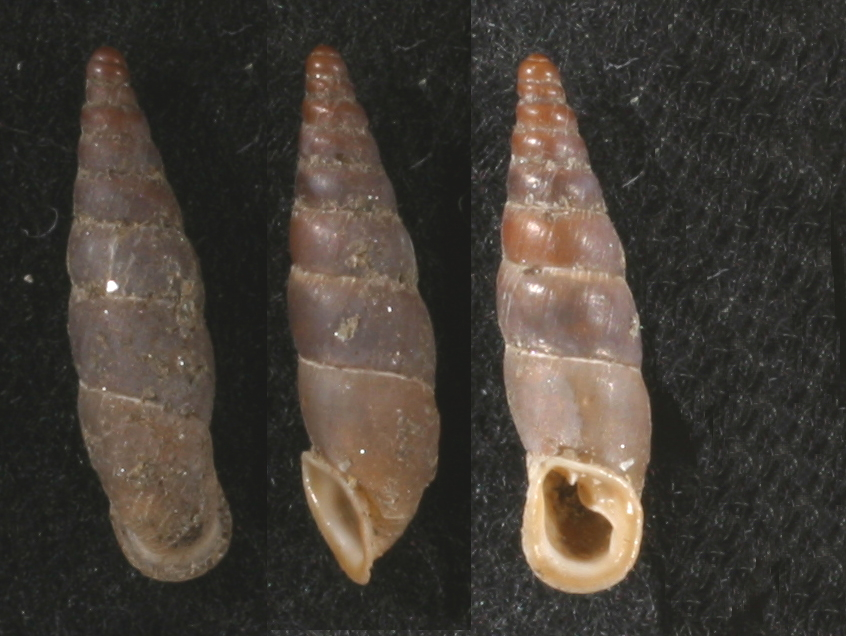
- Shell of Alopia subcosticollis

Conservation status
- Near Threatened (IUCN 3.1)

Scientific classification
- Kingdom: Animalia
- Phylum: Mollusca
- Class: Gastropoda
- Order: Stylommatophora
- Family: Clausiliidae
- Genus: Alopia
- Species: A. subcosticollis

Binomial name
- Alopia subcosticollis (A. Schmidt, 1868)
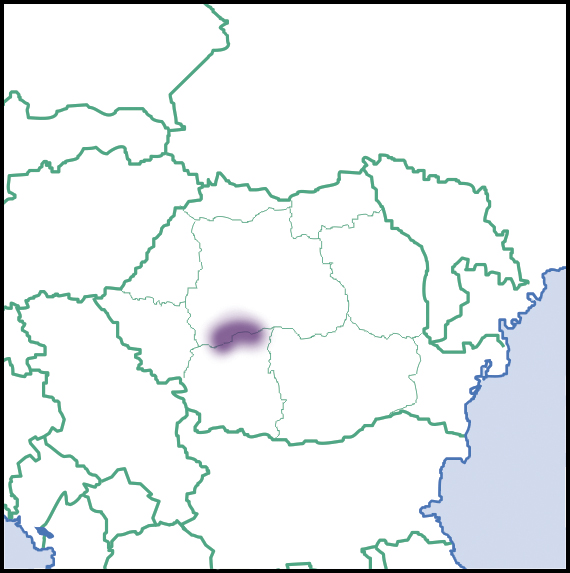

Synonyms
- Alopia (Alopia) subcosticollis (A. Schmidt, 1868) alternative representation; Clausilia straminicollis var. subcosticollis A. Schmidt, 1868 unaccepted (original name)

= Alopia subcosticollis =

Species of gastropod

Alopia subcosticollis is a species of small, tropical, air-breathing land snail, a terrestrial pulmonate gastropod mollusk in the family Clausiliidae.

Subspecies

- † Alopia subcosticollis majorosi Szekeres, 2007
- Alopia subcosticollis subcosticollis (A. Schmidt, 1868
- Alopia subcosticollis tamasorum Szekeres, 2007: synonym of Alopia vicina tamasorum Szekeres, 2007 (superseded combination, basionym)
- Alopia subcosticollis vicina (M. Kimakowicz, 1894): synonym of Alopia vicina vicina (M. Kimakowicz, 1894)(superseded combination)

== Description ==
The length of the shell varies between 14 mm and 19 mm its diameter between 3.7 mm and 4.5 mm.

The sinistral shell is reddish-violet in color. It is often covered by milky surface layers and is nearly smooth. The suture is white, and there are 9 to 11 relatively convex whorls. The cervix features strong, typically short, white corrugated ribs extending from the keel region. The columellar fold is prominent and curved, with three palatal folds.

== Distribution ==
This species occurs in Romania.
