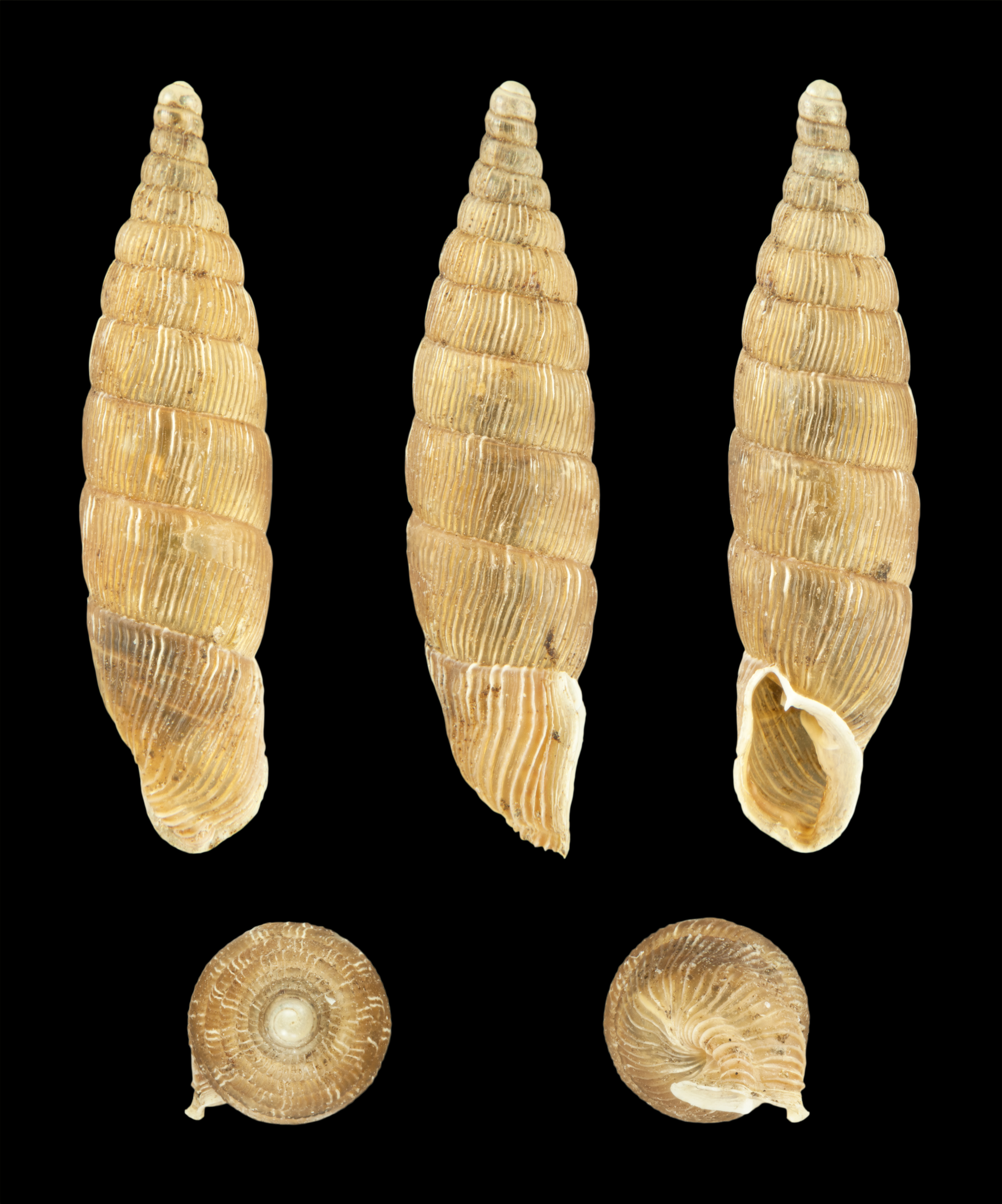
- Shell of Alinda biplicata

Conservation status
- Least Concern (IUCN 3.1)

Scientific classification
- Kingdom: Animalia
- Phylum: Mollusca
- Class: Gastropoda
- Order: Stylommatophora
- Family: Clausiliidae
- Genus: Alinda
- Species: A. biplicata

Binomial name
- Alinda biplicata (Montagu, 1803)

Synonyms
- Turbo biplicata Montagu, 1803; Balea biplicata (Montagu, 1803); Laciniaria biplicata

= Alinda biplicata =

Species of gastropod

Alinda biplicata, also known as Balea biplicata, common name the two-lipped door snail or Thames door snail, is a species of air-breathing land snail, a terrestrial pulmonate gastropod mollusk in the family Clausiliidae, the door snails, all of which have a clausilium.

== Distribution ==
This species is known to occur in several European countries and islands, including:

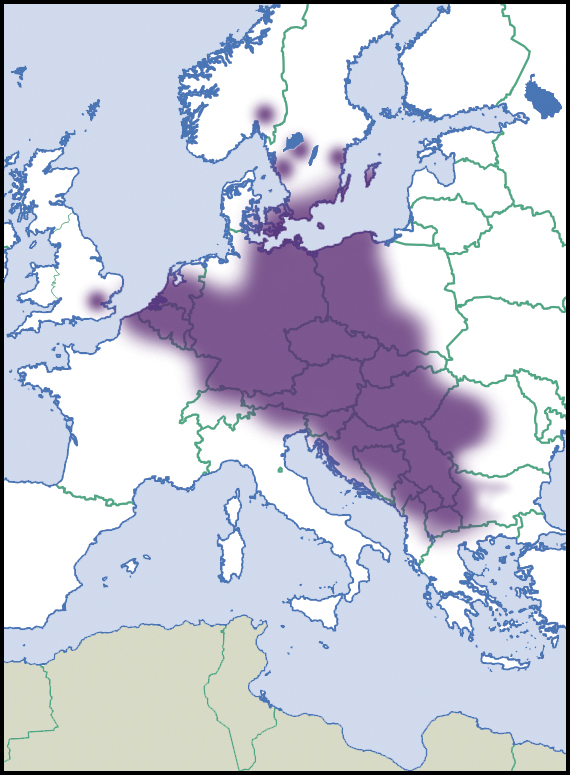
Distribution of Alinda biplicata

- Czech Republic
- Poland
- Slovakia
- Hungary
- Romania
- Bulgaria
- Greece
- Slovenia
- Croatia
- Serbia
- Switzerland
- Austria
- Germany
- France
- Belgium
- Netherlands
- Denmark
- Sweden
- Great Britain

This species is rare in Great Britain. In England, it is found mainly in the London area, almost exclusively along the River Thames, and is particularly preserved at Isleworth Ait. There is also a colony at Purfleet in Essex.

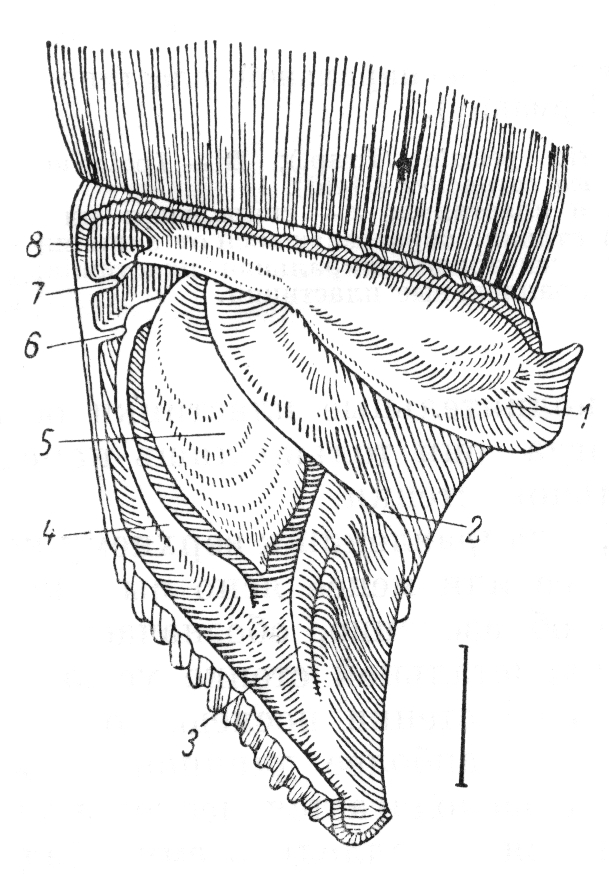
The internal shell anatomy of the body whorl of Alinda biplicata 1 - Lamella superior 2 - Lamella inferior 3 - Lamella subcolumellaris 4 - Lunella 5 - Clausilium 6 - Plica medialis 7 - Plica principalis 8 - Lamella spiralis

== Description ==
Like all species in this family, this snail has a clausilium. This spoon-shaped "door" is supported by, and slides in, a series of internal shell folds, see the image below.

The weight of the adult live snail is 149±6 mg.
