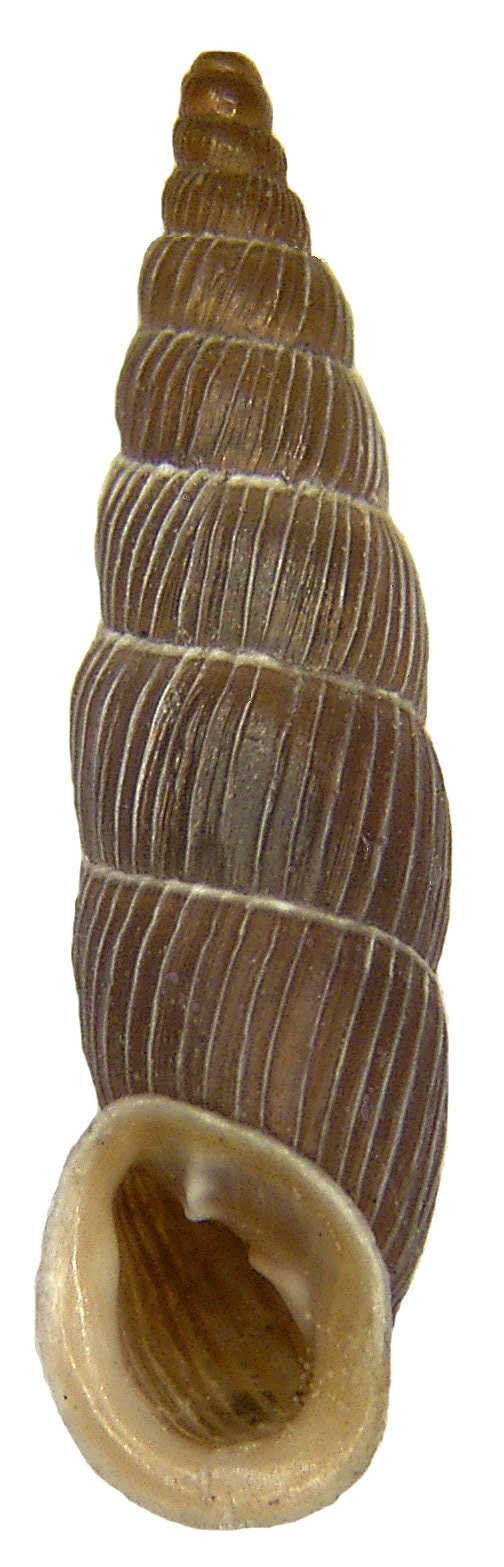
- Shell of Alopia glauca

Conservation status
- Least Concern (IUCN 3.1)

Scientific classification
- Kingdom: Animalia
- Phylum: Mollusca
- Class: Gastropoda
- Order: Stylommatophora
- Family: Clausiliidae
- Genus: Alopia
- Species: A. glauca

Binomial name
- Alopia glauca (E. A. Bielz, 1853)
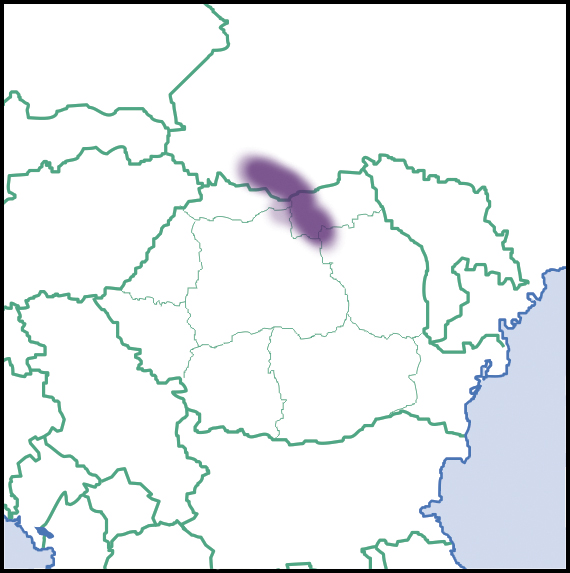

Synonyms
- Alopia (Kimakowiczia) glauca (E. A. Bielz, 1853) alternative representation; Balea glauca E. A. Bielz, 1853 (original combination); Clausilia (Alopia) glauca (E. A. Bielz, 1853) superseded combination; Clausilia (Alopia) glauca var. costata M. Kimakowicz, 1883 junior subjective synonym; Clausilia latens L. Pfeiffer, 1853 (junior synonym)

= Alopia glauca =

Species of gastropod

Alopia glauca is a species of small, tropical, air-breathing land snail, a terrestrial pulmonate gastropod mollusk in the family Clausiliidae.

== Description ==
The length of the shell varies between 11 mm and 18 mm, its diameter between 3.6 mm and 4.7 mm.

(original description in German) Animal: the upper surface is black-gray, densely covered with elongated granules that converge into five longitudinal lines along the neck; the sole is blue-gray.

Shell: The shell is sinistral and shows a wide umbilical slit. It is spindle-shaped and slightly swollen, featuring raised, irregular ribs that evolve into densely spaced, regular longitudinal striae. The surface is matte-glossy, violet in color, with a reddish apex, and when fresh, covered with a bluish bloom. The shell has 10 to 10.5 convex whorls, marked by a deep suture. The suture line and the densely wrinkled, prominently swollen neck are white. The aperture is pear-shaped. The lip is continuous, slightly detached, strongly reflexed, and lipped, with the lip being brownish-white and the palate yellow-brown. The lamellae are short and receding.

== Distribution ==
This species occurs in Romania.
