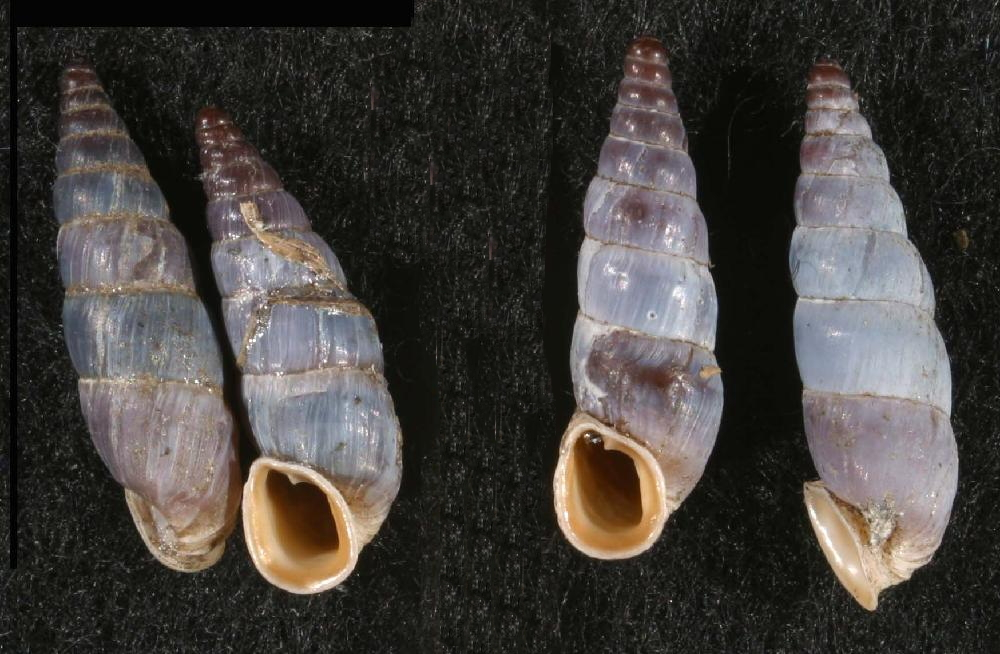
- Shell of Alopia canescens

Conservation status
- Least Concern (IUCN 3.1)

Scientific classification
- Kingdom: Animalia
- Phylum: Mollusca
- Class: Gastropoda
- Order: Stylommatophora
- Family: Clausiliidae
- Genus: Alopia
- Species: A. canescens

Binomial name
- Alopia canescens (Charpentier, 1852)
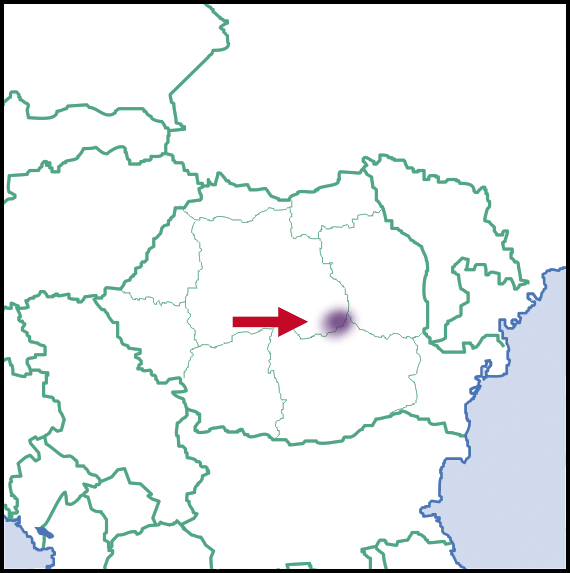

Synonyms
- Alopia (Alopia) canescens (Charpentier, 1852) · alternative representation; Clausilia (Alopia) canescens Charpentier, 1852; Clausilia canescens Charpentier, 1852 (original combination); Clausilia glorifica Rossmässler, 1856 (junior synonym)

= Alopia canescens =

Species of gastropod

Alopia canescens is a species of small, tropical, air-breathing land snail, a terrestrial pulmonate gastropod mollusk in the family Clausiliidae.

Subspecies

- Alopia canescens ambigua M. Kimakowicz, 1883
- Alopia canescens caesarea (M. Kimakowicz, 1894)
- Alopia canescens canescens (Charpentier, 1852)
- Alopia canescens costata (E. A. Bielz, 1859)
- Alopia canescens haueri (E. A. Bielz, 1859)
- Alopia canescens nefaria (M. Kimakowicz, 1894)
- Alopia canescens striicollis H. Nordsieck, 2024

== Description ==
The length of the shell varies between 13 mm and 14 mm, its diameter is 4 mm.

(Original description in Latin) It differs from Alopia livida straminicollis (Charpentier, 1852), to which it is very similar in appearance, by having a more constricted, somewhat turreted-fusiform shell, entirely smooth and frosted. It lacks palatal folds.

== Distribution ==
This species occurs in Romania.
