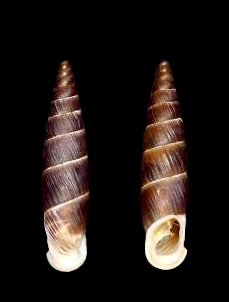
- Shell of Alopia lischkeana

Conservation status
- Least Concern (IUCN 3.1)

Scientific classification
- Kingdom: Animalia
- Phylum: Mollusca
- Class: Gastropoda
- Order: Stylommatophora
- Family: Clausiliidae
- Genus: Alopia
- Species: A. lischkeana

Binomial name
- Alopia lischkeana (Charpentier, 1852)
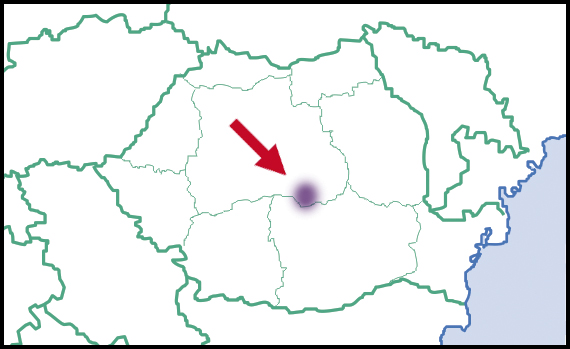

Synonyms
- Alopia (Alopia) lischkeana (Charpentier, 1852) alternative representation; Clausilia lischkeana Charpentier, 1852 (original combination)

= Alopia lischkeana =

Species of gastropod

Alopia lischkeana is a species of small, tropical, air-breathing land snail, a terrestrial pulmonate gastropod mollusk in the family Clausiliidae.

Subspecies

- Alopia lischkeana boettgeri M. Kimakowicz, 1883
- Alopia lischkeana cybaea (M. Kimakowicz, 1894)
- Alopia lischkeana galbina R. Kimakowicz, 1943
- Alopia lischkeana lischkeana (Charpentier, 1852)
- Alopia lischkeana livens (E. A. Bielz, 1853)
- Alopia lischkeana sarkanyi Szekeres, 2007
- Alopia lischkeana violacea (M. Kimakowicz, 1894)

== Description ==
The length of the shell varies between 13 mm and 22 mm, its diameter between 2.5 mm and 5 mm.

(Original description) A dextral shell with a slit, fusiform in shape, and lightly plicate-striated. It is moderately solid, slightly glossy, and dark violet-brown in color. The spire tapers regularly, with nearly straight sides from the penultimate whorl. The whorls are gently convex, with the body whorl appearing whitish and rough in front, slightly swollen near the narrow slit. The suture is lined with a white thread, sparsely adorned with papillate, striate structures. The aperture is rhomboid-oval. The lamellae are of moderate size, nearly equal, and converge towards the back. There are 3 palatal folds, with the third being short and somewhat broad; the subcolumellar fold is briefly visible, with no lunella. The clausilium is clearly visible deep within the throat. The peristome is continuous, free all around, expanded, and lined with white or brownish color on the inside.

== Distribution ==
This species occurs in Romania.
