= Alopia hirschfelderi =

Conservation status
- Endangered (IUCN 3.1)

Scientific classification
- Kingdom: Animalia
- Phylum: Mollusca
- Class: Gastropoda
- Order: Stylommatophora
- Family: Clausiliidae
- Genus: Alopia
- Species: A. hirschfelderi

Binomial name
- Alopia hirschfelderi H. Nordsieck, 2013

Synonyms
- Alopia (Alopia) hirschfelderi H. Nordsieck, 2013 alternative representation

Species of gastropod

Alopia hirschfelderi is a species of small, tropical, air-breathing land snail, a terrestrial pulmonate gastropod mollusk in the family Clausiliidae.

== Distribution ==
This species occurs in Romania.
