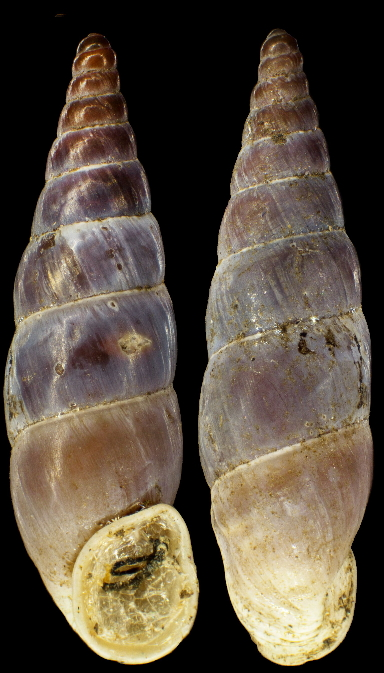
- Shell of Alopia nefasta helenae (specimen at the Biologiezentrum Linz, Austria)

Conservation status
- Least Concern (IUCN 3.1)

Scientific classification
- Domain: Eukaryota
- Kingdom: Animalia
- Phylum: Mollusca
- Class: Gastropoda
- Order: Stylommatophora
- Family: Clausiliidae
- Genus: Alopia
- Species: A. nefasta

Binomial name
- Alopia nefasta (M. Kimakowicz, 1894)
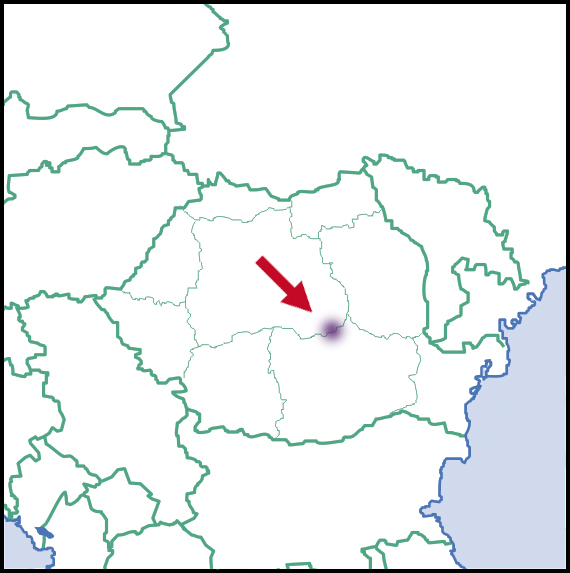

Synonyms
- Alopia (Alopia) nefasta (M. Kimakowicz, 1894) · alternative representation; Alopia (Alopia) canescens nefaria M. Kimakowicz, 1894; Clausilia (Alopia) nefasta M. Kimakowicz, 1894 (original combination)

= Alopia nefasta =

Species of gastropod

Alopia nefasta is a species of small, tropical, air-breathing land snail, a terrestrial pulmonate gastropod mollusk in the family Clausiliidae.

Subspecies

- Alopia nefasta ciucasiana Grossu, 1969
- Alopia nefasta helenae R. Kimakowicz, 1928
- Alopia nefasta mauritii R. Kimakowicz, 1928
- Alopia nefasta nefasta (M. Kimakowicz, 1894)
- Alopia nefasta zagani Szekeres, 1969

== Description ==
(Description originally in German of Alopia (Alopia) canescens nefaria) The length of the shell varies between 11.5 mm and 15 mm, its diameter between 3.5 mm and 4 mm.

The shell can be either dextral or sinistral, and is smaller and more swollen in shape. Its color ranges from brown-violet to dull blue, with a more prominent white suture thread and a yellowish-white, slightly bulging area behind the aperture.

The sculpture is similar to the typical form and consists primarily of more or less distinct growth lines, but can vary among specimens. It may range from clear ribbed lines to dense, even, and fairly sharp ridges, which either match the shell's color or appear lighter, sometimes even white. In some specimens, the lower lamella becomes faintly visible in the aperture; otherwise, the remaining features are consistent with the typical form.

== Distribution ==
This species occurs in Romania.
