= Alopia mafteiana =

Conservation status
- Vulnerable (IUCN 3.1)

Scientific classification
- Kingdom: Animalia
- Phylum: Mollusca
- Class: Gastropoda
- Order: Stylommatophora
- Family: Clausiliidae
- Genus: Alopia
- Species: A. mafteiana

Binomial name
- Alopia mafteiana Grossu, 1967

Synonyms
- Alopia (Alopia) mafteiana Grossu, 1967 alternative representation

Species of gastropod

Alopia mafteiana is a species of small, tropical, air-breathing land snail, a terrestrial pulmonate gastropod mollusk in the family Clausiliidae.

== Subspecies ==
- Alopia mafteiana mafteiana Grossu, 1967
- Alopia mafteiana valeriae Szekeres, 2007

== Description ==
The length of the shell attains 15 mm.

== Distribution ==
This species occurs in Romania.
