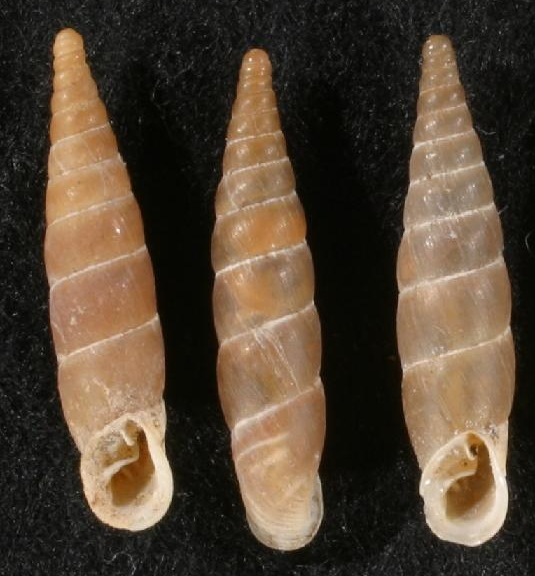
- Shell of Alopia meschendorferi

Conservation status
- Vulnerable (IUCN 3.1)

Scientific classification
- Kingdom: Animalia
- Phylum: Mollusca
- Class: Gastropoda
- Order: Stylommatophora
- Family: Clausiliidae
- Genus: Alopia
- Species: A. meschendorferi

Binomial name
- Alopia meschendorferi (E. A. Bielz, 1858)
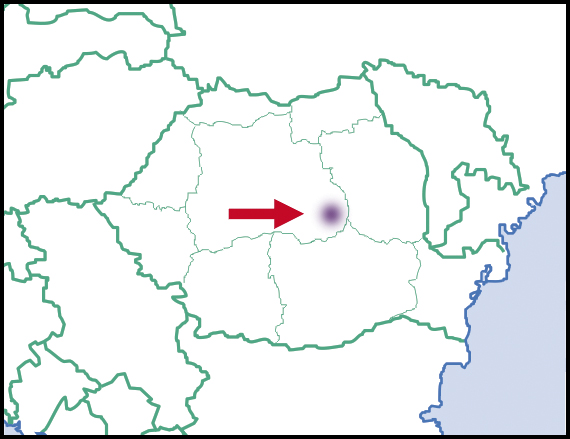

Synonyms
- Alopia (Alopia) meschendrferi (E. A. Bielz, 1858) alternative representation; Clausilia meschendorferi E. A. Bielz, 1858 (original combination)

= Alopia meschendorferi =

Species of gastropod

Alopia meschendorferi is a species of small, tropical, air-breathing land snail, a terrestrial pulmonate gastropod mollusk in the family Clausiliidae.

== Description ==
The length of the shell varies between 18 mm and 22mm, its diameter between 5 mm and 6 mm.

(Original description in German) The animal is yellow-grey, with a darker coloration along the back.

The right-handed shell is elongated and spindle-shaped, smooth, glossy, and quite robust. It is yellowish-horn colored, The 11-12 whorls are flattened, with a distinct white thread at the suture. The front of the neck is white and covered with delicate wrinkles. The brownish aperture is irregularly pear-shaped. The lip is continuous, applied, reflexed, and distinctly thickened. The upper lamella is moderate in size and close to the edge; the lower lamella is strong and curved, with the spiral lamella separated from the upper one. The snail features four palatal folds, the uppermost being the longest, with the moderately long second fold also visible in the aperture. The suture is prominent. The closing whorl at the apex is strongly notched and bilobed.

== Distribution ==
This species occurs in Romania.
