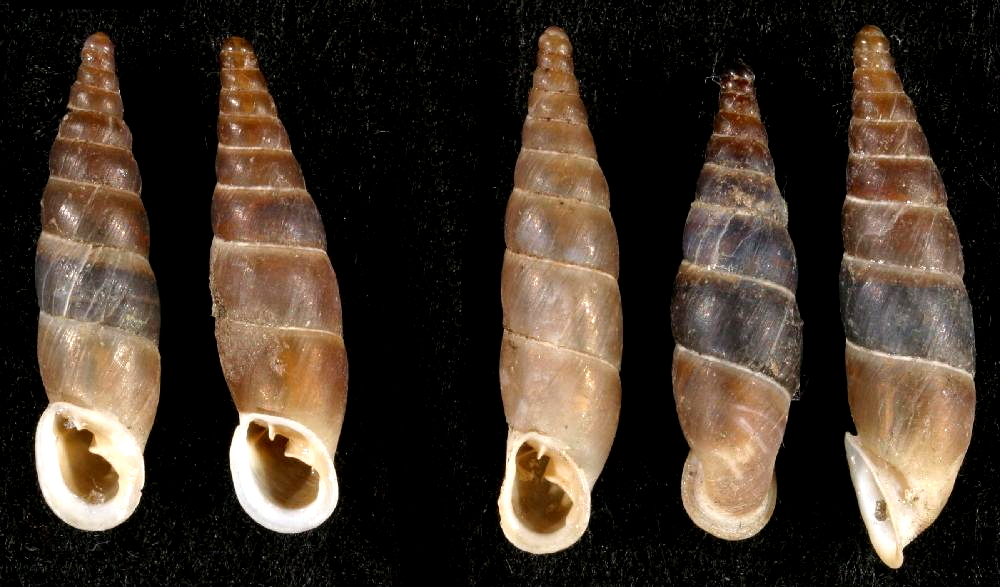
- Shell of Alopia plumbea

Conservation status
- Least Concern (IUCN 3.1)

Scientific classification
- Kingdom: Animalia
- Phylum: Mollusca
- Class: Gastropoda
- Order: Stylommatophora
- Family: Clausiliidae
- Genus: Alopia
- Species: A. plumbea

Binomial name
- Alopia plumbea (Rossmässler, 1839)
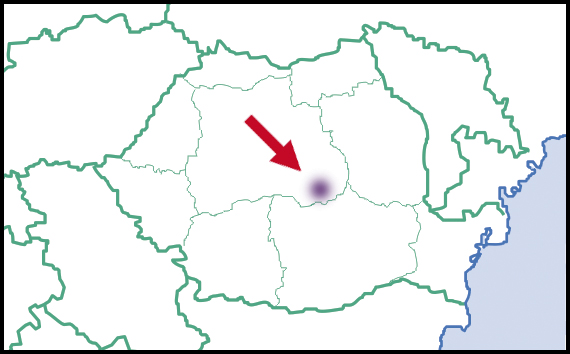

Synonyms
- Alopia (Alopia) plumbea (Rossmässler, 1839) · alternative representation; Clausilia plumbea Rossmässler, 1839 (original combination)

= Alopia plumbea =

Species of gastropod

Alopia plumbea is a species of small, tropical, air-breathing land snail, a terrestrial pulmonate gastropod mollusk in the family Clausiliidae.

Subspecies

- Alopia plumbea bellicosa (M. Kimakowicz, 1894)
- Alopia plumbea plumbea (Rossmässler, 1839)

== Description ==
The length of the shell varies between 14 mm and 26 mm, its diameter between 3 mm and 5.2 mm.

(original description in Latin) The shell has as slit and is fusiform, and swollen, with a livid hue and a slightly smooth surface. It features a white suture and a pear-shaped, rounded aperture. The peristome is continuous, slightly detached, reflexed, and white-lipped. There are four palatal folds: the two upper folds are long and converge on both sides, the third is very short, and the fourth is of moderate length. The lunate fold is absent, while the columellar fold is prominent. The lamellae are robust, with the lower one being curved. The clausilium has a notched apex.

(Description originally in Latin of Clausilia plumbea) It differs noticeably from other species in this genus: it is smaller in size, with a more slender, livid shell that is sometimes frosted. The suture is lined with a white thread, and the third palatal fold is short, merging with the second. Smaller specimens resemble Delima albocincta) (L. Pfeiffer, 1841) but can be immediately distinguished by the absence of a lunella."

== Distribution ==
This species occurs in Romania.
