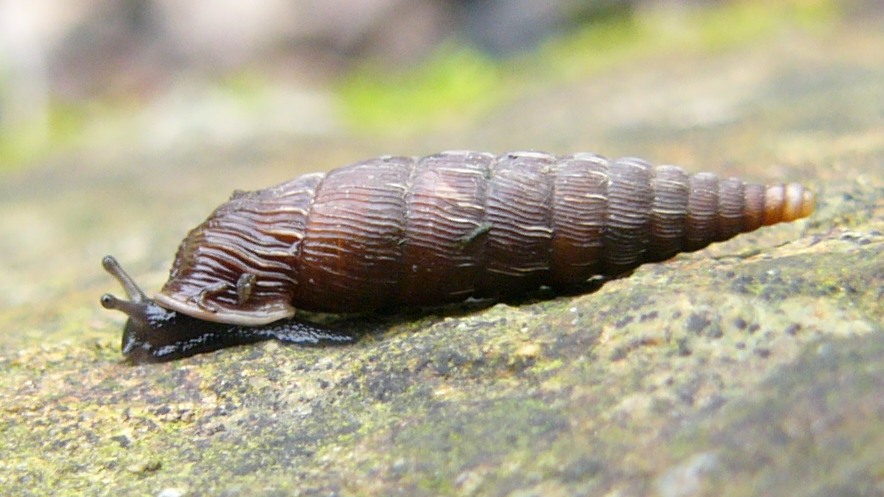
- A live individual of Laciniaria plicata

Scientific classification
- Kingdom: Animalia
- Phylum: Mollusca
- Class: Gastropoda
- Order: Stylommatophora
- Infraorder: Clausilioidei
- Superfamily: Clausilioidea
- Family: Clausiliidae
- Genus: Laciniaria; Hartmann, 1844

Type species
- Pupa plicata Draparnaud, 1801

Synonyms
- Clausilia (Laciniaria) Hartmann, 1842 (original rank); Laciniaria (Laciniaria) W. Hartmann, 1842; Rhodopiella H. Nordsieck, 1973

= Laciniaria =

Genus of gastropods

Laciniaria is a genus of small air-breathing land snails, terrestrial pulmonate gastropod mollusks in the subfamily Clausiliinae of the family Clausiliidae, the door snails.

== Species ==
Species within the genus Laciniaria include:

- Laciniaria bajula (A. Schmidt, 1868)
- Laciniaria exalta (Westerlund, 1878)
- Laciniaria macilenta (Rossmässler, 1842)
- Laciniaria plicata (Draparnaud, 1801)

Species brought into synonymy

- Laciniaria erberi Frauenfeld, 1867: synonym of Strigillaria denticulata erberi (Frauenfeld, 1867) (original combination)
