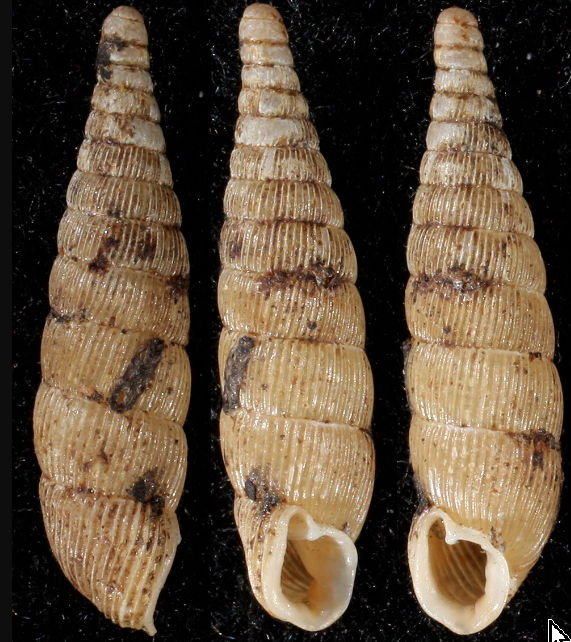
- Shell of Alinda jugularis

Scientific classification
- Kingdom: Animalia
- Phylum: Mollusca
- Class: Gastropoda
- Order: Stylommatophora
- Family: Clausiliidae
- Genus: Alinda
- Species: A. jugularis

Binomial name
- Alinda jugularis (Vest, 1859)
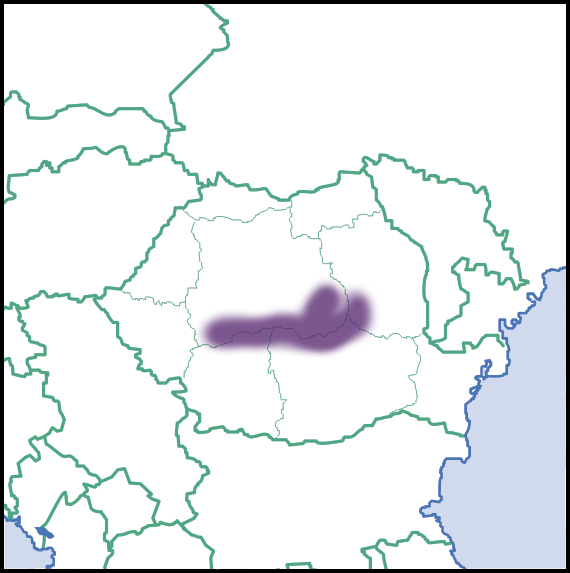

Synonyms
- Alinda (Pseudalinda) jugularis (Vest, 1859) alternative representation; Clausilia jugularis Vest, 1859 (original combination)

= Alinda jugularis =

Species of gastropod

Alinda jugularis is a species of air-breathing land snail, a terrestrial pulmonate gastropod mollusk in the family Clausiliidae, the door snails.

== Description ==
The length of the shell varies between 12 mm and 15 mm, its diameter between 2.5 mm and 3.6 mm.

== Distribution ==
This species occurs in Romania.
