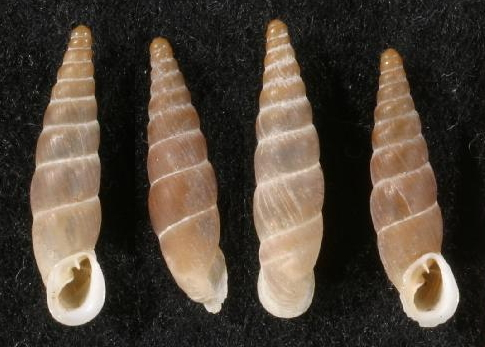
- Shell of Alopia mariae hildegardae

Conservation status
- Least Concern (IUCN 3.1)

Scientific classification
- Kingdom: Animalia
- Phylum: Mollusca
- Class: Gastropoda
- Order: Stylommatophora
- Family: Clausiliidae
- Genus: Alopia
- Species: A. mariae

Binomial name
- Alopia mariae R. Kimakowicz, 1931
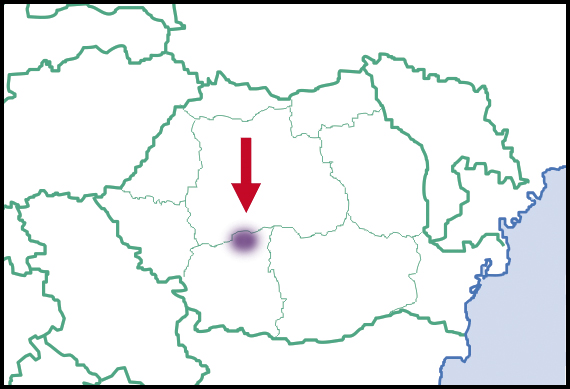

Synonyms
- Alopia (Alopia) mariae R. Kimakowicz, 1931 · alternative representation

= Alopia mariae =

Species of gastropod

Alopia mariae is a species of small, tropical, air-breathing land snail, a terrestrial pulmonate gastropod mollusk in the family Clausiliidae.

== Subspecies ==
- Alopia mariae coronata R. Kimakowicz, 1943
- Alopia mariae hildegardae R. Kimakowicz, 1931
- Alopia mariae mariae R. Kimakowicz, 1931
- Alopia mariae soosi R. A. Brandt, 1961

== Description ==
The length of the shell varies between 13 mm and 23 mm, its diameter between 3.5 mm and 5 mm.

== Distribution ==
This species occurs in Romania.
