= Alopia grossuana =

Conservation status
- Vulnerable (IUCN 3.1)

Scientific classification
- Kingdom: Animalia
- Phylum: Mollusca
- Class: Gastropoda
- Order: Stylommatophora
- Family: Clausiliidae
- Genus: Alopia
- Species: A. grossuana

Binomial name
- Alopia grossuana H. Nordsieck, 1977

Synonyms
- Alopia (Alopia) grossuana H. Nordsieck, 1977 alternative representation; Alopia (Alopia) microstoma grossuana H. Nordsieck, 1977 superseded combination (original name)

Species of gastropod

Alopia grossuana is a species of small, tropical, air-breathing land snail, a terrestrial pulmonate gastropod mollusk in the family Clausiliidae.

Subspecies

- Alopia grossuana grossuana H. Nordsieck, 1977
- Alopia grossuana nemethi Deli & Szekeres, 2011

== Distribution ==
This species occurs in Romania.
