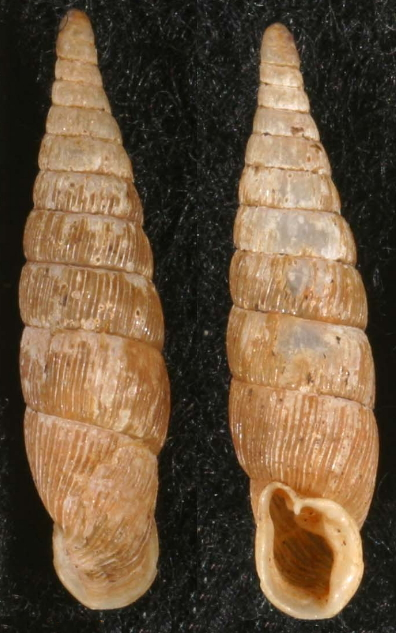
- Shell of Alinda stabilis (holotype)

Scientific classification
- Kingdom: Animalia
- Phylum: Mollusca
- Class: Gastropoda
- Order: Stylommatophora
- Family: Clausiliidae
- Genus: Alinda
- Species: A. stabilis

Binomial name
- Alinda stabilis (L. Pfeiffer, 1847)
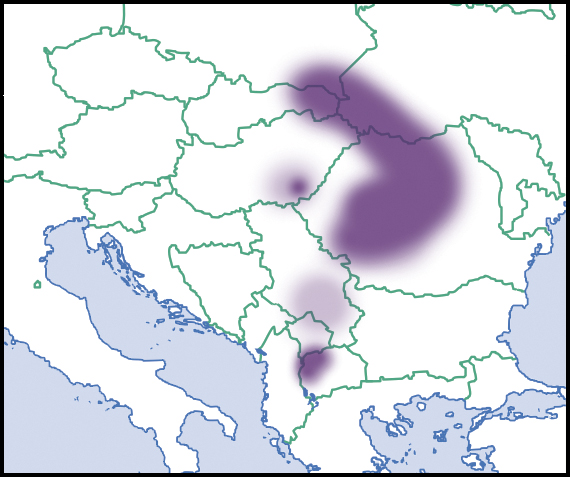

Synonyms
- Alinda (Pseudalinda) stabilis (L. Pfeiffer, 1847) · alternative representation; Balea (Pseudalinda) stabilis (L. Pfeiffer, 1847); Clausilia stabilis L. Pfeiffer, 1847 (original combination)

= Alinda stabilis =

Species of gastropod

Alinda stabilis is a species of air-breathing land snail, a terrestrial pulmonate gastropod mollusk in the family Clausiliidae, the door snails.

== Description ==
The length of the shell attains 14 mm, its diameter 3.5 mm.

(Original description in Latin) The shell shows an arched slit, it is club-shaped and spindle-like. It is solid, tightly folded, translucent, and glossy with a horn-yellow hue. The spire tapers abruptly above, with a somewhat blunt tip. It comprises 11 convex whorls. The body whorl is swollen behind the aperture, rough in texture, and features a short crest at the base. The aperture is oval-pyriform, distinctly canaliculated at the base, with a thick palatal callus that narrows linearly. The upper lamella is relatively large, while the lower one is deep and subvertical, marked by a distinct crescent-shaped fold. The upper palatal fold is visible, and the columellar fold is slightly submerged. The peristome is continuous, free, and expanded, with sinuated upper and outer margins.

== Distribution ==
This species occurs in Eastern Europe, mainly in Poland, Hungary and Romania.
