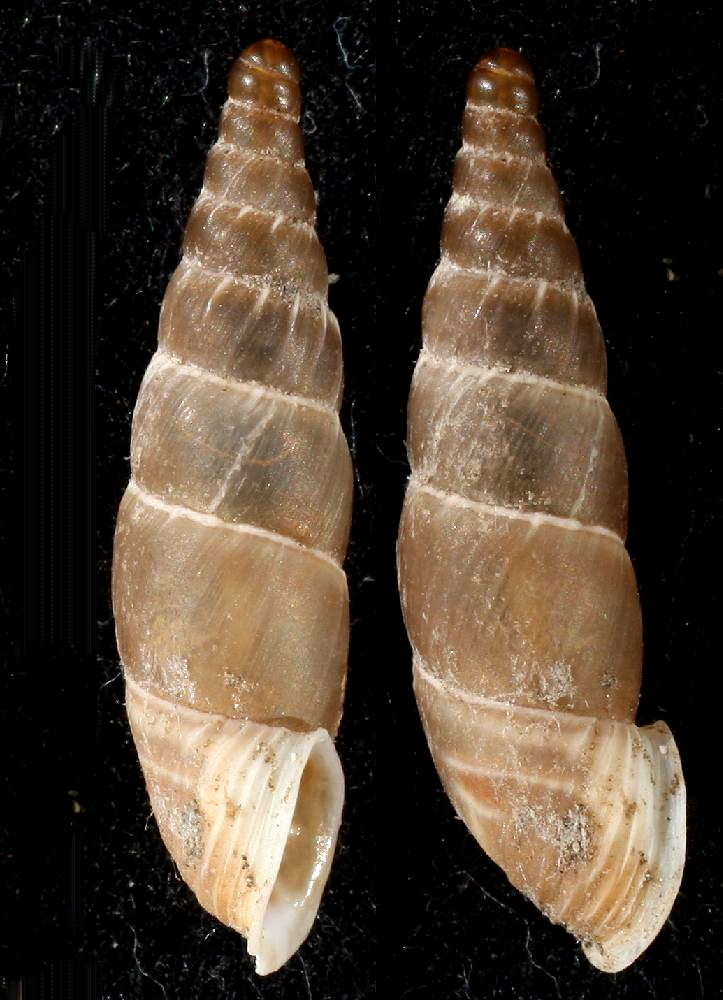
- Shell of Alopia vicina

Conservation status
- Near Threatened (IUCN 3.1)

Scientific classification
- Kingdom: Animalia
- Phylum: Mollusca
- Class: Gastropoda
- Order: Stylommatophora
- Family: Clausiliidae
- Genus: Alopia
- Species: A. vicina

Binomial name
- Alopia vicina (M. Kimakowicz, 1894)

Synonyms
- Alopia (Alopia) vicina (M. Kimakowicz, 1894)· alternative representation; Clausilia (Alopia) jickelii var. vicina M. Kimakowicz, 1894

= Alopia vicina =

Species of gastropod

Alopia vicina is a species of small, tropical, air-breathing land snail, a terrestrial pulmonate gastropod mollusk in the family Clausiliidae.

Subspecies

- Alopia vicina fortunata R. Kimakowicz, 1931
- Alopia vicina occulta R. Kimakowicz, 1931
- Alopia vicina tamasorum Szekeres, 2007
- Alopia vicina vicina (M. Kimakowicz, 1894)
- Alopia vicina var. coronata R. Kimakowicz, 1943: synonym of Alopia mariae coronata R. Kimakowicz, 1943 (superseded rank, basionym)

Taxa inquirenda

- Alopia vicina var. peregrina R. Kimakowicz, 1943
- Alopia vicina var. riessi R. Kimakowicz, 1943

== Description ==
The length of the shell varies between 15 mm and 21 mm, its diameter between 4 mm and 5 mm.

(Original description in German) This species can be distinguished from Alopia jickelii (a synonym of Alopia livida straminicollis (Charpentier, 1852)) by its significantly more swollen outer wall, which is broader and more rounded at the base, lacking the interrupted folds at the neck. The aperture is not trapezoidal but rather egg-shaped, with the basal fold either absent or only indicated by a small, subtle ridge near the uppermost palatal fold. The clausilium is similarly broad and structured like that of Alopia jickelii, but there is a small, narrow notch visible between the spindle and outer lobe.

== Distribution ==
This species occurs in Romania.
