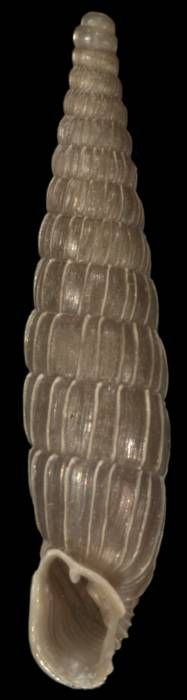
- Shell of Alinda atanasovi kremenensis (holotype)

Scientific classification
- Kingdom: Animalia
- Phylum: Mollusca
- Class: Gastropoda
- Order: Stylommatophora
- Family: Clausiliidae
- Genus: Alinda
- Species: A. atanasovi

Binomial name
- Alinda atanasovi (Urbański, 1964)

Synonyms
- Alinda (Alinda) atanasovi (Urbański, 1964) · alternative representation; Laciniaria (Alinda) biplicata atanasovi Urbański, 1964 (original combination); (Alinda) biplicata tenuispira Urbanski, 1968 (junior synonym)

= Alinda atanasovi =

Species of gastropod

Alinda atanasovi is a species of air-breathing land snail, a terrestrial pulmonate gastropod mollusk in the family Clausiliidae, the door snails.

Subspecies

- Alinda atanasovi atanasovi (Urbański, 1964)
- Alinda atanasovi kremenensis Dedov, 2009

== Distribution ==
This species occurs in Bulgaria.
