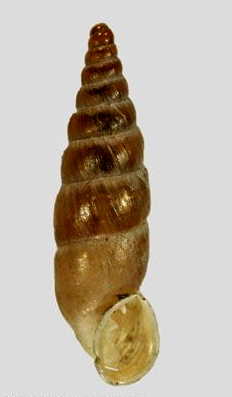
- Shell of Alopia bielzii madensis (specimen at the Natural History Museum, Rotterdam)

Conservation status
- Least Concern (IUCN 3.1)

Scientific classification
- Kingdom: Animalia
- Phylum: Mollusca
- Class: Gastropoda
- Order: Stylommatophora
- Family: Clausiliidae
- Genus: Alopia
- Species: A. bielzii

Binomial name
- Alopia bielzii (L. Pfeiffer, 1849)
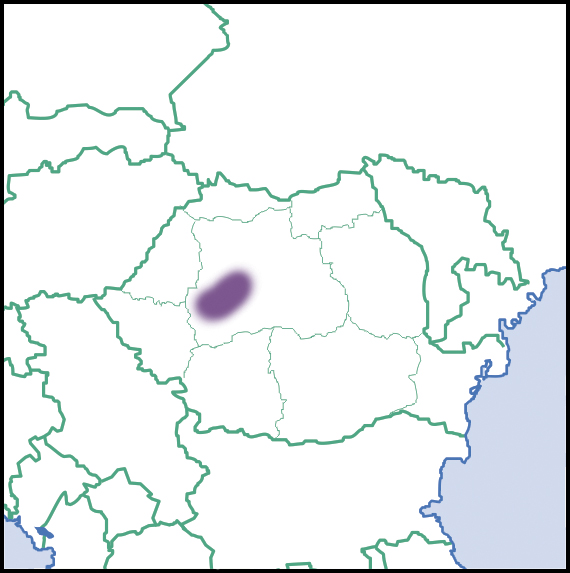

Synonyms
- ': Alopia (Alopia) bielzii (L. Pfeiffer, 1849) · alternative representation; Clausilia (Alopia) bielzii L. Pfeiffer, 1849 superseded combination; Clausilia bielzii L. Pfeiffer, 1849 (original combination)

= Alopia bielzii =

Species of gastropod

Alopia bielzii is a species of small, tropical, air-breathing land snail, a terrestrial pulmonate gastropod mollusk in the family Clausiliidae.

Subspecies

- Alopia bielzii bielzii (L. Pfeiffer, 1849)
- Alopia bielzii clathrata (E. A. Bielz, 1856)
- Alopia bielzii madensis (C. Fuss, 1855)
- Alopia bielzii tenuis (E. A. Bielz, 1861)

== Description ==
The length of the shell varies between 14 mm and 18 mm, its diameter between 3.7 mm and 4.5 mm.

(Original description in Latin) The shell is dextral with an arched slit. It is fusiform in shape, and is marked by strong, widely spaced white plications. It is somewhat translucent with an oily sheen and a violet-brown coloration. The spire tapers evenly to a somewhat blunt apex and consists of 9 to 10.5 whorls, with the upper whorls being convex and the lower ones slightly flattened, while the body whorl is compressed at the base. The aperture is oblong-oval and has no lip. The peristome is continuous, briefly detached, and expanded, with a pale-horny hue. It features converging lamellae, lacks a fold on the lunate plica, and has four prominent palatal plicae with a barely visible columellar plica.

== Distribution ==
This species occurs in Romania and Slovakia.
