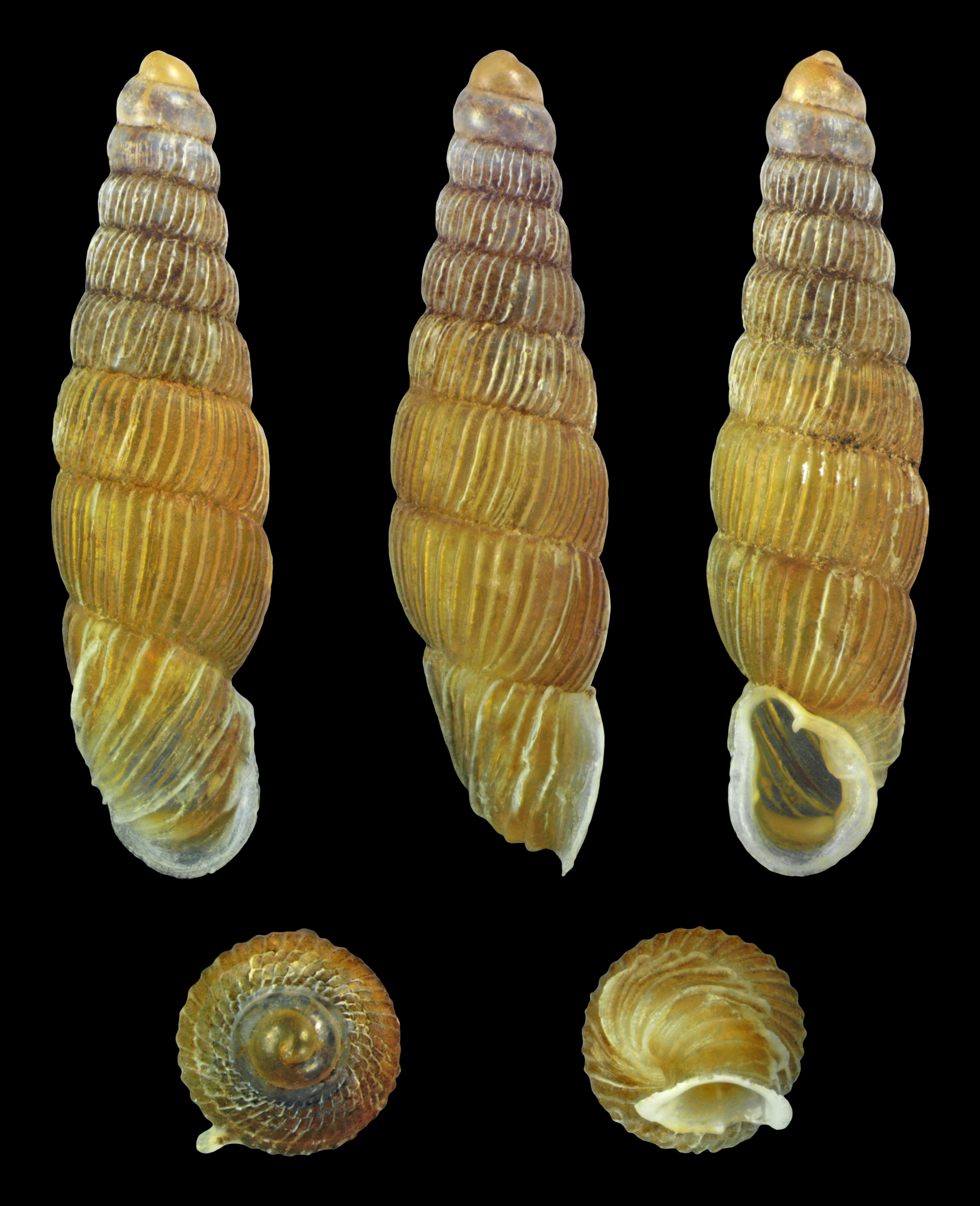
- Ruthenica filograna filograna

Scientific classification
- Kingdom: Animalia
- Phylum: Mollusca
- Class: Gastropoda
- Order: Stylommatophora
- Family: Clausiliidae
- Genus: Ruthenica
- Species: R. filograna

Binomial name
- Ruthenica filograna (Rossmässler, 1836)

Synonyms
- Clausilia filograna Rossmässler, 1836 (original combination); Clausilia filograna var. sancta Clessin, 1872 (not Bourguignat, 1868)

= Ruthenica filograna =

Species of gastropod

Ruthenica filograna is a species of air-breathing land snail, a terrestrial pulmonate gastropod mollusk in the family Clausiliidae, the door snails, all of which have a clausilium.

Subspeciesd

- Ruthenica filograna catarrhactae (E. A. Bielz, 1861)
- Ruthenica filograna filograna (Rossmässler, 1836)
- Ruthenica filograna kimakowiczi H. Nordsieck, 2019
- Ruthenica filograna pocaterrae Egorov, 2022
- Ruthenica filograna polita (M. Kimakowicz, 1883)
- Ruthenica filograna streicola H. Nordsieck, 2019

== Distribution ==
This species is not listed in IUCN Red List - not evaluated (NE)

The native distribution of this species is Baltic, Central European and Eastern European. It has been recorded from:

- The Czech Republic
- Slovakia
- Ukraine
- and others

The habitat of this species is woodland.
