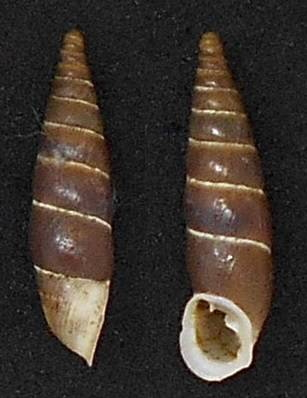
- Shell of Alopia monacha

Conservation status
- Least Concern (IUCN 3.1)

Scientific classification
- Domain: Eukaryota
- Kingdom: Animalia
- Phylum: Mollusca
- Class: Gastropoda
- Order: Stylommatophora
- Family: Clausiliidae
- Genus: Alopia
- Species: A. monacha

Binomial name
- Alopia monacha (M. Kimakowicz, 1894)

Synonyms
- Alopia (Alopia) monacha (M. Kimakowicz, 1894) · alternative representation; Clausilia (Alopia) canescens nixa var. monacha M. Kimakowicz, 1894 (unavailable; infrasubspecific name)

= Alopia monacha =

Species of gastropod

Alopia monacha is a species of small, tropical, air-breathing land snail, a terrestrial pulmonate gastropod mollusk in the family Clausiliidae.

== Description ==
(Description originally in German of Clausilia (Alopia) canescens nixa var. monacha) The sinistral shell has a somewhat swollen spindle shape. It contains 9½ flatly rounded whorls separated by a shallow suture. The shell is translucent, glossy, with very fine to indistinct growth lines, which become more pronounced at the suture of the upper whorls and there form fine stripe-like papillae. On the body whorl, and especially near the aperture, they transition into dense, even rib-like streaks.

The color ranges from dark reddish-brown to violet-brown, with a sharply defined white suture thread and a yellowish-white band around the aperture. An opaque surface layer is indicated only as a weak, often indistinct hue.

The body whorl features a weak to indistinct basal keel. The lip is continuous, always detached, colored light yellow-brown like the palate, with a more pronounced white lip inside. Above the sinulus (a concave part of the outer lip) is a bright, dot-like palatal callus. The sinulus of the aperture is slightly raised.

The clausilium consists of a short but ridge-like raised upper lamella, which does not reach the lip at the front and remains quite distant from the short, similarly ridge-like raised spiral lamella at the back; an arch-shaped lower lamella projects into the aperture, ending away from the lip. The short principal fold begins at the dorsal line and either ends midway between it and the aperture or reaches the palatal callus above the sinulus. In addition, there is a short upper palatal fold that diverges from the principal fold and a similarly short basal fold. Between these folds, 1-2 very short, nodule-like folds often appear, which sometimes merge into the remnant of a columellar fold.

== Distribution ==
This species occurs in Romania.
