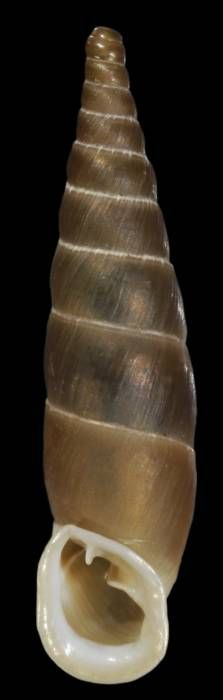
- Shell of Alopia regalis

Conservation status
- Least Concern (IUCN 3.1)

Scientific classification
- Kingdom: Animalia
- Phylum: Mollusca
- Class: Gastropoda
- Order: Stylommatophora
- Family: Clausiliidae
- Genus: Alopia
- Species: A. regalis

Binomial name
- Alopia regalis (M. Bielz, 1851)
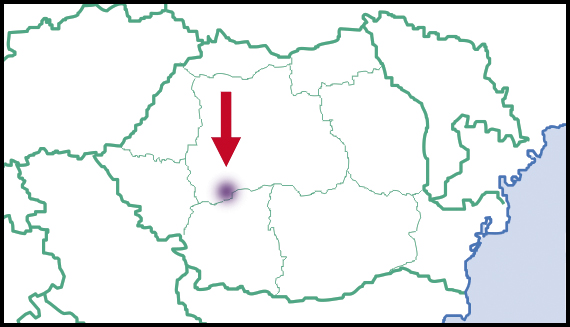

Synonyms
- Alopia (Alopia) regalis) (M. Bielz, 1851) alternative representation; Clausilia (Alopia) regalis M. Bielz, 1851 superseded combination; Clausilia regalis M. Bielz, 1851 (original combination)

= Alopia regalis =

Species of gastropod

Alopia regalis is a species of small, tropical, air-breathing land snail, a terrestrial pulmonate gastropod mollusk in the family Clausiliidae.

Subspecies

- Alopia regalis deubeli (Clessin, 1890)
- Alopia regalis doftanae H. Nordsieck, 1977
- Alopia regalis glabriuscula (Rossmässler, 1858)
- Alopia regalis microstoma (M. Kimakowicz, 1883)
- Alopia regalis nordsiecki Grossu & Tesio, 1973
- Alopia regalis petrensis H. Nordsieck, 1996
- Alopia regalis proclivis (M. Kimakowicz, 1894)
- Alopia regalis regalis (M. Bielz, 1851)
- Alopia regalis sabinae R. Kimakowicz, 1928
- Alopia regalis wagneri (M. Kimakowicz, 1894)
- Alopia regalis mutabilis (M. Kimakowicz, 1894): taxon inquirendum (based on an unavailable original name; the oldest synonym becomes the accepted name of this taxon)

== Description ==
The length of the shell varies between 14 mm and 16 mm its diameter between 3.9 mm and .5 mm.

The violet-brown shell is nearly smooth, with fine ribbing near the aperture. The suture is white, and the interior of the aperture is yellowish-brown. The margin is slightly reflected. The parietal and columellar folds are well developed, with a long principal fold and a shorter upper palatal fold, while no additional palatal folds are present.

== Distribution ==
This species occurs in Romania and Croatia.
