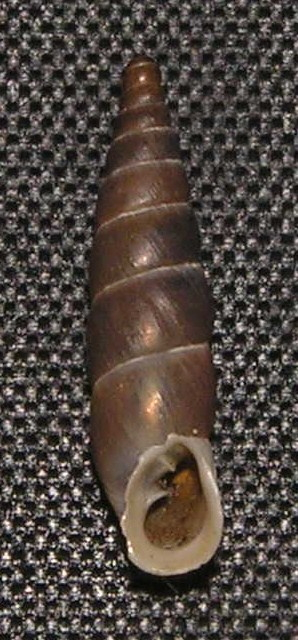
- Shell of Alopia livida

Conservation status
- Least Concern (IUCN 3.1)

Scientific classification
- Kingdom: Animalia
- Phylum: Mollusca
- Class: Gastropoda
- Order: Stylommatophora
- Family: Clausiliidae
- Genus: Alopia
- Species: A. livida

Binomial name
- Alopia livida (Menke, 1828)
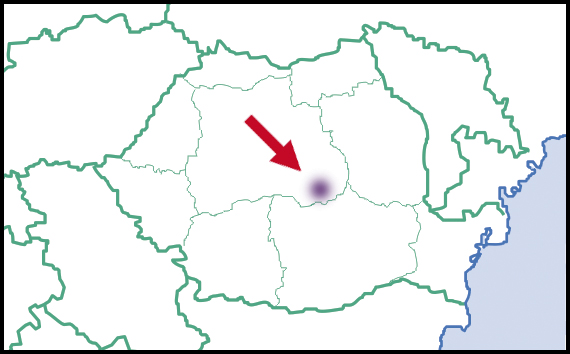

Synonyms
- Alopia (Alopia) livida (Menke, 1828) · alternative representation; Alopia (Alopia) livida bipalatalis (M. Kimakowicz, 1883) (junior synonym); Alopia livida bipalatalis (M. Kimakowicz, 1883) (junior synonym); Balea livida (Menke, 1828) superseded combination; Clausilia (Alopia) livida Menke, 1828 superseded combination; Clausilia (Alopia) livida f. bipalatalis M. Kimakowicz, 1883 superseded combination; Clausilia livida Menke, 1828 (original name)

= Alopia livida =

Species of gastropod

Alopia livida is a species of small, tropical, air-breathing land snail, a terrestrial pulmonate gastropod mollusk in the family Clausiliidae.

Subspecies

- Alopia livida deaniana A. H. Cooke, 1922
- Alopia livida julii A. J. Wagner, 1914
- Alopia livida livida (Menke, 1828)
- Alopia livida straminicollis (Charpentier, 1852)
- Alopia livida vargabandii Fehér & Szekeres, 2019

== Description ==
The length of the shell varies between 12 mm and 2 mm, its diameter between 3.5 mm and 5 mm.

(Description in Latin of Balea livida) A dextral, fusiform shell with a slit. The shell is violet, featuring a white suture and fine striations. The aperture is broadly oval, and the cervix (the section of the shell between the aperture and the spire) is white and striated. The peristome is continuous, attached, slightly reflexed, and lip-like. The columella has a single fold, and there is a small fold on the aperture wall.

== Distribution ==
This species occurs in Romania.
