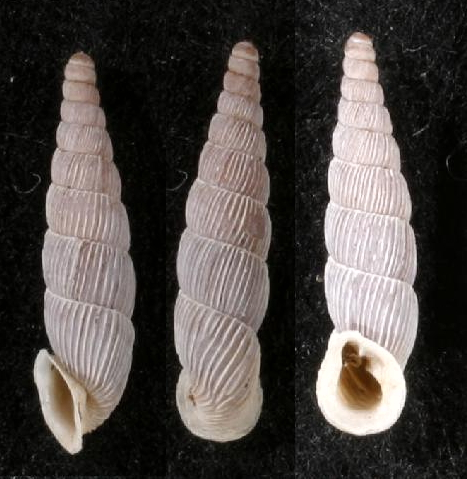
- Shell of Alopia maciana

Conservation status
- Vulnerable (IUCN 3.1)

Scientific classification
- Kingdom: Animalia
- Phylum: Mollusca
- Class: Gastropoda
- Order: Stylommatophora
- Family: Clausiliidae
- Genus: Alopia
- Species: A. maciana

Binomial name
- Alopia maciana Bădărău & Szekeres, 2001
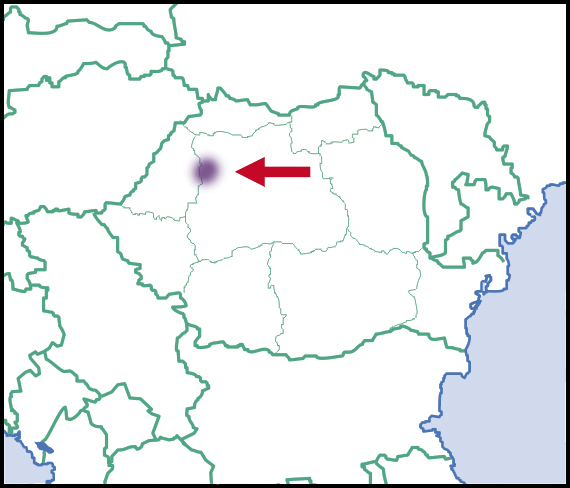

Synonyms
- Alopia (Kimakowiczia) maciana Bădărău & Szekeres, 2001 · alternative representation

= Alopia maciana =

Species of gastropod

Alopia maciana is a species of small, tropical, air-breathing land snail, a terrestrial pulmonate gastropod mollusk in the family Clausiliidae.

== Description ==
The length of the shell attains 14.7 mm.

== Distribution ==
This species occurs in Romania.
