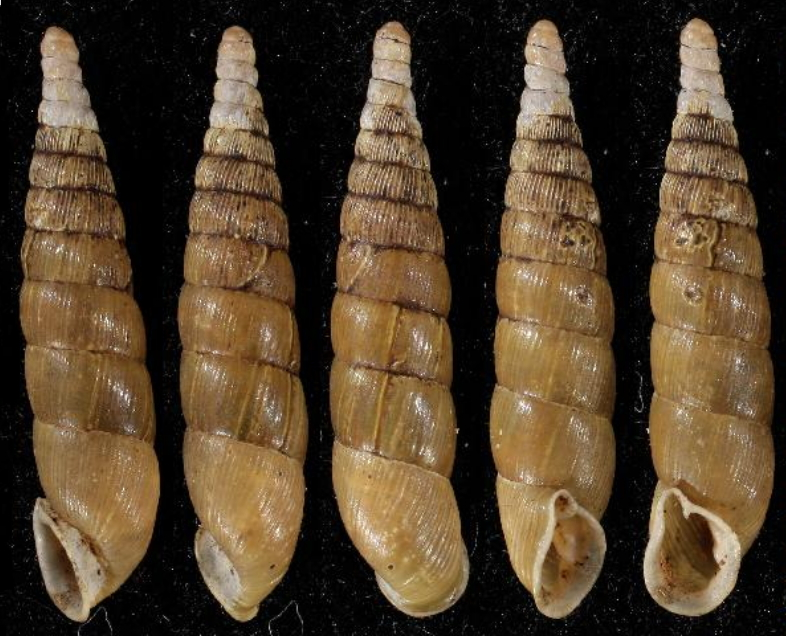
- Shell of Alinda viridana

Scientific classification
- Kingdom: Animalia
- Phylum: Mollusca
- Class: Gastropoda
- Order: Stylommatophora
- Family: Clausiliidae
- Genus: Alinda
- Species: A. viridana

Binomial name
- Alinda viridana (Rossmässler, 1836)
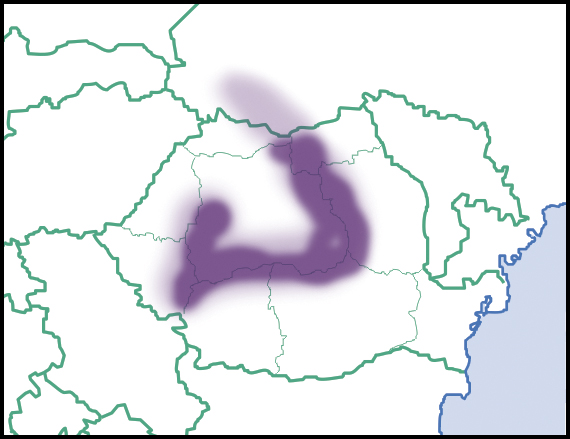

Synonyms
- Alinda (Pseudalinda) viridana (Rossmässler, 1836) · alternative representation; Clausilia montana L. Pfeiffer, 1847 (junior synonym); Clausilia viridana Rossmässler, 1836 (original combination)

= Alinda viridana =

Species of gastropod

Alinda viridana is a species of air-breathing land snail, a terrestrial pulmonate gastropod mollusk in the family Clausiliidae, the door snails.

== Description ==
The length of the shell attains 20 mm, its diameter 4.3 mm.

(Original description in Latin of Clausilia montana) The shell is fusiform-cylindrical with an arched slit. It is solid, tightly folded, and slightly glossy, with a horn-yellow coloration. The spire is cylindrical, gradually tapering to a blunt apex, and the suture is impressed with a slight margin. The shell consists of 13 whorls, with the first 9 to 10 being convex and the subsequent ones somewhat flattened. The body whorl is rough at the front, featuring a very short crest at the base. The aperture is oblong-pyriform, with a moderately sized upper lamella and a deep, slightly branched lower lamella. The crescent-shaped fold is narrow, accompanied by a single upper palatal fold, while the columellar fold is slightly submerged. The peristome is continuous, free, and only slightly expanded, with a thick white lip on the inside.

== Distribution ==
This species occurs in Romania.
