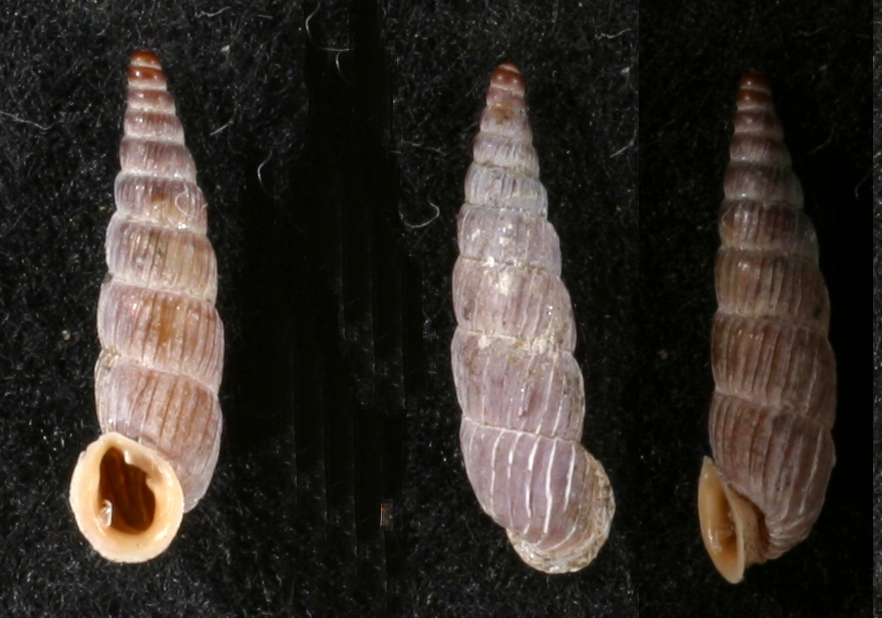
- Shell of Alopia pomatias

Conservation status
- Least Concern (IUCN 3.1)

Scientific classification
- Kingdom: Animalia
- Phylum: Mollusca
- Class: Gastropoda
- Order: Stylommatophora
- Family: Clausiliidae
- Genus: Alopia
- Species: A. pomatias

Binomial name
- Alopia pomatias (L. Pfeiffer, 1868)
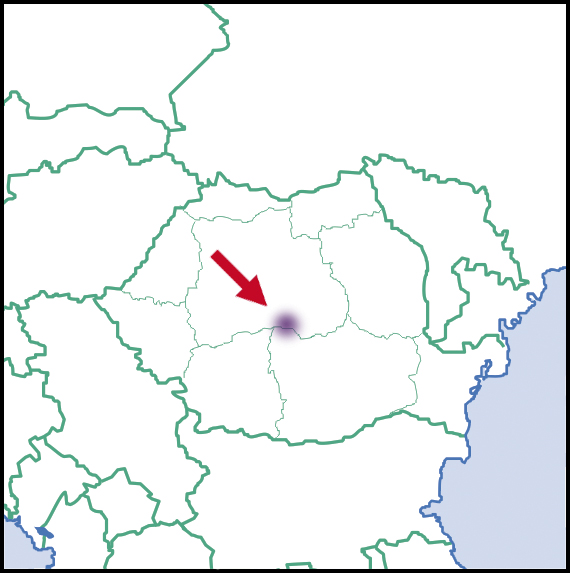

Synonyms
- Alopia (Kimakowiczia) grossui Hudec, 1970 junior subjective synonym; Alopia (Kimakowiczia) pomatias (L. Pfeiffer, 1868) · alternative representation; Alopia cyclostoma (E. A. Bielz, 1858) junior homonym; Alopia soosiana Agócsy & Pócs, 1961 junior subjective synonym (original name); Balea cyclostoma E. A. Bielz, 1858; Clausilia (Alopia) cyclostoma (E. A. Bielz, 1858); Clausilia pomatias L. Pfeiffer, 1868 (original combination)

= Alopia pomatias =

Species of gastropod

Alopia pomatias is a species of small, tropical, air-breathing land snail, a terrestrial pulmonate gastropod mollusk in the family Clausiliidae.

Subspecies

- Alopia pomatias albicostata (M. Kimakowicz, 1894)
- Alopia pomatias pomatias (L. Pfeiffer, 1868)

== Description ==
The length of the shell attains 14 mm, its diameter 4 mm.

(Original description of Balea cyclostoma was in Latin) The solid, sinistral shell is deeply fissured and spindle-shaped with a turreted form, exhibiting a rich dark violet-brown coloration. Its spire tapers regularly toward a slightly pointed, blackish-brown apex. The suture is whitish, with a papillary, thread-like appearance. There are nine slightly convex whorls, with the body whorl somewhat compressed at the base and barely detached at the front, featuring distinctive white ribbing. The oblique aperture is pear-shaped to rounded, while the upper lamella is small and the lower lamella is deeply set. The continuous peristome is expanded and flattened, edged with a clean white lip.

== Distribution ==
This species occurs in Romania.
