= Alopia alpina =

Conservation status
- Vulnerable (IUCN 3.1)

Scientific classification
- Kingdom: Animalia
- Phylum: Mollusca
- Class: Gastropoda
- Order: Stylommatophora
- Family: Clausiliidae
- Genus: Alopia
- Species: A. alpina

Binomial name
- Alopia alpina R. Kimakowicz, 1933

Synonyms
- Alopia (Alopia) alpina R. Kimakowicz, 1933 alternative representation

Species of gastropod

Alopia alpina is a species of small, tropical, air-breathing land snail, a terrestrial pulmonate gastropod mollusk in the family Clausiliidae.

== Distribution ==
This species occurs in Romania.
