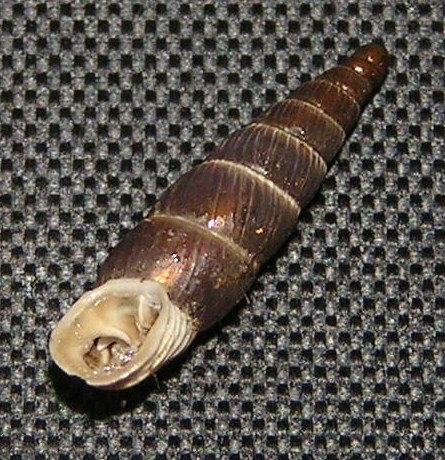
- Shell of Alopia glorifica

Conservation status
- Least Concern (IUCN 3.1)

Scientific classification
- Domain: Eukaryota
- Kingdom: Animalia
- Phylum: Mollusca
- Class: Gastropoda
- Order: Stylommatophora
- Family: Clausiliidae
- Genus: Alopia
- Species: A. glorifica

Binomial name
- Alopia glorifica (Charpentier, 1852)
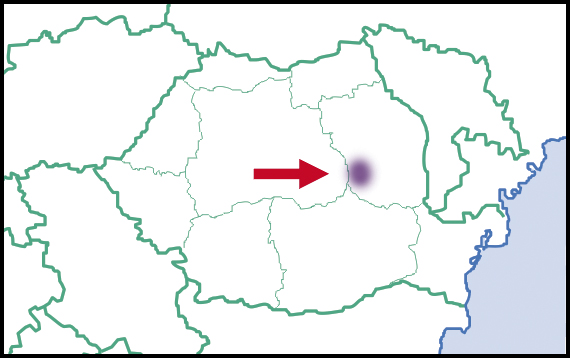

Synonyms
- Alopia (Alopia) glorifica (Charpentier, 1852) · alternative representation; Balea glorifica Rossmässler, 1856

= Alopia glorifica =

Species of gastropod

Alopia glorifica is a species of small, tropical, air-breathing land snail, a terrestrial pulmonate gastropod mollusk in the family Clausiliidae.

Subspecies

- Alopia glorifica deceptans Deli & Szekeres, 2011
- Alopia glorifica elegantissima H. Nordsieck, 1977
- Alopia glorifica glorifica (Charpentier, 1852)
- Alopia glorifica intercedens (A. Schmidt, 1857)
- Alopia glorifica magnifica R. Kimakowicz, 1962
- Alopia glorifica subita (M. Kimakowicz, 1894)
- Alopia glorifica valachiensis (O. Boettger, 1879)
- Alopia glorifica vranceana Grossu, 1967
- Alopia glorifica sarkanyi Szekeres, 2007: synonym of Alopia lischkeana sarkanyi Szekeres, 2007 (basionym)
- Alopia glorifica valeriae Szekeres, 2007: synonym of Alopia mafteiana valeriae Szekeres, 2007 (basionym)
- Alopia glorifica var. galbina R. Kimakowicz, 1943: synonym of Alopia lischkeana galbina R. Kimakowicz, 1943 (superseded rank)

== Description ==
The length of the shell varies between 12 mm and 22 mm, its diameter between 3.5 mm and 5 mm.

(Original description) The entire shell is plicated, with widely spaced, slightly raised whorls. It has three deep palatal folds, with the upper one being distinct and the others faint.

(Description originally in Latin of Balea glorifica) A sinistral shell, deeply rimate and fusiform, covered by an epidermis with bluish and cherry-red tones, and lightly striated. It features 8 white, convex whorls with an impressed suture. The spire is swollen, striated, and has anterior plicate ribs. The aperture is pear-shaped and rounded, with a continuous peristome that is slightly reflexed and somewhat thickened. The interior is either white or liver-colored. The spire concludes with a subtly expressed, oblique, striated lamella. The aperture wall is briefly uniplicate near the margin.

== Distribution ==
This species occurs in Romania.
