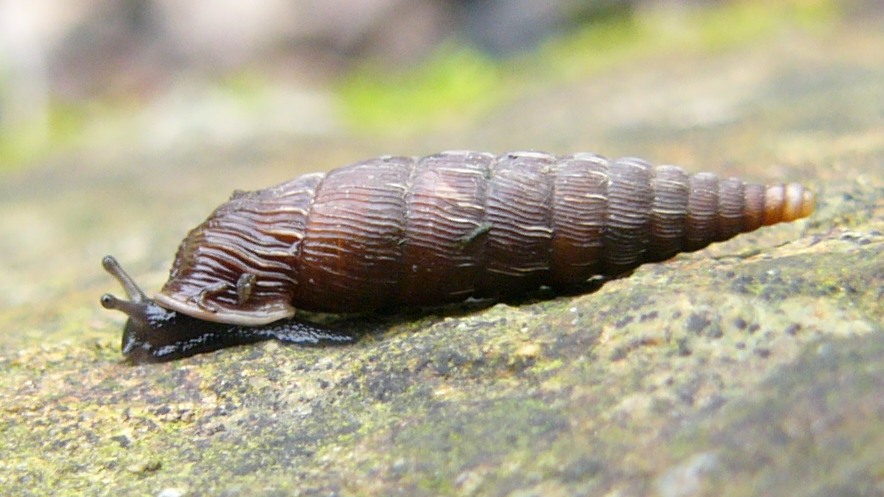
- A live individual of Laciniaria plicata

Scientific classification
- Kingdom: Animalia
- Phylum: Mollusca
- Class: Gastropoda
- Order: Stylommatophora
- Family: Clausiliidae
- Genus: Laciniaria
- Species: L. plicata

Binomial name
- Laciniaria plicata (Draparnaud, 1801)

Synonyms
- Clausilia plicata (Draparnaud, 1801) (superseded combination); Laciniaria (Laciniaria) plicata (Draparnaud, 1801) (superseded generic combination); Pupa plicata Draparnaud, 1801

= Laciniaria plicata =

Species of gastropod

Laciniaria plicata is a species of small air-breathing land snail, a terrestrial pulmonate gastropod mollusk in the family Clausiliidae, the door snails.

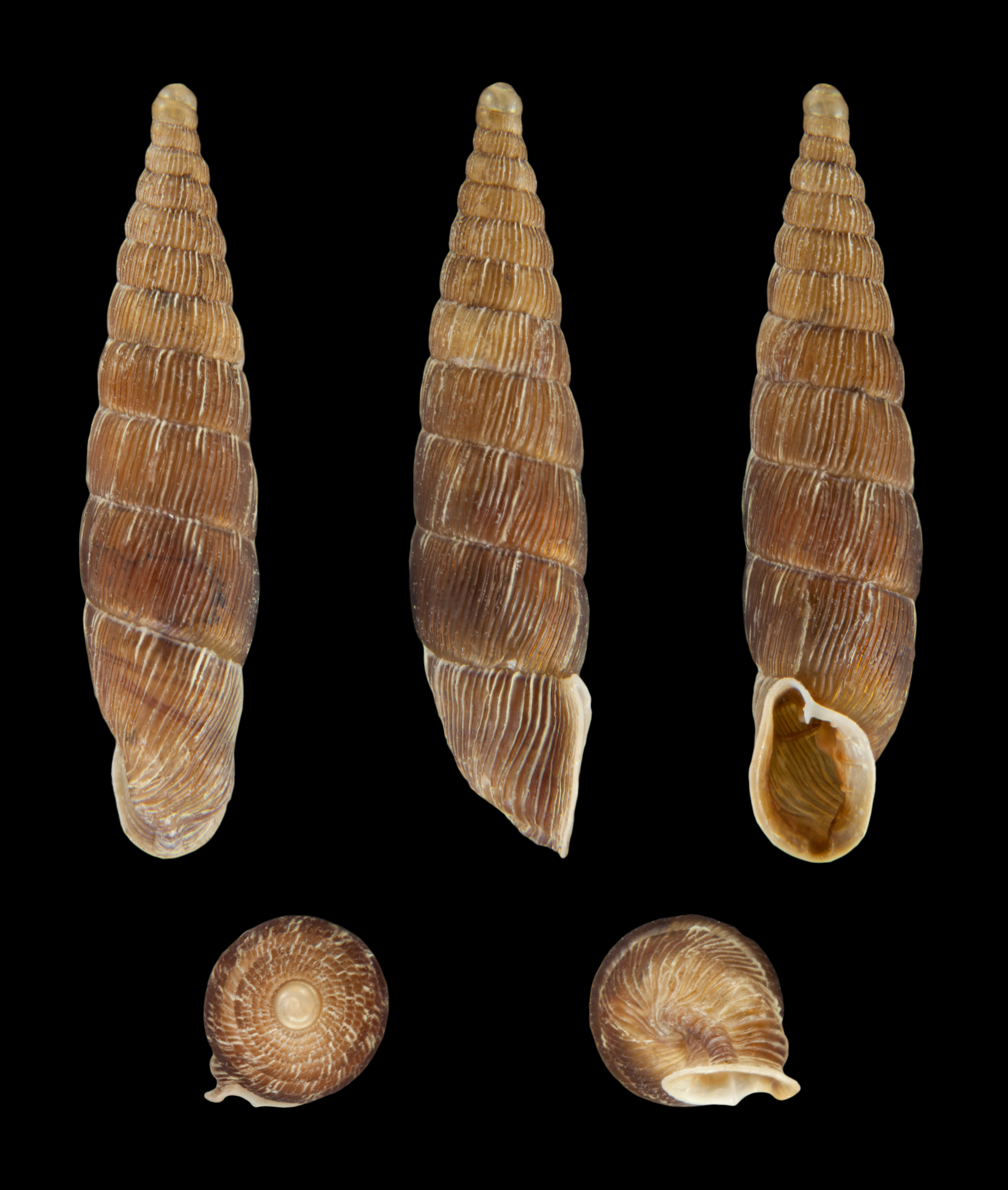
Normally growing form

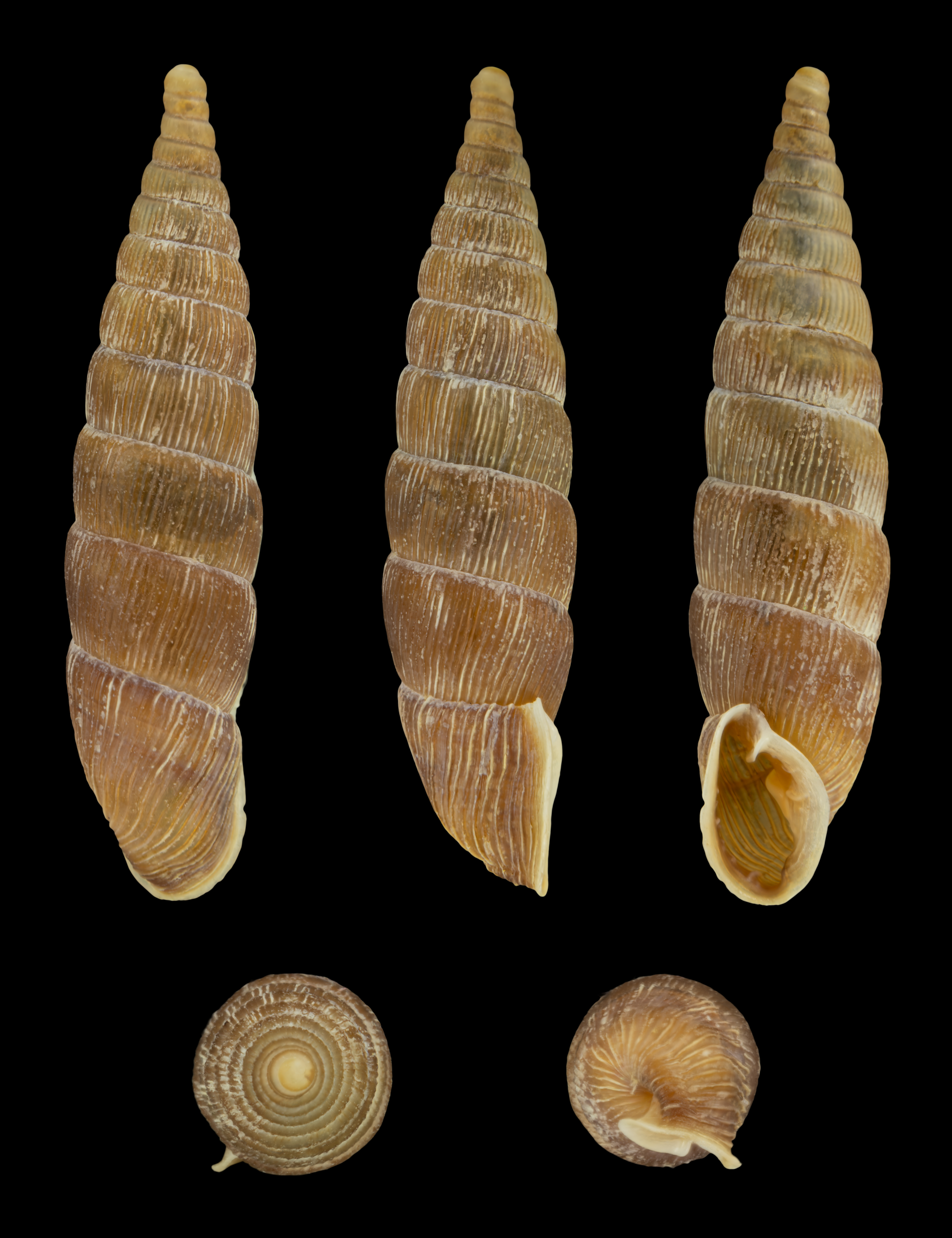
Large-growing form

== Subspecies ==
- Laciniaria plicata coarctata A. Schmidt, 1868
- Laciniaria plicata costigera H. Nordsieck, 2008
- Laciniaria plicata excepta (A. Schmidt, 1868)
- Laciniaria plicata kueprijae H. Nordsieck, 1973
- Laciniaria plicata plicata (Draparnaud, 1801)
- Laciniaria plicata rhodopensis H. Nordsieck, 2008
- Laciniaria plicata transsylvanica (M. Kimakowicz, 1883)
- Laciniaria plicata valkanovi Urbański, 1964

== Distribution ==
This species occurs in:

- Bulgaria
- Czech Republic
- Poland
- Slovakia
- Ukraine
- and other areas
