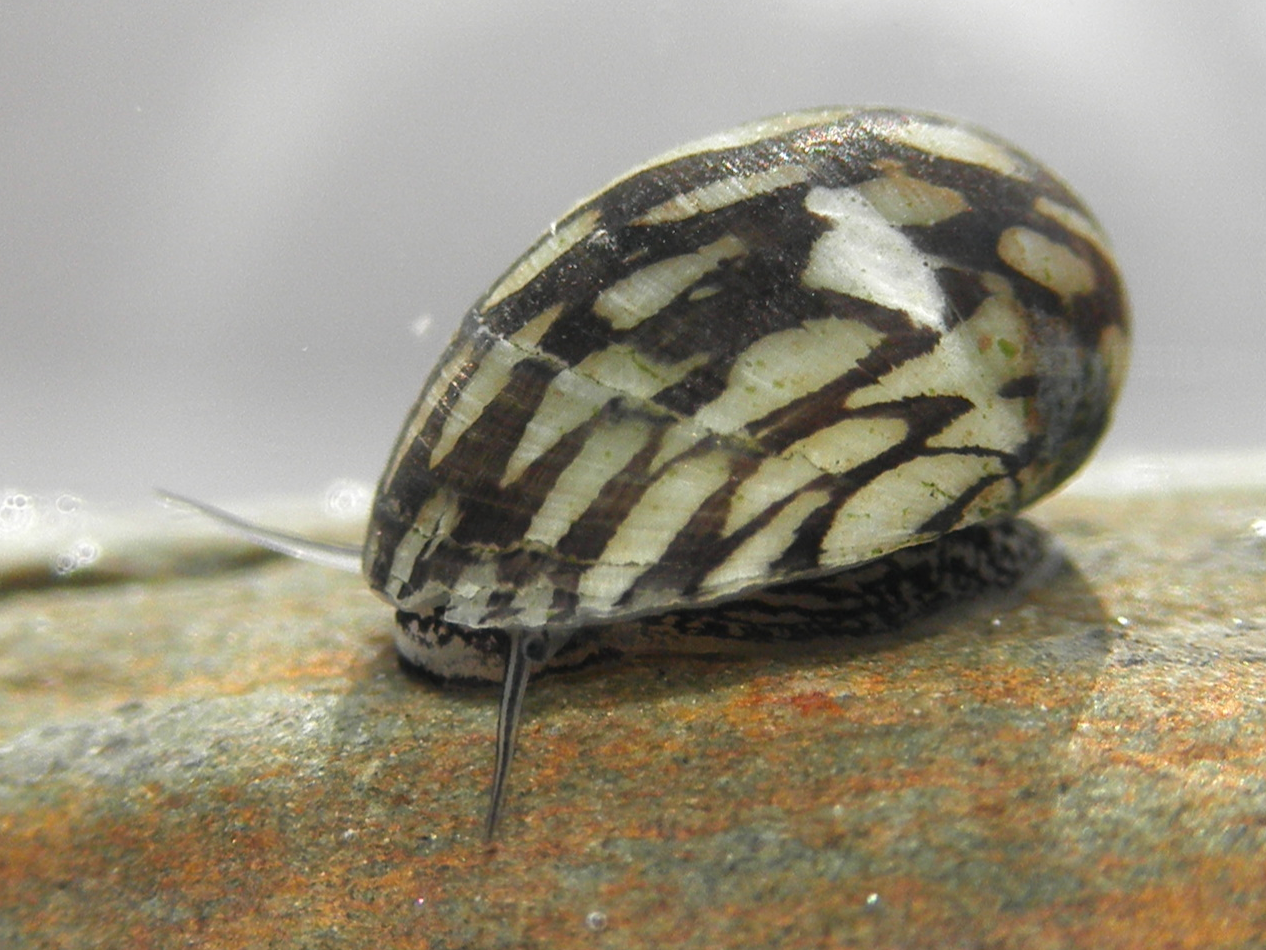
- An oblique left side view of a live Theodoxus fluviatilis

Conservation status
- Least Concern (IUCN 3.1)

Scientific classification
- Kingdom: Animalia
- Phylum: Mollusca
- Class: Gastropoda
- Order: Cycloneritida
- Family: Neritidae
- Genus: Theodoxus
- Species: T. fluviatilis

Binomial name
- Theodoxus fluviatilis (Linnaeus, 1758)

Synonyms
- Nerita fluviatilis Linnaeus, 1758; Neritina fluviatilis (Linnaeus, 1758); Theodoxus lutetianus Montfort, 1810 (unnecessary substitute name for Nerita fluviatilis Linnaeus, 1758); Theodoxus balticus (Nilsson, 1821); Theodoxus halophilus (Klett, 1828); Theodoxus trifasciatus (Menke, 1828); Theodoxus rhodocolpa De Cristofori & Jan, 1832; Theodoxus thermalis (Boubée, 1833); Theodoxus intextus A. & J. B. Villa, 1841; Theodoxus parreyssii A. & J. B. Villa, 1841; Theodoxus ticinensis A. & J. B. Villa, 1841; Theodoxus zebrina Récluz, 1841; Theodoxus mittreana Récluz, 1842; Theodoxus doriae Issel, 1865; Theodoxus reynesiana Dubreuil, 1869; Theodoxus brauneri Lindholm, 1908 – or as separate species; Theodoxus brauneri f. lacrymans Lindholm, 1908; Theodoxus brauneri f. alboguttata Lindholm, 1908; Theodoxus brauneri f. pulherrima Lindholm, 1908; Theodoxus dniestroviensis Put, 1972; Theodoxus velox Anistratenko, 1999

= Theodoxus fluviatilis =

Species of gastropod

Theodoxus fluviatilis, common name the river nerite, is a species of small freshwater and brackish water snail with a gill and an operculum, an aquatic gastropod mollusk in the family Neritidae, the nerites.

This widely distributed neritid snail species occurs from Europe to Central Asia. It has a thick shell with a calcified operculum. The coloration pattern on the shell is very variable. Theodoxus fluviatilis lives in freshwater and in brackish water, in rivers and lakes on stones. It feeds mainly by grazing on biofilms and diatoms.

Some of the populations of this species are spreading, and these can reach densities up to thousands of snails per square meter. Females lay egg capsules, each of which contains a large number of eggs, but only one snail hatches from the capsule. The snails reach sexual maturity in a year, and the total lifespan is 2 or 3 years.

== Taxonomy ==
Theodoxus fluviatilis was originally described under the name Nerita fluviatilis by Carl Linnaeus in 1758. Linnaeus' original text (the type description) in Latin was very short, and reads as follows:

Nerita fluviatilis, n. 632: testa rugosa, labiis edentilis. Habitat in Europa cataractis.

Which means in English: "Nerita fluviatilis, number 632: the shell is wrinkled, there are no teeth in the aperture. It inhabits rivers in Europe." Later, this species was moved to the genus Theodoxus Montfort, 1810. Theodoxus fluviatilis is in fact the type species of the genus Theodoxus. Anistratenko and colleagues designated the lectotype for Theodoxus fluviatilis in 1999 (an English translation was published by Anistratenko in 2005).

=== Subspecies ===
Several subspecies of Theodoxus fluviatilis were described and (inconsistently) recognized by various authors:

- Theodoxus fluviatilis fluviatilis (Linnaeus, 1789) – was described from a freshwater environment
- Theodoxus fluviatilis fluviatilis f. fontinalis Brard, 1815 – is sometimes considered as a synonym of Theodoxus fluviatilis
- Theodoxus fluviatilis littoralis (Linnaeus, 1789) – was described from brackish water by Linnaeus as a separate species, originally named Nerita littoralis. A study by Zettler (2008) proved that its status as a subspecies is unjustified, being regarded as a synonym of Theodoxus fluviatilis. Although these so-called forms (form fluviatilis and form littoralis) differ in morphology, ecology, reproductive strategy and behaviour, they are probably just ecomorphs.
- Theodoxus fluviatilis sardous (Menke, 1830)
- Theodoxus fluviatilis subthermalis Issel, 1865 – or Theodoxus subthermalis (Bourguignat in Issel, 1865)
- Theodoxus fluviatilis thermalis (Dupuy, 1851)
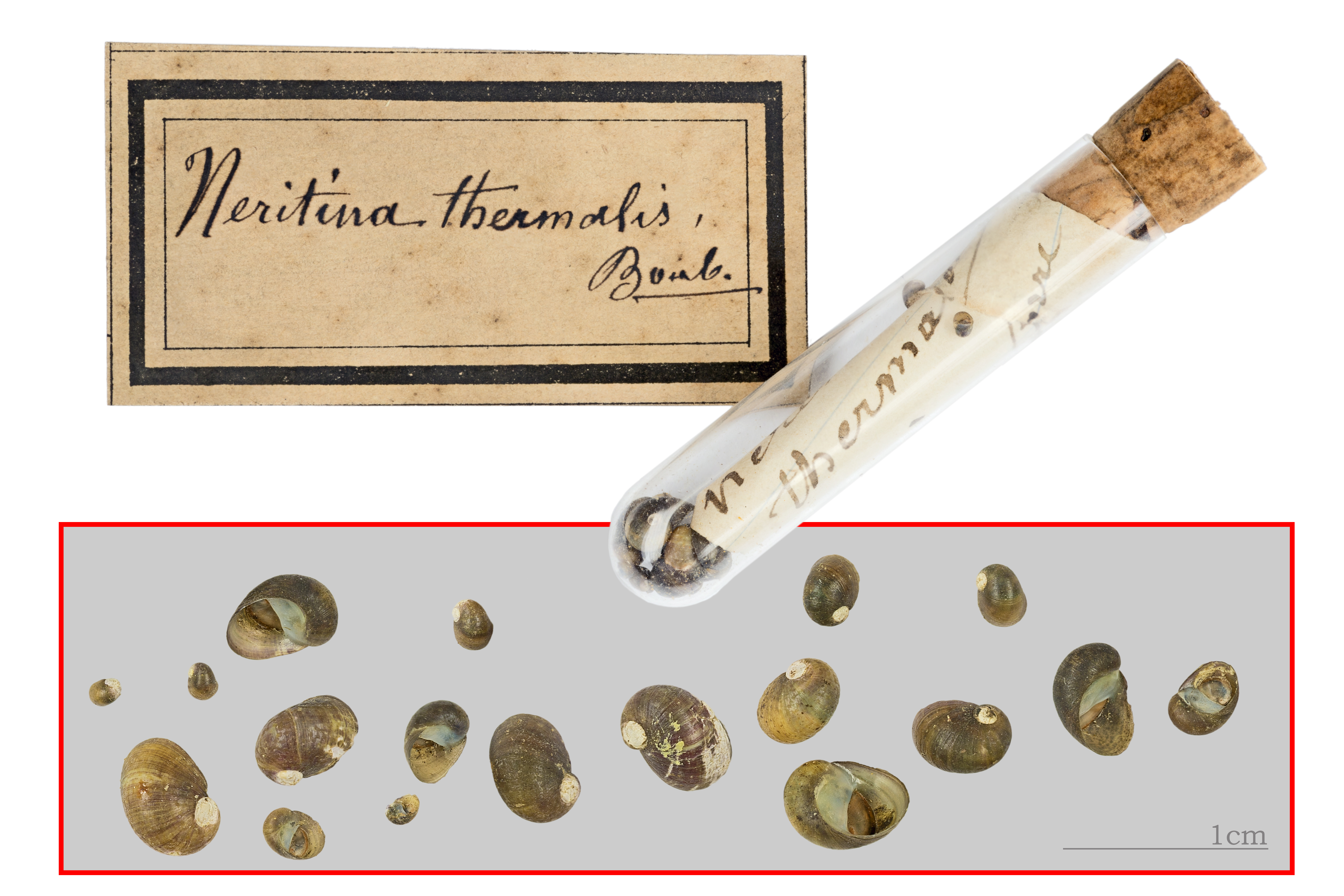
  Syntypes of Theodoxus fluviatilis thermalis at MHNT
- Theodoxus fluviatilis transversetaeniatus A. J. Wagner, 1928
- Theodoxus fluviatilis dalmaticus Sowerby – in Lake Ohrid
- Theodoxus fluviatilis euxinus (Clessin, 1885) – has been considered to be a subspecies (see Theodoxus euxinus)

Bunje (2005) does not consider Theodoxus velox Anistratenko, 1999 to be a distinct species from Theodoxus fluviatilis.

=== Cladogram ===
A cladogram shows the phylogenic relationships within the genus Theodoxus:

- Theodoxus
  - - - - clade A: Theodoxus anatolicus, Theodoxus jordani, and Theodoxus macrii
        - - clade C: Theodoxus danubialis and Theodoxus prevostianus
          - clade B: Theodoxus fluviatilis and Theodoxus euxinus
      - clade D: Theodoxus baeticus, Theodoxus valentina, Theodoxus meridionalis
    - clade F: Theodoxus peloponnesa
  - clade E: Theodoxus transversalis

This cladogram shows that the sister group to clade B is clade C. They split in 5–11.5 Ma, when Lake Pannon existed. Theodoxus species living in brackish water include Theodoxus fluviatilis and Theodoxus jordani, but they are apparently not closely related.

== Distribution ==
The exact type locality for this species is unknown, but it is probably the Main river in Southern Germany. Glöer (2002) considered the type locality sensu Linnaeus as "Habitat in fluviis, Upsaliae ad molendinam Ulvam & alibi", but this would suggest a brackish water environment. The distribution of this species was considered to be European, but in reality the species occurs in the western to central Palaearctic. Its occurrence is scattered throughout Europe and in Western Asia except for the Alps and the regions immediately north of the Alps. This species does not live in Norway or Siberia. Theodoxus fluviatilis has the most widespread distribution of all of the species in the genus Theodoxus. It is in fact one of the most widely distributed species in the entire family Neritidae.

This species is threatened mainly by river engineering and water pollution in densely populated regions. The species' population trend is overall stable, but is declining in some areas (Germany), while in other areas it is expanding (for example in the Danube river). In the Rhine river during the 1970s, Theodoxus fluviatilis came close to local extinction because of water pollution. Subsequently, the water quality improved for more than two decades, leading to a recovery. Even so, the species became extinct in the Rhine for an unknown reason in the late 1990s. Since 2006, Theodoxus fluviatilis recolonized the Rhine, probably via ship transport through the Main-Danube Canal. An analysis based on cytochrome-c oxidase I (COI) gene has shown that the recolonization probably originated in the Danube.

=== Europe ===
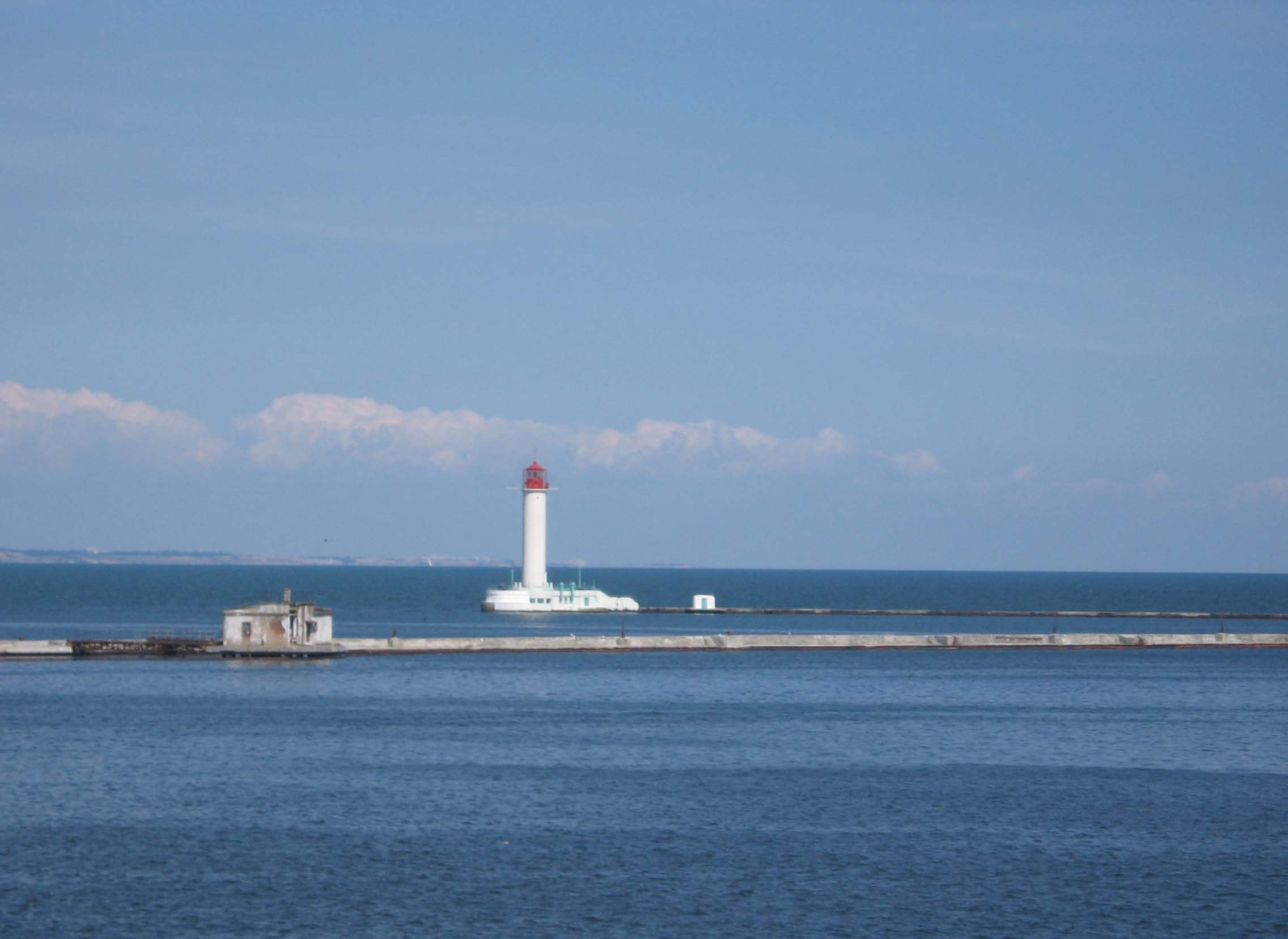
The Gulf of Odesa is one of the locations where Theodoxus fluviatilis is known to occur.

The species occurs widely in Western Europe, and it is also widespread in the north of Ireland, living in 10% of Irish streams and rivers. It lives in Great Britain, including the Orkney Islands, as well as in the Netherlands, Belgium, Luxembourg, Liechtenstein, and Monaco. It also is found in France and Switzerland, where it is considered to be critically endangered. More to the south, it occurs in Spain and Portugal, although the species is restricted to karst springs in Central Portugal.

In central Europe, this species has been recently introduced in the Austrian Danube, where it was first recorded in Tulln, Lower Austria in 2001. In the Czech Republic, it is now extinct in Bohemia; the only findings were in the Elbe river near Litoměřice in 1917, and the most recent findings of empty shells took place in 1943. Theodoxus fluviatilis also occurs in Poland, in Slovakia where it is non-indigenous since 2002, and in Hungary. Zettler (2008) provided a detailed bibliography of the distribution of T. fluviatilis in Germany. The indigenous distribution of T. fluviatilis included all of the large rivers: Rhine, Main, Moselle, Neckar, Weser, Elbe and Oder. However, this species is now highly endangered in Germany (Stark gefährdet).

In Northern Europe, this species is found in Denmark, in Sweden as far north as 58° N. It can also be found on the coasts of Finland, in Åland, and is known to be found alive there since 1994. No other Theodoxus species reaches the Baltic Sea. It has the northernmost distribution of the genus Theodoxus and it is also the northernmost species of all Neritidae. In Eastern Europe this snail occurs in Estonia, Lithuania, and Latvia, as well as Belarus, and in Russia from western Russia to Caucasus. Since 1997 it has been found in the Gulf of Odesa, Ukraine. In Ukraine and in Crimea it is non-indigenous, and was first recorded in the area in 1955. It also occurs in Moldova. In Southern Europe, Theodoxus fluviatilis lives in Albania, Bosnia and Herzegovina, Romania, Bulgaria, Slovenia, and Croatia. In Macedonia and Albania it occurs in Lake Ohrid (which spans the border of the two countries) as the subspecies Theodoxus fluviatilis dalmaticus. It is found on the mainland of Greece and also on Crete. It is known to occur in the mainland of Italy and also in Sardinia. It occurs in Montenegro, and in Serbia.

=== Asia and Africa ===
In Asia, Theodoxus fluviatilis is found in Turkey. It can also be found in Iran, in the provinces of Kerman, Gilan, Mazandaran, Fars, Hormozgan, Lorestan and Khorasan. However, until 2012, all the records from Iran were listed as Theodoxus doriae. In Africa this species occurs in Algeria, and possibly (or probably) in Morocco, where there are records which some authors consider to be reliable. However, instead of one species, Theodoxus fluviatilis, Brown (1994) recognized three species in northwestern Africa: Theodoxus numidicus, Theodoxus maresi, Theodoxus meridionalis.

=== Prehistoric biogeography ===
Shells of Theodoxus fluviatilis have been found in an Upper Paleolithic archaeological site in the cave Caldeirão, Pedreira (Tomar), Tomar Municipality, Portugal, and also in a site from about 6000 years B.P. of Litorina age on the Åland Islands. Shells from the Late Neolithic have been found in Divoká Šárka, Czech Republic. Bunje (2005) hypothetized that the ancestral range of Theodoxus fluviatilis was the Ponto-Pannonian region (southern Ukraine, Romania and Hungary). Bunje suggested that the species first colonized northern Italy, Greece and Turkey; in the second phase it colonized Spain, France and Germany; and finally in the Holocene it colonized the British Isles, Sweden and the Baltic Sea. In 2002, German malacologist Peter Glöer summarized the distribution of this species during the Pleistocene and Holocene epochs.

== Description ==
The shell of Theodoxus fluviatilis is somewhat depressed (with an usually low spire), strongly calcified, and has 3–3.5 whorls (including the protoconch). Larger specimens are usually eroded. The width of an adult shell is usually 5–9 mm, but can reach up to 11–13 mm. The height of the shell is 4–6.5 mm, or up to 7 mm. These mean values vary among populations depending on the environment: the maximum width of the shell of brackish water populations is 9.3 mm. Brackish water shells are somewhat shorter, reaching up to 5.8 mm, and the maximum weight of the shell is 124 mg. In freshwater populations, the maximum recorded shell width is 13.1 mm, and maximum height is 9.3 mm. The maximum weight of freshwater shells is 343 mg.

The exterior of the shell is basically whitish or yellowish, with a net-like dark reddish or violet pattern. This pattern is very variable (depending on environmental factors), sometimes partly presenting bands, and even occasionally being evenly dark. The shell is very variable in color and color patterns, showing great polymorphism. Shell coloration and patterns are very plastic in all species of the genus Theodoxus and these qualities may be influenced by factors like ionic composition of water, type of substratum and nutrition of individuals in various habitats. Zettler and colleagues (2004) showed that in the outer coastal waters of the Baltic Sea, the nearly black and often corroded shell form of Theodoxus fluviatilis is predominant, whereas in the inner (sheltered) parts of coastal waters, yellowish-green forms prevail. Glöer and Pešić (2015) observed that specimens from a darker stony substrate were black or dark brown. Shells of specimens of Theodoxus fluviatilis from Northern Europe are ornamented with a pattern of white, drop-like spots on a dark or red background. Specimens from South France and Spain are ornamented with a pattern of zigzag stripes, while specimens from the Balkans show all possible combinations of white drop-like spots and zigzag stripes. Animals from lacustrine habitats show dark or light bands on the shell.

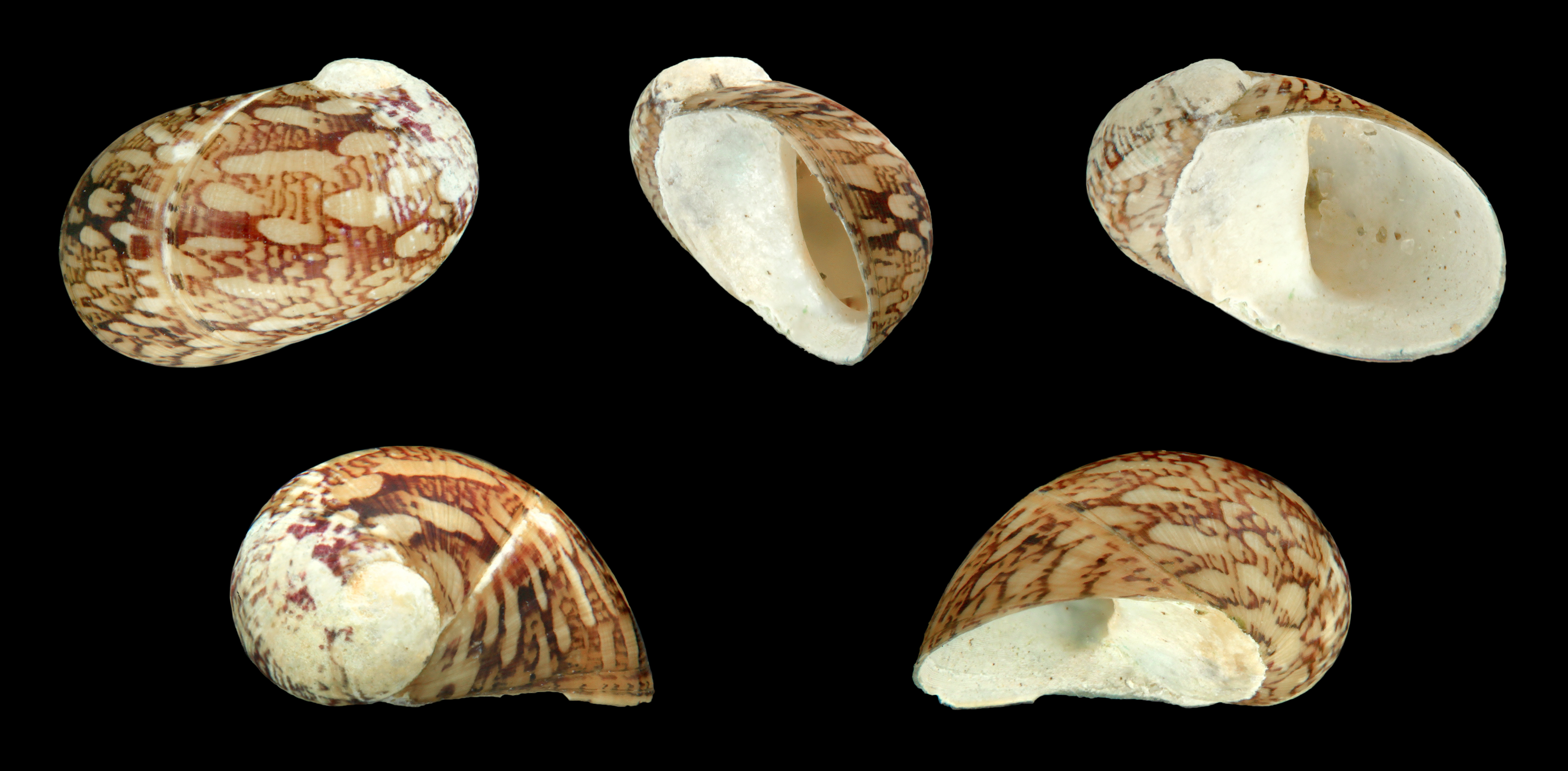
Theodoxus fluviatilis littoralis

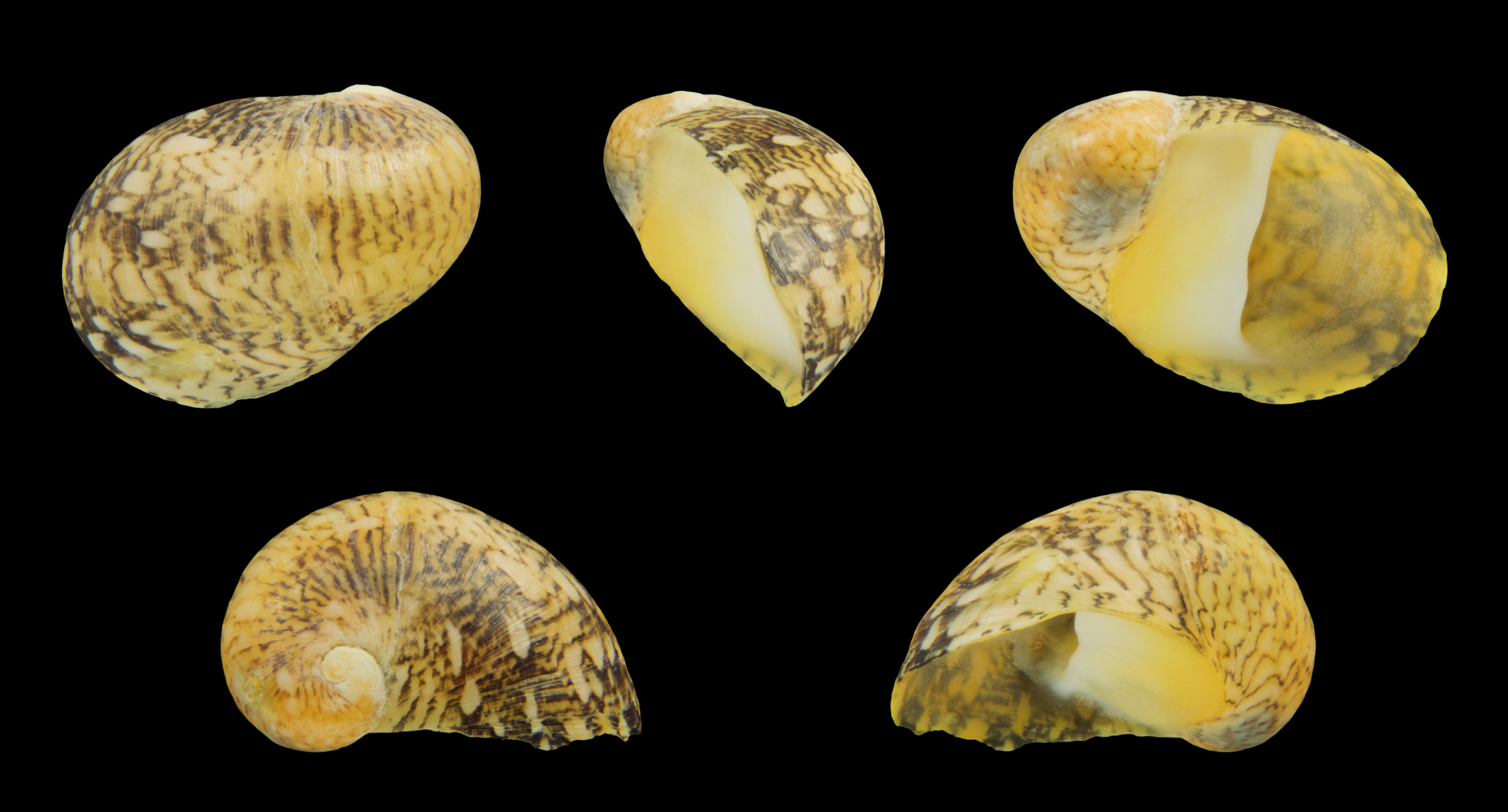
Theodoxus fluviatilis dalmatinus

Images showing variability in the color patterns of shells of Theodoxus fluviatilis:

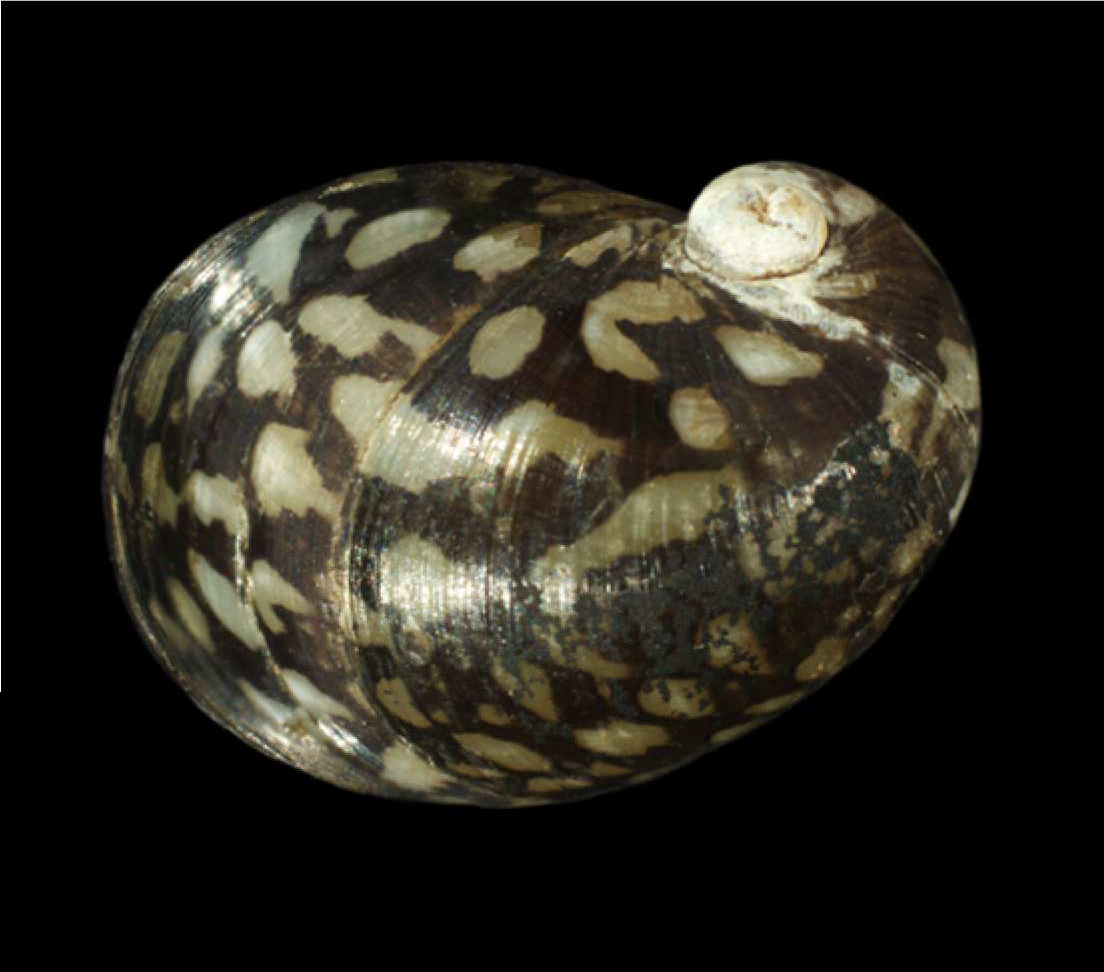
From Alster, Germany.

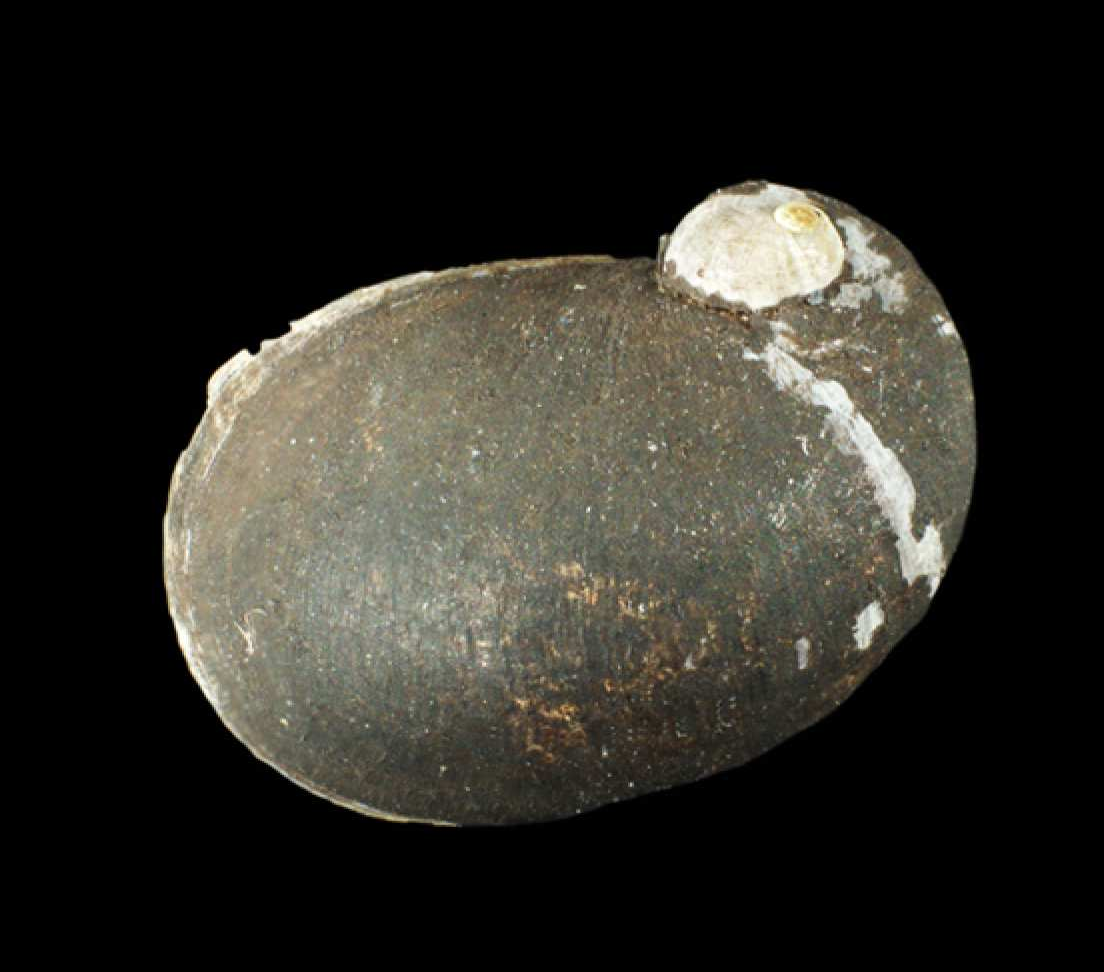
From Güstrow, Germany.

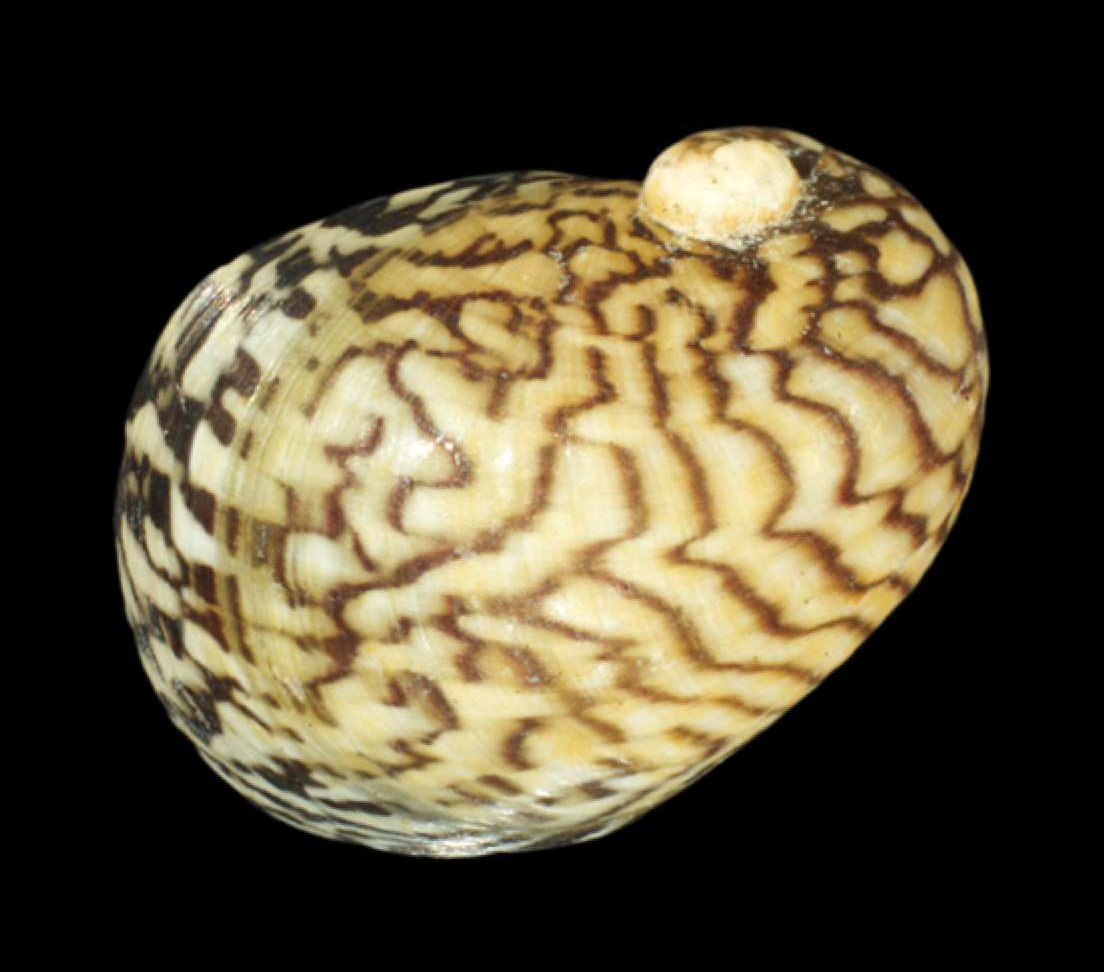
From Zeta River, Montenegro.

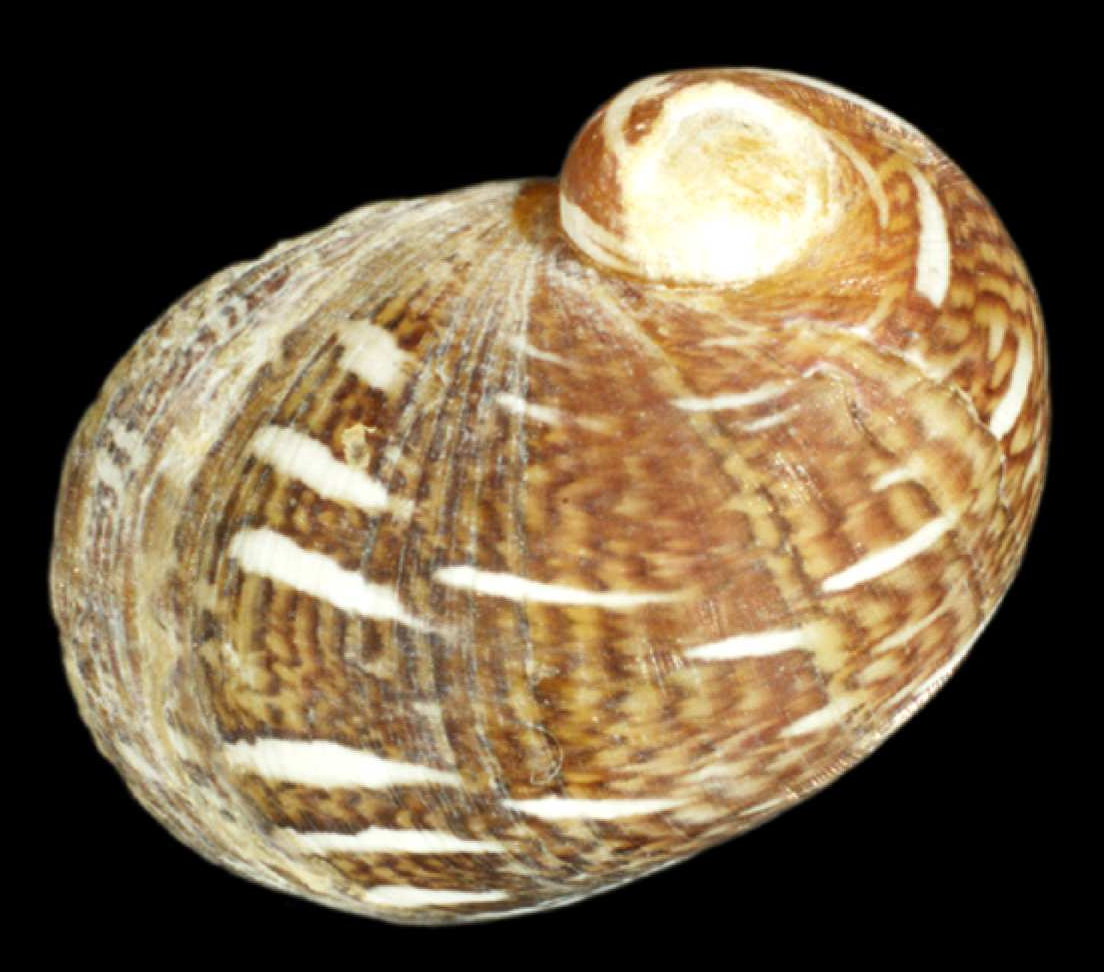
From Neretva River, Bosnia and Herzegovina.

The shell shape of Theodoxus fluviatilis is similar to that of Theodoxus transversalis. The shell shape of Theodoxus danubialis is more spherical. The shape of the aperture of Theodoxus prevostianus is usually descending. However, all of these species display a large morphological plasticity, which makes them difficult to differentiate. The overall outline of the shell is still used for species identification in recent malacological literature. Though the coloration and patterns of the shells cannot be relied upon to identify specimens, opercular characters can be used for a proper identification of Theodoxus fluviatilis. The calcified operculum of T. fluviatilis is D-shaped, light reddish with a red margin, bearing a broad rib (also called a ridge) on its inner surface. The columellar muscle is attached to the rib. The rib is long and thin, attenuated at the base, while the callus is thin; a peg is lacking. The characteristic features of the operculum are already visible in juveniles. There is sexual dimorphism on the border of the rib shield of the operculum, which is straight in females, but curved in males.

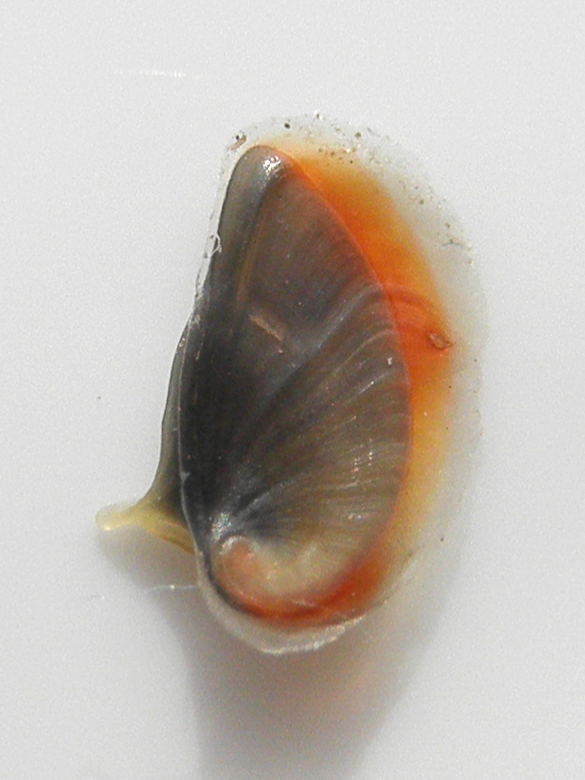
The outer side of an operculum.

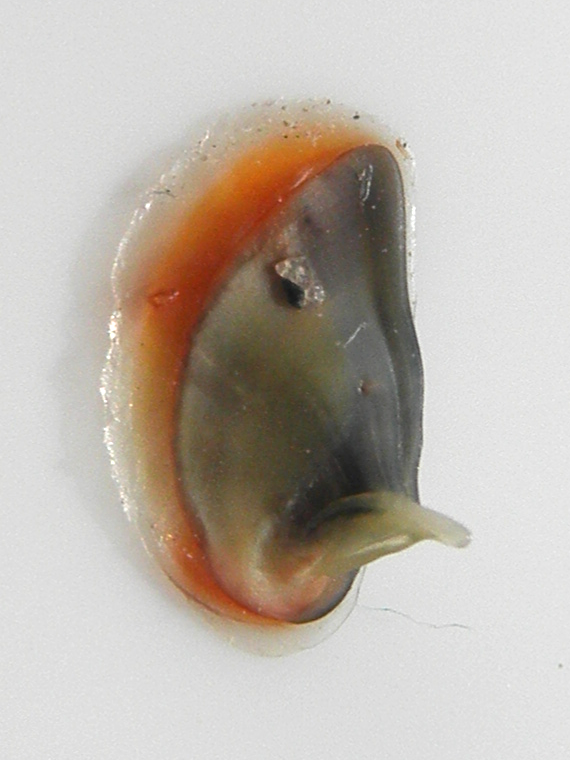
The inner side of the same operculum.

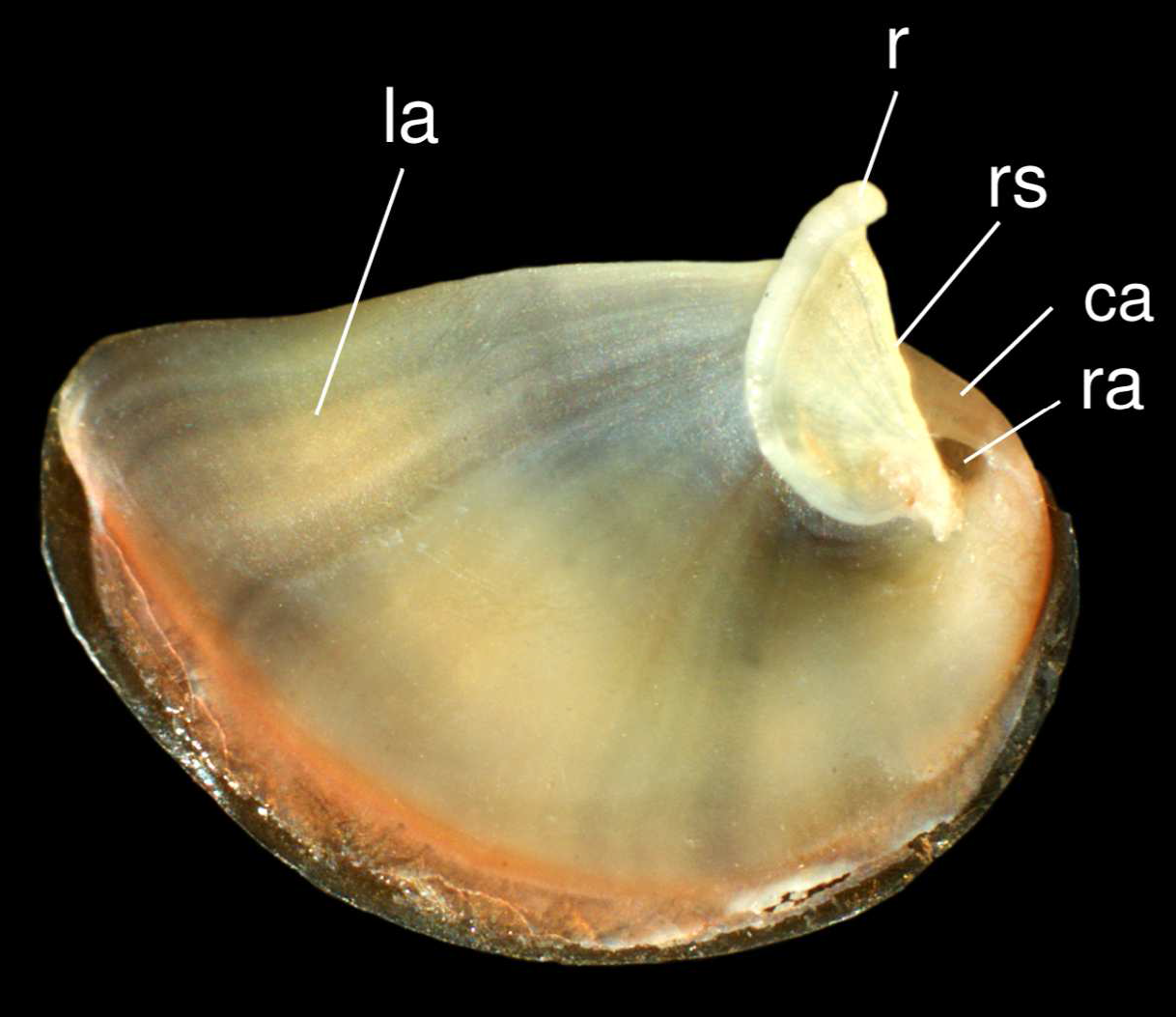
The inner side of another operculum: la – left adductor, r – rib, rs – rib shield, ca – callus, ra – right adductor.

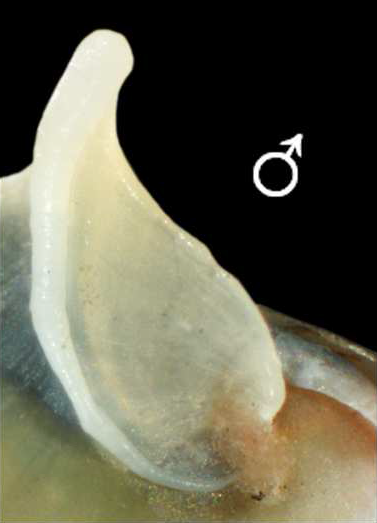
The rib shield of a male.

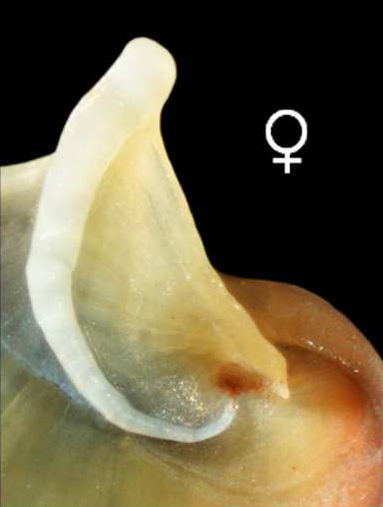
The rib shield of a female.

Aberrations in the shape of operculum have been observed. In a specimen from Vouvant in France, and another from a spring near Bar in Montenegro, a double rib was present, but the rib shield was reduced; in a specimen from Ohrid Lake, only the rib shield was reduced. Theodoxus fluviatilis can be distinguished from the other three mentioned species by having a rib pit, which is formed by the rib and the rib shield. The rib shield, and consequently a rib pit, are lacking in Theodoxus transversalis, Theodoxus danubialis and Theodoxus prevostianus. These three species differs in having, in addition to a rib, a peg, which is absent in T. fluviatilis. The visible soft parts of the animal are light yellow with a black head. The tentacles are greyish and long. The eyes are large and black; the foot is whitish.

=== Radula ===
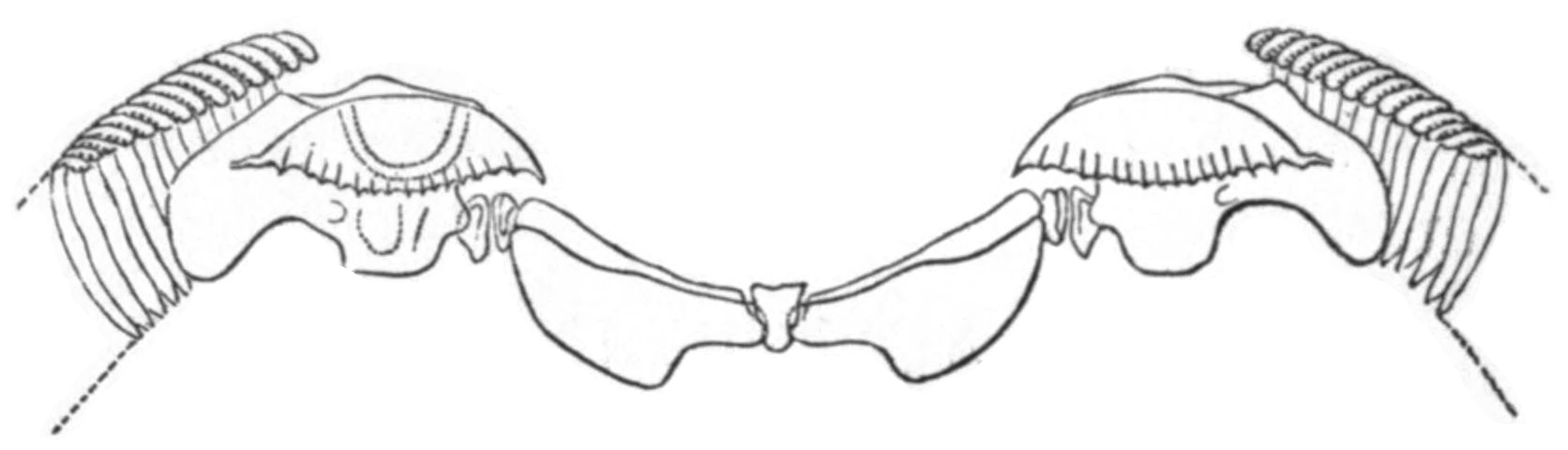
A drawing depicting a single row of teeth in the radula of Theodoxus fluviatilis

Theodoxus fluviatilis, like all other species in the family Neritidae, has a radula which is of the rhipidoglossan type (a radula with many small marginal teeth which help "brush" food particles into the gullet). Zettler and colleagues (2004) and Zettler (2008) made SEM micrographs of the radula of this species.

=== Reproductive system ===
Theodoxus fluviatilis has separate sexes (i.e. these snails are dioecious). The diploid number of chromosomes (2n) is 25 in males and 26 in females. There is X0 sex-determination system in Neritidae, and it was confirmed for this species too.

Females have two openings located under the edge of the mantle in the mantle cavity: the opening of the vagina and an opening for laying eggs. The vagina accepts the sperm during copulation. The vagina is connected to the bursa copulatrix and to the spermatheca (for storing sperm). The other opening is for laying eggs. Egg cells originate in the ovary. Egg cells travel through the oviduct to the fertilization chamber, where fertilization occur. Eggs then develop in the glandular uterus. A capsule is formed in the diverticulum next to the uterus. The eggs are then laid.

In males, the semen is forming in the testis. The sperm structure of Theodoxus fluviatilis was examined by Gustaf Retzius. Then semen travels through the prostate, where it mixes with prostatic fluid. Finally it goes through the vas deferens to the penis. The penis is located on the inner side of the right tentacle. The following illustrations show the reproductive system in the female and in the male:

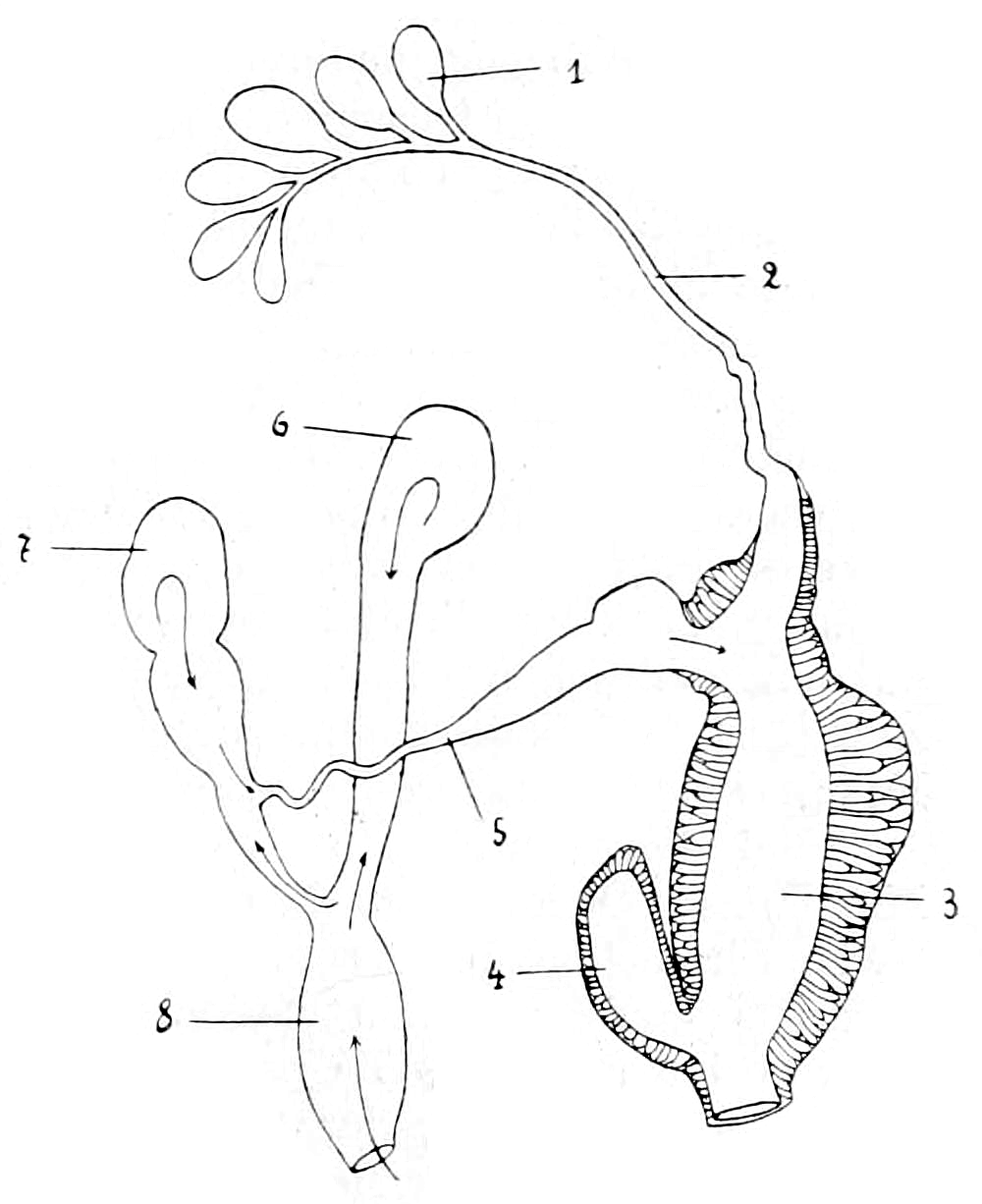
Drawing of the female reproductive system of the species, as first described (correctly) by Gustave Gilson (1896) showing: 1 – ovarium 2 – oviduct 3 – uterus 4 – diverticulum 5 – connection between bursa copulatrix and uterus 6 – receptaculum seminis 7 – bursa copulatrix 8 – vagina.

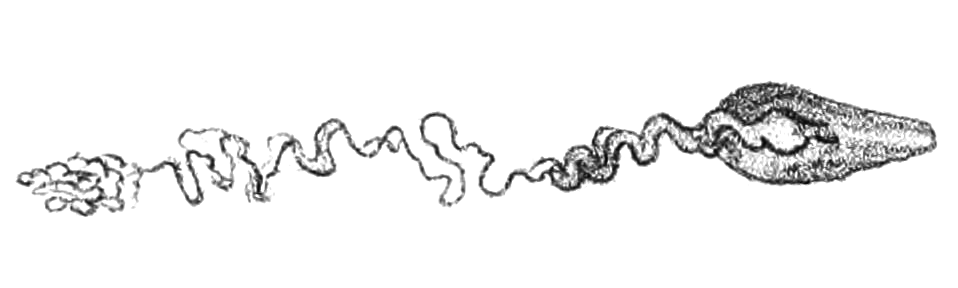
A drawing of the male reproductive system of T. fluviatilis by Lehmann (1873), shows testis (on the left), prostate, vas deferens and penis (on the right).

=== Various organ systems ===
Circulatory system: The osmotic pressure of the hemolymph of Theodoxus fluviatilis is 95 mOsm. That is much lower value than in marine snails in the subfamily Neritinae. The osmotic pressure and the composition of ionts of the hemolymph of the subfamily Neritininae (where does the Theodoxus belong to) is similar to the hemolymph of the land snail family Helicinidae.

== Ecology ==
=== Habitat ===
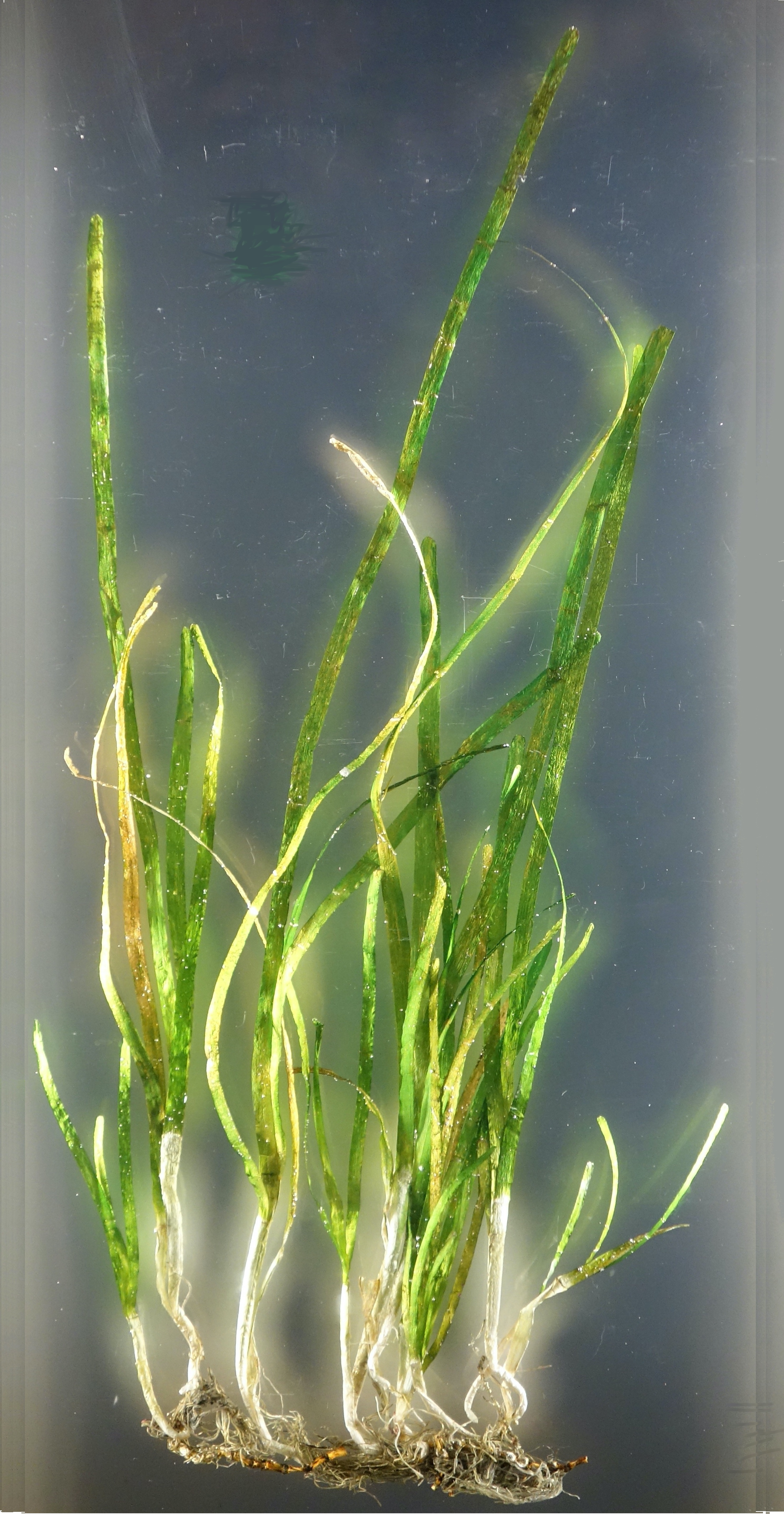
Some populations of T. fluviatilis use the seagrass Zostera marina as a habitat in brackish water environments.

Theodoxus fluviatilis prefers lowland habitats (in Switzerland it occurs up to 275 m a.s.l.) and calcium-rich waters. This small snail inhabits the central and lower parts of rivers (up to 13 m deep), including in brackish water in tidal rivers of estuaries. It sometimes lives in lakes on unvegetated bottoms. Rarely, it lives in springs (rheocrenes), in ground water, and in caves. For example, in the Åland Islands, Theodoxus fluviatilis was found living in lakes with a pH of 7.8–8.9. In streams and rivers in Ireland, the species lived in water with a pH of 7.0–8.4.

The species easily attaches itself to stones, which allows it to live in fast-running waters and in wave zone in lakes. The ability of Theodoxus fluviatilis to live in freshwater and also in brackish water demonstrates the phenotypic plasticity of this species. This small snail can live in up to 60 m depth in coastal waters. Brackish water populations can live in salinities of up to 15‰ in the Baltic Sea or up to 18‰ in the Baltic Sea and in Black Sea. Populations from brackish water can tolerate higher salinity than populations from freshwater. Brackish water populations have much higher accumulation of ninhydrin-positive substances in the foot.

This species lives on hard benthic substrates, typically rocks. It lives on pebbles, sometimes on boulders, and rarely on dead wood. It tolerates mild organic pollution, low oxygen content (down to below 2 mg/liter) but it does not tolerate long periods of droughts, or ice. It lives in mesotrophic waters, and sometimes in oligotrophic waters.

Theodoxus fluviatilis serves an indicator species for river monitoring (in Germany); however the spreading populations also have a high tolerance for degraded habitats. Theodoxus fluviatilis has a large phenotypic plasticity: it was found living on stones and on dead wood in freshwater environments; whereas it lives on stones and on Fucus vesiculosus, Potamogeton spp. and Zostera marina in brackish water in the Baltic Sea. The species can also be found on aggregates of Mytilus.

This species, together with the isopod Saduria entomon, have been found to be a dominant part of the fauna biomass in the central and northern Baltic Sea. Brackish water populations can reach densities up to 200–1000 snails per m². Theodoxus fluviatilis dalmaticus in Lake Ohrid can reach population densities up to 6412 snails per m². The species was found in population densities of up to 9000 snails per m² in a spring of the Anços river in Central Portugal, where there is a stable temperature of 15.3–16.6 °C, which allows continuous reproduction in Theodoxus fluviatilis. At Gabčíkovo port, in September 2003, a density of 34,932 juvenile snails per m² was recorded.

=== Feeding habits ===
Theodoxus fluviatilis feeds mainly on diatoms living on stones, scraping biofilms and also consuming detritus. It can also consume Cyanobacteria and green algae as a poor-quality food supply. Cyanobacteria contain toxins and indigestible mucopolysaccharides, and green algae have cellulose in their cell walls (Theodoxus species have no cellulase enzymes to digest cellulose). They also graze on zygotes and germlings of brown alga Fucus vesiculosus, when the alga is small up to 1 mm. Peters and Traunspurger (2012) studied the effect of the grazing of Theodoxus fluviatilis on epilithic meiofauna and algae.

=== Life cycle ===
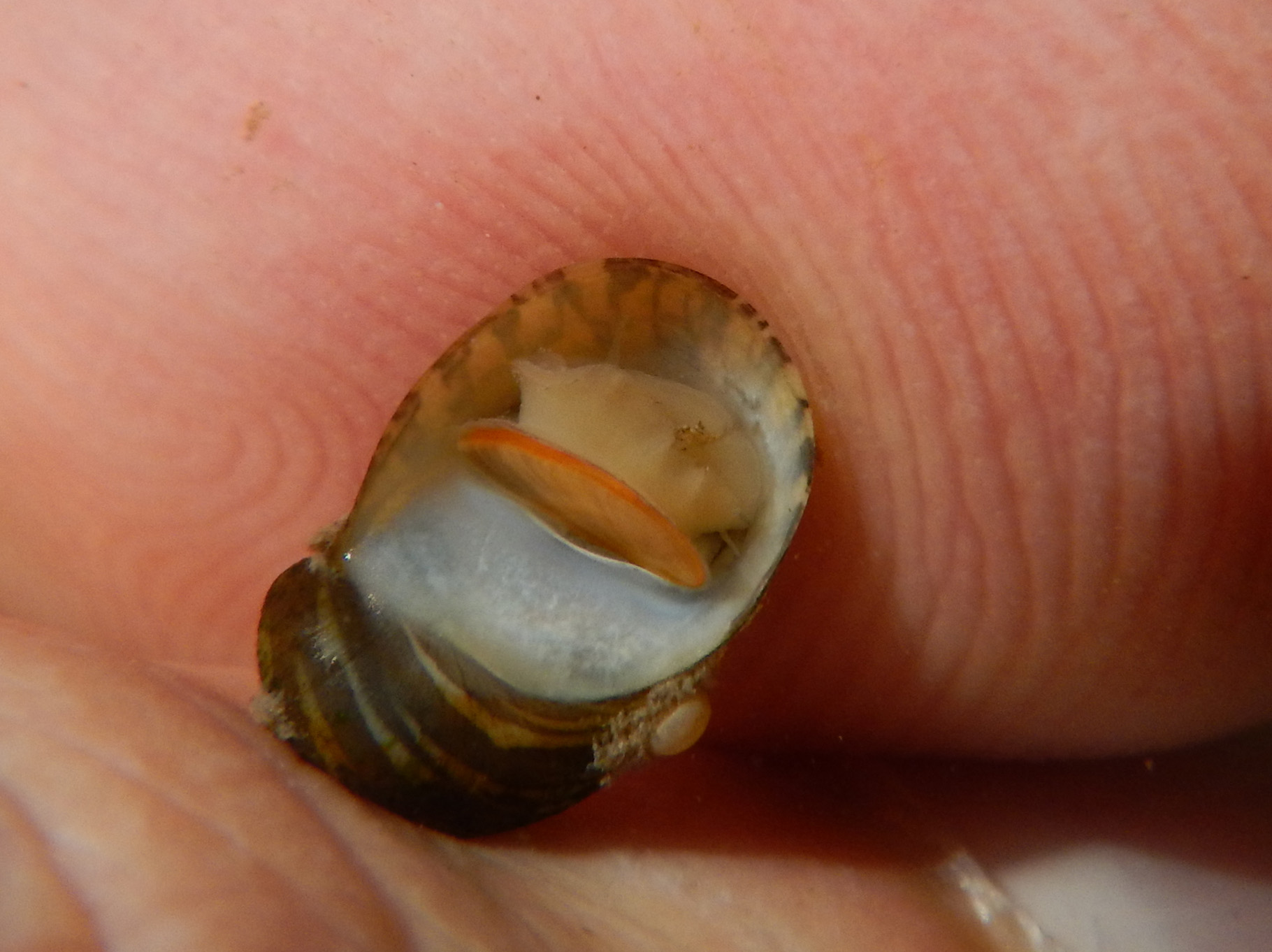
One egg capsule on the surface of a shell of a live Theodoxus fluviatilis.

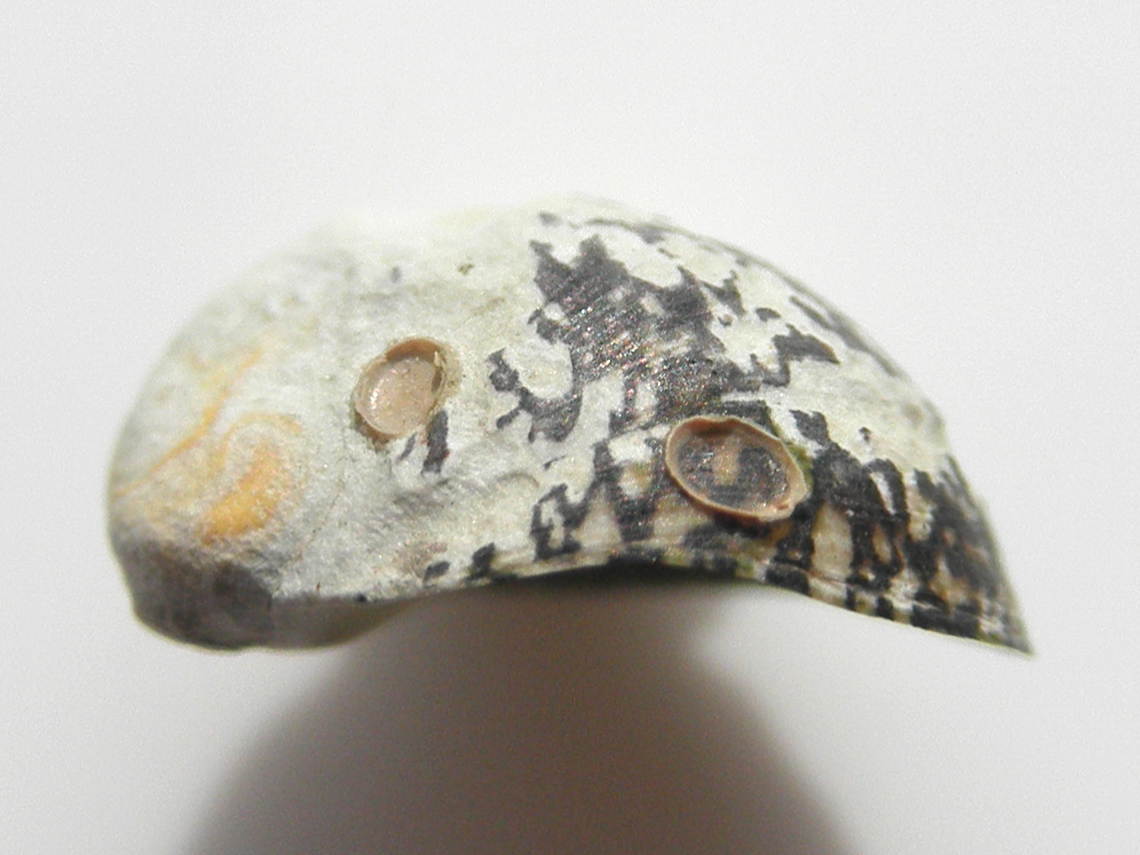
Remnants of two egg capsules are visible on the surface of this corroded shell of Theodoxus fluviatilis. The width of the shell is 8 mm and the height is 6 mm.

Theodoxus fluviatilis is gonochoristic, which means that each individual animal is distinctly male or female, and cross-fertilization can occur. The sex ratio is 1:1. The structure of the flagellum of the spermatozoon is unique: the flagellum is divided into two parts.

T. fluviatilis eggs are usually laid in from mid-April to October, in temperatures above 10 °C. Eggs are laid in egg capsules deposited on stones and sometimes on shells of conspecific individuals. Females usually lay a cluster containing 4–5 capsules. A single female will usually lay about 40 capsules during summer, and about 20 capsules during autumn. Fresh capsules are white, but older capsules become yellow or brown and may bear an epiphytic outer layer. The capsules are around 1 mm in diameter (0.9–1.1 mm), but in brackish water they are usually smaller (about 0.8 mm). Empty (sterile) small capsules (0.5–0.8 mm in diameter) can also be laid. The number of eggs per egg capsule changes depending on the environment. There are 100–200 eggs in each capsule in freshwater, as opposed to 55–80 eggs in each capsule in brackish water. Usually, only one egg develops, with the remaining eggs serving as nutrition for the embryo, which results in a single juvenile snail hatching from each capsule.

Juveniles with a shell length of 0.5–1 mm hatch after 30 days (in 25 °C), or after 65 days (in 20 °C). The ash-free dry weight of newly hatched snails is 0.012 mg. The protoconch has one whorl. Capsules laid in spring hatch after 2–3 months, in August–September. Capsules from late summer overwinter because embryonic development ceases in temperatures below 10 °C, thus these capsules hatch in spring after 7–8 months. The shell grows mainly from May to August; there is no shell growth in winter. The snails reach sexual maturity in less than 1 year, when the shell length is 5.5–5.7 mm.

The life span of T. fluviatilis is 2–3 years. The age of a few snails was estimated to be 3.5 years. The mortality rate is low in summer. However, it is higher in winter because ice and storms can dislocate the substrate, which can result in mechanical damage to the snails.

=== Parasites and predators ===
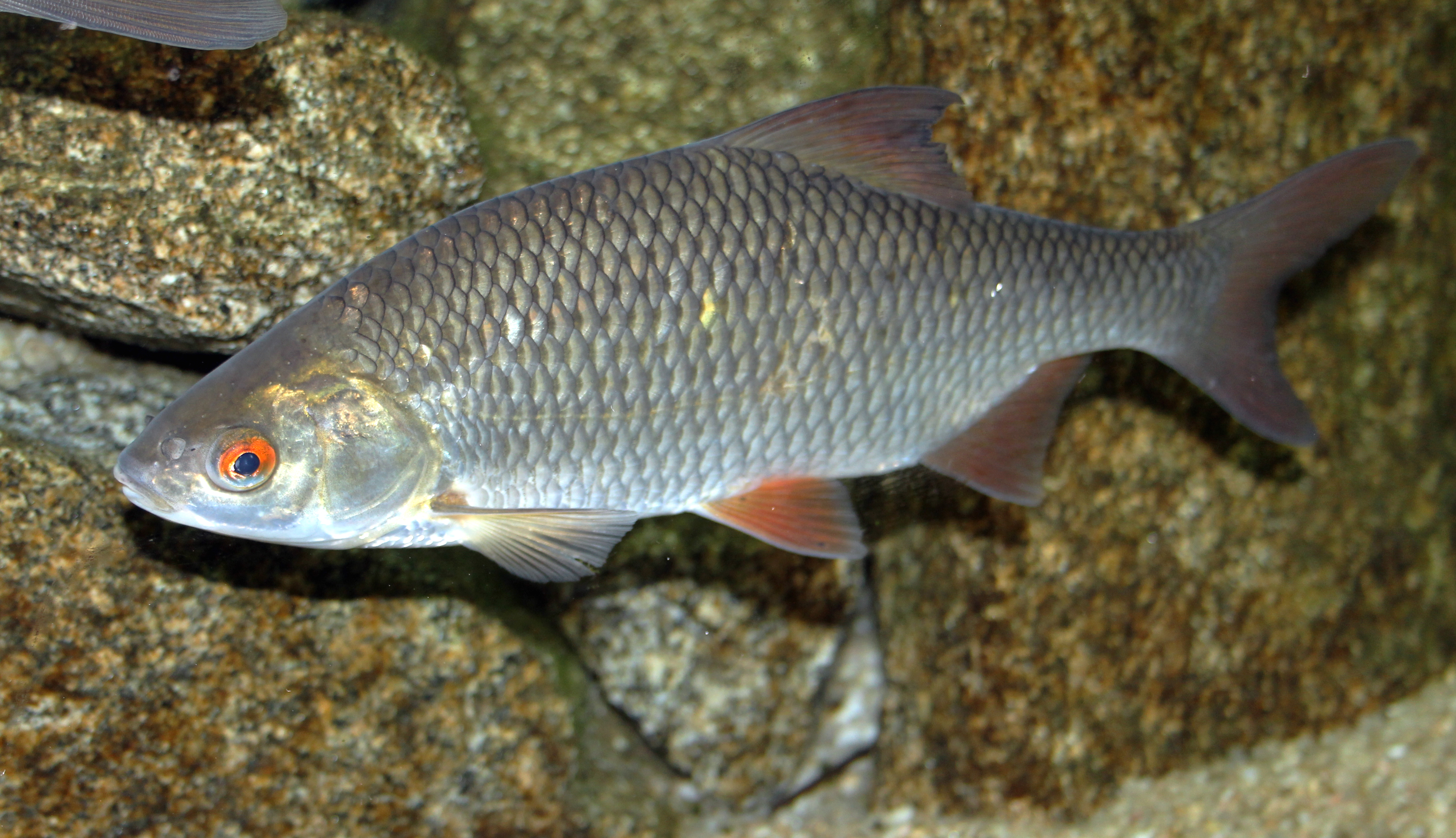
One of the known predators of Theodoxus fluviatilis is the common roach, Rutilus rutilus

Parasites of Theodoxus fluviatilis include several species of trematodes. The snail serves as first intermediate host to Plagioporus skrjabini and as second intermediate host to Cotylurus cornutus. Asymphylodora demeli is also found in this small snail, as is Notocotylus zduni. This small snail is also parasitized by several species of ciliates. It is the main host for the ciliate Trichodina baltica; the snails are usually 100% infected in the mantle cavity Another ciliate found in the mantle cavity is a species of Scyphidia. Two other parasitic ciliate species found in this snail are Protospira mazurica, and Hypocomella quatuor. Predators of Theodoxus fluviatilis include the common roach (a freshwater fish), Rutilus rutilus. Theodoxus fluviatilis is also the prey of some birds.
