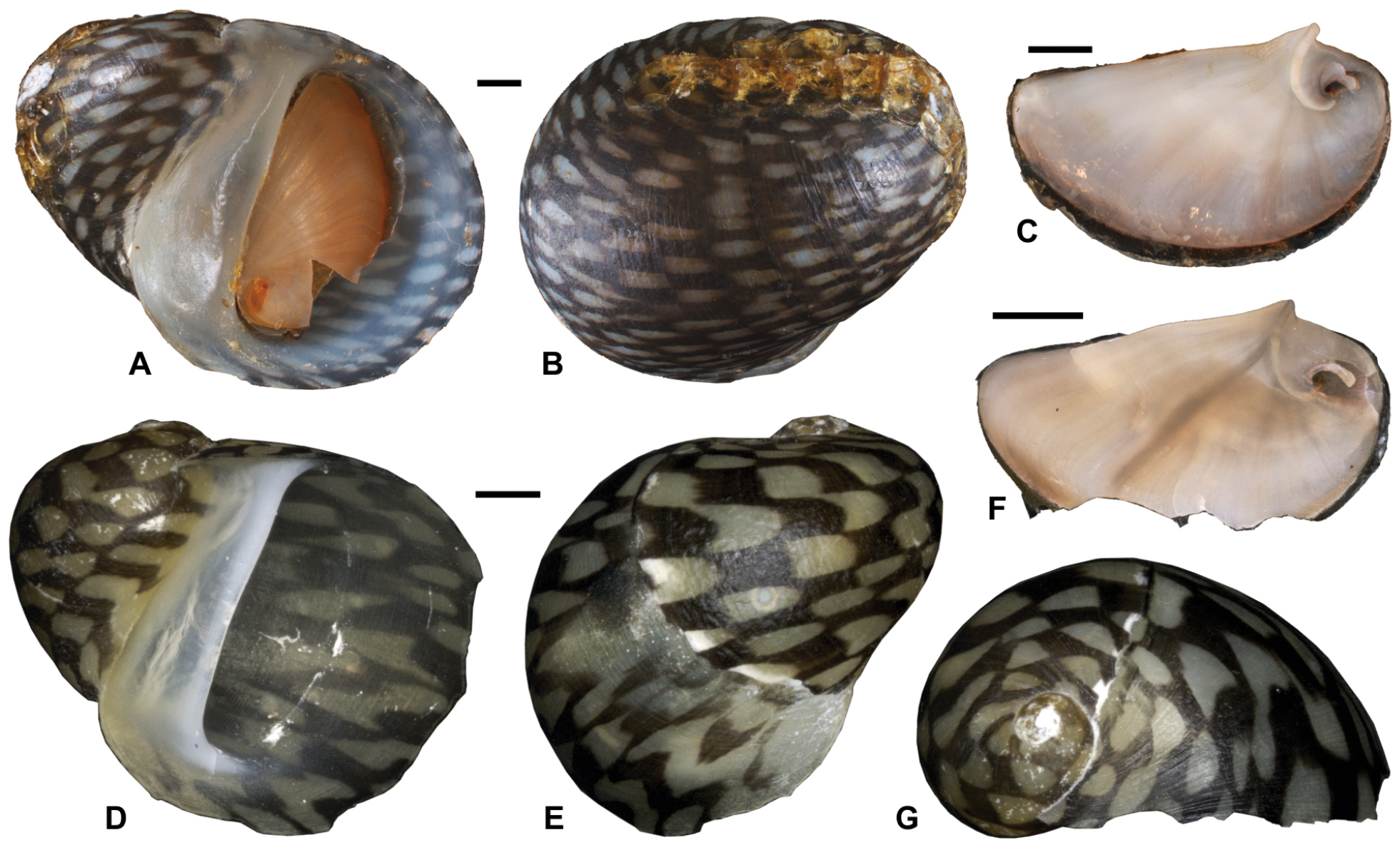
- Shells of Theodoxus altenai

Conservation status
- Critically Endangered (IUCN 3.1)

Scientific classification
- Kingdom: Animalia
- Phylum: Mollusca
- Class: Gastropoda
- Subclass: Neritimorpha
- Order: Cycloneritida
- Family: Neritidae
- Genus: Theodoxus
- Species: T. altenai

Binomial name
- Theodoxus altenai Schütt, 1965

= Theodoxus altenai =

Species of gastropod

Theodoxus altenai is a species of freshwater snail with a gill and an operculum, an aquatic gastropod mollusk in the family Neritidae, the nerites.

== Distribution ==
The distribution of this species includes Antalya Province in southern Turkey.

The type locality is a lake near Döşemealti in Antalya Province, Turkey.

== Description ==
The shell is exceptionally thin, light horny yellowish, translucent and shiny. The Whorls are flat and very rapidly increasing, with a brown quadrangular color pattern. The operculum is reddish, without an apophysis.

The width of the shell is 9.0-10.0 mm. The height of the shell is 6.0 - 7.0 mm.

== Ecology ==
This snail lives in lakes.
