= Theodoxus valentinus =

Conservation status
- Critically Endangered (IUCN 3.1)

Scientific classification
- Kingdom: Animalia
- Phylum: Mollusca
- Class: Gastropoda
- Order: Cycloneritida
- Family: Neritidae
- Genus: Theodoxus
- Species: T. valentinus

Binomial name
- Theodoxus valentinus (Graells, 1846)

Species of gastropod

Theodoxus valentinus is a species of freshwater gastropod in the nerite family, native to natural freshwater channels in Valencia, Spain. This species is extinct. This species was endemic to Spain, where it was originally known from one site on the Río de los Santos in Alcudia de Crespins (Valencia), southeastern Spain. Martínez-Ortí (2014), Martínez-Ortí et al. (2015) and Martínez-Ortí and Osca (2023) consider that the species is extinct. It has never been cited from the Canyoles River, of which the Río de los Santos is a tributary.

Although it was thought that a new subpopulation had been found in the Verd River (Massalavés, Valencia; Martínez-Ortí 2011), the results of molecular study found these records to correspond to Theodoxus meridionalis (Bunje and Lindberg 2007, Martínez-Ortí 2014, Martinez-Ortí et al. 2015, Martínez-Ortí and Osca 2023).

== Description ==
T. valentinus has a globose shell with four whorls, the last of which occupies much of the shell, and well-developed columnar callosity. The deep groove of the largest whorl and the wavy form of its aperture distinguish it from other Spanish Theodoxus. The shell is highly variable in color, though mostly ranging from deep purple to bright red, with striped and solidly-decorated forms.

== Ecology and threats ==
T. valentinus requires highly oxygenated water with a high calcium content of a temperature ranging between 16 and 18 °C; this specialization makes this species highly susceptible to water pollution and changes in environmental conditions such as drought and water extraction. Its susceptibility to habitat loss has paired with damage from invasive species. The species was highly abundant in the original sites until the 1980s, when the species faced significant declines which have not slowed. The species is now only known from three sites along a 10 x 2 km stretch of the Rio Verdu, extirpated from its original Los Santos River habitat. This species is listed as Critically Endangered on the IUCN Red List.

T. valentinus lays many oval-shaped eggs 0.8–1 mm in diameter on hard substrates (those on which it feeds) of which only one hatches. Reproduction occurs throughout the year. T. valentinus is predated actively upon by ostracods. Longevity among T. valentinus ranges from 17.8 to 22 months.
