= Theodoxus subthermalis =

Conservation status
- Least Concern (IUCN 3.1)

Scientific classification
- Kingdom: Animalia
- Phylum: Mollusca
- Class: Gastropoda
- Order: Cycloneritida
- Family: Neritidae
- Genus: Theodoxus
- Species: T. subthermalis

Binomial name
- Theodoxus subthermalis (Bourguignat in Issel, 1865)

Species of gastropod

Theodoxus subthermalis is a species of a freshwater snail with an operculum, an aquatic gastropod mollusk in the family Neritidae, the nerites.

== Taxonomy ==
This taxon was originally described as Theodoxus fluviatilis var. subthermalis.

== Distribution ==
This species occurs in:

- Georgia
- South European Russia
