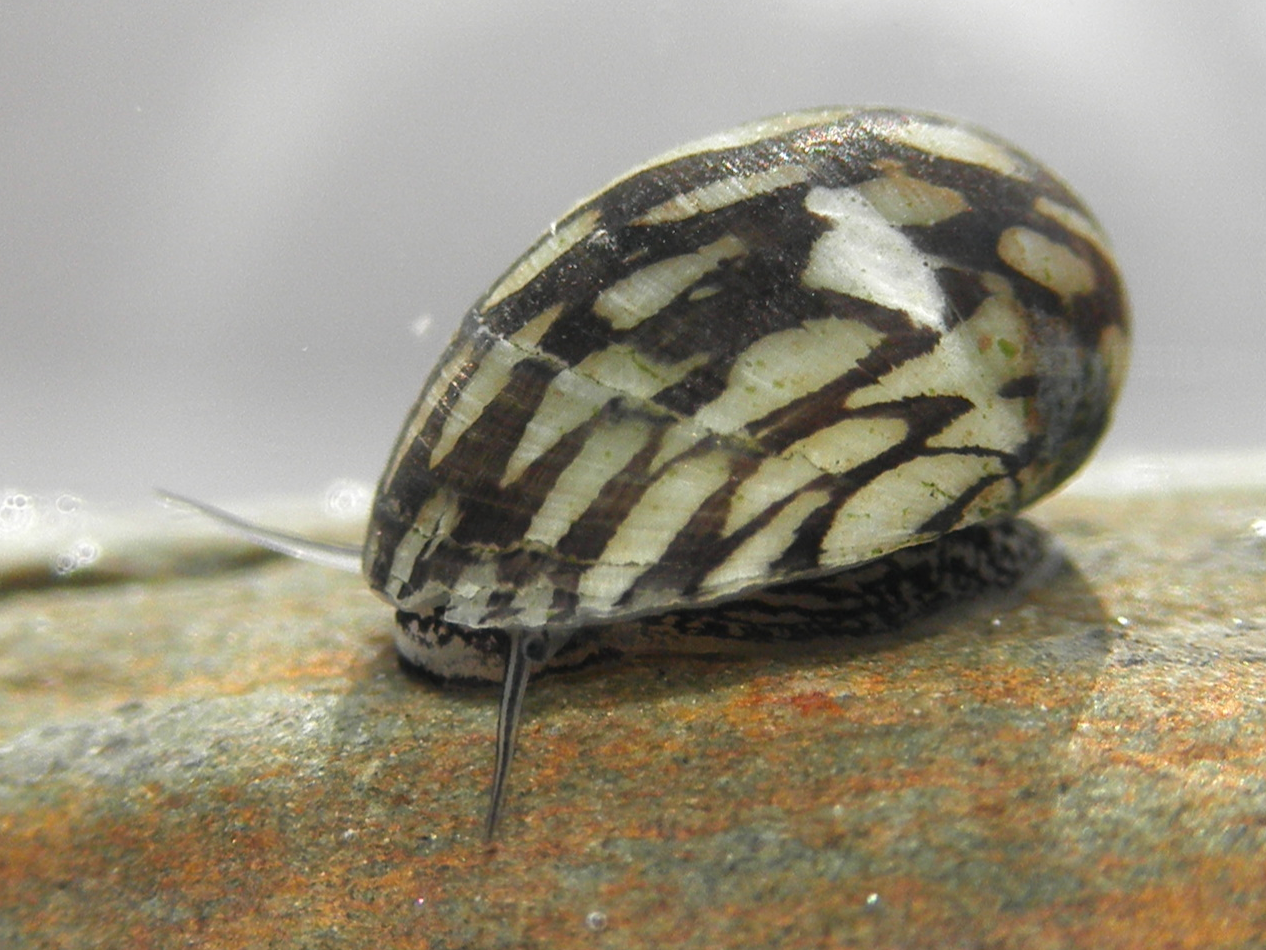
- An oblique left side view of a live Theodoxus fluviatilis

Scientific classification
- Kingdom: Animalia
- Phylum: Mollusca
- Class: Gastropoda
- Order: Cycloneritida
- Superfamily: Neritoidea
- Family: Neritidae
- Subfamily: Neritinae
- Genus: Theodoxus; Montfort, 1810

Type species
- Theodoxus lutetianus Montfort, 1810

Synonyms
- † Brusinaella Andrusov, 1912; † Calvertia Bourguignat, 1881; † Meganinnia Davitashvili, 1930 ·; Nerita (Theodoxus) Montfort, 1810; Neritina Montfort, 1810; Neritina (Neritaea) J. R. Roth, 1855; Neritina (Neritodonta) Brusina, 1884 (junior synonym); Neritina (Theodoxia) Bourguignat, 1877 (unjustified emendation); Neritina (Theodoxus) Montfort, 1810; Neritoconus Kobelt, 1871; Neritodonta Brusina, 1884 (junior synonym); Neritonyx Andrusov, 1912; Ninnia Brusina, 1903; Neritoglobus Kobelt, 1871; † Ninniopsis Tomlin, 1930 (original rank); † Pettretinia Bourguignat, 1881 (subjective synonym); † Saintsimonia Bourguignat, 1881 (subjective synonym); Theodoxia Bourguignat, 1877 (Invalid: unjustified emendation of Theodoxus); Theodoxis Montfort, 1810 (alternative original spelling, not in use); † Theodoxus (Brusinaella) Andrusov, 1912· accepted, alternate representation; Theodoxus (Calvertia) Bourguignat, 1880· accepted, alternate representation; Theodoxus (Neritaea) J. R. Roth, 1855· accepted, alternate representation; † Theodoxus (Neritonyx) Andrusov, 1912· accepted, alternate representation; † Theodoxus (Ninniopsis) Tomlin, 1930· accepted, alternate representation; Theodoxus (Theodoxus) Montfort, 1810· accepted, alternate representation; † Tripaloia Bourguignat, 1881

= Theodoxus =

Theodoxus Temporal range: Eocene–Recent

Genus of gastropods

Theodoxus is a genus of nerites, small water snails with an operculum, some of which live in freshwater, and some in both freshwater and brackish water, aquatic gastropod mollusks in the family Neritidae, the nerites.

== Distribution ==
The distribution of the genus Theodoxus includes Europe and northern Africa and also extends east to southern Iran. No other species within Neritidae have sympatrical distribution with Theodoxus. The distribution of the genus Theodoxus is an exception within Neritidae, because Neritidae live primarily in the southern hemisphere. Species within Theodoxus are the only Neritidae snails, that live in temperate climate.

Bunje & Lindberg (2007) presented the first phylogenetic hypothesis of the clade Theodoxus. The evolution of the genus Theodoxus was affected by separating of Mediterranean Sea and Paratethys sea in Miocene.

== Description ==
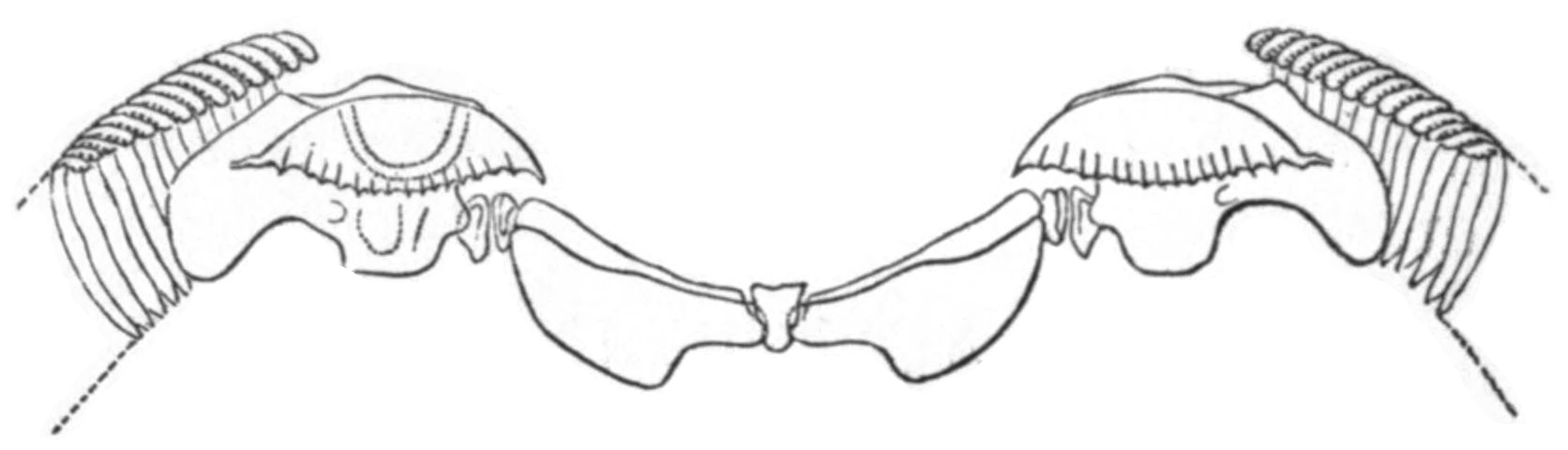
Representative row of radula teeth of T. fluviatilis

The shell in this genus is semiovular with a flat apertural plain. There is no umbilicus. The columella and inner whorls are dissolved.

Species in the genus Theodoxus are highly variable in size, in color pattern of the periostracum, in details of the operculum and in the radula, and all these factors can make identification to species level very challenging.

== Ecology ==
These animals live on stones, and often also under stones, in up to 5–6 m depth or deeper, feeding on algal covers. Theodoxus needs rough surfaces in order to be able to digest its food, so a stony substrate is necessary. Green algae are not consumed; Theodoxus has no cellulases. These snails lay egg capsules containing 30–70 eggs each, usually on the shells of other Theodoxus animals; only one juvenile grows, the other eggs serve as food.

== Species ==
There were no systematic review of the genus Theodoxus as of 2007. Bunje (2004) noted at least 34 extant taxa at species level in the genus Theodoxus. IUCN Red List (2015) provided conservation status for 23 species of Theodoxus.

Species within the genus Theodoxus include:

Subgenus Brusinaella Andrusov, 1912

- † Theodoxus petasatus (Seninski, 1905)

Subgenus Calvertia Bourguignat, 1880

- † Theodoxus acuticarinatus (Fuchs, 1870)
- † Theodoxus amblygonioides Wenz, 1930
- † Theodoxus amethystinus (Brusina, 1874)
- † Theodoxus anconae (Capellini, 1880)
- † Theodoxus angularis Gozhik, 2002
- † Theodoxus anonymus Anistratenko & Gozhik, 1995
- † Theodoxus atticus Kühn, 1963
- † Theodoxus barakovici (Brusina, 1902)
- † Theodoxus bessarabicus (Sinzov, 1896)
- † Theodoxus brusinai (Pavlović, 1931)
- † Theodoxus capellinii (Pantanelli, 1876)
- † Theodoxus capillaceus (Brusina, 1874)
- † Theodoxus crescens (Fuchs, 1870)
- † Theodoxus doderleini (d'Ancona, 1869)
- † Theodoxus dumortieri (Fontannes, 1878)
- † Theodoxus fasciatus Gozhik in Gozhik & Datsenko, 2007
- † Theodoxus gnezdai (Brusina, 1884)
- † Theodoxus grateloupianus (Férussac, 1823)
- † Theodoxus hoernesanus (Semper, 1867)
- † Theodoxus ingulenzis Gozhik in Gozhik & Datsenko, 2007
- † Theodoxus kalodictya (Andrusov, 1909)
- † Theodoxus koslinskyi (Porumbaru, 1881)
- † Theodoxus lamellatus (Brusina, 1892)
- † Theodoxus lineatus (Sinzov, 1896)
- † Theodoxus lorkovici (Brusina, 1878)
- † Theodoxus macedonicus Wenz, 1943
- † Theodoxus maculosus Gozhik in Gozhik & Datsenko, 2007
- † Theodoxus mayeri (Semper, 1867)
- † Theodoxus militaris (Neumayr, 1869)
- † Theodoxus miljkovici (Brusina, 1902)
- † Theodoxus millepunctatus (Brusina, 1902)
- † Theodoxus moeschi Locard, 1893
- † Theodoxus morulus Kühn, 1963
- † Theodoxus mutinensis (d'Ancona, 1869)
- † Theodoxus neumayri (Burgerstein, 1877)
- † Theodoxus nitens Gozhik, 2002
- † Theodoxus nivosus (Brusina, 1874)
- † Theodoxus novorossicus (Sinzov, 1896)
- † Theodoxus obtusangulaeformis Gozhik, 2002
- † Theodoxus oxytropida (Andrusov, 1909)
- † Theodoxus pavlovici Milošević, 1983
- † Theodoxus philippianus Locard, 1883
- † Theodoxus pilari (Brusina, 1884)
- † Theodoxus platystoma (Brusina, 1874)
- † Theodoxus pseudodanubialis (Sinzov, 1896)
- † Theodoxus pseudofluviatilis Locard, 1893
- † Theodoxus pseudograteloupanus (Sinzov, 1884)
- † Theodoxus radmanesti (Fuchs, 1870)
- † Theodoxus radovanovici (Brusina, 1893)
- † Theodoxus reiseri (Brusina, 1902)
- † Theodoxus rugosus (Pavlović, 1931)
- † Theodoxus sagittiferus (Brusina, 1874)
- † Theodoxus schachmaticus (Andrusov, 1909)
- † Theodoxus scoliogramma (Brusina, 1884)
- † Theodoxus semidentatus (Sandberger, 1875)
- † Theodoxus serrulatus (Brusina, 1892)
- † Theodoxus slavonicus (Brusina, 1878)
- † Theodoxus sophievkaensis Gozhik in Gozhik & Datsenko, 2007
- † Theodoxus stanae (Brusina, 1893)
- † Theodoxus stefanescui (Fontannes, 1887)
- † Theodoxus stefanescuiformis Gozhik in Gozhik & Datsenko, 2007
- † Theodoxus subquadrofasciatus Gozhik, 2002
- † Theodoxus subslavonicus Gozhik, 2002
- † Theodoxus sundicus (Andrusov, 1909)
- † Theodoxus suskalovici (Pavlović, 1903)
- † Theodoxus sycophantus (Brusina, 1878)
- † Theodoxus tropidophorus (Brusina, 1884)
- † Theodoxus turbinatus (Fuchs, 1870)
- † Theodoxus veljetinensis (Pavlović, 1903)
- † Theodoxus venustus (Brusina, 1897)
- † Theodoxus xanthozona (Brusina, 1884)
- † Theodoxus zagradovkaensis Gozhik, 2002
- † Theodoxus zivkovici (Pavlović, 1903)

Subgenus Neritonyx Andrusov, 1912

- † Theodoxus unguiculatus (Seninski, 1905)

Subgenus Ninniopsis Tomlin, 1930

- † Theodoxus colchicus (Andrusov, 1912)

Subgenus Neritaea Roth, 1855

- Theodoxus anatolicus (Récluz, 1841)
- † Theodoxus groyanus (Férussac, 1823)
- Theodoxus jordani (G. B. Sowerby I, 1836)
- † Theodoxus micans (Gaudry & Fischer in Gaudry, 1867)
- Theodoxus niloticus (Reeve, 1856) - synonym: Theodoxus africanus (Reeve, 1856)
- † Theodoxus subdoricus Schütt, 1976
- Theodoxus subterrelictus Schütt, 1963
- Theodoxus peloponensis (Récluz, 1841)
- Theodoxus varius (Menke, 1828)

Subgenus Theodoxus Montfort, 1810

- Theodoxus altenai Schütt, 1965
- Theodoxus baeticus (Lamarck, 1822)
- † Theodoxus becenensis (Cobălcescu, 1883)
- † Theodoxus brenneri (Handmann, 1882)
- † Theodoxus carasiensis Jekelius, 1944
- † Theodoxus constantiae Stefanescu, 1896
- † Theodoxus culceri (Porumbaru, 1881)
- † Theodoxus cyrtocelis (Krauss, 1852)
- Theodoxus danubialis (Pfeiffer, 1828)
- † Theodoxus denisluensis (Oppenheim, 1919)
- † Theodoxus deperditus (Almera, 1894)
- † Theodoxus elongatulus (Philippi, 1844)
- † Theodoxus eugenii Jekelius, 1944
- Theodoxus euxinus (Clessin, 1886)
- Theodoxus fluviatilis (Linnaeus, 1758) - type species. synonyms: Theodoxus brauneri (Lindholm, 1908) (but as separate species per); Theodoxus brauneri f. lacrymans Lindholm, 1908; Theodoxus brauneri f. alboguttata Lindholm, 1908; Theodoxus brauneri f. pulherrima Lindholm, 1908; Theodoxus lutetianus Montfort, 1810. Bunje (2005) does not consider Theodoxus velox Anistratenko, 1999 to be a distinct species from Theodoxus fluviatilis.
- † Theodoxus gregarius (Thomä, 1845)
- Theodoxus heldreichi (Martens, 1879)
- † Theodoxus hisingeri (Bellardi & Michelotti, 1841)
- Theodoxus hispalensis (Martens, 1879)
- † Theodoxus jekeliusi Jurišić-Polšak, 1979
- † Theodoxus leobersdorfensis (Handmann, 1887)
- Theodoxus meridionalis (Philippi, 1836)
- † Theodoxus milessii Papp, 1979
- † Theodoxus moosbrunnensis Papp, 1953
- † Theodoxus morellii (Bellardi & Michelotti, 1841)
- Theodoxus pallasi Lindholm, 1924 - synonym: Theodoxus lituratus (Eichwald, 1838)
- † Theodoxus pilidei (Tournouër, 1879)
- Theodoxus prevostianus (Pfeiffer, 1828)
- † Theodoxus punctatolineatus (Sinzov, 1896)
- Theodoxus saulcyi (Bourguignat, 1852)
- † Theodoxus scamandrius (Calvert & Neumayr, 1880)
- † Theodoxus semiplicatus (Neumayr in Herbich & Neumayr, 1875)
- † Theodoxus simplex (Fuchs, 1877)
- † Theodoxus subglobosus (Eichwald, 1853)
- Theodoxus subthermalis (Bourguignat in Issel, 1865) or Theodoxus fluviatilis subthermalis Issel, 1865
- Theodoxus transversalis (Pfeiffer, 1828)
- † Theodoxus trifasciatus (Grateloup, 1839)
- † Theodoxus turislavicus Jekelius, 1944
- Theodoxus valentinus (Graells, 1846)
- † Theodoxus zografi (Brusina, 1902)

Subgenus ?

- † Theodoxus abnormis (Jenkins, 1864)
- † Theodoxus almelae (Revilla, 1958)
- Theodoxus astrachanicus Starobogatov, 1994
- † Theodoxus banaticus Jekelius, 1944
- † Theodoxus bohotinensis (Simionescu & Barbu, 1940)
- † Theodoxus bolivari (Royo Gómez, 1922)
- † Theodoxus bukowskii (Oppenheim, 1919)
- Theodoxus cariosus (Wood, 1828)
- Theodoxus coronatus (Leach, 1815)
- † Theodoxus crenulatus (Klein, 1853)
- † Theodoxus cunici (Brusina, 1892)
- Theodoxus danasteri (Lindholm, 1908)
- † Theodoxus doricus (Neumayr, 1880)
- Theodoxus euxinus (Clessin, 1886)
- Theodoxus gloeri Odabaşi & Arslan, 2015
- Theodoxus gurur Sands & Glöer, 2020
- † Theodoxus hellenicus (Bukowski, 1896)
- † Theodoxus imbricatus (Brusina, 1878)
- † Theodoxus intracarpaticus Jekelius, 1944
- † Theodoxus licherdopoli (Stefanescu, 1896)
- Theodoxus luteofasciatus (Miller, 1879)
- Theodoxus macri (Sowerby, 1849)
- Theodoxus maresi (Bourguignat, 1864)
- Theodoxus marteli (Pallary, 1920)
- Theodoxus milachevitchi Golikov & Starobogatov, 1966
- † Theodoxus mutinensis (d'Ancona, 1869)
- Theodoxus numidicus (Récluz, 1841)
- Theodoxus pallasi Lindholm, 1924
- Theodoxus pallidus Dunker, 1861
- † Theodoxus pappi Sauerzopf, 1952
- † Theodoxus paradisii (Magrograssi, 1928)
- † Theodoxus patrae Esu & Girotti, 2015
- † Theodoxus percarinatus (Oppenheim, 1919)
- Theodoxus pilidei (Tournouêr, 1879)
- † Theodoxus politioanei Jekelius, 1944
- † Theodoxus politus Jekelius, 1944
- Theodoxus poppei Ahuir, 2020
- † Theodoxus postcrenulatus Papp, 1953
- † Theodoxus prozlatarici Jekelius, 1944
- † Theodoxus pseudodacicus Neubauer, Harzhauser, Georgopoulou, Mandic & Kroh, 2014
- † Theodoxus quadrifasciatus (Bielz, 1864)
- † Theodoxus reticulatus Pană, 1990
- † Theodoxus rhodiensis (Tournouër in Fischer, 1877)
- Theodoxus sarmaticus (Lindholm, 1901)
- Theodoxus schultzii (Grimm, 1877)
- † Theodoxus scriptus (Stefanescu, 1896)
- † Theodoxus serratiliniformis Geyer, 1914
- † Theodoxus sinjanus (Brusina, 1876)
- † Theodoxus soceni Jekelius, 1944
- † Theodoxus sphaeroidalis (Revilla, 1958)
- † Theodoxus spratti (Jenkins, 1864)
- † Theodoxus stoicai Neubauer, Harzhauser, Georgopoulou, Mandic & Kroh, 2014
- Theodoxus subthermalis Bourguignat in Issel, 1865
- † Theodoxus susuzianus Harzhauser, Neubauer & Hoşgör, 2018
- † Theodoxus timisensis Jekelius, 1944
- † Theodoxus trilophosensis Rust, 1997
- Theodoxus velascoi (Graëlls, 1846)
- Theodoxus velox V. Anistratenko in O. Anistratenko, Starobogatov & V. Anistratenko, 1999
- Theodoxus vespertinus (Sowerby II, 1849)
- Theodoxus wesselinghi Sands & Glöer, 2020
- Theodoxus wilkei Sands & Glöer, 2020
- † Theodoxus zlatarici (Brusina, 1902)

Synonyms

- † Theodoxus burdigalensis (d'Orbigny, 1852): synonym of † Theodoxus (Theodoxus) trifasciatus (Grateloup, 1839)
- Theodoxus cariosus (Wood, 1828) and Theodoxus cariosa are synonyms of Neritina cariosa (Wood, 1828)
- † Theodoxus dacicus Jekelius, 1944: synonym of † Theodoxus (Theodoxus) leobersdorfensis dacicus Jekelius, 1944
- Theodoxus doriae Issel, 1865: synonym of Theodoxus fluviatilis (Linnaeus, 1758): synonym of Theodoxus (Theodoxus) fluviatilis (Linnaeus, 1758)
- Theodoxus euphraticus (Mousson, 1874): synonym of Neritina euphratica Mousson, 1874
- † Theodoxus intracarpatica Jekelius, 1944: synonym of † Theodoxus intracarpaticus Jekelius, 1944
- Theodoxus lutetianus Montfort, 1810: synonym of Theodoxus fluviatilis (Linnaeus, 1758): synonym of Theodoxus (Theodoxus) fluviatilis (Linnaeus, 1758)
- † Theodoxus mariae (Handmann, 1887): synonym of † Neritina mariae Handmann, 1887
- † Theodoxus martensi (Brusina, 1884): synonym of † Ninnia martensi (Brusina, 1884)
- Theodoxus neglectus (Pease, 1861): synonym of Neritina neglecta (Pease, 1861)
- † Theodoxus oslavanensis Rzehak, 1893: synonym of † Theodoxus (Theodoxus) cyrtocelis austriacus (Rzehak, 1893)
- Theodoxus oualaniense (Lesson, 1831): synonym of Clithon oualaniense (Lesson, 1831)
- † Theodoxus perlongus Jekelius, 1944: synonym of † Theodoxus (Theodoxus) zografi perlongus Jekelius, 1944
- † Theodoxus petralbensis Jekelius, 1944: synonym of † Theodoxus (Theodoxus) zografi petralbensis Jekelius, 1944
- † Theodoxus pictus (Férussac, 1823): synonym of † Agapilia picta (Férussac, 1823)
- Theodoxus reclivatus Say, 1822: synonym of Neritina usnea (Röding, 1798)
- † Theodoxus rumanus (Stefanescu, 1896): synonym of † Theodoxus (Calvertia) stefanescui (Fontannes, 1887)
- † Theodoxus scamandri (Calvert & Neumayr, 1880): synonym of † Theodoxus (Theodoxus) scamandrius (Calvert & Neumayr, 1880)
- Theodoxus vespertinus (G. B. Sowerby II, 1849): synonym of Neritina vespertinus (G. B. Sowerby II, 1849)
- † Theodoxus vetranici (Brusina, 1902): synonym of † Neritina vetranici (Brusina, 1902)
- Theodoxus virginea (Linnaeus, 1758): synonym of Neritina virginea (Linnaeus, 1758)
- † Theodoxus (Vittoclithon) pictus bizonalis (Grateloup, 1839): synonym of † Agapilia picta bizonalis (Grateloup, 1839)
