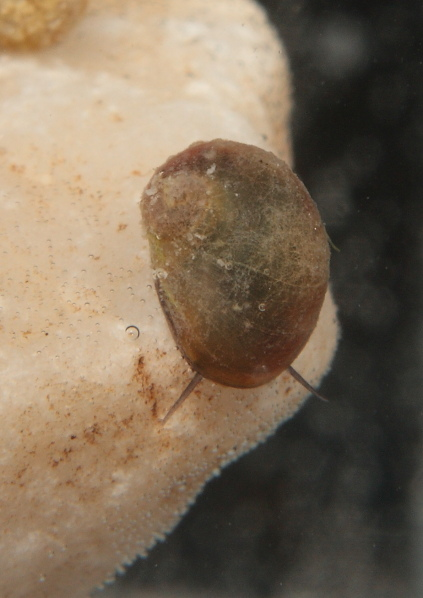
- A live Theodoxus saulcyi, Bad Vöslau, Austria

Conservation status
- Data Deficient (IUCN 3.1)

Scientific classification
- Kingdom: Animalia
- Phylum: Mollusca
- Class: Gastropoda
- Order: Cycloneritida
- Family: Neritidae
- Genus: Theodoxus
- Species: T. saulcyi

Binomial name
- Theodoxus saulcyi (Bourguignat, 1852)

Synonyms
- Neritina Saulcyi Bourguignat, 1852

= Theodoxus saulcyi =

Species of gastropod

Theodoxus saulcyi is a species of small freshwater snail with an operculum, an aquatic gastropod mollusc in the family Neritidae, the nerites.

== Distribution ==
This species occurs in:

- Greece

== Description ==
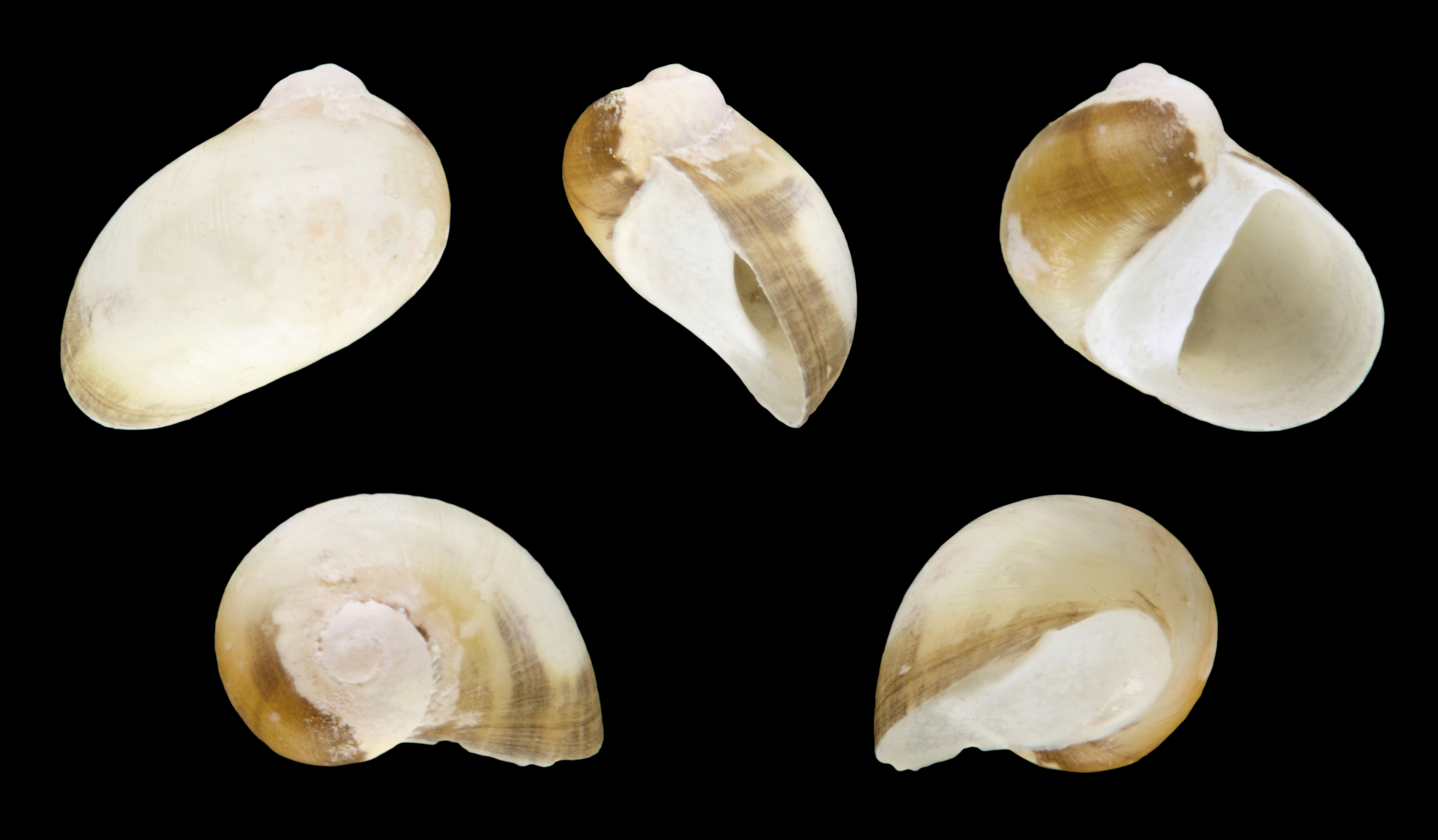
Theodoxus saulcyi shell
