= Theodoxus maresi =

Conservation status
- Data Deficient (IUCN 3.1)

Scientific classification
- Kingdom: Animalia
- Phylum: Mollusca
- Class: Gastropoda
- Order: Cycloneritida
- Family: Neritidae
- Genus: Theodoxus
- Species: T. maresi

Binomial name
- Theodoxus maresi (Bourguignat, 1864)

Synonyms
- Neritina maresi Bourguignat, 1864; Neritina marteli pars Pallary, 1920; Theodoxus vondeli pars Pallary, 1936

Species of gastropod

Theodoxus maresi is a species of small freshwater snail with an operculum, an aquatic gastropod mollusk in the family Neritidae the nerites.

== Distribution ==
This species is found in Algeria and Morocco. The type locality is Aïn Khadra, near Zerguin, in north-eastern Algeria.

== Description ==
The length of the shell is 8 mm.
