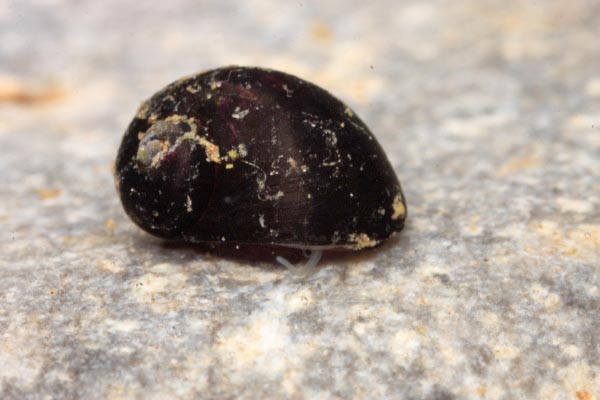
- Theodoxus prevostianus, Bad Vöslau, Austria

Conservation status
- Endangered (IUCN 3.1)

Scientific classification
- Kingdom: Animalia
- Phylum: Mollusca
- Class: Gastropoda
- Order: Cycloneritida
- Family: Neritidae
- Genus: Theodoxus
- Species: T. prevostianus

Binomial name
- Theodoxus prevostianus (C. Pfeiffer, 1828)

Synonyms
- Nerita prevostiana C. Pfeiffer, 1828

= Theodoxus prevostianus =

Species of gastropod

Theodoxus prevostianus is a species of small freshwater snail with an operculum, an aquatic gastropod mollusk in the family Neritidae, the nerites.

== Distribution ==
This species occurs in:

- Austria
- Hungary
- Slovenia
- Croatia - regionally extinct
- Romania - regionally extinct

== Description ==
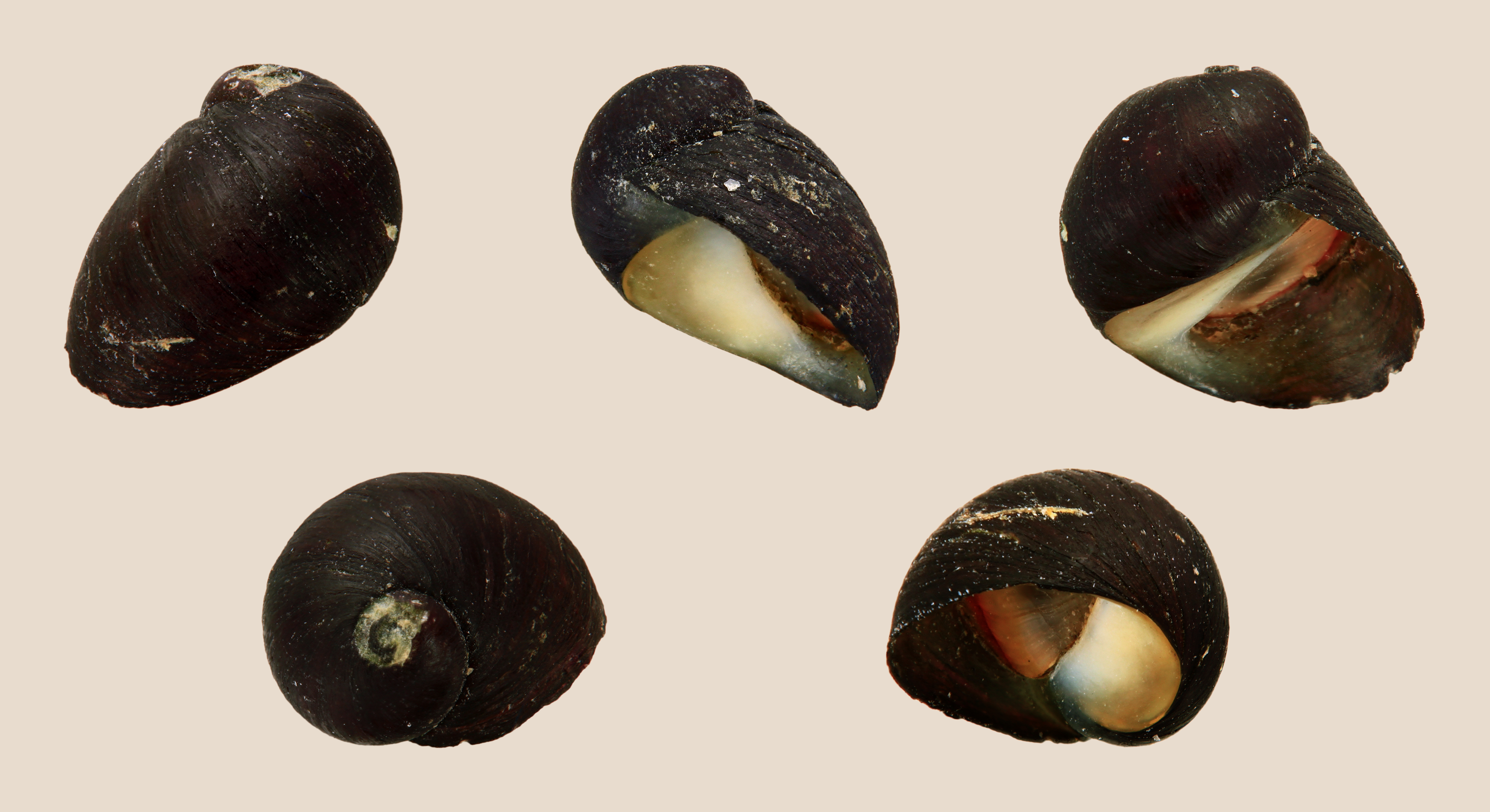
Theodoxus prevostianus shell
