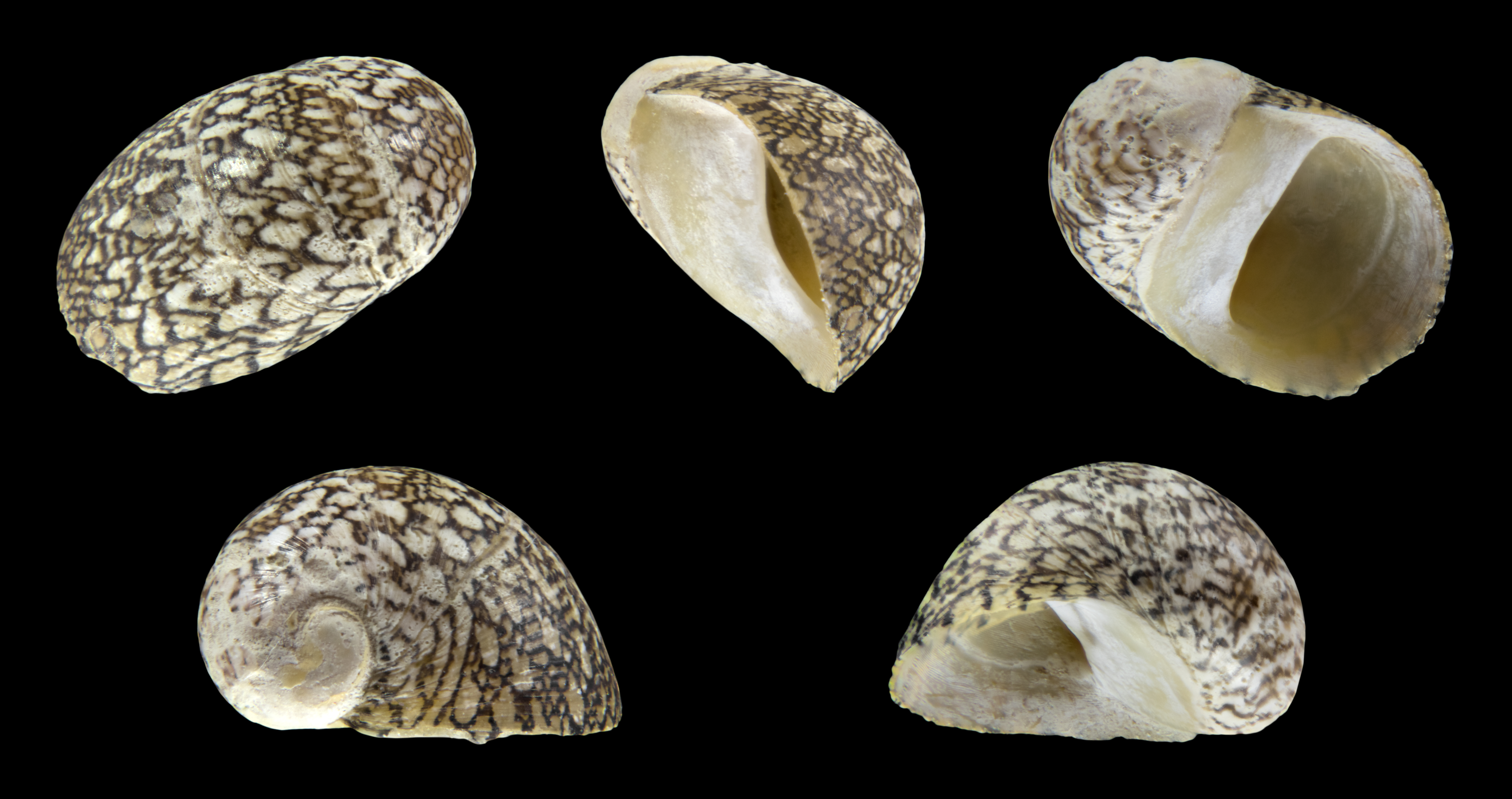
- A shell of Theodoxus euxinus

Scientific classification
- Kingdom: Animalia
- Phylum: Mollusca
- Class: Gastropoda
- Order: Cycloneritida
- Family: Neritidae
- Genus: Theodoxus
- Species: T. euxinus

Binomial name
- Theodoxus euxinus (Clessin, 1886)

Synonyms
- Neritina euxina Clessin, 1886; Theodoxus fluviatilis euxinus (Clessin, 1886); Theodoxus euxina

= Theodoxus euxinus =

Species of gastropod

Theodoxus euxinus is a species of small freshwater snail with a gill and an operculum, an aquatic gastropod mollusk in the family Neritidae, the nerites.

== Distribution ==
The distribution of this species includes:

- Ukraine
- Romania
- Greece

The type locality is Dobrogea, Romania.

== Description ==
The shell is shiny, smooth, with a coarse white ziczac pattern. The width of the shell is 6–8 mm.

== Ecology ==
This species occurs in woodlands of the Danube Delta region, on rocks, and on sandy or muddy substrates.
