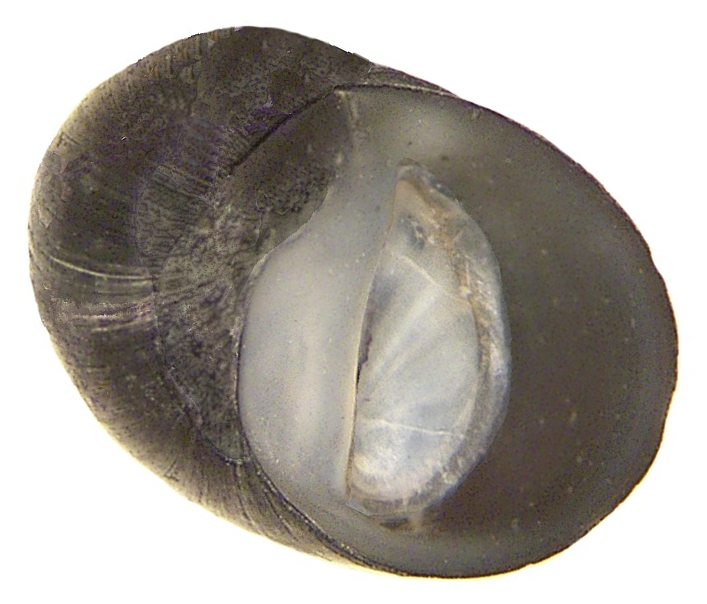

Conservation status
- Near Threatened (IUCN 3.1)

Scientific classification
- Kingdom: Animalia
- Phylum: Mollusca
- Class: Gastropoda
- Order: Cycloneritida
- Family: Neritidae
- Genus: Theodoxus
- Species: T. anatolicus

Binomial name
- Theodoxus anatolicus (Récluz, 1841)

Synonyms
- Nerita anatolica Récluz, 1841; Neritina anatolica (Récluz, 1841) (superseded combination); † Neritina belladonna Mousson, 1874 (junior subjective synonym); Theodoxus (Neritaea) anatolicus (Récluz, 1841)· accepted, alternate representation

= Theodoxus anatolicus =

Species of gastropod

Theodoxus anatolicus is a species of a freshwater snail with an operculum, an aquatic gastropod mollusk in the family Neritidae, the nerites.

== Distribution ==
This species occurs in:

- Turkey
- Cyprus
