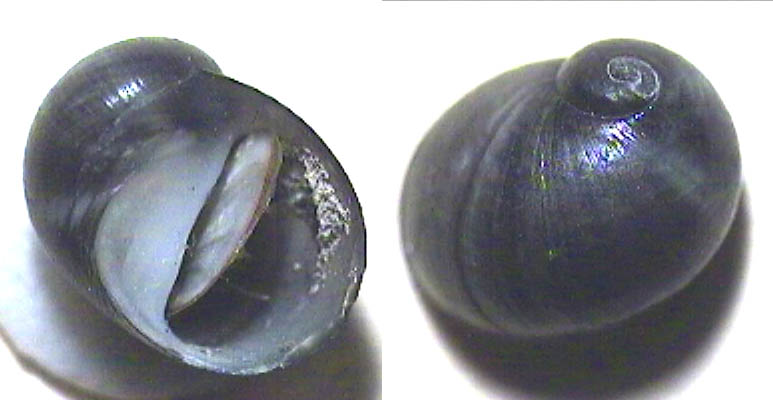
- Two views of a shell of Theodoxus meridionalis; the left view has the operculum in place in a partially open position

Conservation status
- Least Concern (IUCN 3.1)

Scientific classification
- Kingdom: Animalia
- Phylum: Mollusca
- Class: Gastropoda
- Order: Cycloneritida
- Family: Neritidae
- Genus: Theodoxus
- Species: T. meridionalis

Binomial name
- Theodoxus meridionalis (Philippi, 1836)

Synonyms
- Nerita meridionalis Philippi, 1836

= Theodoxus meridionalis =

Species of gastropod

Theodoxus meridionalis is a species of freshwater snail with a gill and an operculum. It is an aquatic gastropod mollusk in the family Neritidae, the nerites.

== Distribution ==
The distribution of this species includes Sicily (which is part of Italy), and north-western Tunisia.

The type locality is Syracuse, Sicily.

== Description ==
The shell is cone-shaped to half-egg-shaped, almost smooth and weakly shiny. The color is pale yellowish with dark red to blackish zigzag streaks.

Dimensions of the shell are 4–5 × 7–8 mm.

== Ecology ==
This small snail lives in cold running waters.
