= Theodoxus numidicus =

Conservation status
- Vulnerable (IUCN 3.1)

Scientific classification
- Kingdom: Animalia
- Phylum: Mollusca
- Class: Gastropoda
- Order: Cycloneritida
- Family: Neritidae
- Genus: Theodoxus
- Species: T. numidicus

Binomial name
- Theodoxus numidicus (Récluz, 1841)

Synonyms
- Neritina numidica Recluz, 1841 (original combination)

Species of gastropod

Theodoxus numidicus is a species of small freshwater snail with an operculum, an aquatic gastropod mollusk in the family Neritidae, the nerites.

== Distribution ==
This species is found in Algeria and Morocco. The type locality is Oran, north-western Algeria.

== Description ==
The length of the shell is 7 mm.
