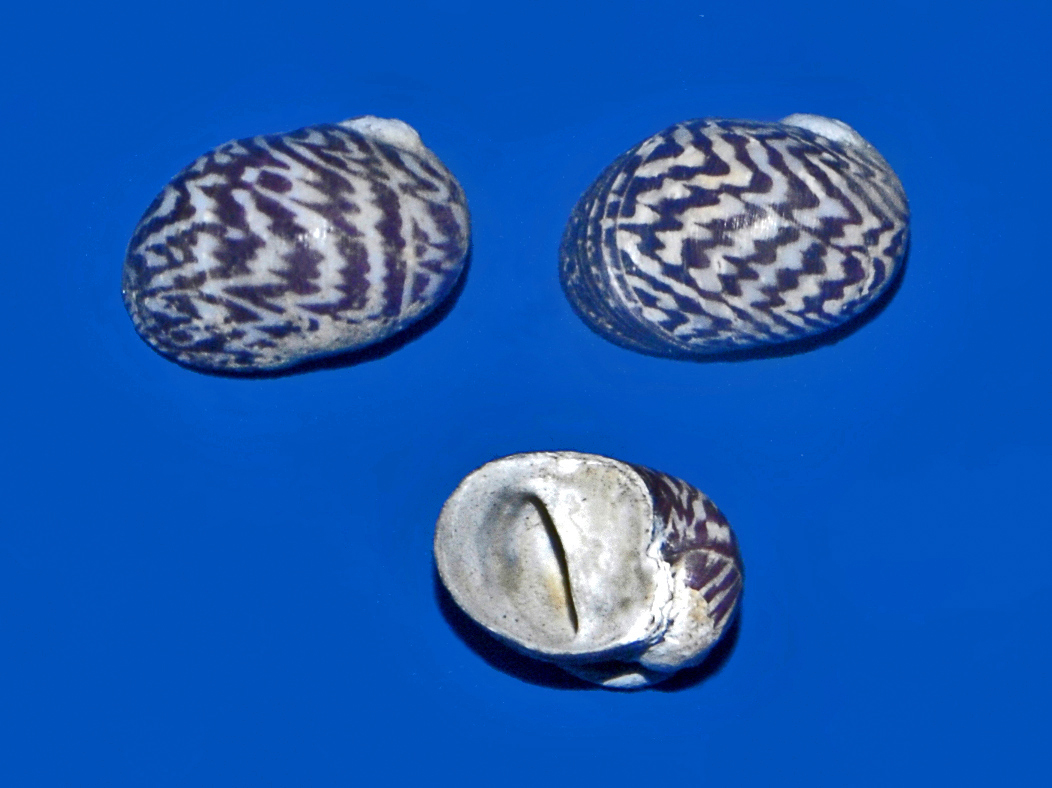
- Shells of Theodoxus danubialis from Lombardy, on display at the Museo Civico di Storia Naturale di Milano

Scientific classification
- Kingdom: Animalia
- Phylum: Mollusca
- Class: Gastropoda
- Order: Cycloneritida
- Family: Neritidae
- Genus: Theodoxus
- Species: T. danubialis

Binomial name
- Theodoxus danubialis (C. Pfeiffer, 1828)

= Theodoxus danubialis =

Species of gastropod

Theodoxus danubialis is a species of small freshwater snail with an operculum, an aquatic gastropod mollusk in the family Neritidae, the nerites. The species is considered as endangered in Germany, Austria and in the Czech Republic.

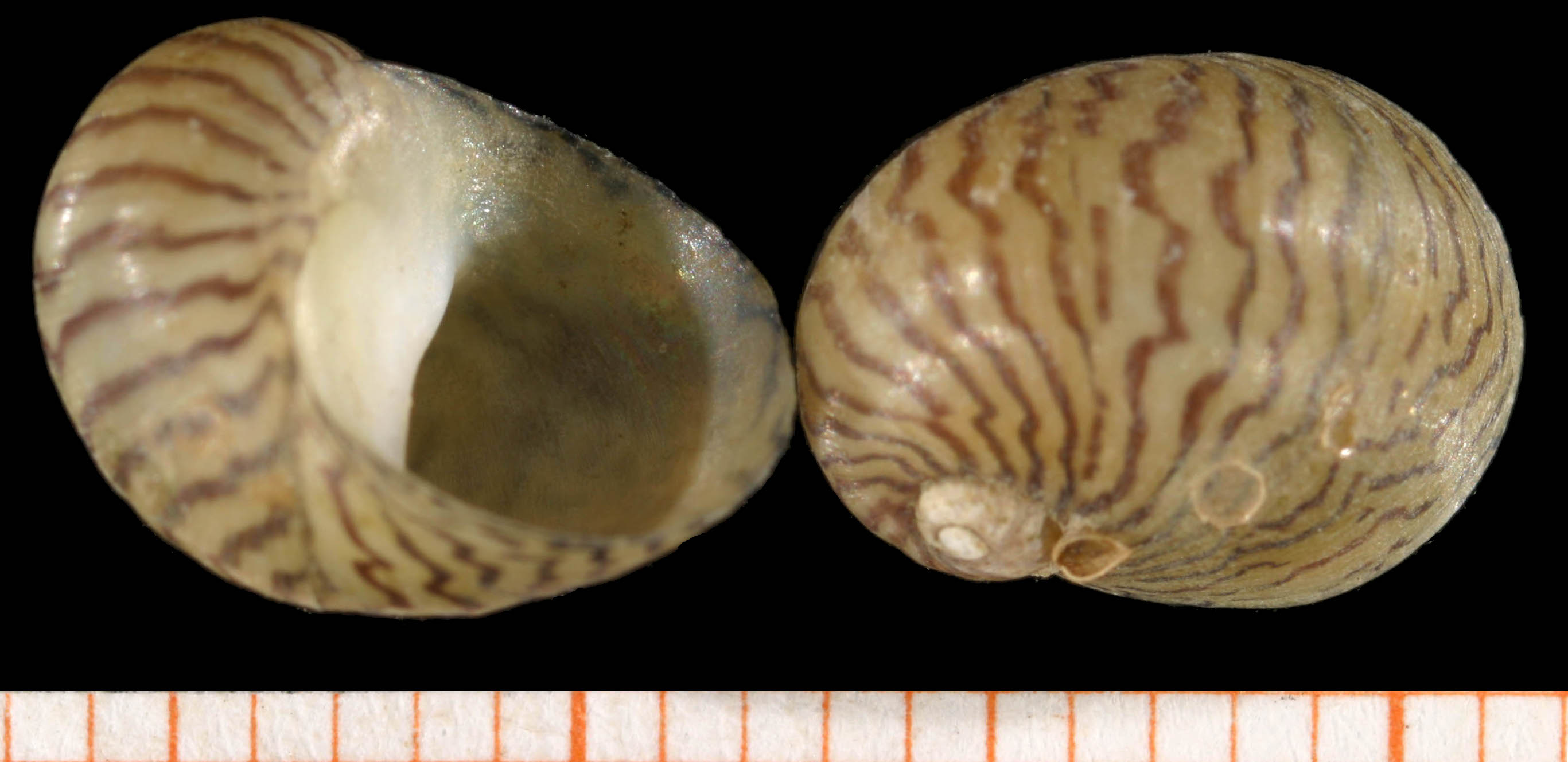
Two shells of Theodoxus danubialis from Germany

== Etymology ==
The Latin name Theodoxus danubialis means "God's gift to the Danube" or "The praise of God in the Danube".

== Subspecies ==
- Theodoxus danubialis cantianus (Kennard & Woodward, 1924) †
- Theodoxus danubialis danubialis (C. Pfeiffer, 1828)
- Theodoxus danubialis stragulatus (C. Pfeiffer, 1828)

== Description ==
Shells of Theodoxus danubialis can reach a diameter of 9–13 millimetres (0.35–0.51 in). These shells are quite flattened, with 3–3.5 whorls. The surface has a characteristic dark brown zigzag drawing on a light background. The width of the zigzag lines is variable. The mouth is round to slightly elliptical. The operculum is pale yellow. The edge is brown and slightly thickened. The body of the snail is bright with a wide base. The antennae are long and pointed.

== Distribution ==
The distribution of this species is Mediterranean and Pontic. It occurs in Austria, Bosnia and Herzegovina, Bulgaria, Croatia, Czech Republic (in Moravia it is critically endangered), Germany (in Bavaria only and it is critically endangered), Hungary, Italy, Romania, Slovakia, Slovenia, Ukraine, Serbia and Montenegro.

== Habitat ==
This species needs clean, oxygen-rich rivers. These snails live on hard benthic substrates, typically rocks or stony ground and feed mainly on diatoms.

== Bibliography ==
- Peter Glöer: Die Tierwelt Deutschlands. Mollusca I Süßwassergastropoden Nord- und Mitteleuropas Bestimmungsschlüssel, Lebensweise, Verbreitung. 2. neubearb. Aufl., 327 S., ConchBooks, Hackenheim 2002 ISBN 3-925919-60-0
- Rosina Fechter und Gerhard Falkner: Weichtiere. 287 S., Mosaik-Verlag, München 1990 (Steinbachs Naturführer 10) ISBN 3-570-03414-3
- Jürgen H. Jungbluth und Dietrich von Knore: Trivialnamen der Land- und Süßwassermollusken Deutschlands (Gastropoda et Bivalvia). Mollusca, 26(1): 105-156, Dresden 2008 ISSN 1864-5127
