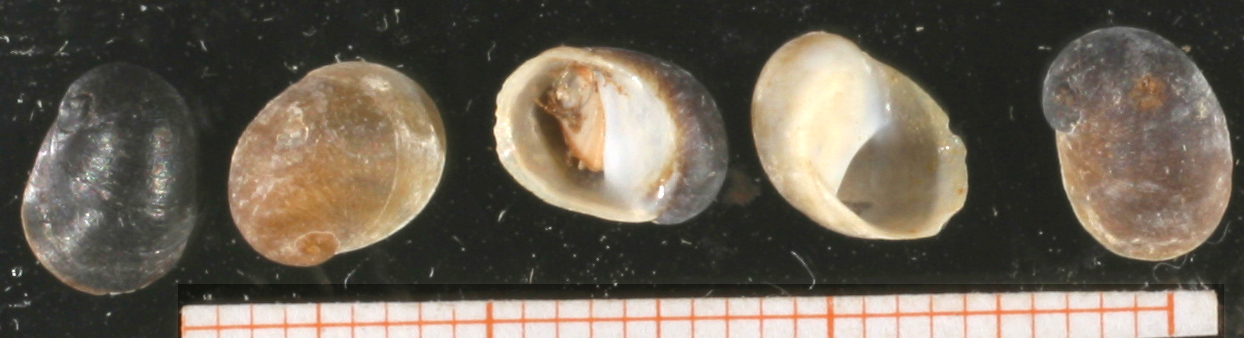
- Five shells of Theodoxus transversalis

Conservation status
- Endangered (IUCN 3.1)

Scientific classification
- Kingdom: Animalia
- Phylum: Mollusca
- Class: Gastropoda
- Order: Cycloneritida
- Family: Neritidae
- Genus: Theodoxus
- Species: T. transversalis

Binomial name
- Theodoxus transversalis (C. Pfeiffer, 1828)

= Striped nerite =

Species of gastropod

The striped nerite, scientific name Theodoxus transversalis, is a species of small freshwater snail with an operculum, an aquatic gastropod mollusk in the family Neritidae, the nerites.

== Distribution ==
The distribution of this species is Danubian.

Fehér et al. (2012) revealed in their conservation genetics study, that intraspecific variability of two researched DNA markers (cytochrome c oxidase subunit I and ATP synthase subunit α) is very low. They hypothesized that the bottlenecked population colonized the whole range of Theodoxus transversalis in the Holocene. Fehér et al. (2012) also hypothesized that such low genetic diversity caused the high sensitivity of Theodoxus transversalis to water quality. Theodoxus transversalis was widespread in Danubian drainage, but the population of this species declined because of water pollution and this species is considered as endangered. It is also listed in the Annexes II and IV of the Habitats Directive.

It occurs in:

- Austria
- Bulgaria
- Croatia
- Germany - in Bavaria only and it is critically endangered (vom Aussterben bedroht)
- Slovakia
- Hungary
- Moldova
- Romania
- Serbia
- Ukraine
