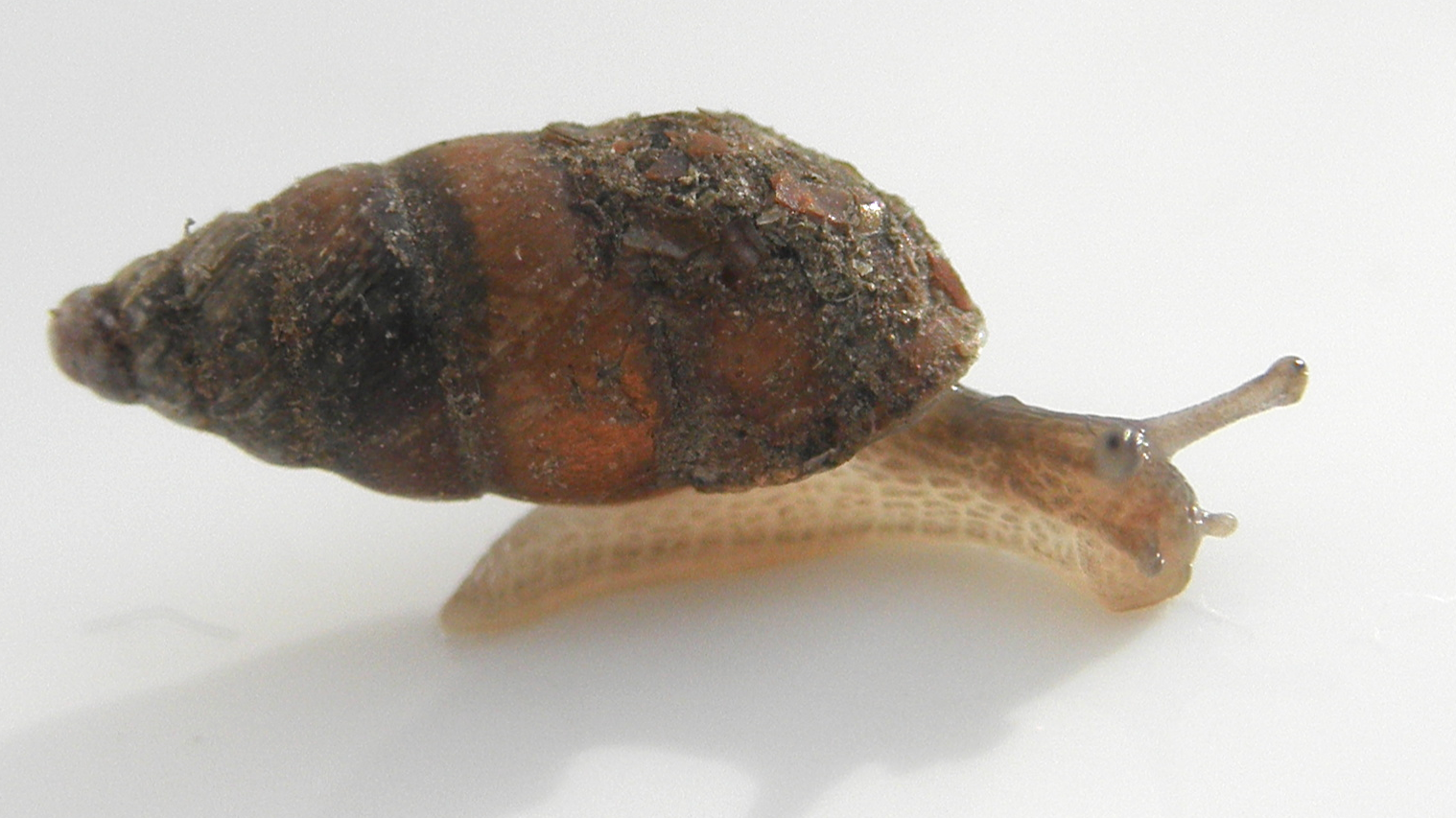

Scientific classification
- Domain: Eukaryota
- Kingdom: Animalia
- Phylum: Mollusca
- Class: Gastropoda
- Order: Stylommatophora
- Family: Enidae
- Genus: Merdigera
- Species: M. obscura

Binomial name
- Merdigera obscura (O. F. Müller, 1774)

Synonyms
- Helix obscura Müller, 1774; Bulimus excessivus Pirona, 1865; Bulimus columellaris Westerlund, 1887

= Merdigera obscura =

Species of gastropod

Merdigera obscura is a species of air-breathing land snail, a terrestrial pulmonate gastropod mollusk in the family Enidae.

== Distribution and habitat ==
This species is present in north-western Africa and in most of Europe from Portugal to Russia. These terrestrial molluscs prefers shady and rocky environments in deciduous forests, at an elevation of 2,000–2,200 metres (6,600–7,200 ft) above sea level. They can be found mainly at tree trunks, under leaf litter or stones and on walls. They prefer shady and rocky environments in deciduous forests, at an elevation of 2,000–2,200 metres (6,600–7,200 ft) above sea level. They can be found mainly at tree trunks, under leaf litter or stones and on walls.

== Description ==
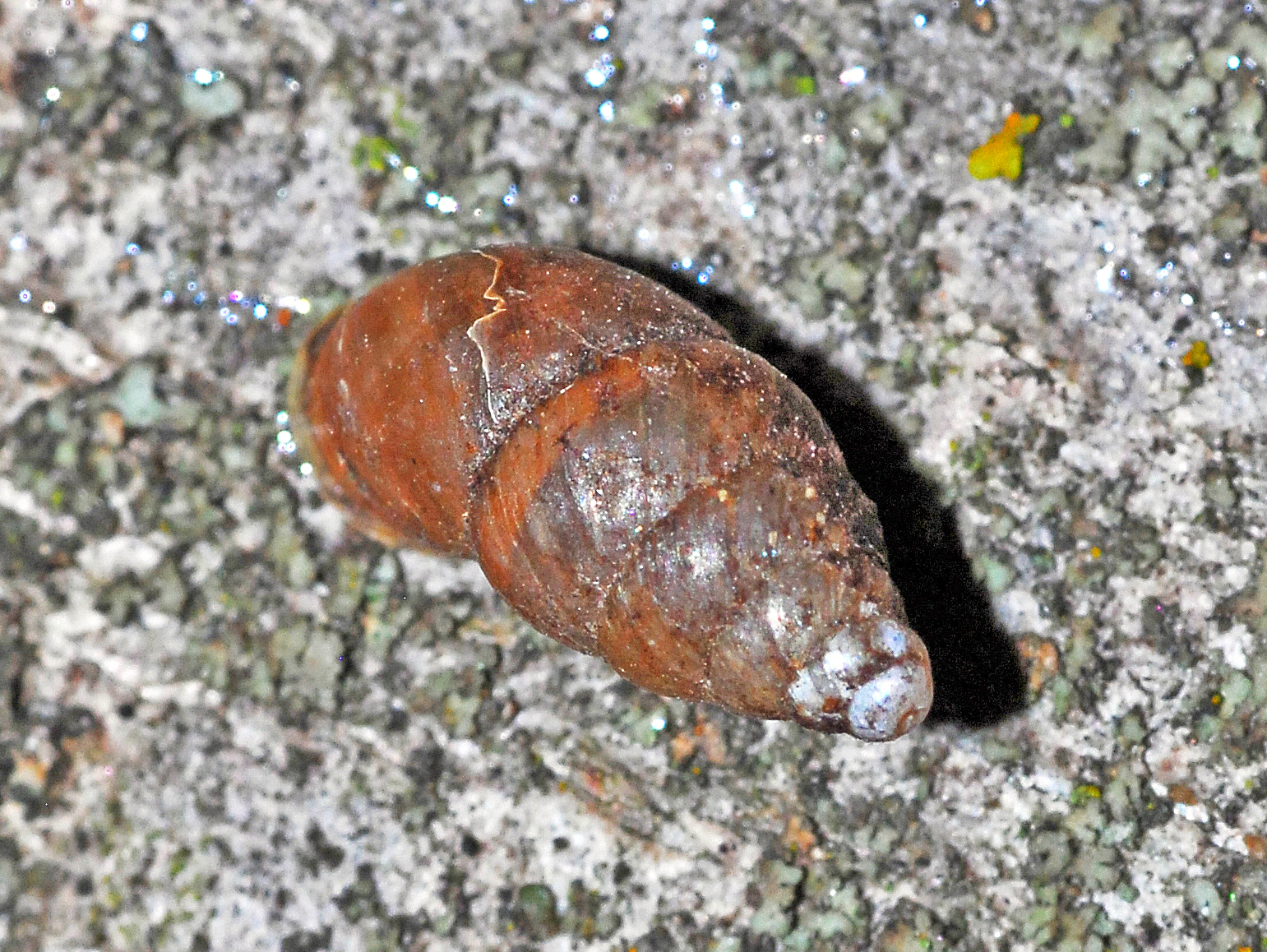
Shell of a live M. obscura on a wall

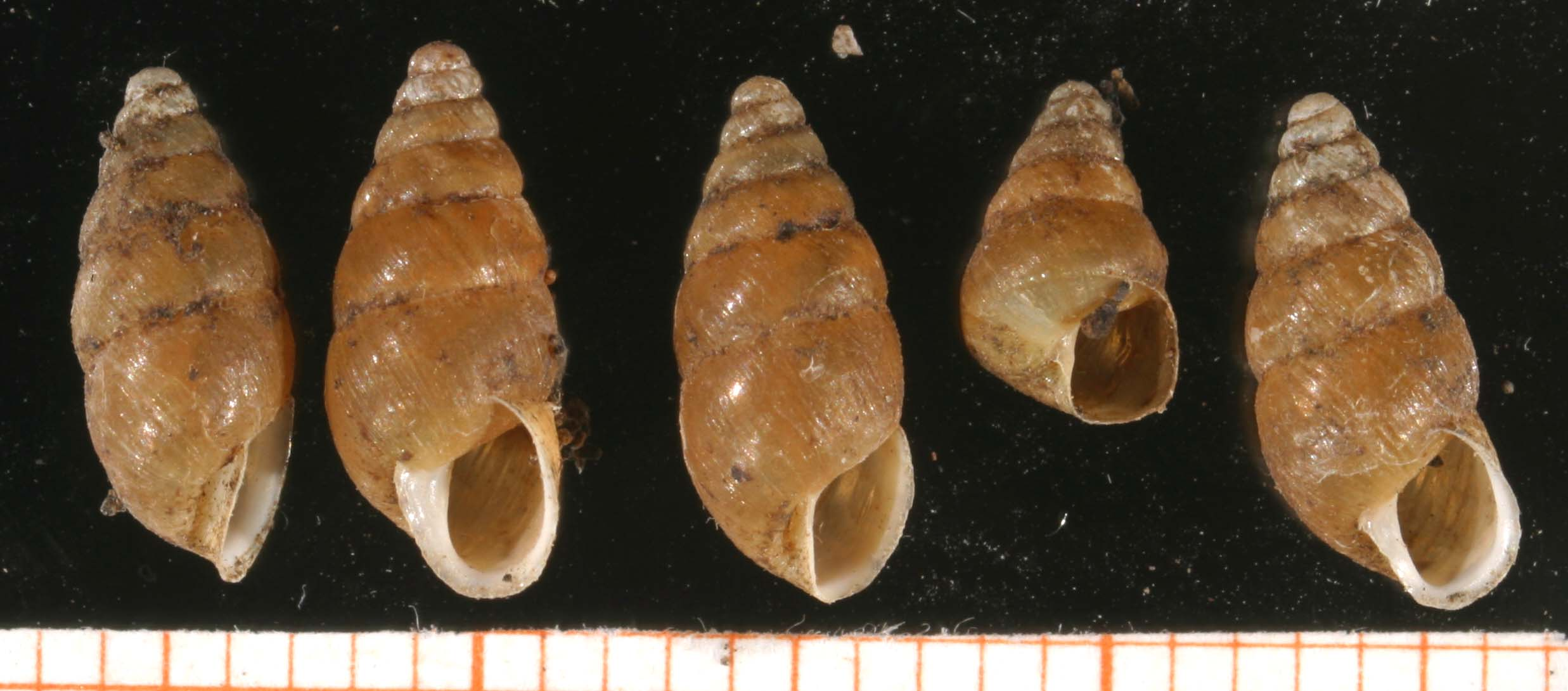
Merdigera obscura shells.

Merdigera obscura can reach a shell length of about 8.5–10.5 x 3–4 mm. These shells have 6 slightly convex whorls with deep suture. The apertural margin is reflected and white, not connected by a callus or white layer at the parietal side. The shell colour is evenly brown. The surface has dense radially striations.

The animal is dark brown, lighter laterally and on the foot. The upper tentacles are long, the lower tentacles length is 1/4 of upper tentacles. The animal crawls with the shell in a very high position and not much bent to the right side. Juveniles and adults often have camouflage. This species is rather similar to Ena montana.

== Biology ==
Females lay 12–20 oval eggs between May and October. Juveniles hatch after 2 weeks. Adults can be found in the first months of the second year.

== See also ==
- List of non-marine molluscs of the Czech Republic
- List of non-marine molluscs of Ukraine
- List of non-marine molluscs of Great Britain
- List of non-marine molluscs of Ireland

== Bibliography ==
- Anderson, R. 2005. An Annotated List of the Non-Marine Mollusca of Britain and Ireland. InvertebrateIreland Online, Ulster Museum, Belfast and National Museum of Ireland, Dublin
- Kerney, M, 1999, Atlas of the Land and Freshwater Molluscs of Britain and Ireland, Harley Books,
