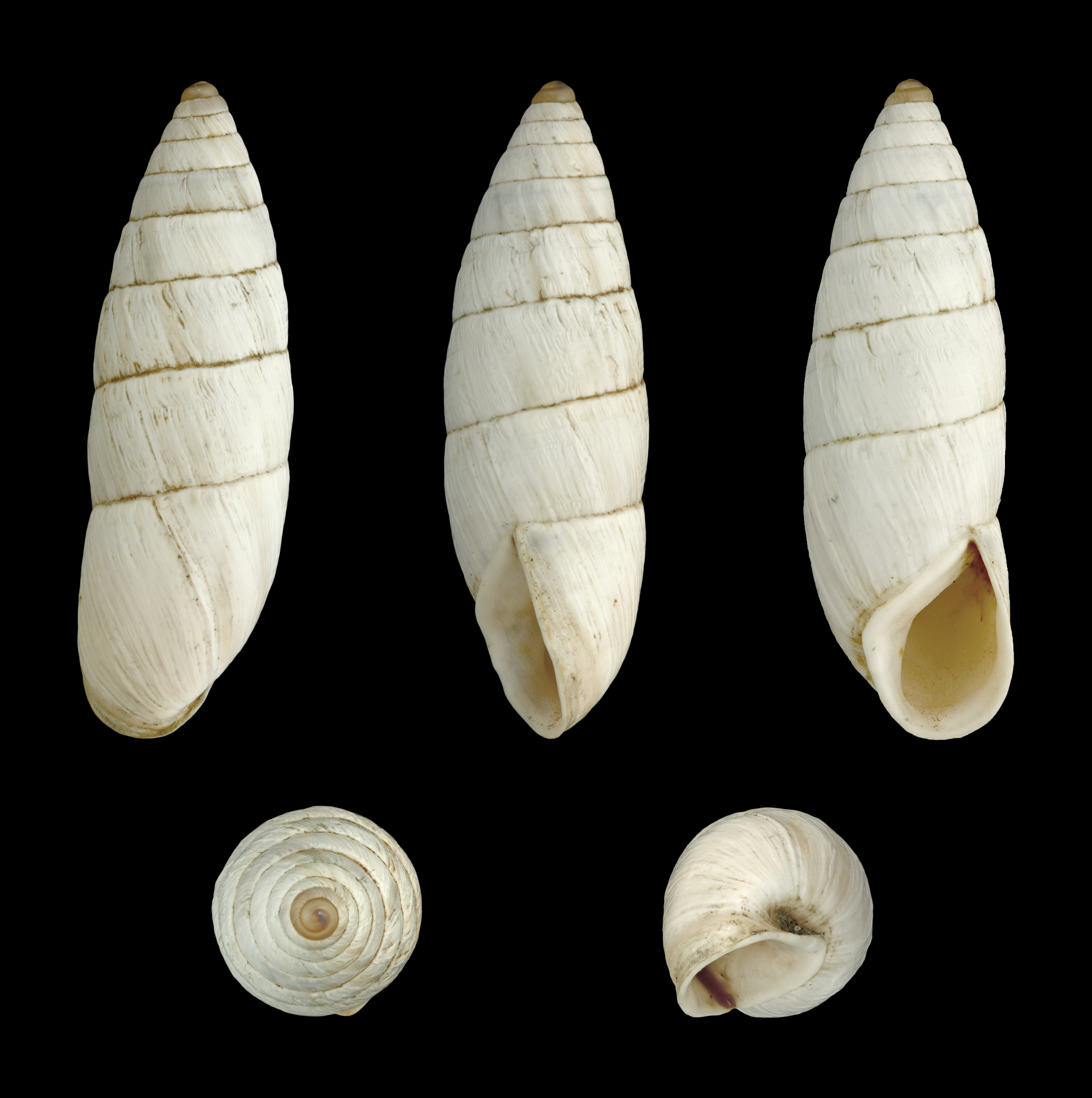
- Brephulopsis cylindrica (white form)
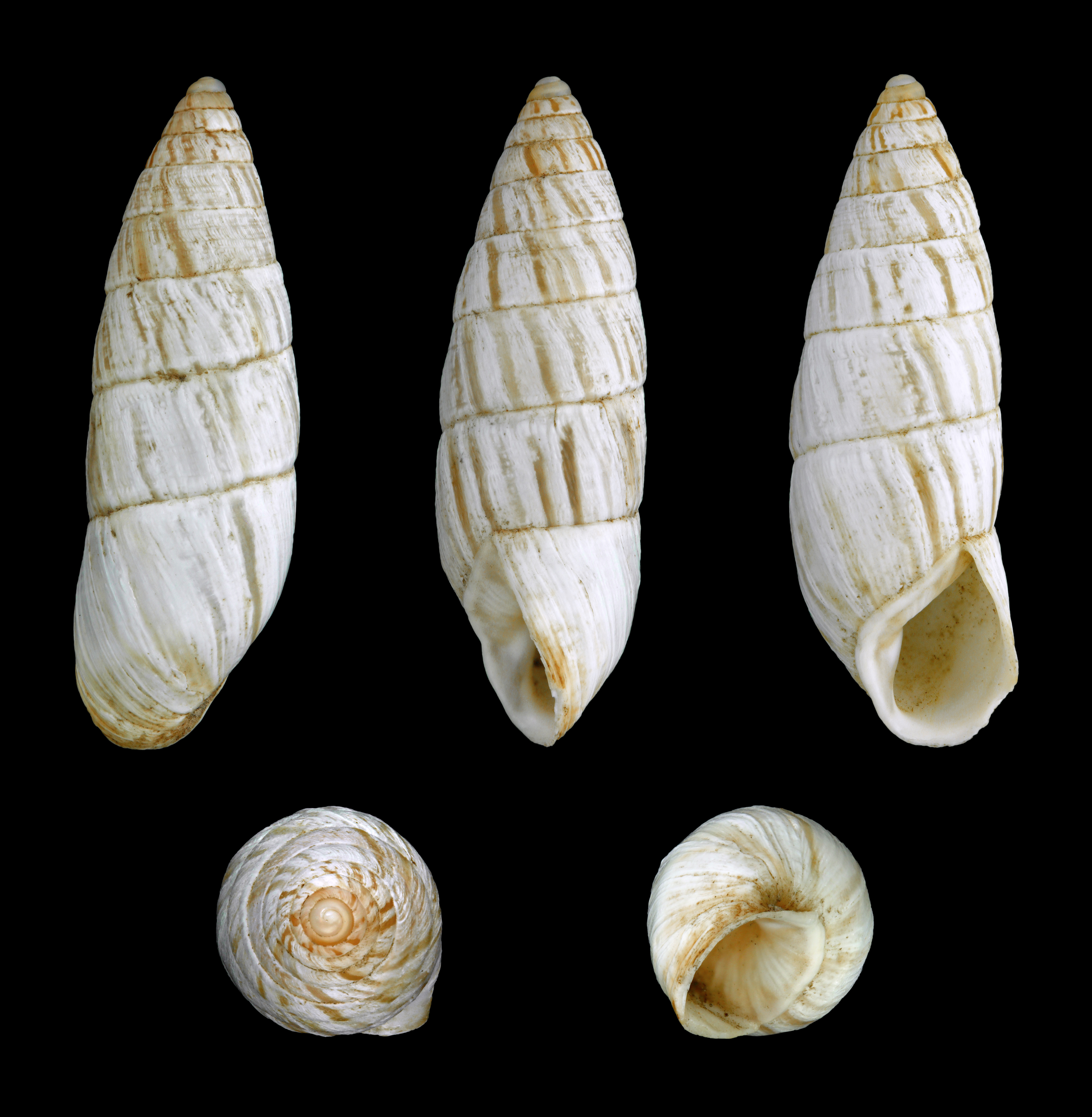
- Brephulopsis cylindrica (streaked form)

Scientific classification
- Kingdom: Animalia
- Phylum: Mollusca
- Class: Gastropoda
- Order: Stylommatophora
- Family: Enidae
- Genus: Brephulopsis
- Species: B. cylindrica

Binomial name
- Brephulopsis cylindrica (Menke, 1828)

Synonyms
- Bulimus cylindricus Menke, 1828

= Brephulopsis cylindrica =

Species of gastropod

Brephulopsis cylindrica is a species of air-breathing land snail, a terrestrial pulmonate gastropod mollusk in the family Enidae.

== Distribution ==
The distribution of this species includes:

- Ukraine - mainly in Crimea and other southern regions, but recently invaded also other parts of country
- Moldova
- Belarus - since 2010

== Description ==
The color of the shell is bluish white or white, sometimes with dark streaks and opaque. The shell has 9-12 not very convex whorls. The aperture is inside yellow-brownish in color, with a weak white lip. Columella is slightly thickened.

The width of the shell is 7.5–9 mm. The height of the shell is 22–35 mm.

== Nomenclature ==
Before 2015 the specific name cylindricus was not available for this species because Bulimus cylindricus Menke, 1828 is a junior homonym of Bulimus cylindricus Gray, 1825. The correct name would be most probably Brephulopsis fusiformis (Menke, 1828). Although prevailing usage of the current name was conserved in 2015 by the International Commission on Zoological Nomenclature that used its plenary power to rule that the name Bulimus cylindricus Menke, 1828 is not invalid by reason of being a junior primary homonym of Bulimus cylindricus Gray, 1825.
