= Luchuena hachijoensis =

Conservation status
- Data Deficient (IUCN 2.3)

Scientific classification
- Kingdom: Animalia
- Phylum: Mollusca
- Class: Gastropoda
- Order: Stylommatophora
- Family: Enidae
- Genus: Luchuena
- Species: L. hachijoensis

Binomial name
- Luchuena hachijoensis Kuroda, 1945

Species of gastropod

Luchuena hachijoensis is a species of air-breathing land snails, terrestrial pulmonate gastropod mollusks in the family Enidae.

This species is endemic to Hachijōjima, Japan.
