= Turanena =

Scientific classification
- Kingdom: Animalia
- Phylum: Mollusca
- Class: Gastropoda
- Order: Stylommatophora
- Family: Enidae
- Genus: Turanena; Lindholm, 1922

Genus of molluscs

Turanena is a genus of gastropods belonging to the family Enidae.

The species of this genus are found in Western Mediterranean, near Black Sea.

Species:

- Turanena albolimbata (Lindholm, 1927)
- Turanena albrechti Rähle, 1988
- Turanena andronakii (Lindholm, 1913)
- Turanena bilgini Schütt & Sesen, 2002
- Turanena boamica Kuznetsov, 1999
- Turanena carpathia (O.Boettger, 1885)
- Turanena cochlicopoides E.Gittenberger & Menkhorst, 1993
- Turanena cognata (Lindholm, 1927)
- Turanena conelongata E.Gittenberger & Menkhorst, 1993
- Turanena conicula (E.Martens, 1882)
- Turanena demirsoyi Gümüş & Neubert, 2012
- Turanena diplochila (Möllendorff, 1901)
- Turanena elegantula Bank, Menkhorst & Neubert, 2016
- Turanena forcartiana P.Schnell, 1979
- Turanena hemmeni Bank & Butot, 1990
- Turanena herzi (O.Boettger, 1889)
- Turanena inversa Schileyko & Moisseeva, 1995
- Turanena katerinae E.Gittenberger, 1996
- Turanena kreitneri (Hilber, 1883)
- Turanena kuldshana (Martens, 1882)
- Turanena leptogyra (Lindholm, 1927)
- Turanena margaritae Schileyko & Moisseeva, 1989
- Turanena martensiana (Ancey, 1886)
- Turanena meshkovi Schileyko, 1984
- Turanena microconus (Möllendorff, 1902)
- Turanena pseudobscura Bank & Neubert, 2016
- Turanena schuschaensis (Kobelt, 1901)
- Turanena stschukini (Lindholm, 1927)
- Turanena tenuispira Schileyko, 1984
- Turanena tuccari E.Gittenberger, 1986
- Turanena zhoupengi L.Ge & J.He, 2017
- Turanena zilchi E.Gittenberger & Menkhorst, 1993
