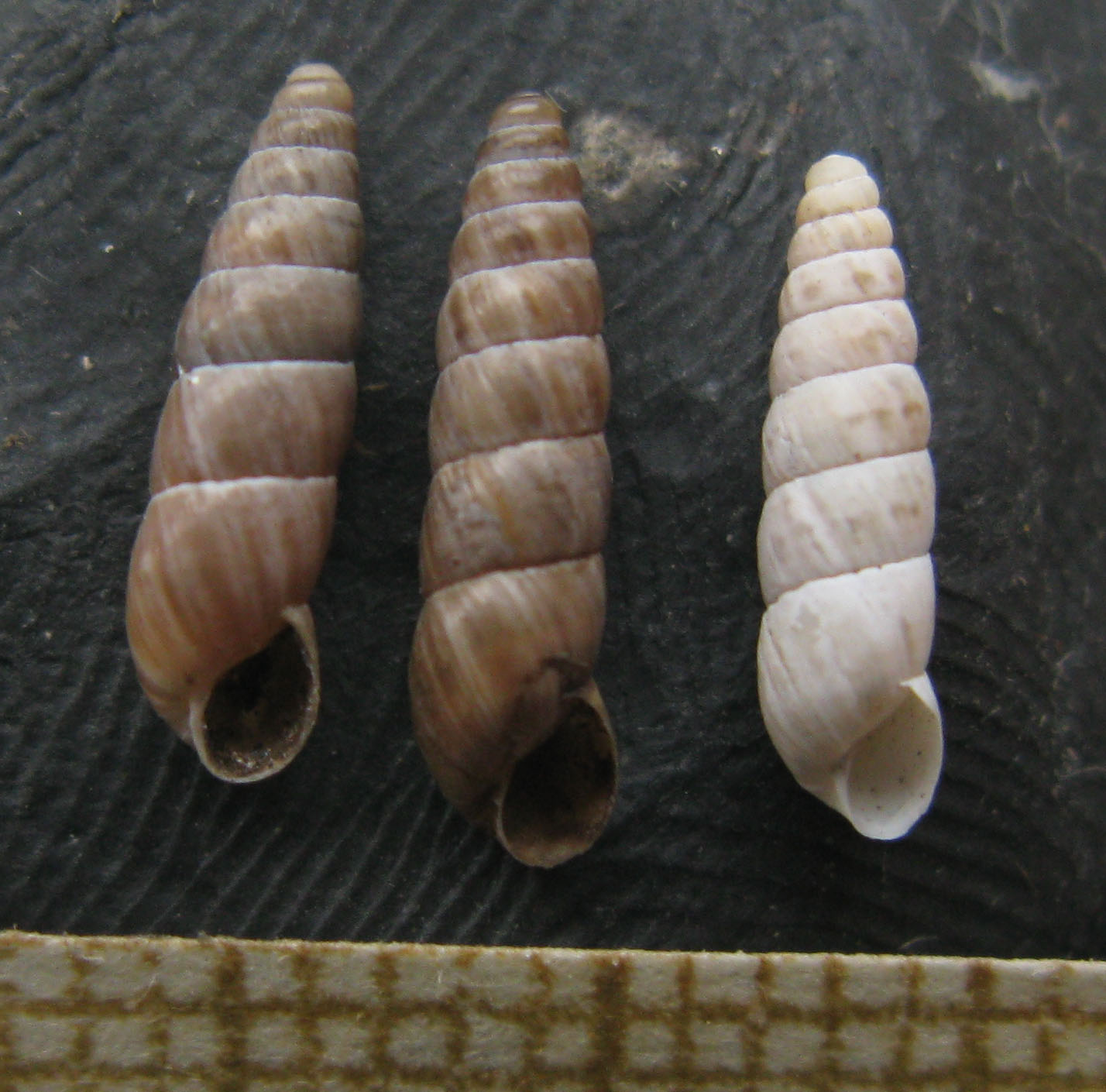
- Three shells of Brephulopsis subulata from Chatyr-Dag

Scientific classification
- Kingdom: Animalia
- Phylum: Mollusca
- Class: Gastropoda
- Order: Stylommatophora
- Family: Enidae
- Genus: Brephulopsis
- Species: B. subulata

Binomial name
- Brephulopsis subulata (Rossmässler, 1837)

Synonyms
- Bulimus subulatus Rossmässler, 1837; Ramusculus subulatus (Rossmässler, 1837)

= Brephulopsis subulata =

Species of gastropod

Brephulopsis subulata is a species of air-breathing land snail, a terrestrial pulmonate gastropod mollusc in the family Enidae.

== Distribution ==
This species is endemic to the Crimea (Ukraine).
