= Imparietula =

Scientific classification
- Kingdom: Animalia
- Phylum: Mollusca
- Class: Gastropoda
- Order: Stylommatophora
- Family: Enidae
- Genus: Imparietula; Lindholm, 1925

Genus of gastropods

Imparietula is a genus of gastropods belonging to the family Enidae.

The species of this genus are found in Southeastern Mediterranean.

Species:

- Imparietula altenai Gittenberger, 1967
- Imparietula inflexa Bank, Menkhorst & Neubert, 2016
- Imparietula lasistanica (Lindholm, 1914)
- Imparietula leucodon (L.Pfeiffer, 1846)
- Imparietula microdon Schütt, 1995
- Imparietula pelidne (Biggs, 1946)
- Imparietula ridvani Schütt, 1995
- Imparietula schelkovnikovi (Rosen, 1914)
