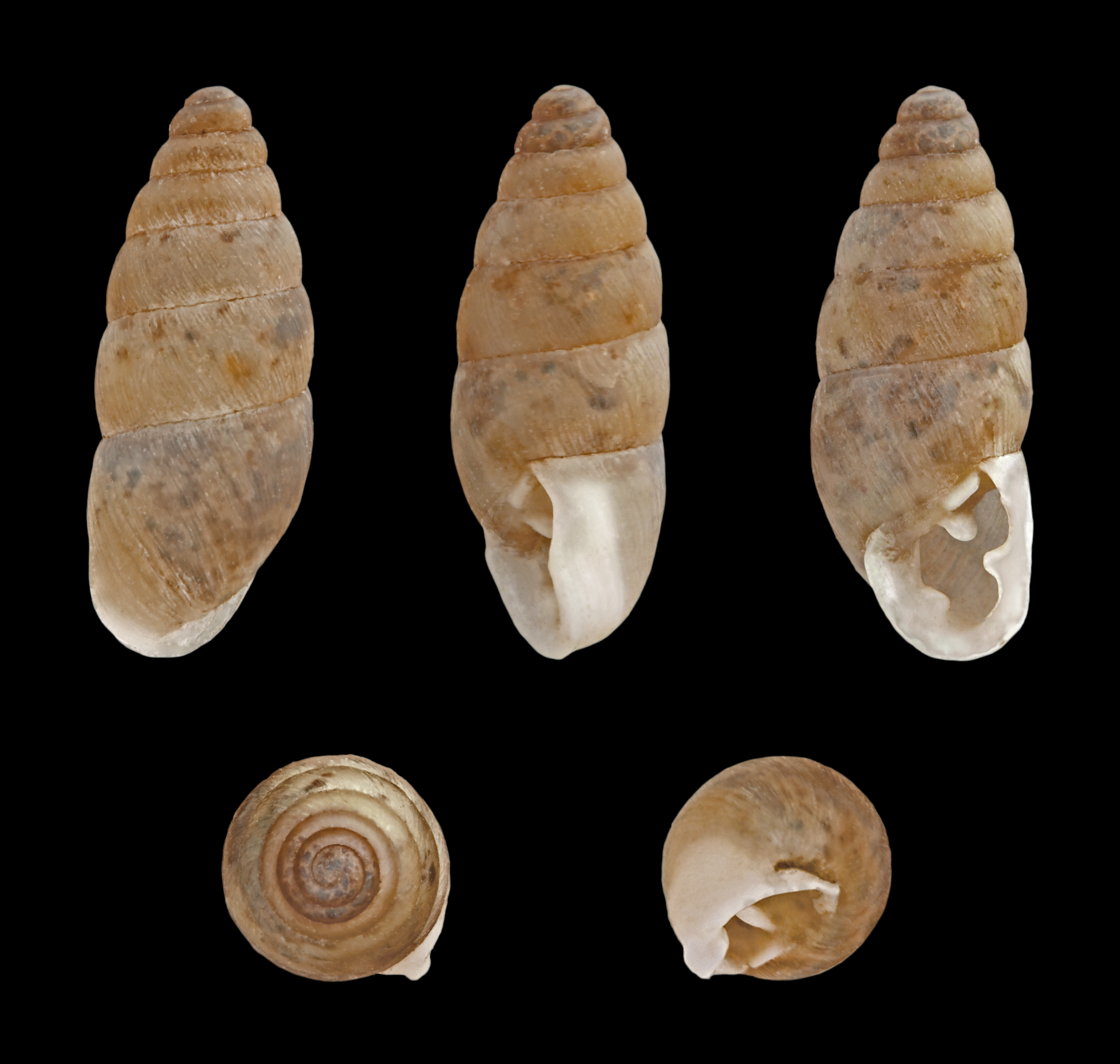
- Shell of Chondrula tridens

Conservation status
- Near Threatened (IUCN 3.1)

Scientific classification
- Kingdom: Animalia
- Phylum: Mollusca
- Class: Gastropoda
- Order: Stylommatophora
- Family: Enidae
- Genus: Chondrula
- Species: C. tridens

Binomial name
- Chondrula tridens (O. F. Müller, 1774)

Synonyms
- Buliminus (Chondrula) quinquedentatus var. nanus Retowski, 1886 (junior synonym); Buliminus (Chondrula) tridens O.F. Müller, 1774; Buliminus (Chondrula) tridens var. marcida O. Boettger, 1886 (junior synonym); Buliminus (Chondrulus) tridens (O.F. Müller, 1774); Buliminus (Chondrulus) tridens var. exiguus Retowski, 1914 (junior synonym); Buliminus (Chondrulus) tridens var. terkensis Retowski, 1914 (junior synonym); Bulimus albolimbatus L. Pfeiffer, 1848 (junior synonym); Bulimus bayeri L. Pfeiffer, 1858 (junior synonym); Bulimus obesa L. Pfeiffer, 1848 (junior synonym); Chondrula (Chondrula) tridens (O. F. Müller, 1774); Chondrula tridens var. tenuilabiata Lindholm, 1901 (junior synonym); Chondrulus tridens (O.F. Müller, 1774); Chondrulus tridens var. cuneolus Westerlund, 1897 (junior synonym); Chondrus bayeri (L. Pfeiffer, 1858); Chondrus bayeri var. kubanensis Mousson, 1863 (junior synonym); Chondrus tridens (O.F. Müller, 1774) (superseded generic combination); Chondrus tridens var. caucasicus Mousson, 1863 (junior synonym); Helix tridens O.F. Müller, 1774 (original combination); Pupa tridens (O. F. Müller, 1774) (superseded generic combination); Turbo tridens (O.F. Müller, 1778) (superseded combination; name suppressed by Opinion 335)

= Chondrula tridens =

Species of gastropod

Chondrula tridens is a species of air-breathing land snail, a terrestrial pulmonate gastropod mollusk in the family Enidae.

Subspecies

- Chondrula tridens eximia (Rossmässler, 1835)
- Chondrula tridens martynovi Gural-Sverlova & Gural, 2010
- Chondrula tridens tridens (O. F. Müller, 1774)

== Distribution ==
The distribution of this species is Pontic and southern-European.

This species occurs in:

- Czech Republic
- Ukraine
