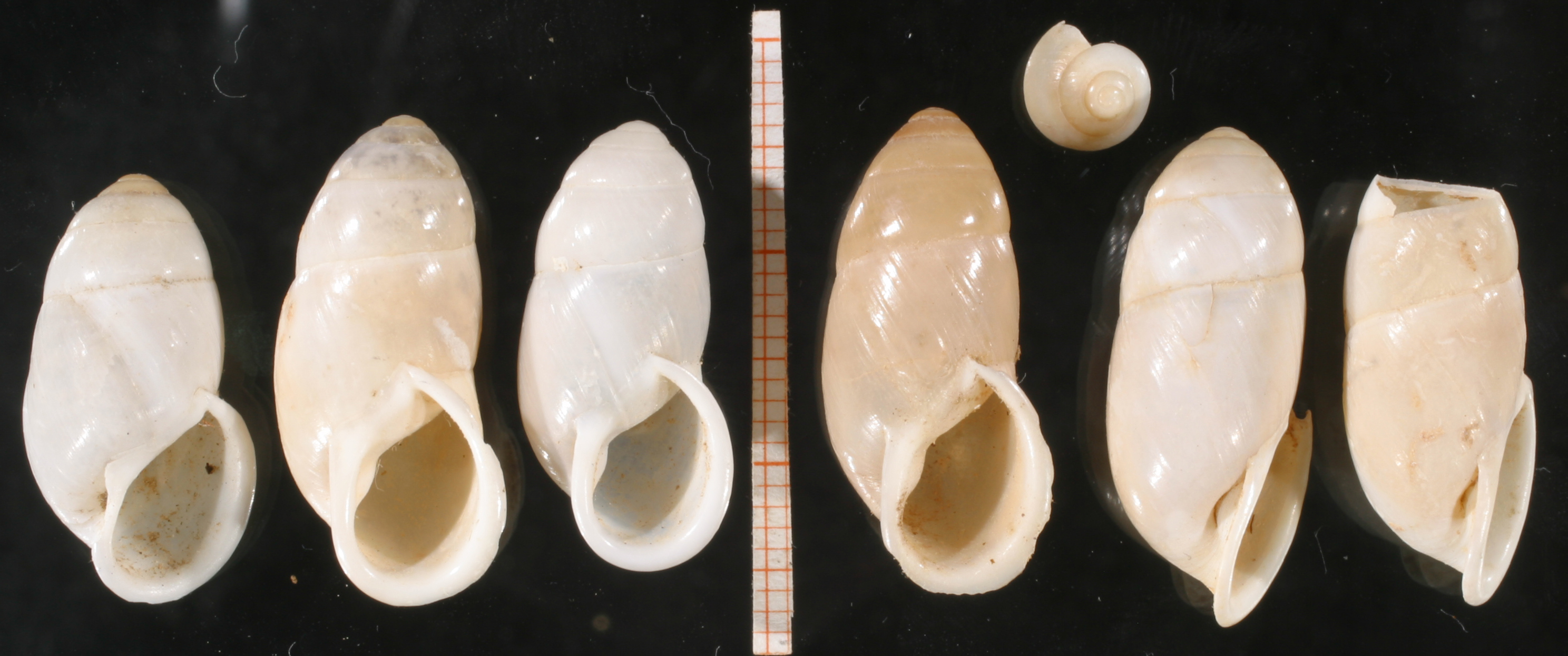
- A group of shells of Buliminus labrosus

Scientific classification
- Domain: Eukaryota
- Kingdom: Animalia
- Phylum: Mollusca
- Class: Gastropoda
- Order: Stylommatophora
- Family: Enidae
- Genus: Buliminus
- Species: B. labrosus

Binomial name
- Buliminus labrosus (Olivier, 1804)

= Buliminus labrosus =

Species of gastropod

Buliminus labrosus, is a species of air-breathing land snail, a terrestrial pulmonate gastropod mollusk in the family Enidae.

== Distribution ==
This species occurs in:

- Israel
