= Joseph Heller (zoologist) =

Joseph A. Heller
- יוסף הלר
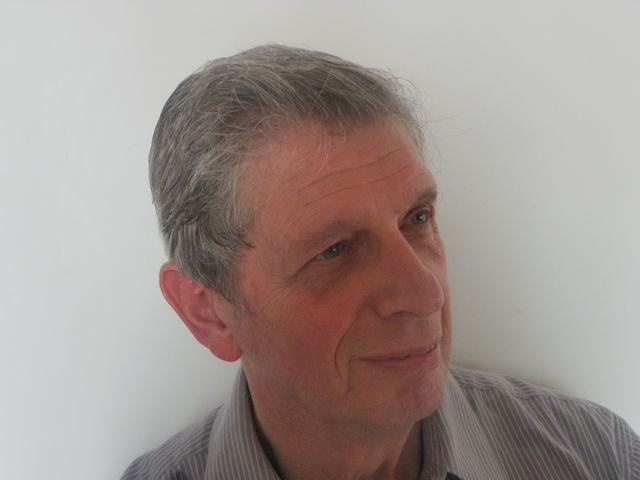
- Prof Joseph Heller Zoologist-Malacologist, faculty of Science, Hebrew University, Jerusalem
- Born: April 10, 1941 (age 85); Sydney,Australia
- Occupations: Zoologist, Malacologist

Joseph Alexander Heller (Hebrew: יוסף הלר; born April 10, 1941, in Sydney, Australia) is an Israeli zoologist-malacologist. Heller is an Associate Professor Emeritus at the Department of Ecology, Evolution and Behavior in the Silverman Institute of Life Sciences, Faculty of Science, at the Hebrew University of Jerusalem.

Heller immigrated to Israel in 1949. He received his B.Sc. in Life Science; Zoology and Microbiology in 1965, MSc in Zoology in 1968 and his PhD in 1972 at the Hebrew University of Jerusalem. His dissertation thesis is titled "Studies on the systematics distribution and ecology of the landsnail Buliminus in Israel".

Heller was a visiting scientist at the University of Liverpool, University of Bristol, University of Cape Town, and the State University of New York at Stony Brook. He published 4 books and over 100 articles. His books are the first ever on the land snails of Israel and on marine molluscs of the land of Israel.

== Research fields ==
Heller's cardinal studies concern the taxonomy, biogeography and reproductive biology of gastropods, of Israel and in general. Natural history of recent and fossil terrestrial and aquatic gastropods in various aspects such as resistance to heat and desiccation. Research results in developing a new bio-geographic methodology for modeling faunal responses to climatic gradients. Heller evolved and set priorities for planning strategies of conservation of terrestrial invertebrate faunas.

== Academic activities ==
Since 1979, Heller was appointed as an Academic curator of the National Molluscs Collection at the National Natural History Collections at the Hebrew University, Jerusalem. and holds this position till present. He participates in the Committee for Hebrew terms in Zoology and Biology at the Academy of the Hebrew Language and member in the Fauna Committee of the Israel Academy of Sciences and Humanities. As a veteran scientist, Heller was editor in chief of The Israel Journal of Zoology in the years 1989 -1990. During his career at the Hebrew University of Jerusalem, Heller was elected Head of the Department of Zoology. For his genuine research, decades of activities in the scientific community in general and in designing the scientific education in Israel, Heller was awarded in 2010 as an Honorary Member of the Zoological Society of Israel.

== Notable publications ==
- Heller, Joseph (1984). "Shell colours of desert landsnails". Malacologia. 25: 355–359.
- Heller, Joseph; U. N. Safriel (1993). "Setting priorities for the conservation of land snail faunas". In A.C. Van Bruggen & S. Wells (ed.). Biodiversity and Conservation of the Mollusca. Leiden: E. J. Brill. ISBN 9073348471.
- Heller, Joseph (1993). Land Snails of the Land of Israel, Natural History and a field guide. Ministry of Defence. OCLC 67380982. (in Hebrew). English edition published by Pensoft in 2009 ISBN 978-954-642-510-2.
- Heller, Joseph (2001). "Near East ecosystems, animal diversity". In S.A. Levin (ed.). Encyclopedia of Biodiversity, 4. San Diego: Academic Press. pp. 329–352. ISBN 978-0-08-091782-5.
- Heller, Joseph (2007). "A historic biogeography of the aquatic fauna of the Levant". Biological Journal of the Linnean Society. 92 (4): 625–639. doi:10.1111/j.1095-8312.2007.00850.x.
- Heller, Joseph (2011). Marine Molluscs of the Land of Israel - A Natural History (in Hebrew). Tzora: Alon-Sefer. ISBN 9789659097692.
- Heller, Joseph (2015). Sea Snails - A Natural History. Illustrator: Kurz Tuvia. Switzerland: Springer International Publishing. ISBN 9783319154510.
