= Pene galilaea =

Conservation status
- Critically Endangered (IUCN 2.3)

Scientific classification
- Kingdom: Animalia
- Phylum: Mollusca
- Class: Gastropoda
- Order: Stylommatophora
- Family: Enidae
- Genus: Pene
- Species: P. galilaea

Binomial name
- Pene galilaea Heller, 1972

Species of gastropod

Pene galilaea is a species of air-breathing land snail, a terrestrial pulmonate gastropod mollusk in the family Enidae.

This species is endemic to Israel.
