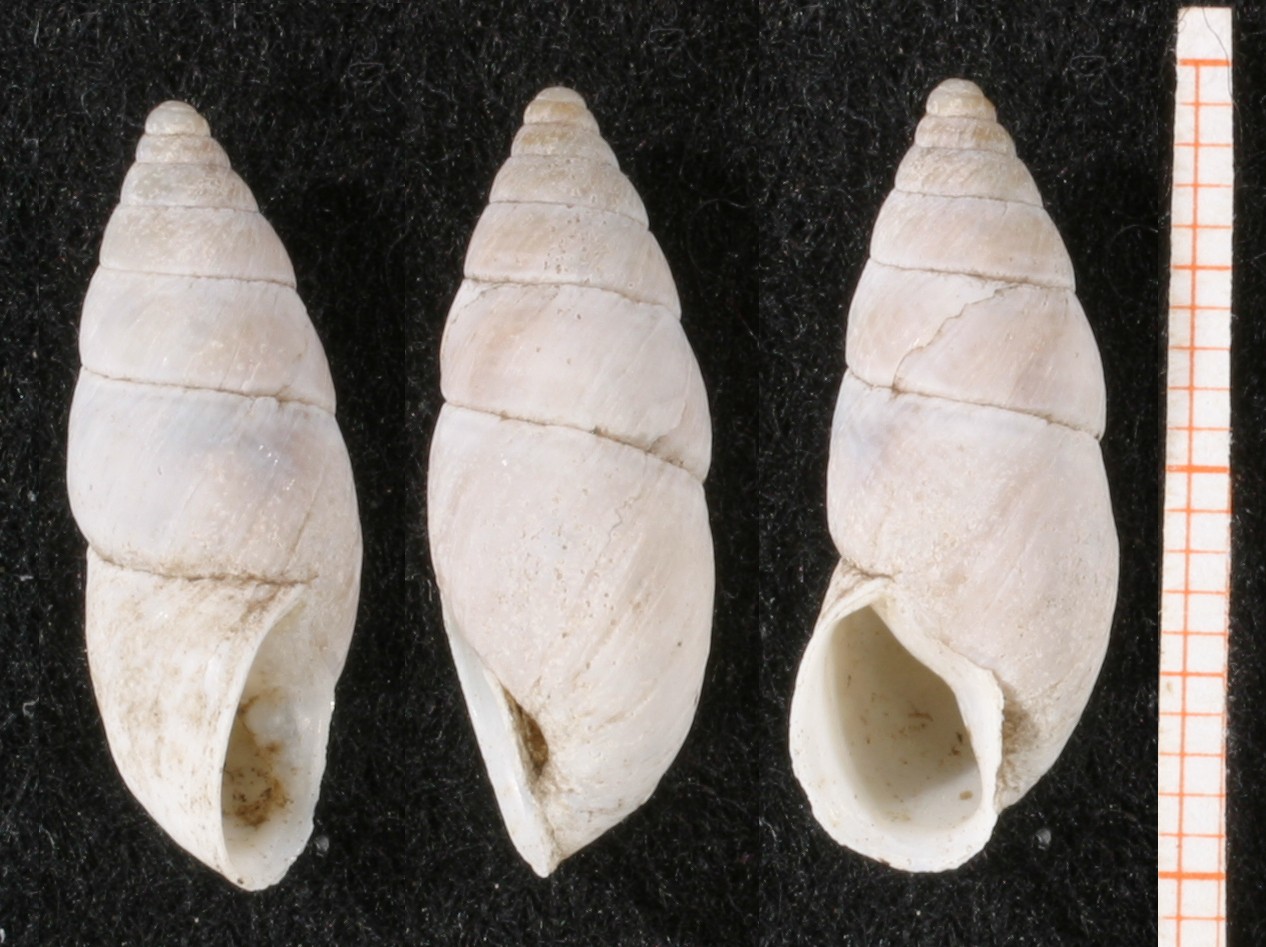
- Thoanteus gibber

Scientific classification
- Kingdom: Animalia
- Phylum: Mollusca
- Class: Gastropoda
- Order: Stylommatophora
- Family: Enidae
- Genus: Thoanteus; Lindholm, 1925

= Thoanteus =

Genus of molluscs

Thoanteus is a genus of gastropods belonging to the family Enidae.

The species of this genus are found in near Black Sea.

Species:

- Thoanteus corneus Hausdorf, 1993
- Thoanteus ferrarii Hausdorf, 1994
- Thoanteus gibber (Krynicki, 1833)
- Thoanteus zilchi Hausdorf, 1993
