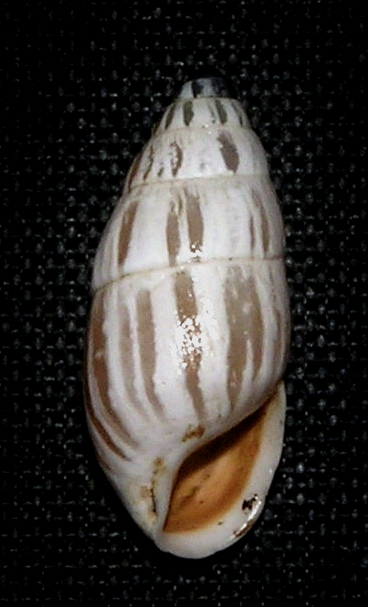
- Shell of Zebrina fasciolata

Scientific classification
- Kingdom: Animalia
- Phylum: Mollusca
- Class: Gastropoda
- Order: Stylommatophora
- Family: Enidae
- Genus: Zebrina
- Species: Z. fasciolata

Binomial name
- Zebrina fasciolata (Olivier, 1801)

Synonyms
- Buliminus hebraicus L. Pfeiffer, 1854 (junior synonym); Bulimus fasciolatus Olivier, 1801 (original combination); Bulimus fasciolatus var. maior Charpentier, 1847 (junior synonym); Bulimus fasciolatus var. piochardi Heynemann, 1870 (suspected synonym); Bulimus unicolor L. Pfeiffer, 1847 (invalid; not Krynicki, 1833); Zebrina (Zebrina) fasciolata (Olivier, 1801); Zebrina (Zebrina) fasciolata fasciolata (Olivier, 1801)

= Zebrina fasciolata =

Species of gastropod

Zebrina fasciolata is a medium-sized species of air-breathing land snail, a terrestrial pulmonate gastropod mollusc in the family Enidae.

== Description ==
The length of the shell attains 20 mm.

== Distribution ==
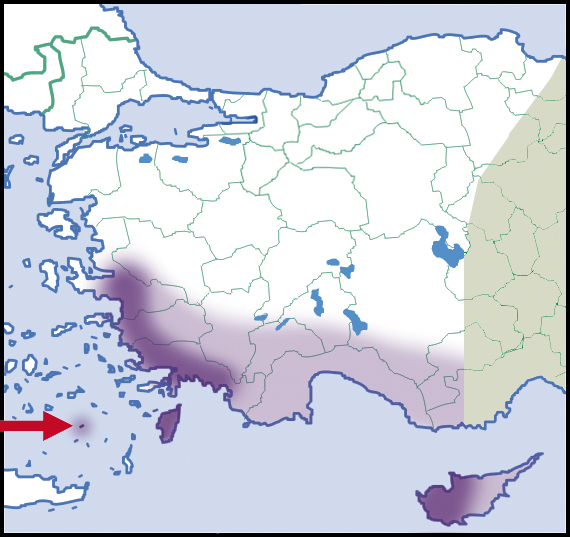
Distribution

This species occurs in Turkey and on islands in the Aegean Sea (Rhodos) and on Cyprus.
