= Zebrina spratti =

Scientific classification
- Kingdom: Animalia
- Phylum: Mollusca
- Class: Gastropoda
- Order: Stylommatophora
- Family: Enidae
- Genus: Zebrina
- Species: Z. spratti

Binomial name
- Zebrina spratti (L. Pfeiffer, 1846)

Synonyms
- Bulimus spratti L. Pfeiffer, 1846 (original combination)

Species of gastropod

Zebrina spratti is a medium-sized species of air-breathing land snail, a terrestrial pulmonate gastropod mollusc in the family Enidae.

== Distribution ==
This species occurs in Anatolia, Turkey
