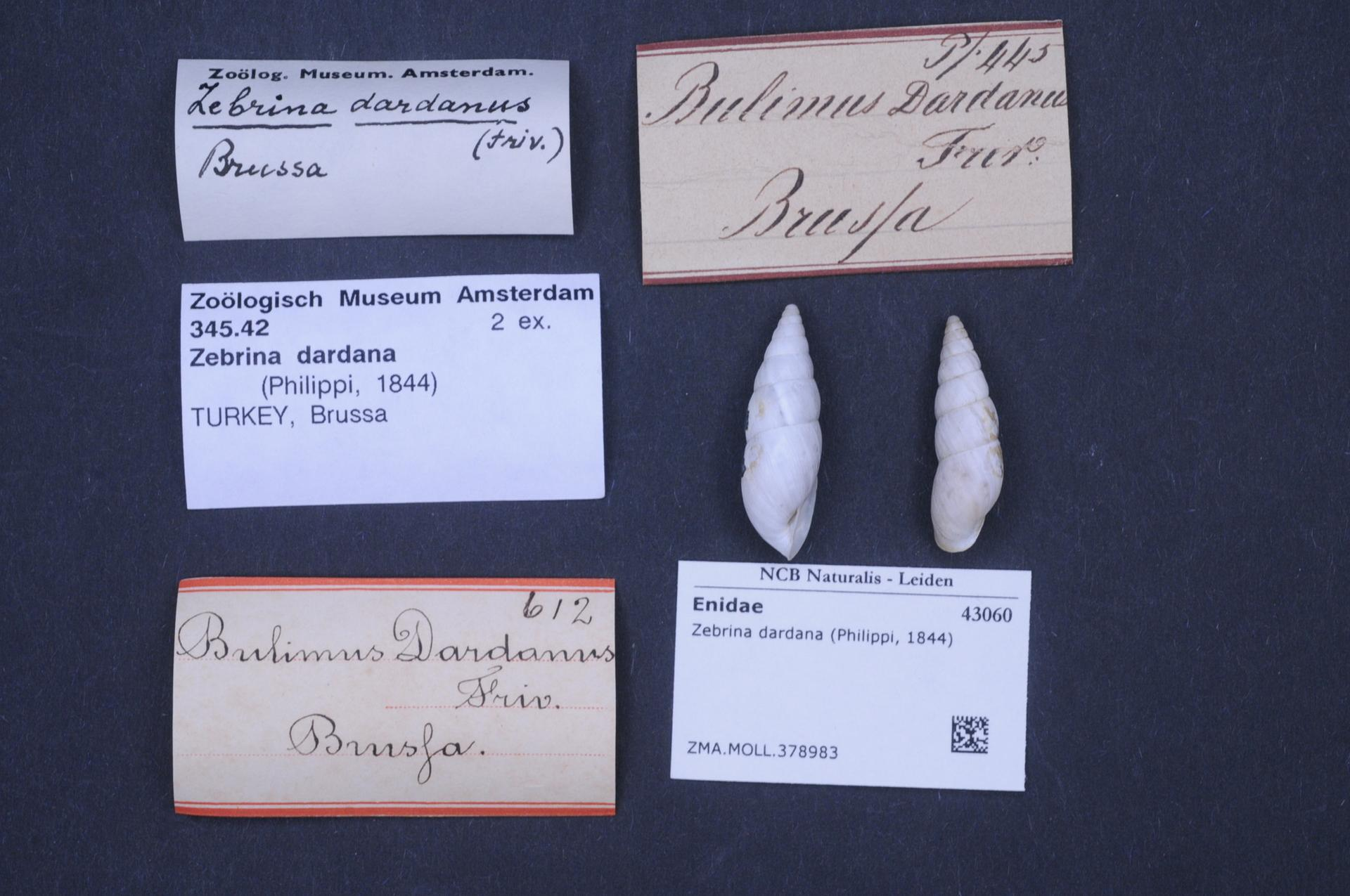
- Shell of Zebrina dardana (specimen at Naturalis Biodiversity Center)

Scientific classification
- Kingdom: Animalia
- Phylum: Mollusca
- Class: Gastropoda
- Order: Stylommatophora
- Family: Enidae
- Genus: Zebrina
- Species: Z. dardana

Binomial name
- Zebrina dardana (R. A. Philippi, 1844)

= Zebrina dardana =

Species of gastropod

Zebrina dardana is a medium-sized species of air-breathing land snail, a terrestrial pulmonate gastropod mollusc in the family Enidae.

== Description ==
The length of the shell attains 17.9 mm.

== Distribution ==
This species occurs in Turkey and Armenia.
