= Ayna (disambiguation) =

Ayna is a monotypic genus of air-breathing land snails.

Ayna may also refer to:

- Aýna, Albacete, a town in Castile-La Mancha, Spain
- Ayna District, a district of La Mar, Peru
- Ayna (band), a Turkish rock band
- Ayna TV, a former television station in Afghanistan
- Ayna, a character in Power of Three
- Ayna, a newspaper in Azerbaijan

== People ==
- Ahi Ayna (died 1362), founder of the Emirate of Erzincan
- Emine Ayna (born 1968), politician in Turkey of Zaza descent

== See also ==
- Aina (disambiguation)
- Anya (disambiguation)
