= Ayna =

Scientific classification
- Kingdom: Animalia
- Phylum: Mollusca
- Class: Gastropoda
- Order: Stylommatophora
- Family: Enidae
- Genus: Ayna; Páll-Gergely, 2009
- Species: A. mienisi

Binomial name
- Ayna mienisi (Gittenberger, 1986)

Genus of gastropods

Ayna is a monotypic genus of air-breathing land snails, terrestrial gastropod mollusks in the family Enidae. The sole species in the genus is Ayna mienisi. It was described as Zebrina (Ramusculus) mienisi. The genus Ramusculus however is a monotypic genus only distantly related to Ayna. The closest relative of Ayna is probably Clausilioides.

A. mienisi is a chirally enantiomorphic species. This means that some specimens have sinistral (left-coiled), others dextral (right-coiled) shells. The sinistral and dextral specimens form "clear" populations but can by found sympatrically as well. The sinistral specimens were described as a species (Ramusculus laevitortus Schütt, 1995) differs from the dextral Ramusculus mienisi. The species inhabits a relatively small area in Erzurum Province, northeastern Turkey.
