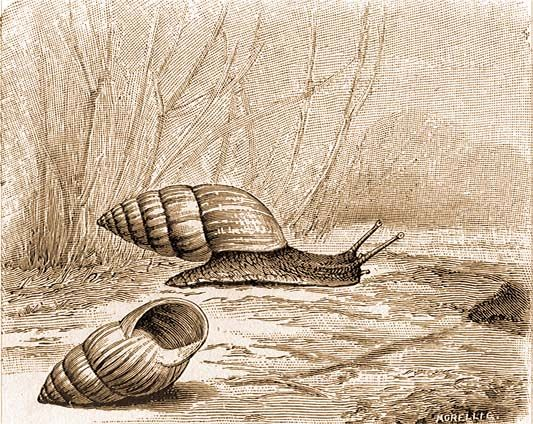

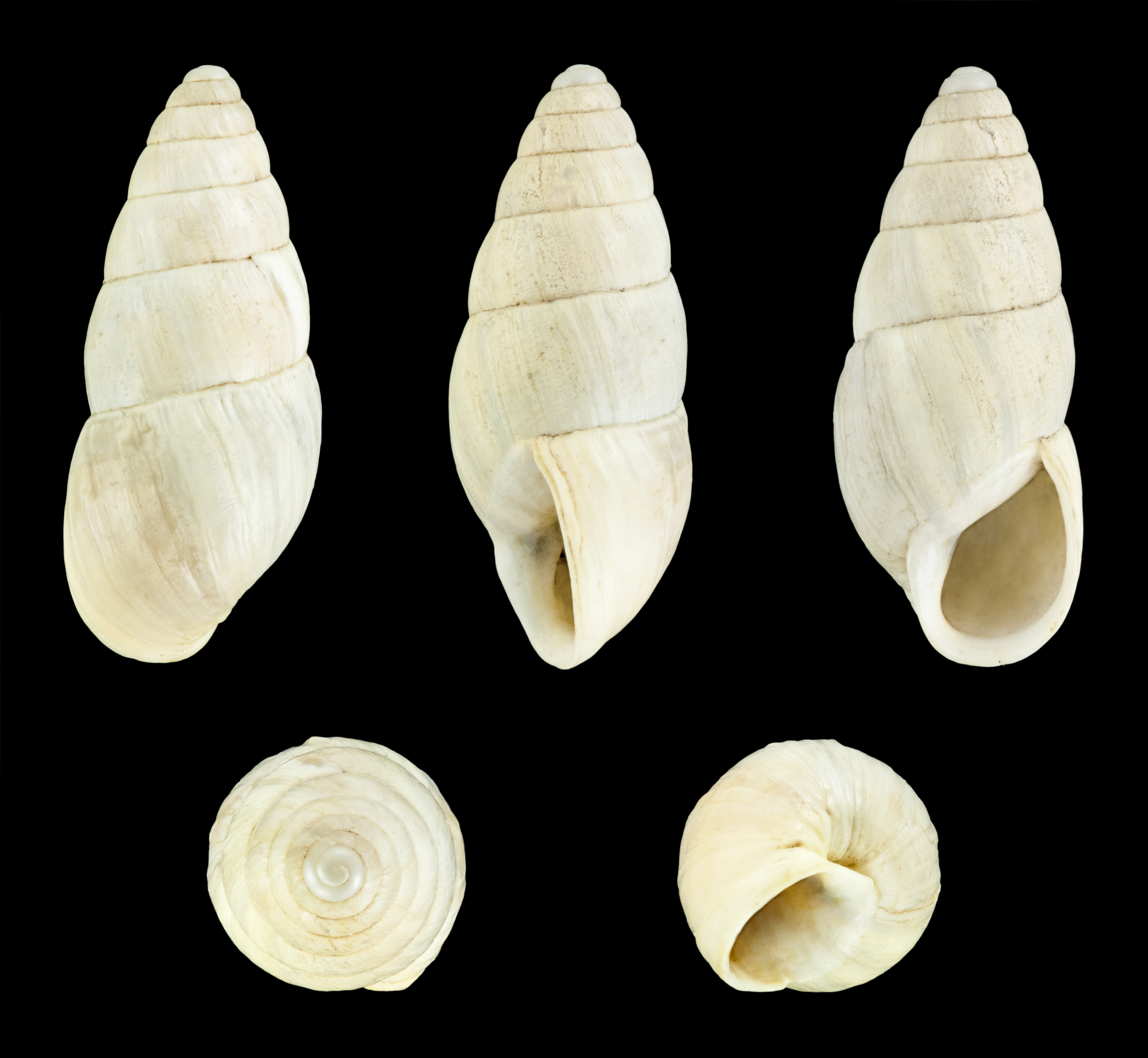

Scientific classification
- Domain: Eukaryota
- Kingdom: Animalia
- Phylum: Mollusca
- Class: Gastropoda
- Order: Stylommatophora
- Family: Enidae
- Genus: Zebrina
- Species: Z. detrita

Binomial name
- Zebrina detrita (Müller, 1774)

Synonyms
- Buliminus detritus (O. F. Müller, 1774) (superseded generic combination); Buliminus detritus croaticus Kormos, 1906 (suspected synonym); Bulimus radiatus Bruguière, 1789; Glischrus (Bulinus) radiatus S. Studer, 1820 (junior synonym); Helix detrita Müller, 1774; Zebrina (Zebrina) detrita (O. F. Müller, 1774)

= Zebrina detrita =

Species of gastropod

Zebrina detrita (also known as the striped wood snail, banded wood snail or leopard snail) is a medium-sized species of air-breathing land snail, a terrestrial pulmonate gastropod mollusc in the family Enidae.

Subspecies

- Zebrina detrita detrita (O. F. Müller, 1774)
- Zebrina detrita sallake Fehér & Erőss, 2009

== Description ==
The width of the shell is 12 mm. The height of the shell is 25 mm.

== Distribution ==
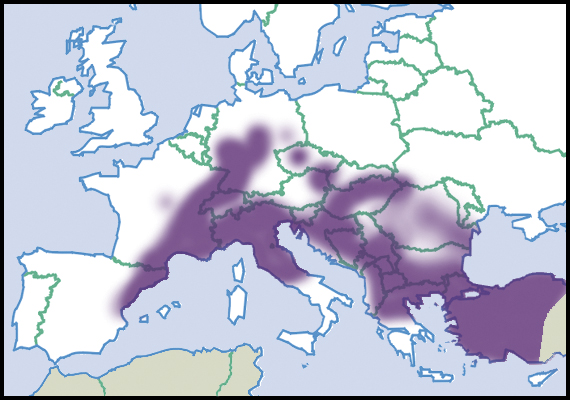
Distribution

The distribution of this species is Central European and Southern European.

- Czech Republic - endangered (EN) in Bohemia, critically endangered (CR) in Moravia
- Bulgaria
- Hungary
- Slovakia
- Ukraine
- Israel
- Italy

=== Habitat ===
This species lives in relatively dry areas.
