= Pseudochondrula =

Scientific classification
- Kingdom: Animalia
- Phylum: Mollusca
- Class: Gastropoda
- Order: Stylommatophora
- Family: Enidae
- Tribe: Enini
- Genus: Pseudochondrula; Hesse, 1933

Genus of land snails

Pseudochondrula is a genus of gastropods belonging to the family Enidae.

The species of this genus are found in Western Asia.

Species:

- Pseudochondrula armeniaca (Mortillet, 1854)
- Pseudochondrula arsaci Bank & Neubert, 2016
- Pseudochondrula bondouxi Bank & Neubert, 2016
- Pseudochondrula darii Bank & Neubert, 2016
- Pseudochondrula lederi (O.Boettger, 1883)
- Pseudochondrula orientalis Bank & Neubert, 2016
- Pseudochondrula purus (Westerlund, 1890)
- Pseudochondrula sinistrorsa Kokotschashvili & Schileyko, 1984
- Pseudochondrula tuberifera (O.Boettger, 1879)
