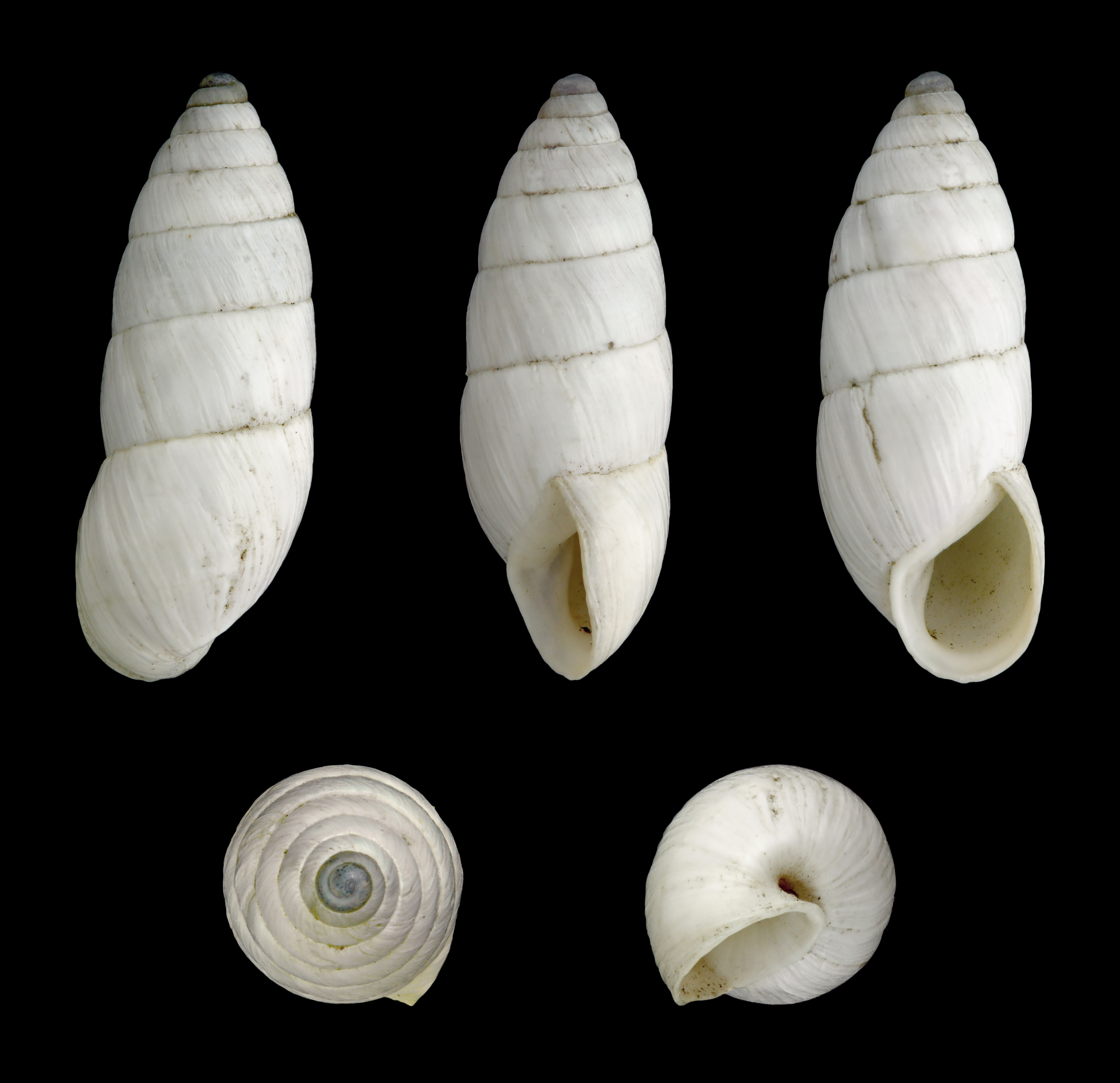
- Brephulopsis bidens

Scientific classification
- Kingdom: Animalia
- Phylum: Mollusca
- Class: Gastropoda
- Order: Stylommatophora
- Family: Enidae
- Genus: Brephulopsis; Lindholm, 1925

Synonyms
- Ramusculus Lindholm, 1925; Zebrina (Brephulopsis) Lindholm, 1925; Zebrina (Ramusculus) Lindholm, 1925

= Brephulopsis =

Genus of molluscs

Brephulopsis is a genus of gastropods belonging to the family Enidae.

The species of this genus are found near The Black Sea.

== Species ==
The following species are recognised in the genus Brephulopsis:

- Brephulopsis bidens (Krynicki, 1833)
- Brephulopsis cylindrica (Menke, 1828)
- Brephulopsis subulata (Rossmässler, 1837)
