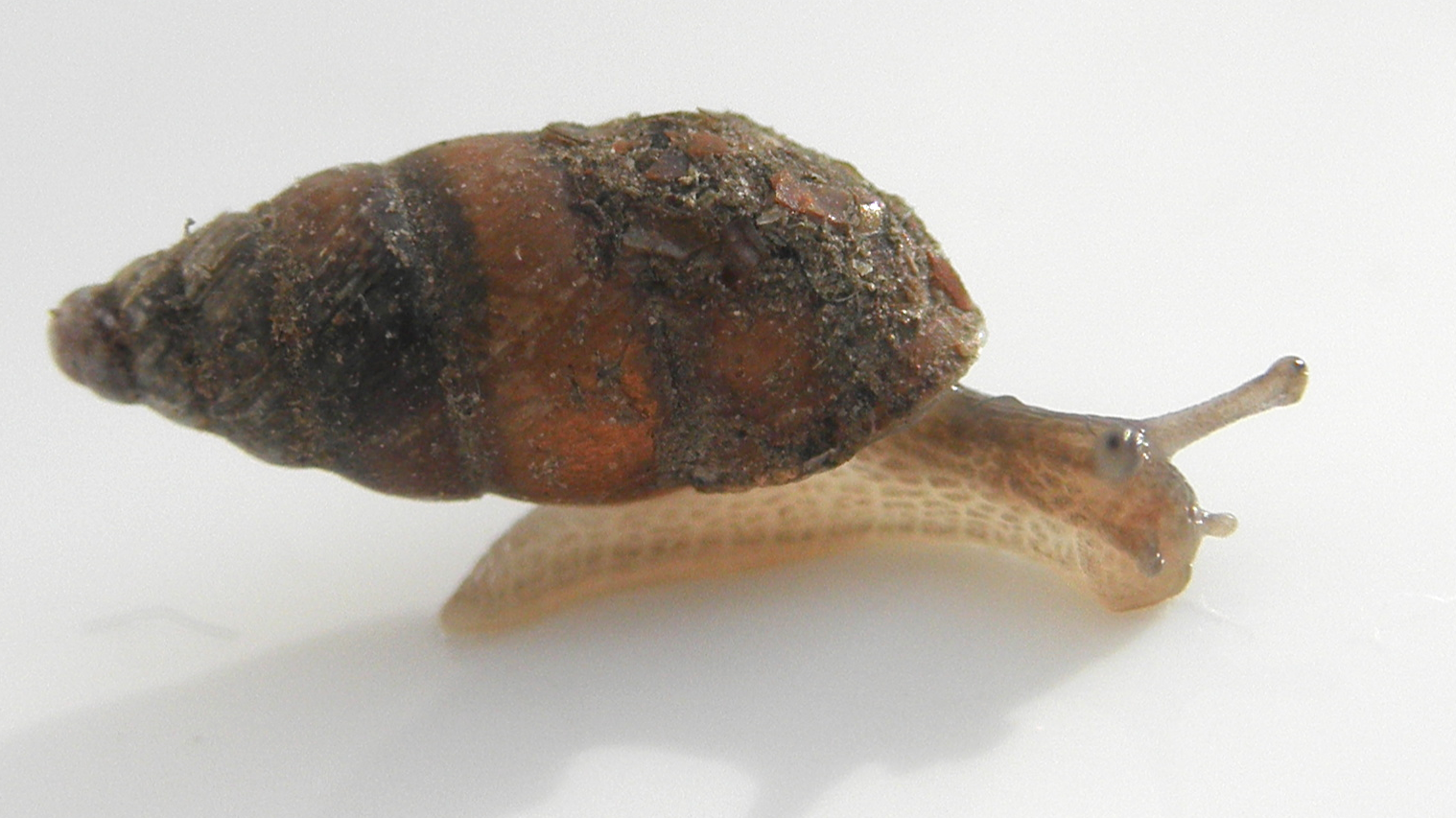
- Left side view of a live Merdigera obscura.
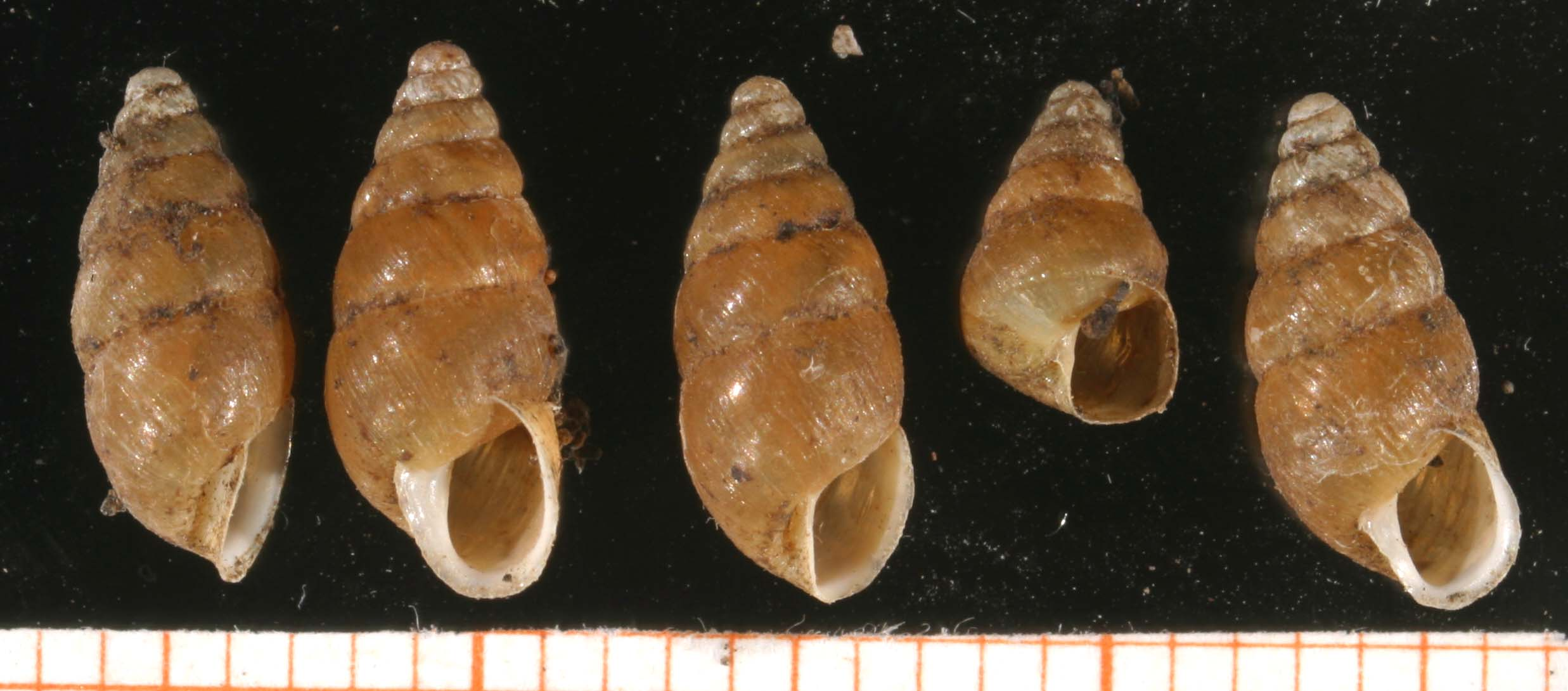
- Merdigera obscura shells

Scientific classification
- Kingdom: Animalia
- Phylum: Mollusca
- Class: Gastropoda
- Order: Stylommatophora
- Infraorder: Pupilloidei
- Superfamily: Pupilloidea
- Family: Enidae
- Genus: Merdigera; Held, 1838

Type species
- Helix obscura O. F. Müller, 1774

= Merdigera =

Genus of gastropods

Merdigera is a genus of small air-breathing land snails, terrestrial pulmonate gastropod mollusks in the subfamily Eninae of the family Enidae.

== Species ==
Species in this genus include:

- Merdigera invisa Kijashko, 2006
- Merdigera obscura (Müller, 1774) - the type species of the genus Merdigera
