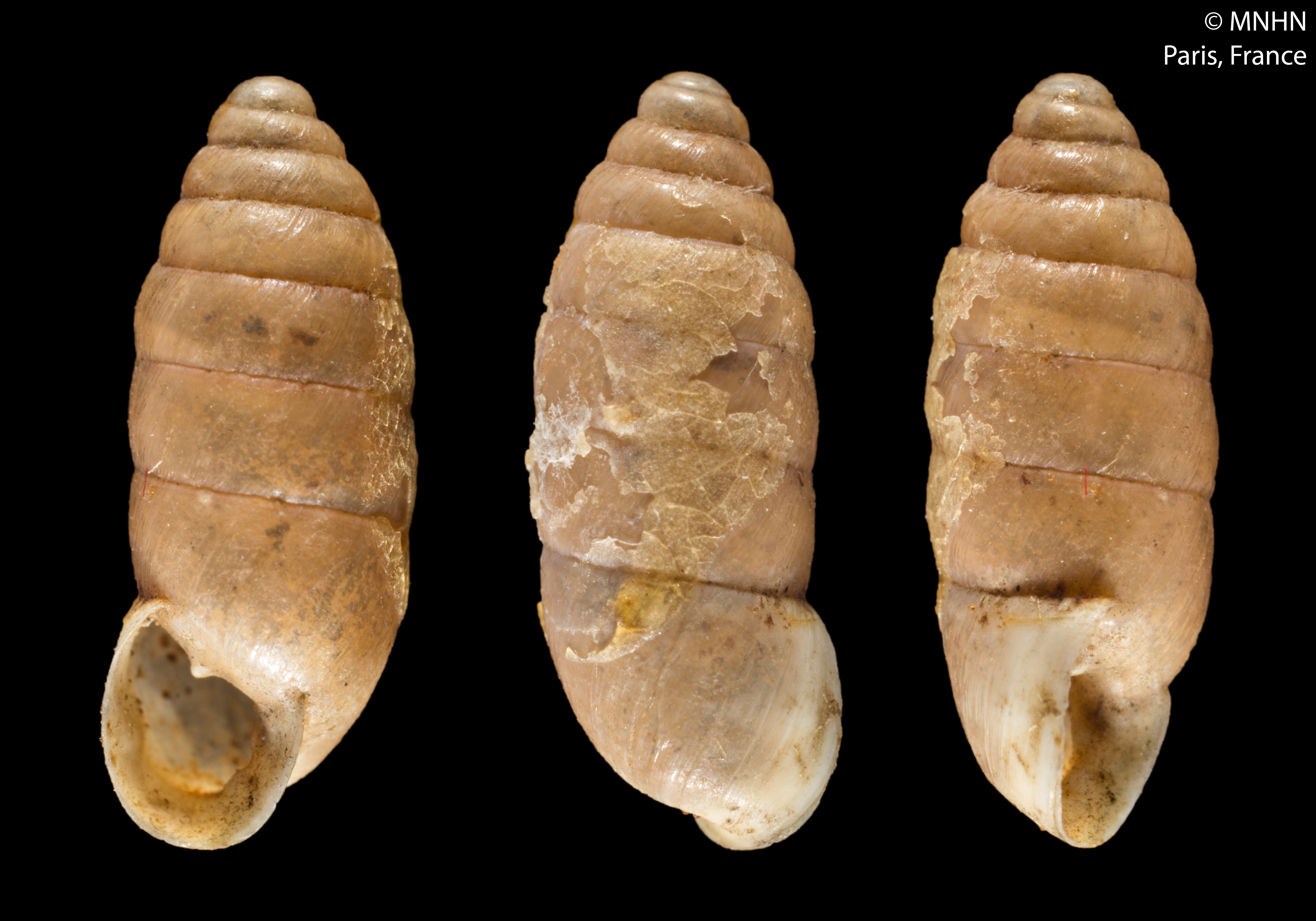
- Shell of Jaminia quadridens (syntype at MNHN, Paris)

Scientific classification
- Kingdom: Animalia
- Phylum: Mollusca
- Class: Gastropoda
- Order: Stylommatophora
- Infraorder: Pupilloidei
- Superfamily: Pupilloidea
- Family: Enidae
- Genus: Jaminia; Risso, 1826

Synonyms
- Chondritortus Monterosato, 1908; Ena (Quadridentiana) Caziot, 1910 junior subjective synonym; Jaminia (Jaminia) Risso, 1826

= Jaminia =

Genus of gastropods

Jaminia is a genus of air-breathing land snails, terrestrial pulmonate gastropod mollusks in the subfamily Eninae of the family Enidae.

== Characteristics ==
(Original description in French) The shell is elongated and turreted, featuring a distinct suture. The peritreme (the margin of the aperture) is complete on the right, the left, and across the front; it is slightly joined toward its posterior section.

== Species ==
- Jaminia loewii (Philippi, 1844)
- Jaminia quadridens (O. F. Müller, 1774)
- Jaminia thiesseana (Westerlund & Blanc, 1879)

Species brought into synonymy

- Jaminia corrugata Preston, 1912: synonym of Nesopupa corrugata (Preston, 1912): synonym of Insulipupa corrugata (Preston, 1912) (original combination)
- Jaminia desiderata Preston, 1911: synonym of Lauria desiderata (Preston, 1911)
- Jaminia heterostropha Risso, 1826: synonym of Jaminia quadridens quadridens (O. F. Müller, 1774) (junior synonym)
- Jaminia multidentata Risso, 1826: synonym of Granaria variabilis (Draparnaud, 1801) (junior synonym)
- Jaminia niso Risso, 1826: synonym of Jaminia quadridens quadridens (O. F. Müller, 1774) (junior synonym)
- Jaminia proscripta E. A. Smith, 1905: synonym of Nesopupa proscripta (E. A. Smith, 1905) (original combination)
- Jaminia quinquelamellata Risso, 1826: synonym of Solatopupa similis (Bruguière, 1792) (junior synonym)
- Jaminia septemdentata Risso, 1826: synonym of Chondrina avenacea avenacea (Bruguière, 1792) (junior synonym)
