= Clausilioides =

Scientific classification
- Kingdom: Animalia
- Phylum: Mollusca
- Class: Gastropoda
- Order: Stylommatophora
- Family: Enidae
- Genus: Clausilioides; Lindholm, 1925

Genus of gastropods

Clausilioides is a genus of air-breathing land snails, terrestrial pulmonate gastropod mollusks in the family Enidae. This species in this genus are obligate rock-dwellers that inhabit a limited area in northeastern Turkey.

== Species ==
Species within the genus Clausilioides include:

- Clausilioides biplicatus (Retowski, 1889)
- Clausilioides filifer (Lindholm, 1913)
