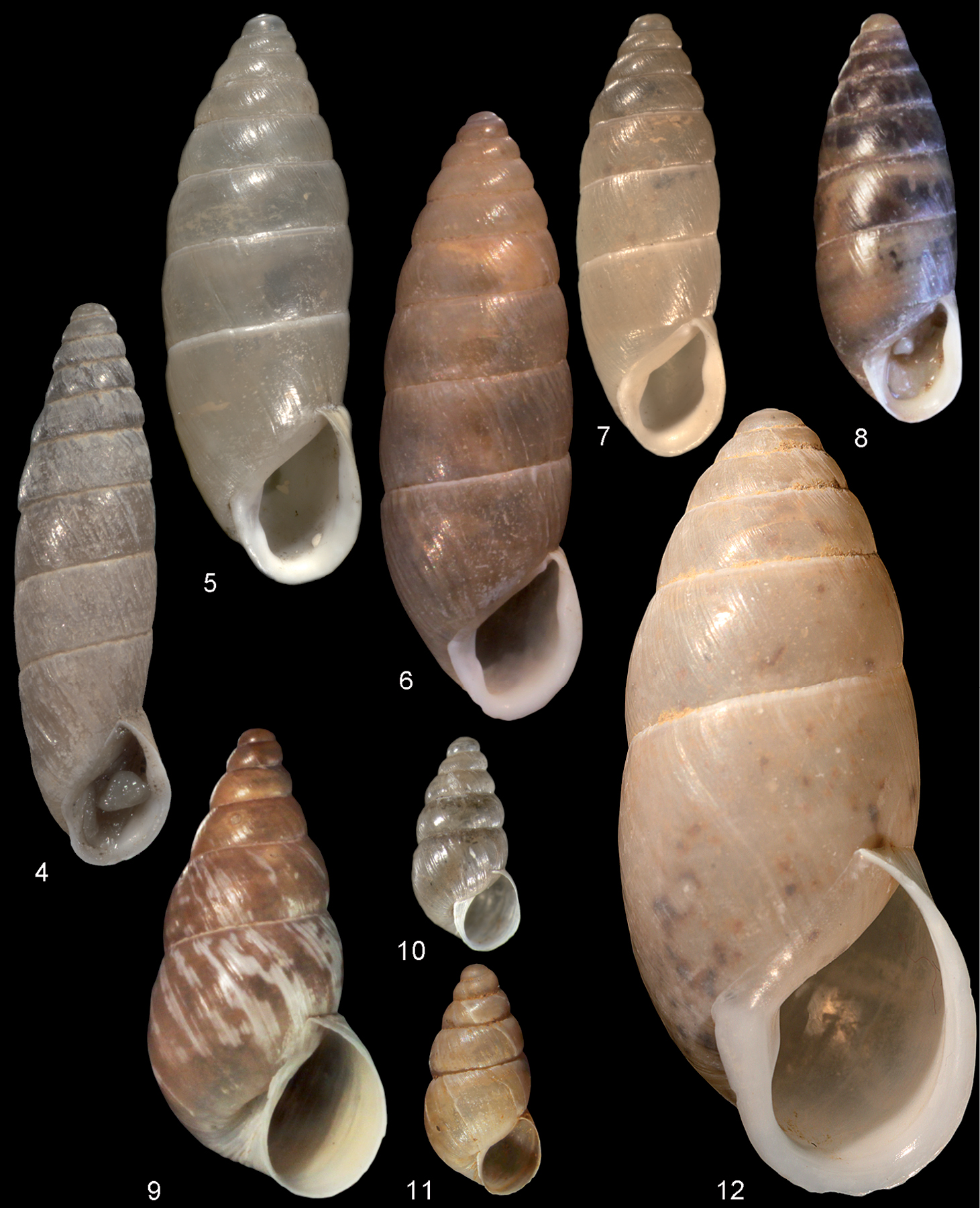
- Meijeriella canaliculata

Scientific classification
- Domain: Eukaryota
- Kingdom: Animalia
- Phylum: Mollusca
- Class: Gastropoda
- Order: Stylommatophora
- Family: Enidae
- Genus: Meijeriella; Bank, 1985

= Meijeriella =

Genus of molluscs

Meijeriella is a genus of gastropods belonging to the family Enidae.

The species of this genus are found in the Balkans.

Species:

- Meijeriella canaliculata Bank, 1985
- Meijeriella frivaldskyi (Pfeiffer, 1847)
- Meijeriella yildirimi (Schütt, 1995)
