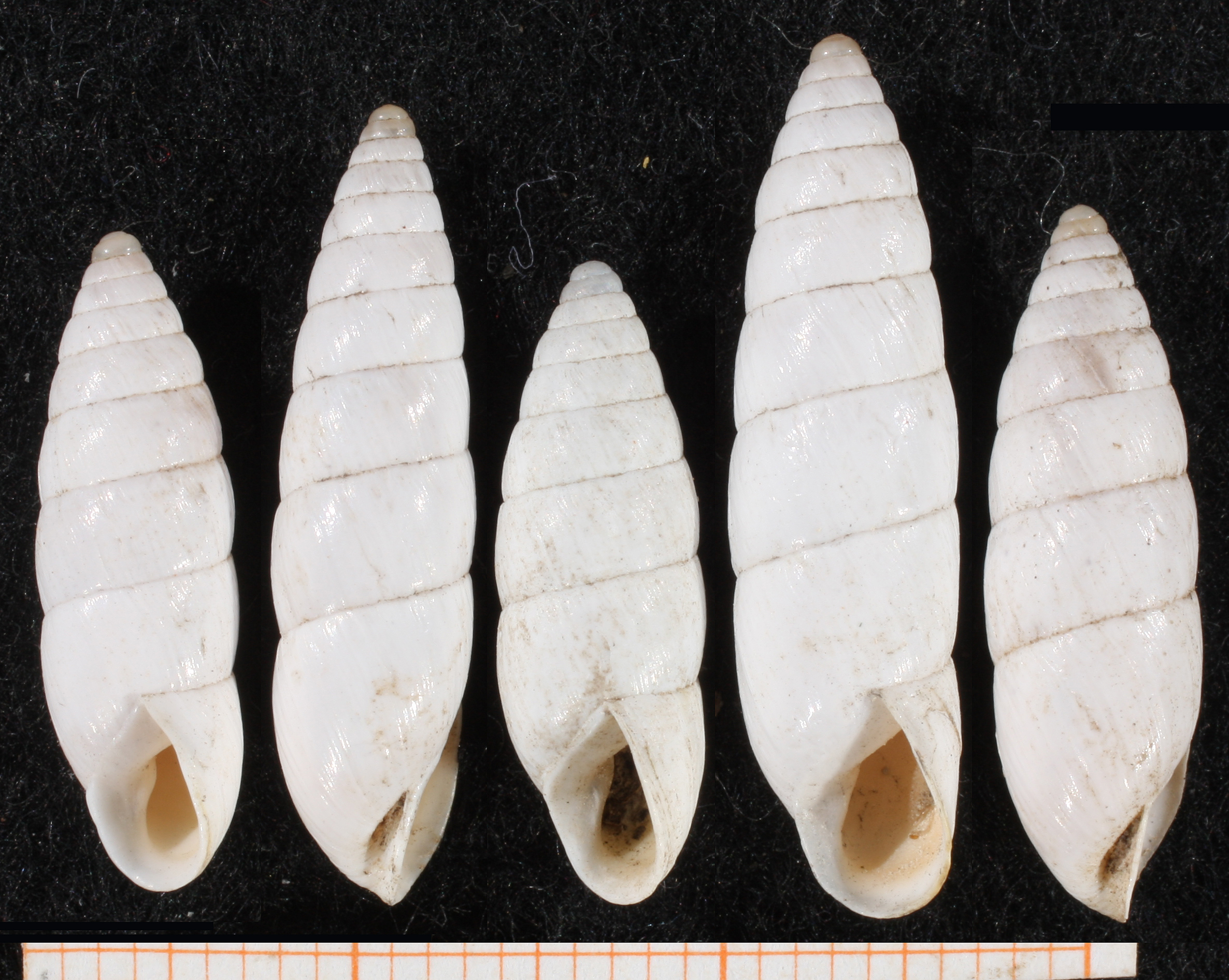
- Leucomastus varnensis

Scientific classification
- Kingdom: Animalia
- Phylum: Mollusca
- Class: Gastropoda
- Order: Stylommatophora
- Family: Enidae
- Genus: Leucomastus; A. J. Wagner, 1928

= Leucomastus =

Genus of molluscs

Leucomastus is a genus of gastropods belonging to the family Enidae.

The species of this genus are found near Black Sea.

Species:

- Leucomastus dardanus (Philippi, 1844)
- Leucomastus eburnea (Pfeiffer, 1842)
- Leucomastus kindermanni (Pfeiffer, 1853)
- Leucomastus varnensis (Pfeiffer, 1847)
