= Ljudmilena =

Scientific classification
- Kingdom: Animalia
- Phylum: Mollusca
- Class: Gastropoda
- Order: Stylommatophora
- Family: Enidae
- Genus: Ljudmilena; Schileyko, 1984

Genus of land snails

Ljudmilena is a genus of gastropods belonging to the family Enidae.

The species of this genus are found at the coast of Black Sea.

Species:

- Ljudmilena araxena (Lindholm, 1923)
- Ljudmilena bayburti Schütt, 2004
- Ljudmilena callosa Bank, Menkhorst & Neubert, 2016
- Ljudmilena cespita (Mortillet, 1854)
- Ljudmilena euxina (Retowski, 1883)
- Ljudmilena excellens (Retowski, 1889)
- Ljudmilena mariannae Bank, Menkhorst & Neubert, 2016
- Ljudmilena sieversi (Mousson, 1873)
- Ljudmilena tricollis (Mousson, 1876)
