= Rhabdoena =

Scientific classification
- Kingdom: Animalia
- Phylum: Mollusca
- Class: Gastropoda
- Order: Stylommatophora
- Family: Enidae
- Genus: Rhabdoena; Kobelt & Möllendorff, 1902

Genus of molluscs

Rhabdoena is a genus of gastropods belonging to the family Enidae.

The species of this genus are found in Aegean Sea.

Species:

- Rhabdoena armenica (Nägele, 1903)
- Rhabdoena cosensis (Reeve, 1849)
- Rhabdoena gosteliae Gümüş & Neubert, 2012
- Rhabdoena gostelii Gümüs & Neubert, 2012
- Rhabdoena mirifica (Bank & Menkhorst, 1992)
- Rhabdoena stokesi (Boettger, 1885)
- Rhabdoena zasiensis (Bank & Menkhorst, 1992)
