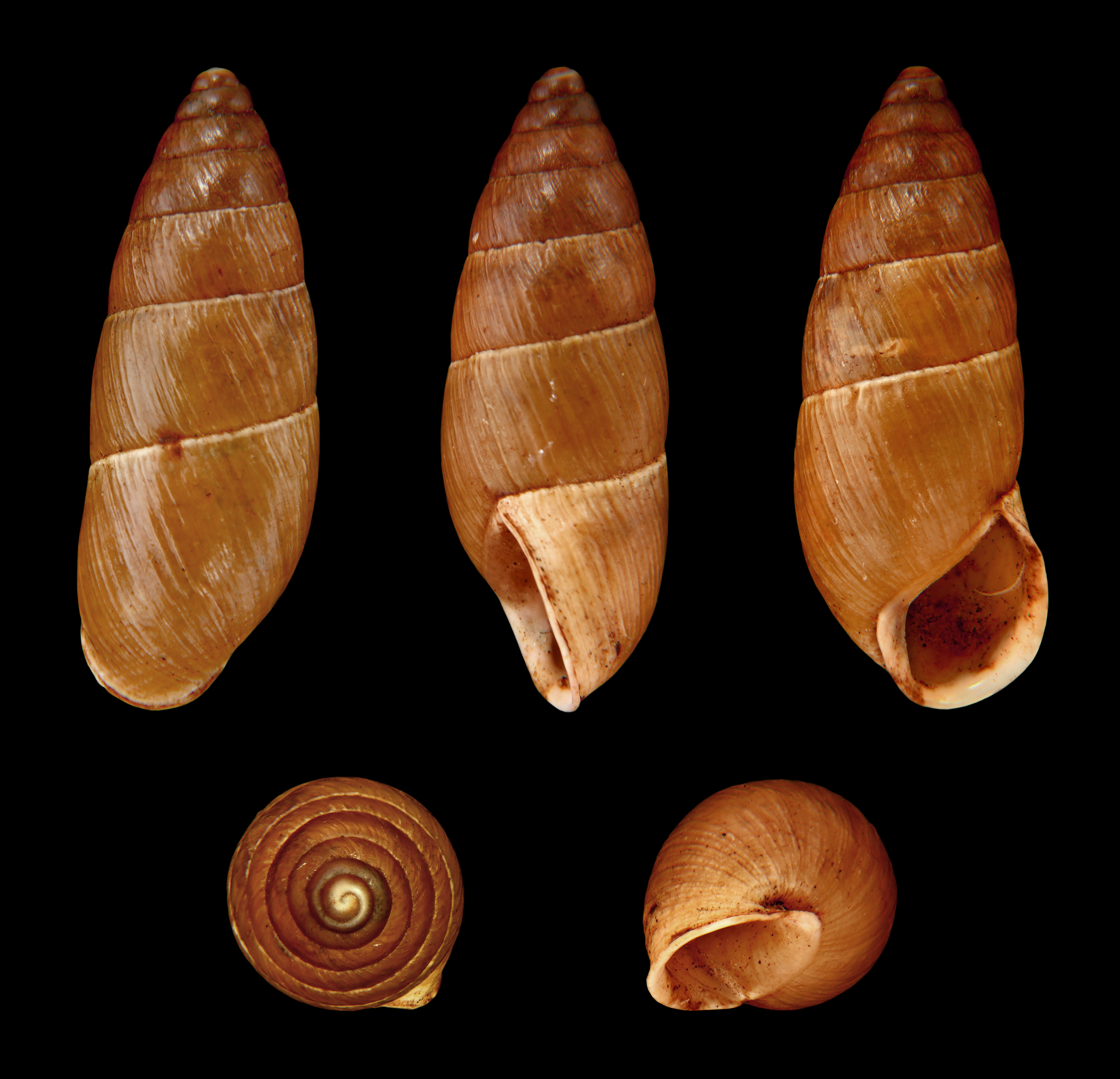
- Mastus cretensis

Scientific classification
- Kingdom: Animalia
- Phylum: Mollusca
- Class: Gastropoda
- Order: Stylommatophora
- Family: Enidae
- Genus: Mastus; Beck, 1837

= Mastus =

Genus of gastropods

Mastus is a genus of air-breathing land snails, terrestrial pulmonate gastropod mollusks in the family Enidae.

== Species ==
Species:

- Mastus abundans Maassen, 1995
- Mastus alpicola (M.Kimakowicz, 1890)
- Mastus amenazada Welter-Schultes, 1999
- Mastus anatolicus (Issel, 1865)
- Mastus athensis (L.Pfeiffer, 1847)
- Mastus bielzi (M.Kimakowicz, 1890)
- Mastus butoti Maassen, 1995
- Mastus carneolus (Mousson, 1863)
- Mastus caucasica (L.Pfeiffer, 1852)
- Mastus claudia Maassen & Welter-Schultes, 1998
- Mastus cretensis (L.Pfeiffer, 1846)
- Mastus dirphicus (Blanc, 1879)
- Mastus emarginatus (Deshayes, 1835)
- Mastus etuberculatus (Frauenfeld, 1867)
- Mastus gittenbergeri Maassen, 1995
- Mastus grandis (Mousson, 1859)
- Mastus hemmeni Maassen, 1995
- Mastus ierapetranus Maassen, 1995
- Mastus itanosensis Maassen, 1995
- Mastus oligogyrus (O.Boettger, 1898)
- Mastus olivaceus (L.Pfeiffer, 1846)
- Mastus procax Maassen, 1995
- Mastus pupa (Linnaeus, 1758)
- Mastus pusio (Broderip, 1836)
- Mastus riedeli Maassen, 1995
- Mastus rossmaessleri (L.Pfeiffer, 1847)
- Mastus sitiensis Maassen, 1995
- Mastus sphakiotus Maassen, 1995
- Mastus subaii Maassen, 1995
- Mastus transsylvanicus M.Kimakowicz, 1883
- Mastus unius (O.Boettger, 1885)
- Mastus venerabilis (L.Pfeiffer, 1853)
- Mastus violaceus Maassen, 1995
