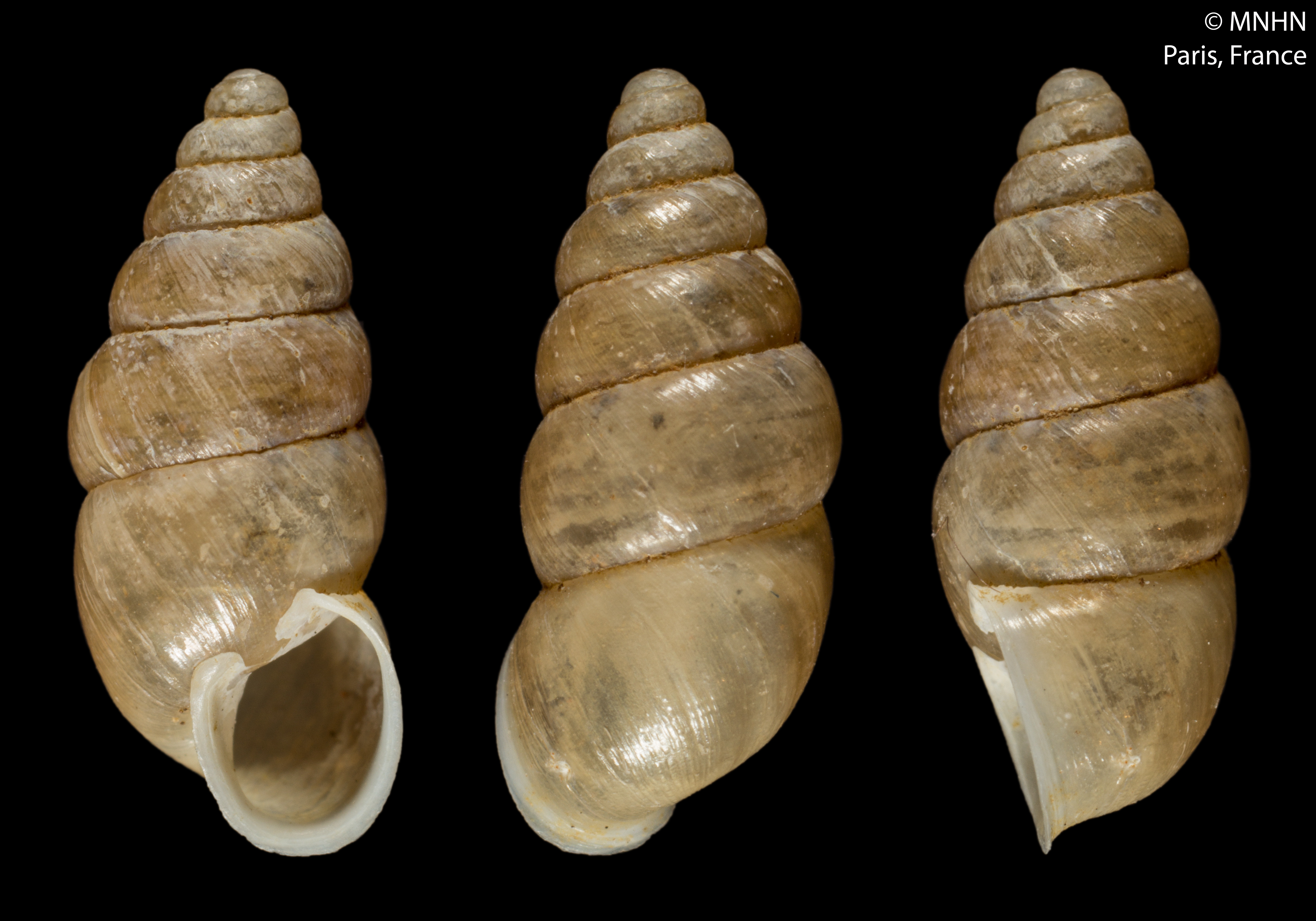
- Shell of Apoecus huberi (holotype at MNHN, Paris)

Scientific classification
- Kingdom: Animalia
- Phylum: Mollusca
- Class: Gastropoda
- Order: Stylommatophora
- Infraorder: Pupilloidei
- Superfamily: Pupilloidea
- Family: Enidae
- Genus: Apoecus; Möllendorff, 1902

Type species
- Buliminus colonus Möllendorff, 1895

Synonyms
- Buliminus (Apoecus) Möllendorff, 1902 (original rank); Buliminus (Coccoderma) Möllendorff, 1902 (the genus group name Coccoderma Möllendorff, 1902 is unavailable); Coccoderma Möllendorff, 1902 (invalid: junior homonym of Coccoderma Zittel, 1887 [Pisces])

= Apoecus =

Genus of gastropods

Apoecus is a genus of air-breathing land snails, terrestrial pulmonate gastropod mollusks in the subfamily Eninae of the family Enidae.

== Species ==
Species within the genus Apoecus include:

- Apoecus abbreviata (Bavay & Dautzenberg, 1915)
- Apoecus albescens (Möllendorff, 1884)
- Apoecus apertus (E. von Martens, 1863)
- Apoecus chineensis (Bavay & Dautzenberg, 1909)
- Apoecus colonus (Möllendorff, 1895)
- Apoecus corti (Bavay & Dautzenberg, 1909)
- Apoecus glandula (Mousson, 1848)
- Apoecus granifer (Möllendorff, 1901)
- Apoecus granulatus (Möllendorff, 1884)
- Apoecus huberi (Thach, 2018)
- Apoecus leptostracus (Schmacker & O. Boettger, 1891)
- Apoecus macrostoma (Bavay & Dautzenberg, 1912)
- Apoecus messageri (Bavay & Dautzenberg, 1900)
- Apoecus montivagus (van Benthem Jutting, 1959)
- Apoecus phaedusoides (Thiele, 1931)
- Apoecus prillwitzi (Möllendorff, 1897)
- Apoecus ramelauensis Köhler, Criscione, Burghardt & Kessner, 2016
- Apoecus scaber (Bavay & Dautzenberg, 1912)
- Apoecus semmelinki (Maassen, 2002)
- Apoecus tenggericus (Möllendorff, 1897)
- Apoecus tenuiliratus (Möllendorff, 1897)
- Apoecus tenuistriata (Dautzenberg & H. Fischer, 1908)
- Apoecus thraustus (Möllendorff, 1897)
- Apoecus tonkinianus (Bavay & Dautzenberg, 1912)
- Apoecus trivialis (Ancey, 1888)
- Apoecus varians (Bavay & Dautzenberg, 1912)
- Apoecus warburgi (Schmacker & O. Boettger, 1891)
- Apoecus wilhelminae (Maassen, 1998)

Species brought into synonymy

- Apoecus clausiliaeformis (Bavay & Dautzenberg, 1912): synonym of Apoecus phaedusoides (Thiele, 1931) (replacement name)
