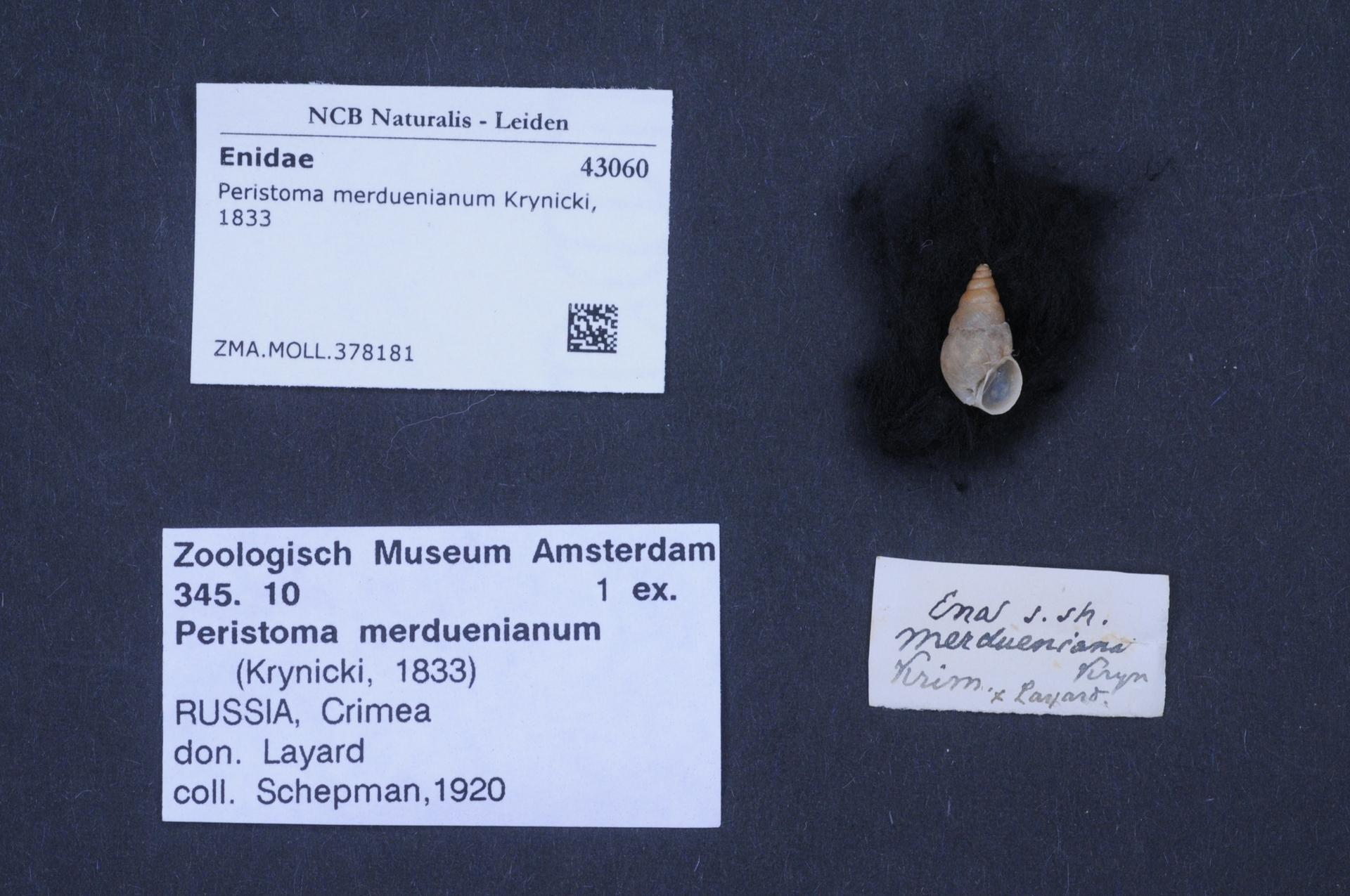
- Peristoma merduenianum

Scientific classification
- Domain: Eukaryota
- Kingdom: Animalia
- Phylum: Mollusca
- Class: Gastropoda
- Order: Stylommatophora
- Family: Enidae
- Genus: Peristoma; Krynicki, 1833

= Peristoma =

Genus of molluscs

Peristoma is a genus of gastropods belonging to the family Enidae.

The species of this genus are found in Black Sea.

Species:

- Peristoma boettgeri (Clessin, 1883)
- Peristoma lanceum Schileyko, 1984
- Peristoma merduenianum Krynicki, 1833
- Peristoma rupestre (Krynicki, 1833)
