= Paramastus =

Scientific classification
- Kingdom: Animalia
- Phylum: Mollusca
- Class: Gastropoda
- Order: Stylommatophora
- Family: Enidae
- Genus: Paramastus; Hesse, 1933

Genus of molluscs

Paramastus is a genus of gastropods belonging to the family Enidae.

The species of this genus are found in East Mediterranean and Black Sea.

Species:

- Paramastus cyprius Zilch, 1951
- Paramastus dernensis Zilch, 1951
- Paramastus edentatus (Sturany, 1908)
- Paramastus episomus (Bourguignat, 1857)
- Paramastus forcarti Zilch, 1951
- Paramastus gaillyi (Westerlund, 1887)
- Paramastus hedjazicus (Bourguignat, 1882)
- Paramastus kaltenbachi Zilch, 1951
- Paramastus sabaeanus (Bourguignat, 1876)
