= Luchuena =

Scientific classification
- Kingdom: Animalia
- Phylum: Mollusca
- Class: Gastropoda
- Order: Stylommatophora
- Superfamily: Pupilloidea
- Family: Enidae
- Genus: Luchuena; Habe, 1956

Genus of gastropods

Luchuena is a genus of air-breathing land snails, terrestrial pulmonate gastropod mollusks in the family Enidae.

== Species ==
Species within the genus Luchuena include:

- Luchuena hachijoensis
