= Napaeopsis =

Scientific classification
- Kingdom: Animalia
- Phylum: Mollusca
- Class: Gastropoda
- Order: Stylommatophora
- Family: Enidae
- Genus: Napaeopsis; Sturany & A. J. Wagner, 1914

Genus of molluscs

Napaeopsis is a genus of gastropods belonging to the family Enidae.

The species of this genus are found in the Balkans.

Species:

- Napaeopsis cefalonica (Mousson, 1859)
- Napaeopsis mennoi Gittenberger, 2008
- Napaeopsis merditana (Sturany, 1907)
- Napaeopsis minima Bank & Menkhorst, 1992
- Napaeopsis ossica (Boettger, 1885)
