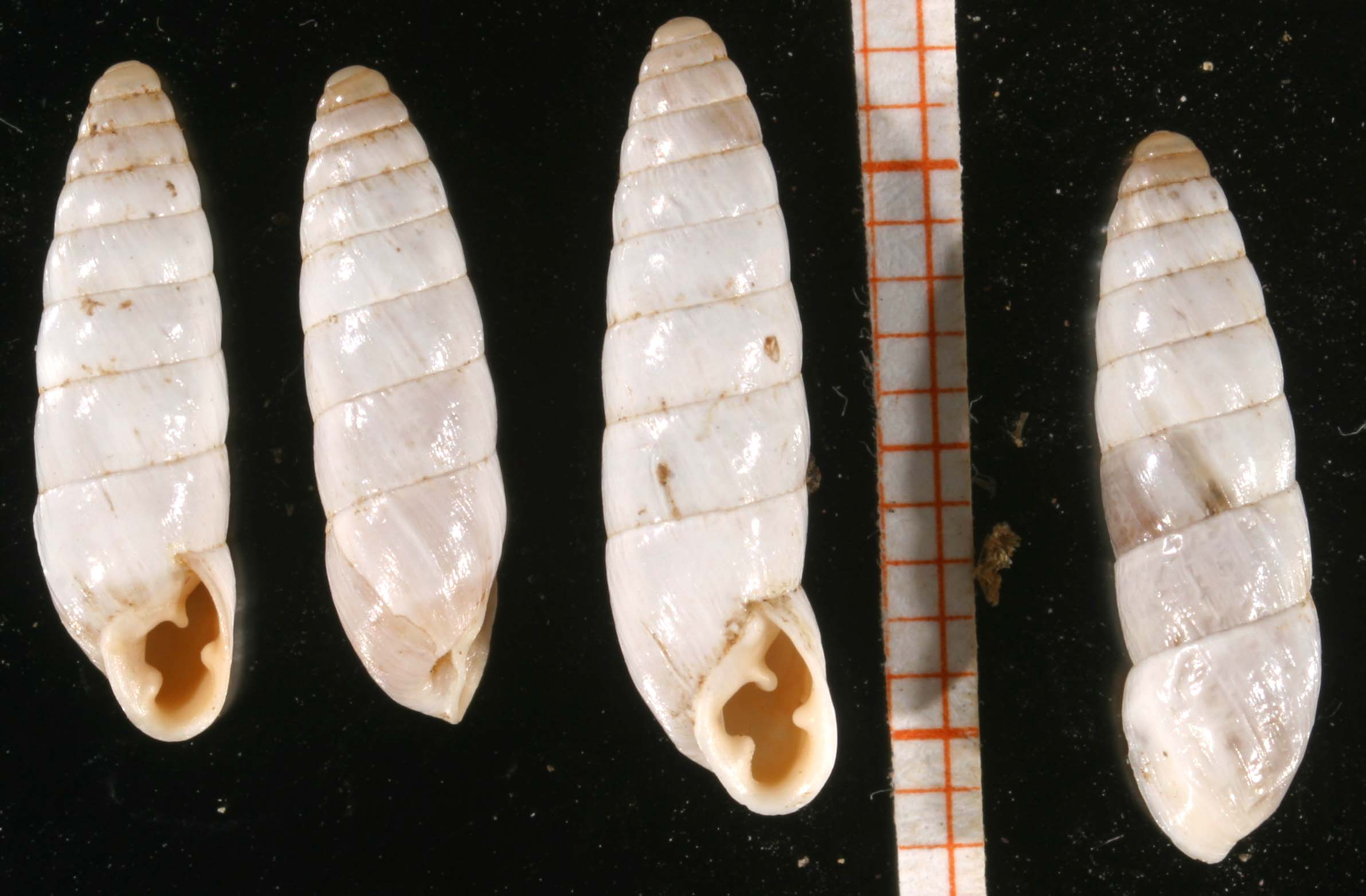
- Chondrus zebrula shell

Scientific classification
- Domain: Eukaryota
- Kingdom: Animalia
- Phylum: Mollusca
- Class: Gastropoda
- Order: Stylommatophora
- Family: Enidae
- Genus: Chondrus; Cuvier, 1816

= Chondrus (gastropod) =

Genus of molluscs

Chondrus is a genus of gastropods belonging to the family Enidae.

The species of this genus are found in Mediterranean.

Species:

- Chondrus lycaonicus (Sturany, 1904)
- Chondrus pusanovi Steklov, 1966
- Chondrus tournefortianus (Férussac, 1821)
- Chondrus zebrulus (Férussac, 1821)
- Chondrus zebrulus (Férussac, 1821)
