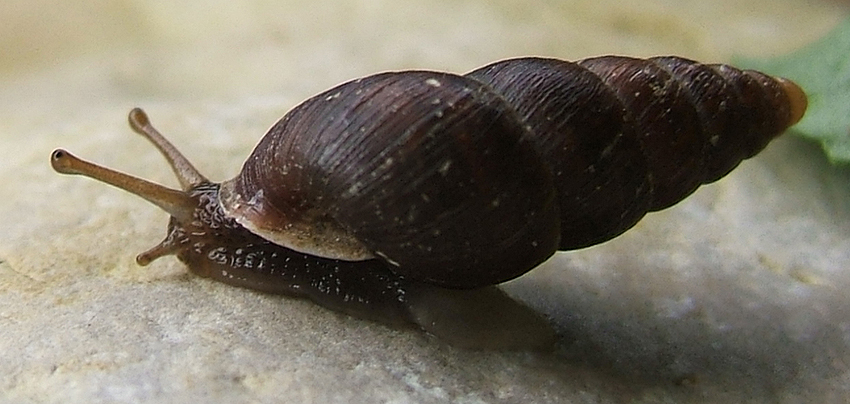
- Ena montana

Scientific classification
- Kingdom: Animalia
- Phylum: Mollusca
- Class: Gastropoda
- Order: Stylommatophora
- Infraorder: Pupilloidei
- Superfamily: Pupilloidea
- Family: Enidae
- Genus: Ena; Turton, 1831

Synonyms
- Buliminus (Ena) W. Turton, 1831; Bulinus S. Studer, 1820; Ena (Ena) W. Turton, 1831· accepted, alternate representation; Glischrus (Bulinus) S. Studer, 1820 (homonym; non O. F. Müller, 1781)

= Ena (gastropod) =

Genus of gastropods

Ena is a genus of air-breathing land snails, terrestrial pulmonate gastropod mollusks in the family Enidae.

== Species ==
Species within the genus Ena include:

- † Ena auversiensis (Deshayes, 1863)
- Ena concolor (Westerlund, 1887)
- Ena coreanica Pilsbry & Y. Hirase, 1908
- Ena dazimonensis Hausdorf & Bank, 2001
- Ena elongata (Kobelt, 1877)
- † Ena hassiaca (Wenz, 1919)
- Ena leptostraca (Schmacker & Böttger, 1891)
- Ena menkhorsti Hausdorf & Bank, 2001
- Ena montana (Draparnaud, 1801)
- Ena monticola (J. R. Roth, 1856)
- Ena nogellii (Roth, 1850) - synonym: Buliminus ponticus Retowski, 1886
- † Ena stefanii Wenz, 1919
- Ena subtilis (Rossmässler, 1837)

Taxa inquirenda

- Ena batarae B. Rensch, 1930
- Ena gaillardi Fischer-Piette & Bedoucha, 1964
- † Ena sharmani (Baily, 1858)
