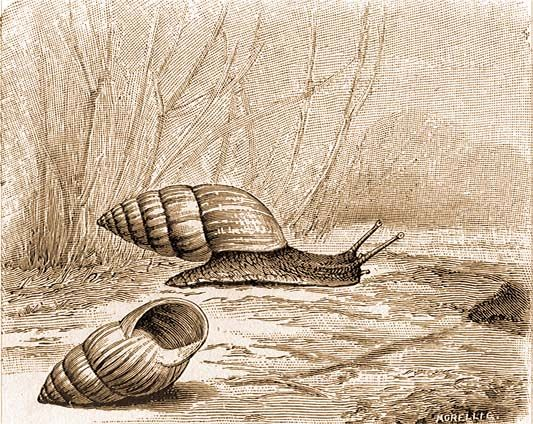
- An illustration showing both a live snail and a shell of Zebrina detrita

Scientific classification
- Domain: Eukaryota
- Kingdom: Animalia
- Phylum: Mollusca
- Class: Gastropoda
- Order: Stylommatophora
- Family: Enidae
- Subfamily: Eninae
- Tribe: Chondrulini
- Genus: Zebrina; Held, 1837

Synonyms
- Buliminus (Zebrina) Held, 1838; Buliminus (Zebrinus) Westerlund, 1887 (unjustified emendation); Zebrina (Zebrina) Held, 1838 · alternate representation; Zebrinus Westerlund, 1887

= Zebrina =

Genus of gastropods

Zebrina is a genus of air-breathing land snails, terrestrial pulmonate gastropod mollusks in the family Enidae.

== Description ==
The solid shell is rimately perforated, oblong-conic or fusiformly cylindrical. The apex is horny and rather obtuse. The body whorl is shorter than the spire. The small aperture is obliquely oval. The peristome is straight, labiate within and dentate. The right margin is rather expanded. The columellar margin is reflexed and patulous.

== Species ==
Species in the genus Zebrina include:

- † Zebrina beringi Schütt, 1985
- † Zebrina cylindroides Wenz, 1930
- Zebrina dardana (R.A. Philippi, 1844)
- Zebrina detrita (O. F. Müller, 1774)
- Zebrina fasciolata (Olivier, 1801) – type species for genus Zebrina
- † Zebrina gumsiana Steklov, 1966
- Zebrina spratti (L. Pfeiffer, 1846)

Species brought into synonymy

- Zebrina caesia (O. Boettger, 1885): synonym of Rhabdoena cosensis (Reeve, 1849) (junior subjective synonym)
- Zebrina carducha (E. von Martens, 1874): synonym of Iranopsis carduchus (E. von Martens, 1874) (superseded combination)
- Zebrina eburnea (L. Pfeiffer, 1842): synonym of Leucomastus eburneus (L. Pfeiffer, 1842) (superseded combination)
- Zebrina kindermanni (L. Pfeiffer, 1853) : synonym of Leucomastus kindermanni (L. Pfeiffer, 1854)
- Zebrina libbahensis (Tomlin, 1910): synonym of Zebrinops libbahensis (Tomlin, 1910)
- Zebrina schalfejewi (Gredler, 1898): synonym of Clausiliopsis schalfejewi (Gredler, 1898)
- Zebrina varnensis (L. Pfeiffer, 1847): synonym of Leucomastus varnensis (L. Pfeiffer, 1847) (superseded generic combination)
