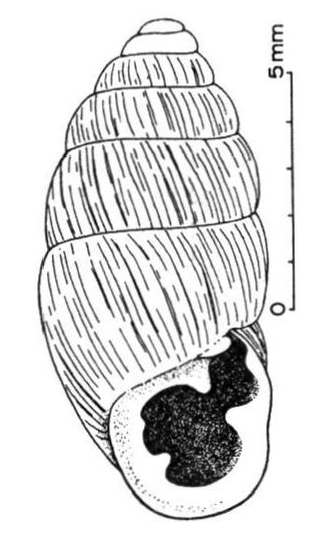
- Drawing of apertural view of a shell of Chondrula tridens

Scientific classification
- Kingdom: Animalia
- Phylum: Mollusca
- Class: Gastropoda
- Order: Stylommatophora
- Family: Enidae
- Genus: Chondrula; Beck, 1837

Type species
- Helix tridens O.F. Müller, 1774

Synonyms
- Buliminus (Chondrula) Beck, 1837; Buliminus (Chondrulus) Westerlund, 1887; Chondrulus Westerlund, 1887; Dentistomus M. Kimakowicz, 1890; Eucore Charpentier, 1837; Gonodon Held, 1838; Odontalus Parreyss, 1849; Pupa (Chondrula) Beck, 1837 (original combination); Tridensiana Caziot, 1910

= Chondrula =

Genus of gastropods

Chondrula is a genus of air-breathing land snails, terrestrial pulmonate gastropod mollusks in the family Enidae.

Chondrula is the type genus of the tribe Chondrulini.

== Distribution ==
Distribution of the genus Chondrula ranges from Europe and northern Africa and to Iran.

== Species ==
Species within the genus Chondrula include:

- Chondrula albolimbata (Pfeiffer, 1859)
- Chondrula beieri Klemm, 1962 - from Greece
- Chondrula bergeri (Roth, 1839)
- Chondrula bicallosa (Pfeiffer, 1847)
- Chondrula consentanea (Westerlund, 1887) - from the Balkans
- Chondrula diodon (Retowski, 1883)
- Chondrula jaczewskii (Wagner, 1928)
- Chondrula lugorensis Wagner, 1914 - from the Balkans
- Chondrula lycaonica (Sturany, 1904) - from Turkey
- Chondrula macedonica Wagner, 1914
- Chondrula microtragus (Rossmässler, 1839)
- Chondrula mletaki Lajtner, 1993
- Chondrula munita (Westerlund, 1894) - synonym: Chondrula minuta, from Greece
- Chondrula orientalis (Pfeiffer, 1848) - from Turkey
- Chondrula pindica (Westerlund, 1894) - from Greece
- Chondrula pupa (Linnaeus, 1758)
- Chondrula quinquedentata (Rossmässler, 1837)
- Chondrula sturmii (Küster, 1852) - from Turkey
- Chondrula tricuspidata (Küster, 1843)
- Chondrula tridens (O. F. Müller, 1774) - type species
- Chondrula vaderi Gittenberger, 1967
- Chondrula werneri (Sturany, 1902) - from Turkey

synonyms

- Chondrula nachicevanjensis Hudec, 1972: synonym of Multidentula nachicevanjensis (Hudec, 1972)
- Chondrula peloponnesica Gittenberger, 1984 is a synonym of Mastus peloponnesicus (Gittenberger, 1984)
- Chondrula pupa (Linnaeus, 1758) is a synonym of Mastus pupa (Linnaeus, 1758)
