= Mastoides =

Scientific classification
- Kingdom: Animalia
- Phylum: Mollusca
- Class: Gastropoda
- Order: Stylommatophora
- Family: Enidae
- Tribe: Enini
- Genus: Mastoides; Westerlund, 1896

Genus of land snails

Mastoides is a genus of air-breathing land snails, terrestrial pulmonate gastropod mollusks in the family Enidae.

== Species ==
Species within the genus Mastoides include:

- Mastoides albocostatus (Westerlund, 1896)
- Mastoides obeliscus Schileyko, 2007
- Mastoides orloffensis (Kobelt, 1905)
