= Megalena =

Scientific classification
- Kingdom: Animalia
- Phylum: Mollusca
- Class: Gastropoda
- Order: Stylommatophora
- Family: Enidae
- Subfamily: Eninae
- Tribe: Enini
- Genus: Megalena; Hausdorf, 1999
- Species: M. crassa

Binomial name
- Megalena crassa (Retowski, 1887)

Synonyms
- Buliminus (Zebrina?) crassus Retowski, 1887; Paramastus ? goettingi Forcart, 1961

Species of gastropod

Megalena crassa, is a species of air-breathing land snail, a terrestrial pulmonate gastropod mollusk in the family Enidae.

Megalena is a monotypic genus, i.e. it contains only one species, Megalena crassa and therefore this species is also the type species.

The generic name is composed from the prefix mega-, which means "large" from the ancient Greek language, and from the suffix -ena, for which the etymological origin is unknown.

Specimens of this species are stored in collections in Europe: Germany (Senckenberg Museum, Institute of Zoology and Museum of Zoology of University of Hamburg), Poland (Institute of Zoology of Polish Academy of Sciences in Warszawa) and in the Netherlands.

== Distribution ==
This species is known only from a few individuals which were found in northwestern Turkey.

== Description ==
The shell is oval and elongated. The height of the shell is from 23.9 mm to 28.7 mm.
