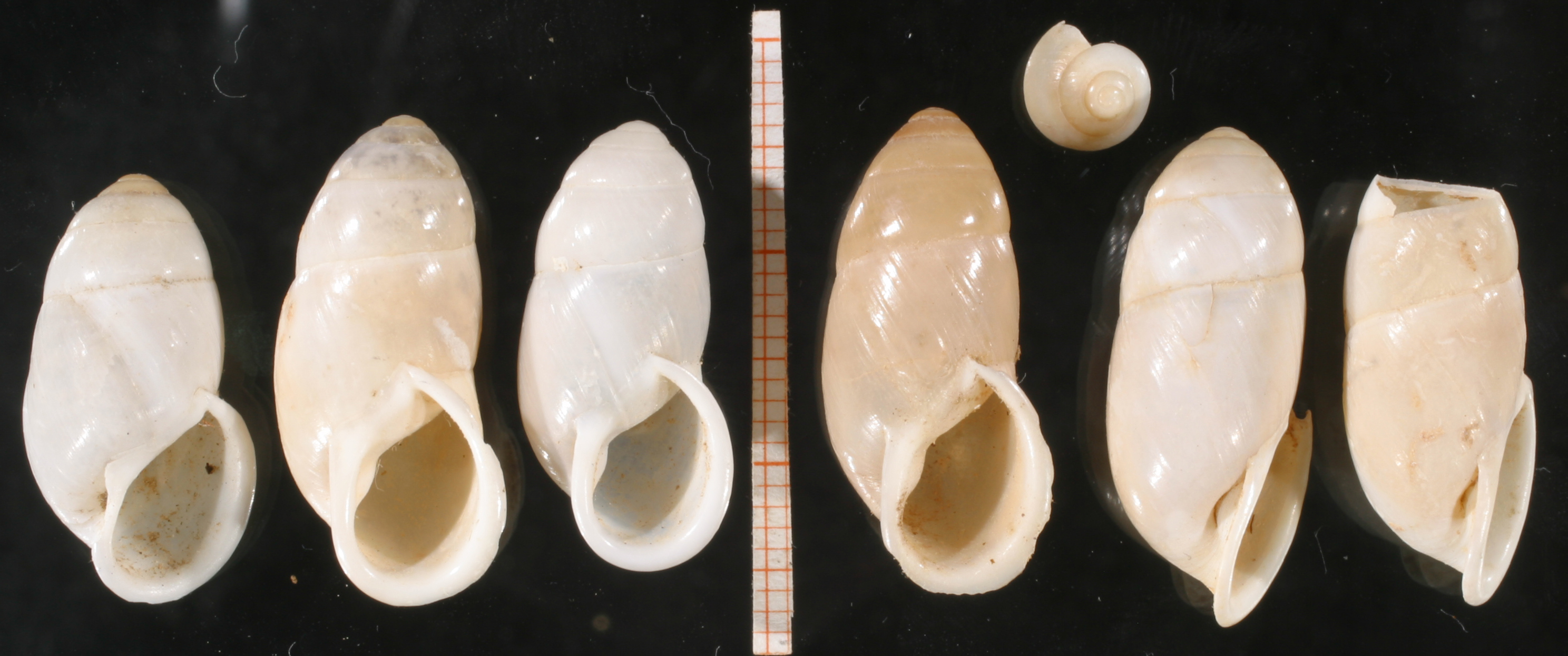
- A group of shells of Buliminus labrosus

Scientific classification
- Kingdom: Animalia
- Phylum: Mollusca
- Class: Gastropoda
- Order: Stylommatophora
- Family: Enidae
- Genus: Buliminus; Beck, 1837

= Buliminus =

Genus of gastropods

Buliminus, is a genus of air-breathing land snails, terrestrial pulmonate gastropod mollusks in the family Enidae.

== Species ==
Species within the genus Buliminus include:

- Buliminus labrosus
