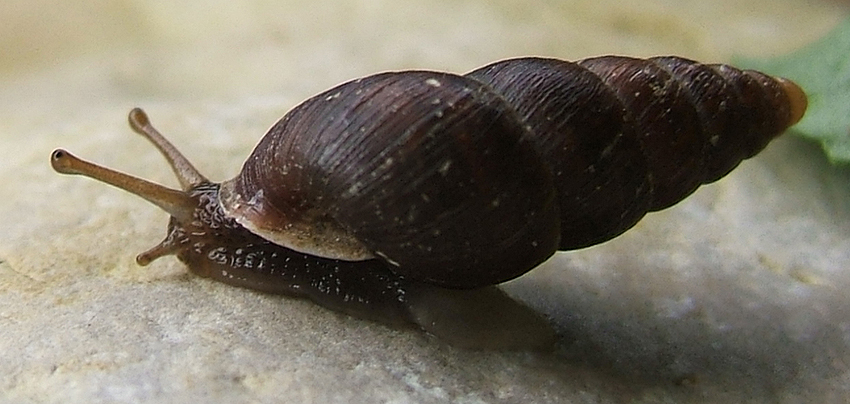

Conservation status
- Least Concern (IUCN 3.1)

Scientific classification
- Kingdom: Animalia
- Phylum: Mollusca
- Class: Gastropoda
- Order: Stylommatophora
- Family: Enidae
- Genus: Ena
- Species: E. montana

Binomial name
- Ena montana (Draparnaud, 1801)

Synonyms
- Bulimus montanus Draparnaud, 1801; Ena (Ena) montana (Draparnaud, 1801)

= Ena montana =

Species of gastropod

Ena montana is a species of air-breathing land snails, terrestrial pulmonate gastropod molluscs in the family Enidae.

== Distribution ==
This species occurs in European countries and islands including:

- Czech Republic
- Great Britain, rare in south England
- Poland
- Slovakia
- Bulgaria
- Russia
- Ukraine

== Description ==
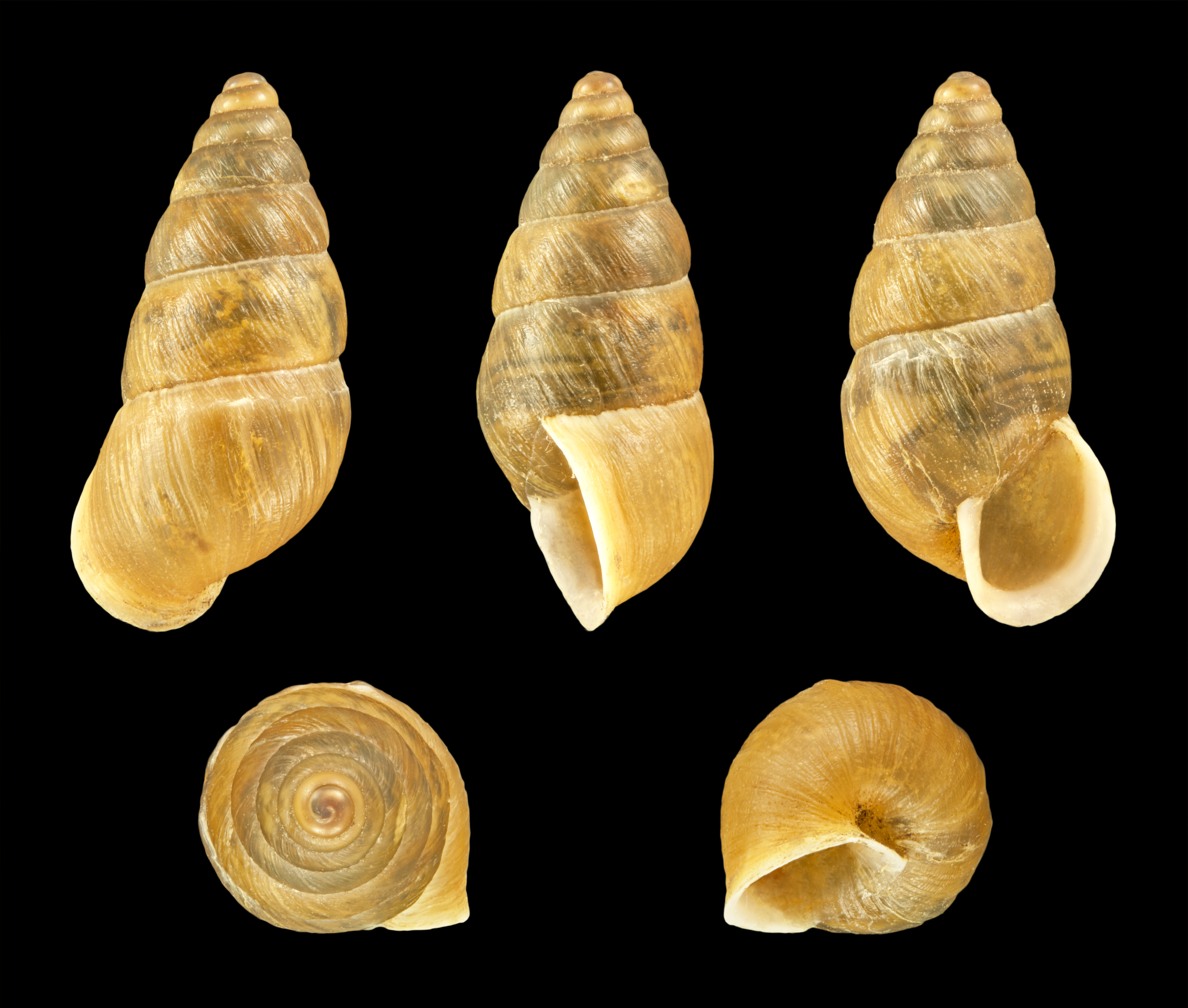
Shell

The weight of the adult live snail is about 208.5±17.3 mg.
