= Vasiliy Lindholm =

Russian malacologist and herpetologist

Vasiliy Adolfovich Lindholm Bасилий Aдольфович Линдгольм
- Born: 1874
- Died: 17 September 1935 (aged 60–61)
- Known for: Work on the molluscs of various parts of the USSR
- Scientific career
- Fields: Malacology, herpetology
- Workplaces: Zoological Museum of the Zoological Institute of the Russian Academy of Sciences

Vasiliy Adolfovich Lindholm (Russian: Bасилий Aдольфович Линдгольм; 1874 – 17 September 1935), also published as Wilhelm Adolf Lindholm, was a Russian malacologist and herpetologist.

Lindholm was a curator at the Zoological Museum of the Zoological Institute of the Russian Academy of Sciences in Leningrad. He published works on the molluscs of Lake Baikal, the Crimea, the Caucasus and other parts of the U.S.S.R., and on Palaearctic molluscs generally. He also studied amphibians and reptiles, and described three new species of reptiles. A frog Afrixalus lindholmi is named for him, sometimes known as Lindholm's banana frog.
