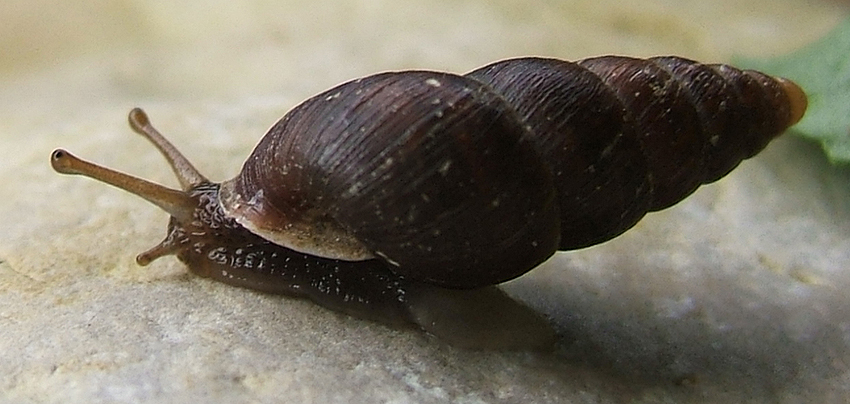
- A live individual of Ena montana

Scientific classification
- Kingdom: Animalia
- Phylum: Mollusca
- Class: Gastropoda
- Order: Stylommatophora
- Superfamily: Pupilloidea
- Family: Enidae; B. B. Woodward, 1903 (1880)

Genera
- See text

= Enidae =

Family of gastropods

Enidae is a family of air-breathing land snails, terrestrial pulmonate gastropod mollusks.

== Anatomy ==
In this family, the number of haploid chromosomes lies between 21 and 25 (according to the values in this table).

== Taxonomy ==
=== 1998 taxonomy ===
The following subfamilies of Enidae are based on work by Schileyko (1998) and they are in use mainly by Russian malacologists:

- subfamily Pseudonapaeinae
- subfamily Chondrulopsininae
- subfamily Merdigerinae
- subfamily Buliminusinae
- subfamily Andronakiinae
- subfamily Retowskiinae
- subfamily Eninae - including Chondrula
- subfamily Multidentulini

=== 2005 taxonomy ===
The following two subfamilies have been recognized in the taxonomy of Bouchet & Rocroi (2005):

- subfamily Eninae B. B. Woodward, 1903 (1880)
  - tribus Enini B. B. Woodward, 1903 (1880) - synonyms: Napaeinae A. J. Wagner, 1928; Jaminiinae Thiele, 1931; Pseudonapaeinae Schileyko, 1978; Retowskiinae Schileyko, 1978; Andronakiinae Schileyko, 1998
  - tribus Chondrulini Wenz, 1923
  - tribus Multidentulini Schileyko, 1978 - synonyms: Chondrulopsininae Schileyko, 1978; Merdigerinae Schileyko, 1984; Euchondrinae Schileyko, 1998
- subfamily Buliminusinae Kobelt, 1880 - synonym Buliminidae Pfeiffer, 1879

== Genera ==
Genera within the family Enidae include:

subfamilia Eninae

- Boninena Habe, 1956

either in Enini or in Chondrulini

- Brephulopsis Lindholm, 1925
- Caucasicola Hesse, 1917
- Chondrus Cuvier, 1817
- Georginapaeus Schileyko, 1988
- Peristoma Krynicki, 1833
- Ramusculus Lindholm, 1925
- Thoanteus Lindholm, 1925
- tribus Enini
  - Akramowskiella Schileyko, 1984
  - Andronakia Lindholm, 1914
  - Apoecus Möllendorff, 1902
  - Ayna Páll-Gergely, 2009
  - Clausilioides Lindholm, 1925
  - Differena Schileyko, 1984
  - Ena Turton, 1831 - type genus of the family Enidae
  - Geminula Lindholm, 1925
  - Imparietula Lindholm, 1925
  - Jaminia Risso, 1826
  - Laevozebrinus Lindholm, 1925
  - Ljudmilena Schileyko, 1984
  - Mastoides Westerlund, 1896
  - Megalena Hausdorf, 1999 There is only one species Megalena crassa (Retowski, 1887) in the genus Megalena.
  - Mirus Albers, 1850
  - Napaeus Albers, 1850
  - Napaeopsis Sturany & Wagner, 1914
  - Ottorosenia Muratov, 1992
  - Petraeomastus Möllendorff, 1901
  - Pseudochondrula Hesse, 1933
  - Pseudonapaeus Westerlund, 1887
  - Retowskia O. Boettger, 1881
  - Subzebrinus Westerlund, 1887
  - Turanena Lindholm, 1922
- tribus Chondrulini
  - Chondrula Beck, 1837 - type genus of the tribe Chondrulini
  - Leucomastus Wagner, 1928
  - Mastus Beck, 1837
  - Meijeriella Bank, 1985
  - Rhabdoena Kobelt & Möllendorff, 1902
  - Zebrina Held, 1837
- tribus Multidentulini
  - Chondrulopsina Lindholm, 1925
  - Euchondrus Boettger, 1883
  - Improvisa Schileyko, 1978
  - Multidentula Lindholm, 1925
  - Merdigera Held, 1837
  - Pentadentula Suvorov, 2006
  - Senaridenta Schileyko, 1978
  - Siraphoroides Schileyko, 1977

subfamily Buliminusinae

- Buliminus Beck, 1837 - type genus of the subfamily Buliminusinae
- Cyrenaeus Heller, 1971
- Mordania Bank & Neubert, 1998
- Paramastus Hesse, 1933
- Pene Pallary, 1929

subfamily ?

- † Balearena Altaba, 2007 - type species † Balearena gymnesica Altaba, 2007
- Luchuena Habe, 1956
