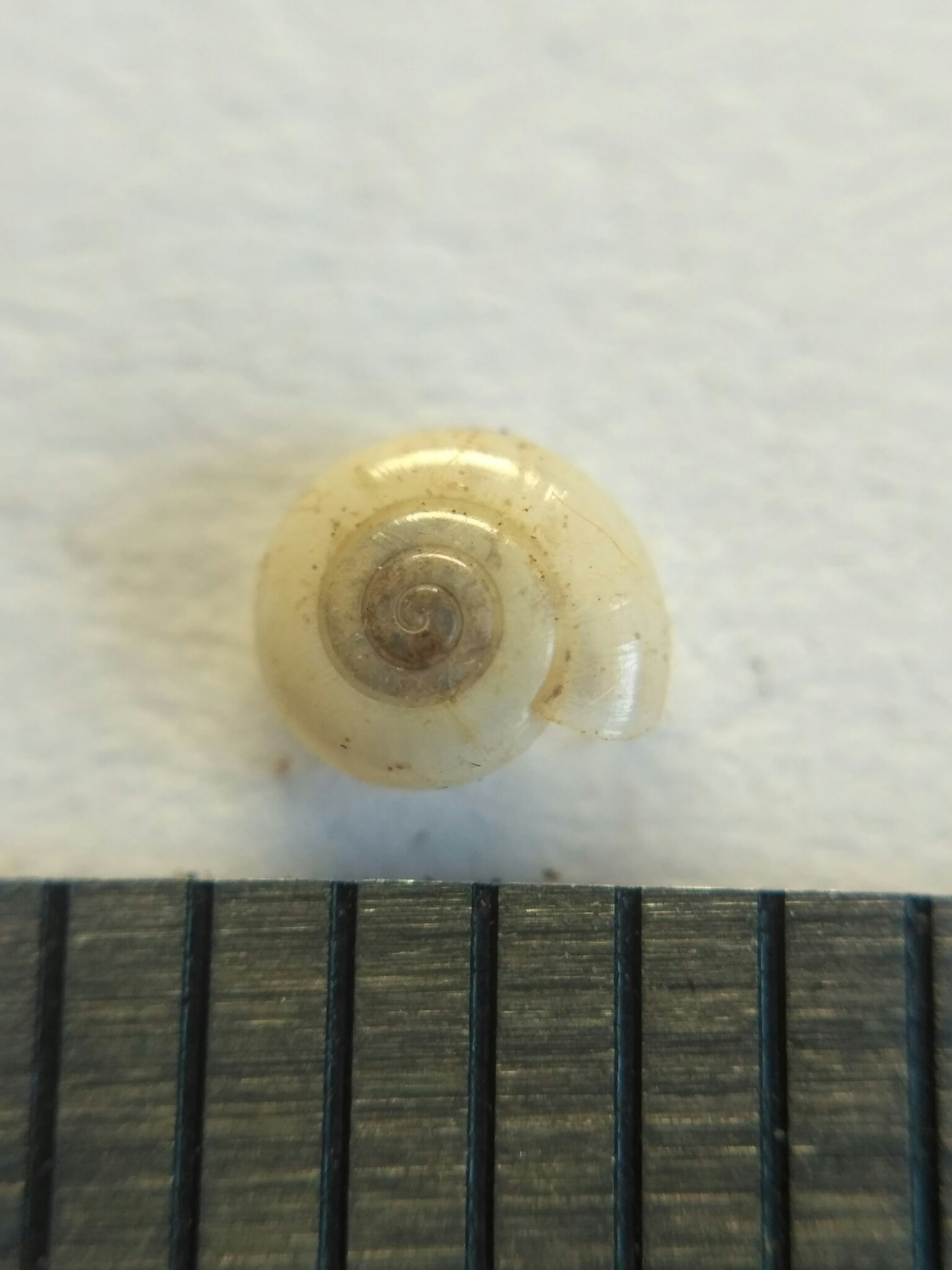
- Shell of T. babugana

Scientific classification
- Domain: Eukaryota
- Kingdom: Animalia
- Phylum: Mollusca
- Class: Gastropoda
- Order: Stylommatophora
- Family: Pristilomatidae
- Genus: Taurinellushka; Balashov, 2014

= Taurinellushka =

Genus of gastropods

Taurinellushka is a genus of air-breathing land snails, terrestrial pulmonate gastropod mollusks in the family Pristilomatidae.

== Species ==
The genus Taurinellushka includes one species:

- Taurinellushka babugana Balashov, 2014
