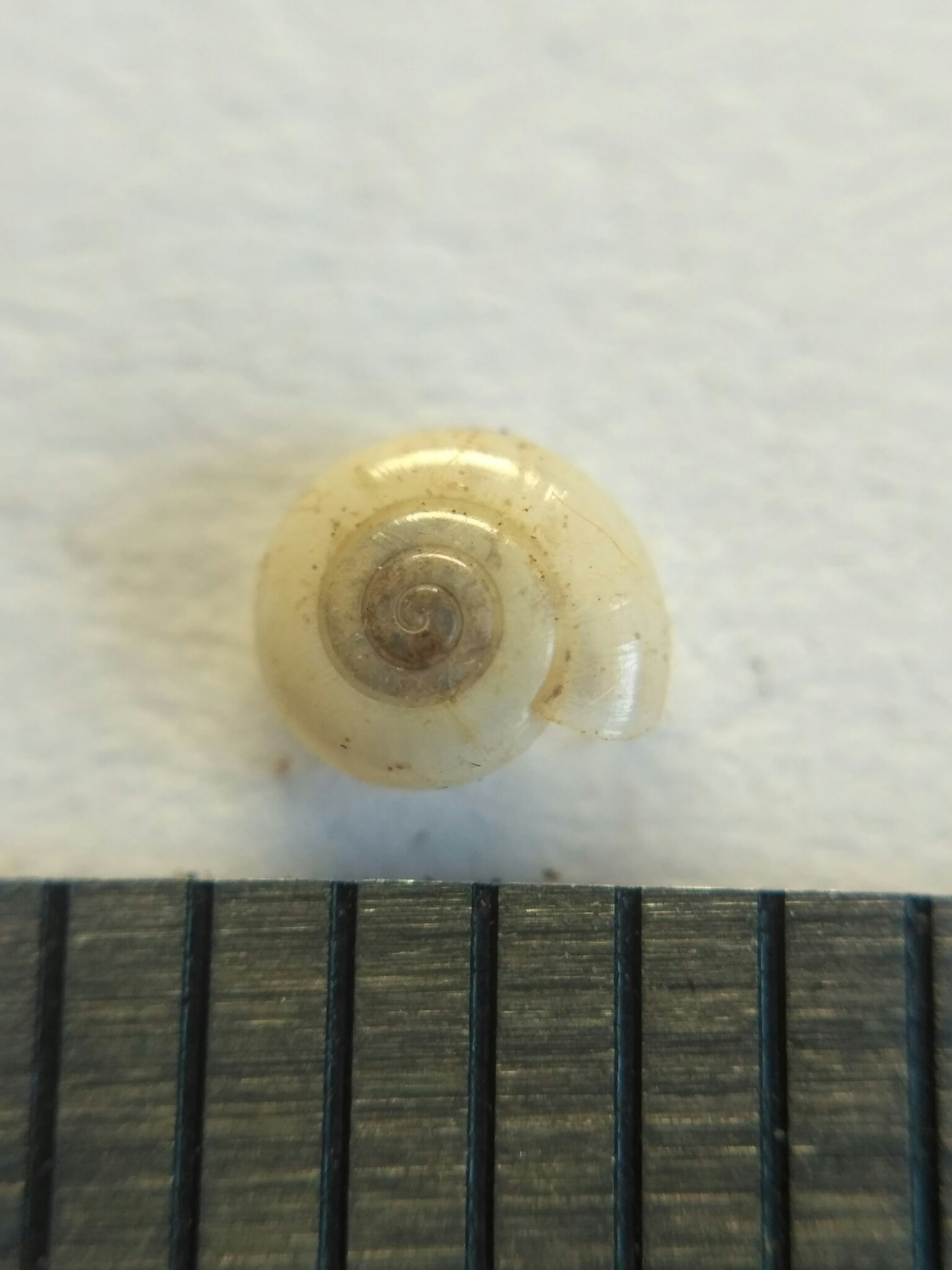
- Shell of T. babugana

Scientific classification
- Domain: Eukaryota
- Kingdom: Animalia
- Phylum: Mollusca
- Class: Gastropoda
- Order: Stylommatophora
- Family: Pristilomatidae
- Genus: Taurinellushka
- Species: T. babugana

Binomial name
- Taurinellushka babugana Balashov, 2014

= Taurinellushka babugana =

Species of gastropod

Taurinellushka babugana is a species of small, air-breathing land snail, a terrestrial pulmonate gastropod mollusk in the family Pristilomatidae.

== Distribution ==
This species is endemic to the central part of the Crimean Mountains.
