= Euxinella =

Euxinella may refer to:

- Euxinella (gastropod), a genus of gastropods in the family Clausiliidae
- Euxinella, a genus of protists in the family Loeblichiidae, synonym of Euxinita
- Euxinella, a genus of arachnids in the family arachnids, synonym of Nurscia
