= I. triloba =

I. triloba may refer to:

- Ipomoea triloba, the littlebell or Aiea morning glory, a flowering plant species native to the tropical Americas
- Isias triloba, a synonym for Serapias neglecta, an orchid species endemic to southern Europe

== See also ==
- Triloba – Genus of gastropods
