= Columbinia elegans =

Scientific classification
- Kingdom: Animalia
- Phylum: Mollusca
- Class: Gastropoda
- Order: Stylommatophora
- Family: Clausiliidae
- Genus: Columbinia
- Species: C. elegans

Binomial name
- Columbinia elegans H. Nordsieck, 2010

Species of gastropod

Columbinia elegans is a left-handed, air-breathing land snail species in the genus Columbinia. It is found in Peru.
