= Bofilliella =

Conservation status
- Near Threatened (IUCN 3.1)

Scientific classification
- Kingdom: Animalia
- Phylum: Mollusca
- Class: Gastropoda
- Order: Stylommatophora
- Family: Clausiliidae
- Genus: Bofilliella; Ehrmann, 1927
- Species: B. subarcuata

Binomial name
- Bofilliella subarcuata (Bofill, 1897)

Synonyms
- Laminifera (Bofilliella) Ehrmann, 1927; Nenia subarcuata Bofill, 1897

Genus of gastropods

Bofilliella is a monotypic genus of small terrestrial snails in the family Clausiliidae. The sole species is Bofilliella subarcuata. The genus is named in honour of Spanish (Catalan) geologist and malacologist Artur Bofill who described the type species.

== Distribution and habitat ==
Bofilliella subarcuata is only found in the Eastern Pyrenees; the range is mostly in Spain but one locality is in France, near the border. It lives in leaf litter in woodlands and in cave entrances in humid places at elevations of 150–950 m (490–3,120 ft) above sea level.
