= Andinia =

Andinia may refer to:

- Andinia (plant), an orchid genus in the family Orchidaceae
- Andinia (gastropod), a land snail genus in the family Clausiliidae
- Andinia Plan, an alleged plan to establish a Jewish state in parts of Argentina
