= Serrulina serrulata =

Scientific classification
- Domain: Eukaryota
- Kingdom: Animalia
- Phylum: Mollusca
- Class: Gastropoda
- Order: Stylommatophora
- Family: Clausiliidae
- Genus: Serrulina
- Species: S. serrulata

Binomial name
- Serrulina serrulata Pfeiffer, L., 1847

Species of gastropod

Serrulina serrulata is a species of air-breathing land snail, a terrestrial pulmonate gastropod mollusk in the family Clausiliidae, the door snails, all of which have a clausilium.

== Subspecies ==
Subspecies within this species include:

- Serrulina serrulata serrulata (L. Pfeiffer 1847)
- Serrulina serrulata amanica (Naegele 1906)

== Distribution ==
=== Serrulina serrulata amanica (Naegele 1906) ===
- Southern Turkey Amanus Mountains (Hatay Province)

=== Serrulina serrulata serrulata (L. Pfeiffer 1847) ===
- Western, Northern, Central and Southern Caucasus to Azerbaijan
- Northern Turkey
- Bulgaria
- Romania - 4 localities
- Moldova - 1 locality in Codri
- Western Ukraine - 3 localities in Carpathians, where protected since 1994 by Red Book of Ukraine
