= Truncatophaedusa =

Scientific classification
- Kingdom: Animalia
- Phylum: Mollusca
- Class: Gastropoda
- Order: Stylommatophora
- Family: Clausiliidae
- Genus: Truncatophaedusa; Majoros, Németh, L. & Szili-Kovács, 1994
- Species: T. evae

Binomial name
- Truncatophaedusa evae Majoros, Németh, L. & Szili-Kovács, 1994

Genus of gastropods

Truncatophaedusa is a monotypic land snail genus belonging to the family Clausiliidae, the door snails, all of which have a clausilium. The sole species belonging to the genus is Truncatophaedusa evae.

== Ecology ==
The species inhabits a small area in the Western Caucasus in the vicinity of Sochi. It is known from two localities:

- The valley of the river Dagomys near the village Nor Luis. The site is 10 km to the north of the village Dagomys, to the north of Sochi (locus typicus). The habitat is a mossy riverbank under a thick boxwood (Buxus) forest.
- The valley of the river Hosta, southeast of Sochi. The riverbank where the dirt road enters the village Rossvet from the south.

Nordsieck (2007) considers the genus Truncatophaedusa to be a subgenus of the genus Serrulina.
