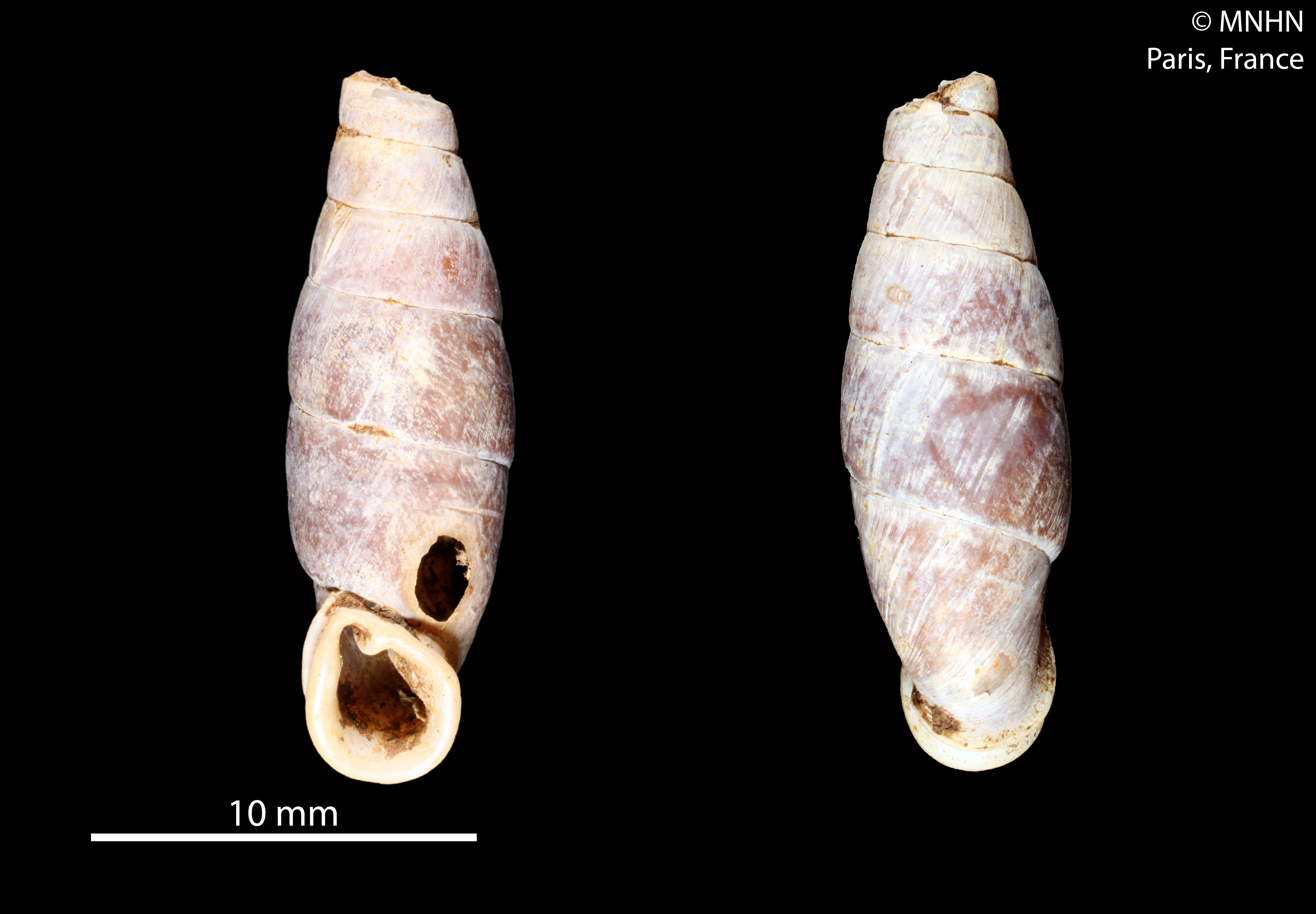
- Shell of Selenophaedusa diplochilus griffithsi (paratype at MNHN, Paris)

Scientific classification
- Kingdom: Animalia
- Phylum: Mollusca
- Class: Gastropoda
- Order: Stylommatophora
- Infraorder: Clausilioidei
- Superfamily: Clausilioidea
- Family: Clausiliidae
- Genus: Selenophaedusa; Lindholm, 1924

Synonyms
- Hemiphaedusa (Selenophaedusa) Lindholm, 1924 (unaccepted rank); Synprosphyma (Selenophaedusa) Lindholm, 1924 (original rank)

= Selenophaedusa =

Genus of gastropods

Selenophaedusa is a genus of terrestrial gastropods belonging to the family Clausiliidae.

== Species ==
- Selenophaedusa bavayi (H. Nordsieck, 2002)
- Selenophaedusa billeti (H. Fischer, 1898)
- Selenophaedusa callistoma (Bavay & Dautzenberg, 1899)
- Selenophaedusa callistomella (Bavay & Dautzenberg, 1900)
- Selenophaedusa castanea (H. Nordsieck, 2012)
- Selenophaedusa cazioti (Bavay & Dautzenberg, 1909)
- Selenophaedusa chiemhoaensis (Sykes, 1902)
- Selenophaedusa dentifera Hunyadi & Szekeres, 2016
- Selenophaedusa diplochilus (Möllendorff, 1901)
- Selenophaedusa falcifera (Bavay & Dautzenberg, 1899)
- Selenophaedusa jimenezi Grego & Szekeres, 2017
- Selenophaedusa lantenoisi (Dautzenberg & H. Fischer, 1906)
- Selenophaedusa lavillei (Dautzenberg & H. Fischer, 1906)
- Selenophaedusa media (H. Nordsieck, 2005)
- Selenophaedusa ophthalmophana (Mabille, 1887)
- Selenophaedusa polydonella (H. Nordsieck, 2005)
- Selenophaedusa porphyrostoma (Bavay & Dautzenberg, 1909)
- Selenophaedusa princeps (H. Nordsieck, 2012)
- Selenophaedusa spinifera (H. Nordsieck, 2005)
- Selenophaedusa thatkheana (Bavay & Dautzenberg, 1899)
