= Euxinastra =

Scientific classification
- Kingdom: Animalia
- Phylum: Mollusca
- Class: Gastropoda
- Order: Stylommatophora
- Family: Clausiliidae
- Genus: Euxinastra; Boettger, 1888

Genus of gastropods

Euxinastra is a genus of air-breathing land snail with a clausilium, a terrestrial pulmonate gastropod mollusk in the family Clausiliidae, the door snails.

== Subgenera ==
- Euxinastra
  - Euxinastra fartilis Loosjes 1963
  - Euxinastra hamata (O. Boettger 1888) - type species
  - Euxinastra sumelae Neubert 1993
- Odonteuxina
  - Odonteuxina harchbelica Páll-Gergely 2010
  - Odonteuxina iberica (Roth 1850)
