= Filosa (gastropod) =

Scientific classification
- Kingdom: Animalia
- Phylum: Mollusca
- Class: Gastropoda
- Order: Stylommatophora
- Family: Clausiliidae
- Subfamily: Clausiliinae
- Tribe: Filosini
- Genus: Filosa; O. Boettger, 1877

Type species
- Clausilia filosa Mousson, 1863

Genus of door snails

Filosa (from Latin filum, "thread") is a monotypic, West Asian genus of small, air-breathing land snails, terrestrial pulmonate gastropod molluscs in the family Clausiliidae, commonly known as door snails. The genus is recorded from the eastern Black Sea region, from north-eastern Turkey to south-western Georgia. The genus contains the single accepted species Filosa filosa (Mousson, 1863).

Like other clausiliids, members of the genus have sinistral (left-coiling) shells and a specialised internal closing apparatus, the clausilium.

== Taxonomy ==
Filosa was established by Oskar Boettger in 1877. Its type species, by monotypy, is Clausilia filosa Mousson, 1863, now accepted as Filosa filosa (Mousson, 1863).

== Description ==
The shell of Filosa has a fully denticulate peristome, an upper lamella connected with the spiralis, a reduced basal lunella, and a clausilium plate with an oblique ridge on the outer surface. The shell characters of the genus are relatively conservative, whereas the genital anatomy is more specialised.

== Distribution and habitat ==
Filosa filosa is known from the eastern Black Sea region. Published Turkish records include localities in Giresun, Trabzon, Rize and Artvin provinces, including Tirebolu Castle, near Of, Pazar, Derepazarı and Hopa. In Georgia, the species is recorded in Adjara.

The type locality, "Chysirkaleh", has been interpreted as an unidentified locality somewhere south-west of Batumi in Adjara. The habitat is also recorded as Colchic deciduous forests, on decaying tree trunks and in leaf litter.
