= Strumosa =

Scientific classification
- Kingdom: Animalia
- Phylum: Mollusca
- Class: Gastropoda
- Order: Stylommatophora
- Family: Clausiliidae
- Genus: Strumosa; Boettger, 1877

Genus of land snails

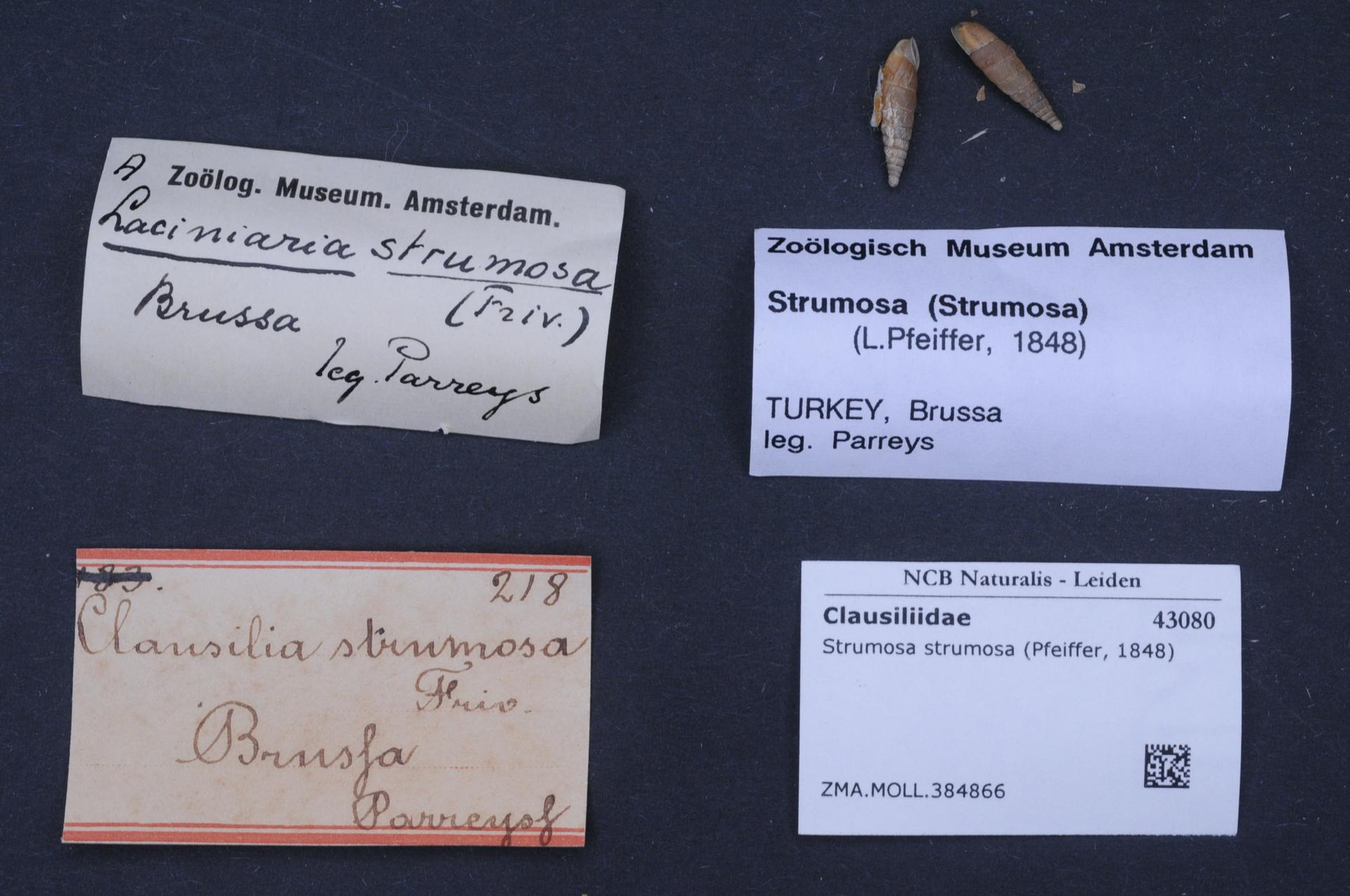
Specimen of Strumosa strumosa

Strumosa is a genus of gastropods belonging to the family Clausiliidae.

The species of this genus are found in Turkey.

Species:

- Strumosa abanti (Brandt, 1961)
- Strumosa meridiana Schütt, 2002
- Strumosa strumosa (Pfeiffer, 1848)
