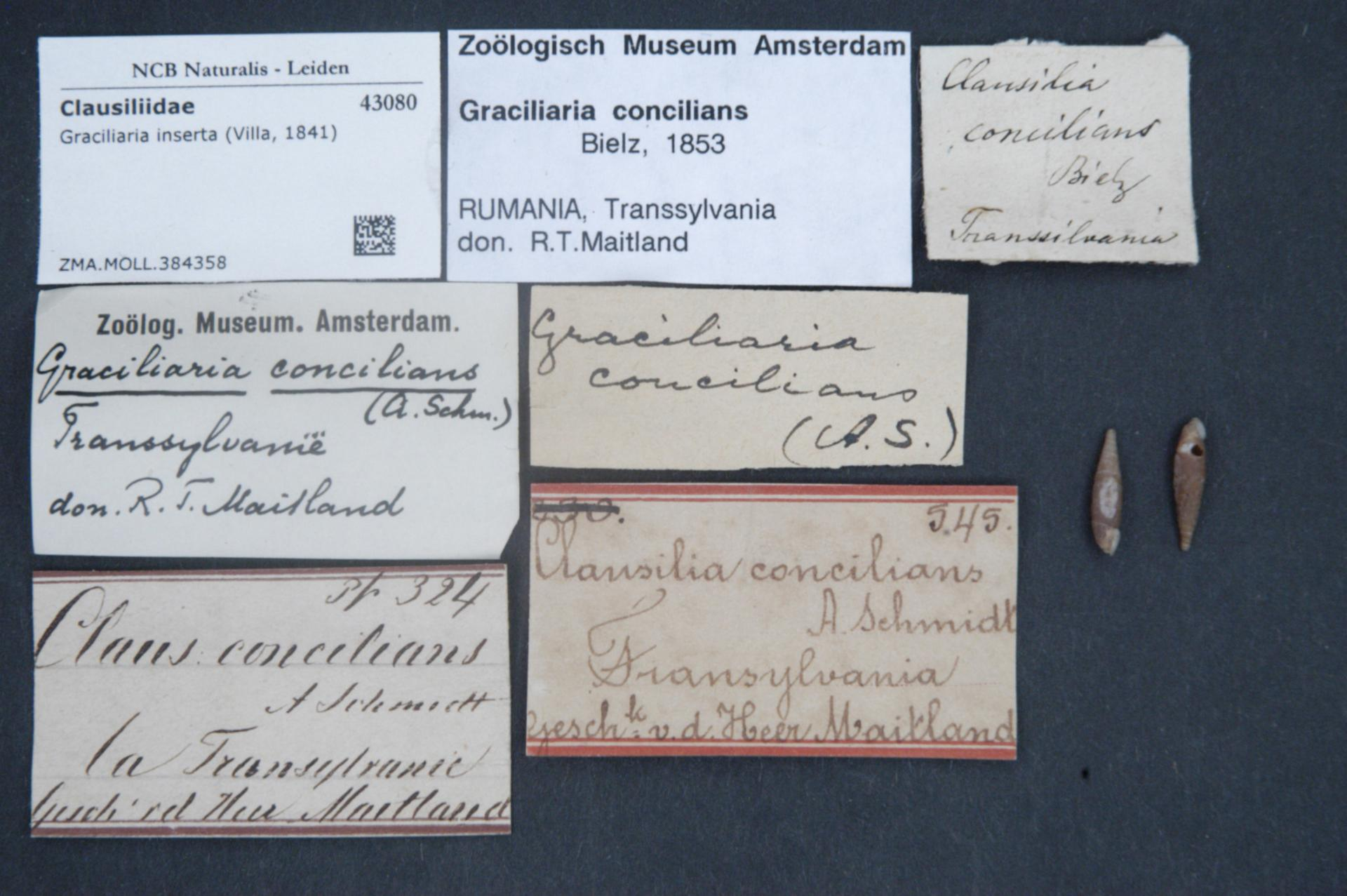
- Graciliaria inserta

Scientific classification
- Domain: Eukaryota
- Kingdom: Animalia
- Phylum: Mollusca
- Class: Gastropoda
- Order: Stylommatophora
- Family: Clausiliidae
- Genus: Graciliaria; Bielz, 1867
- Species: G. inserta

Binomial name
- Graciliaria inserta (A.Villa & J.B.Villa, 1841)

= Graciliaria =

Genus of land snails

Graciliaria is a monotypic genus of gastropods belonging to the family Clausiliidae. The only species is Graciliaria inserta.

The species is found in Central Europe.
