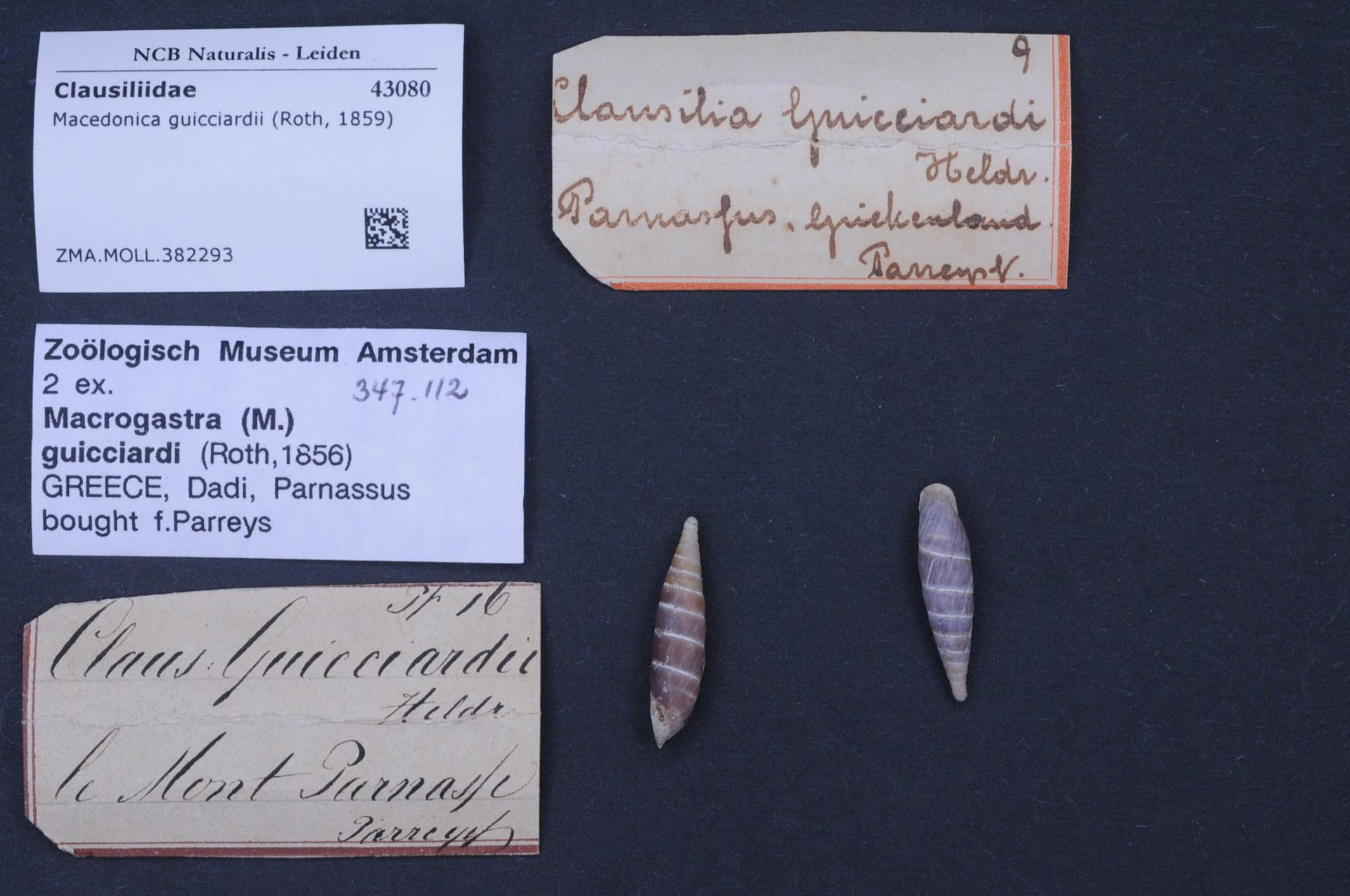
- M. guicciardii

Scientific classification
- Domain: Eukaryota
- Kingdom: Animalia
- Phylum: Mollusca
- Class: Gastropoda
- Order: Stylommatophora
- Family: Clausiliidae
- Genus: Macedonica; Boettger, 1877

= Macedonica =

Genus of land snails

Macedonica is a genus of gastropods belonging to the family Clausiliidae.

The species of this genus are found in the Balkans.

Species:

- Macedonica brabeneci H.Nordsieck, 1977
- Macedonica dobrostanica Irikov, 2012
- Macedonica frauenfeldi (Rossmässler, 1856)
- Macedonica guicciardii (J.R.Roth, 1856)
- Macedonica hartmuti Irikov, 2003
- Macedonica macedonica (Rossmässler, 1839)
- Macedonica marginata (Rossmässler, 1835)
- Macedonica martae Sajó, 1968
- Macedonica pindica E.Gittenberger, 2002
- Macedonica pinteri Sajó, 1968
- Macedonica pirinensis S.H.F.Jaeckel, 1954
- Macedonica pirotana (Pavlović, 1912)
- Macedonica schatzmayri (A.J.Wagner, 1914)
- Macedonica slavica H.Nordsieck, 1974
- Macedonica teodorae Irikov, 2006
- Macedonica thasia H.Nordsieck, 1977
- Macedonica ypsilon H.Nordsieck, 1977
- Macedonica zilchi Urbański, 1972
