= Tsoukatosia =

Scientific classification
- Kingdom: Animalia
- Phylum: Mollusca
- Class: Gastropoda
- Order: Stylommatophora
- Family: Clausiliidae
- Genus: Tsoukatosia; Gittenberger, 2000

Genus of gastropods

Tsoukatosia is a genus of gastropods belonging to the family Clausiliidae.

The species of this genus are found in Greece.

Species:

- Tsoukatosia arabatzis A.Reischütz & P.L.Reischütz, 2014
- Tsoukatosia argolica A.Reischütz, P.L.Reischütz & Szekeres, 2016
- Tsoukatosia brandtstetteri A.Reischütz, P.L.Reischütz & Szekeres, 2018
- Tsoukatosia christinae A.Reischütz & P.L.Reischütz, 2003
- Tsoukatosia evauemgei N.Reischütz, A.Reischütz & P.L.Reischütz, 2012
- Tsoukatosia feheri A.Reischütz, P.L.Reischütz & Szekeres, 2018
- Tsoukatosia liae E.Gittenberger, 2000
- Tsoukatosia nicoleae A.Reischütz, P.L.Reischütz & Szekeres, 2016
- Tsoukatosia pallgergelyi A.Reischütz, P.L.Reischütz & Szekeres, 2016
- Tsoukatosia subaii Hunyadi & Szekeres, 2009
