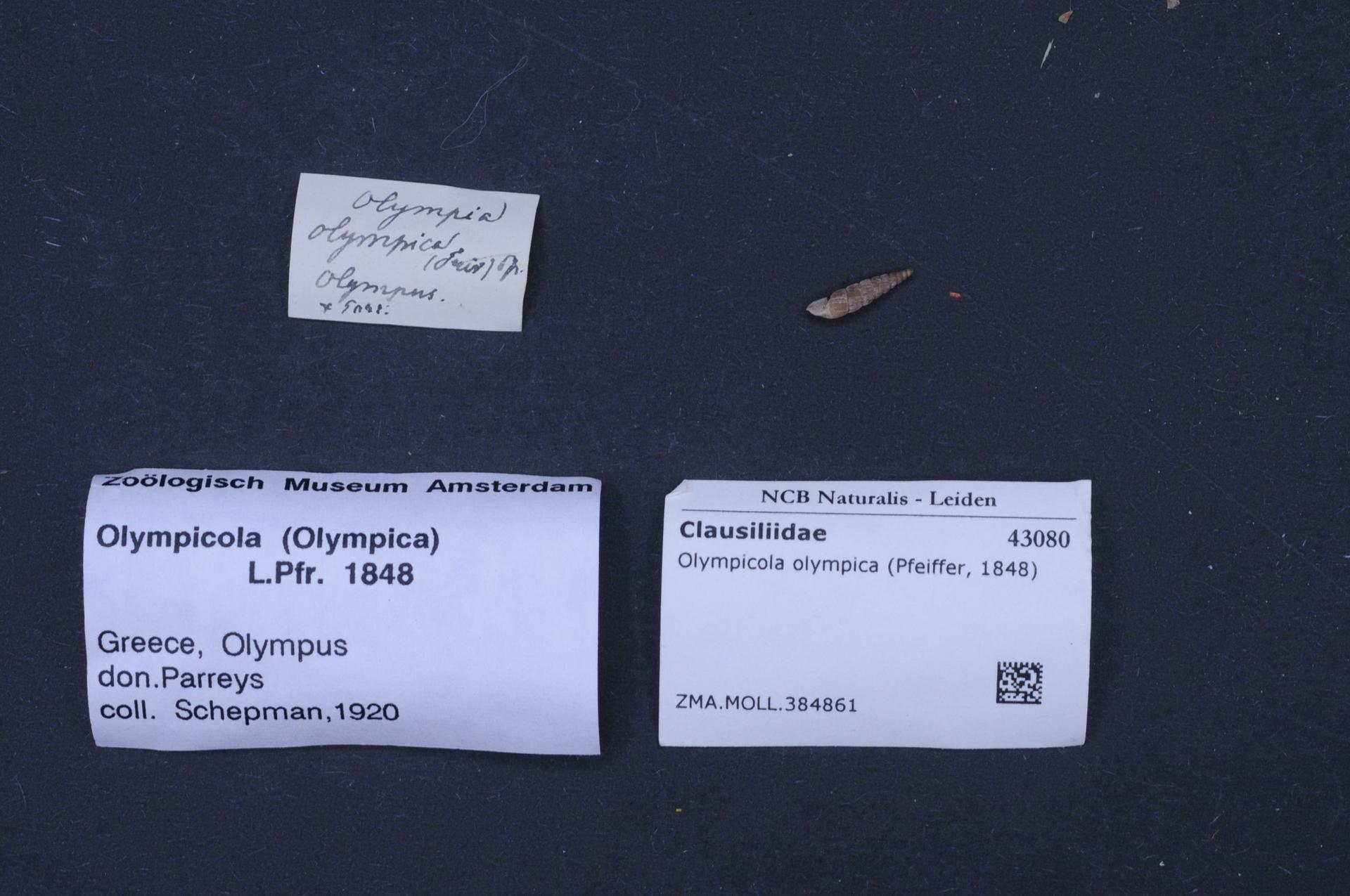

Scientific classification
- Kingdom: Animalia
- Phylum: Mollusca
- Class: Gastropoda
- Order: Stylommatophora
- Family: Clausiliidae
- Genus: Olympicola; Hesse, 1916
- Species: O. olympica

Binomial name
- Olympicola olympica (Pfeiffer, 1848)

= Olympicola =

Genus of land snails

Olympicola is a monotypic genus of gastropods belonging to the family Clausiliidae. The only species is Olympicola olympica.

The species is found in Turkey.
