= Mentissella =

Scientific classification
- Kingdom: Animalia
- Phylum: Mollusca
- Class: Gastropoda
- Order: Stylommatophora
- Family: Clausiliidae
- Genus: Mentissella; Nordsieck, 1973
- Species: M. rebeli

Binomial name
- Mentissella rebeli (Sturany, 1897)

Genus of molluscs

Mentissella is a monotypic genus of gastropods belonging to the family Clausiliidae. The only species is Mentissella rebeli.

The species inhabits terrestrial environments.
