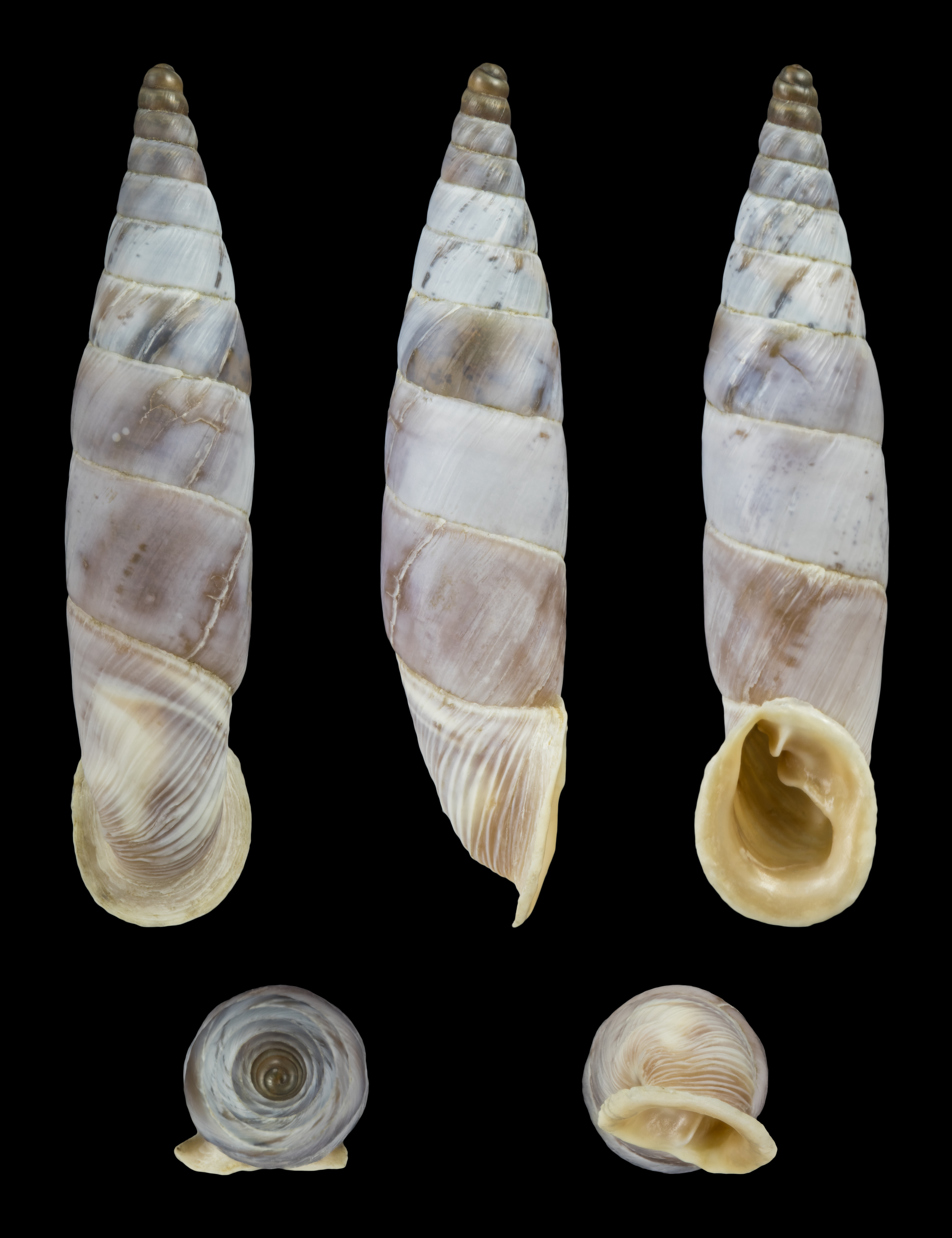
- Medora almissana

Scientific classification
- Domain: Eukaryota
- Kingdom: Animalia
- Phylum: Mollusca
- Class: Gastropoda
- Order: Stylommatophora
- Family: Clausiliidae
- Genus: Medora; H.Adams & A.Adams, 1855

= Medora (gastropod) =

Genus of land snails

Medora is a genus of gastropods belonging to the family Clausiliidae.

The species of this genus are found in South Europe and Mediterranean.

Species:

- Medora adensameri H.Nordsieck, 2009
- Medora agnata (L.Pfeiffer, 1842)
- Medora almissana (Küster, 1847)
- Medora armata (Küster, 1844)
- Medora contracta (Rossmässler, 1842)
- Medora dalmatina (Rossmässler, 1835)
- Medora eris (L.Pfeiffer, 1866)
- Medora garganensis (A.J.Wagner, 1918)
- Medora hiltrudae H.Nordsieck, 1970
- Medora italiana (Küster, 1847)
- Medora lesinensis (Küster, 1847)
- Medora macascarensis (G.B.Sowerby I, 1828)
- Medora milettiana Giusti, 1967
- Medora pollinensis H.Nordsieck, 2012
- Medora proxima (Walderdorff, 1864)
- Medora punctulata (Küster, 1850)
- Medora stenostoma (Rossmässler, 1839)
