= Agathylla =

Scientific classification
- Domain: Eukaryota
- Kingdom: Animalia
- Phylum: Mollusca
- Class: Gastropoda
- Order: Stylommatophora
- Family: Clausiliidae
- Genus: Agathylla; H.Adams & A.Adams, 1855

Genus of land snails

Agathylla is a genus of gastropods belonging to the family Clausiliidae.

The species of this genus are found in Europe, Japan.

Species:

- Agathylla abrupta (Küster, 1847)
- Agathylla biloba (A.J.Wagner, 1914)
- Agathylla exarata (Rossmässler, 1835)
- Agathylla formosa (Rossmässler, 1835)
- Agathylla goldi (Walderdorff, 1864)
- Agathylla lamellosa (J.A.Wagner, 1829)
- Agathylla narentana (A.Schmidt, 1868)
- Agathylla neutra (Westerlund, 1898)
- Agathylla regularis (L.Pfeiffer, 1861)
- Agathylla strigillata (Rossmässler, 1835)
- Agathylla sulcosa (J.A.Wagner, 1829)
- Agathylla viperina (Westerlund, 1901)
