= Pontophaedusella =

Scientific classification
- Kingdom: Animalia
- Phylum: Mollusca
- Class: Gastropoda
- Order: Stylommatophora
- Family: Clausiliidae
- Genus: Pontophaedusella; H. Nordsieck, 1994

Genus of gastropods

Pontophaedusella is a monotypic genus of air-breathing land snails, terrestrial pulmonate gastropod mollusks in the family Clausiliidae, the door snails, all of which have a clausilium.

== Species ==
The sole species belonging to this genus is Pontophaedusella offenses Nordsieck 1994. This species is known only from the type locality ("Prov. Trabzon, FF 03, 2 km SW Of"). The anatomy of Pontophaedusella ofensis was described by Szekeres (1998).
