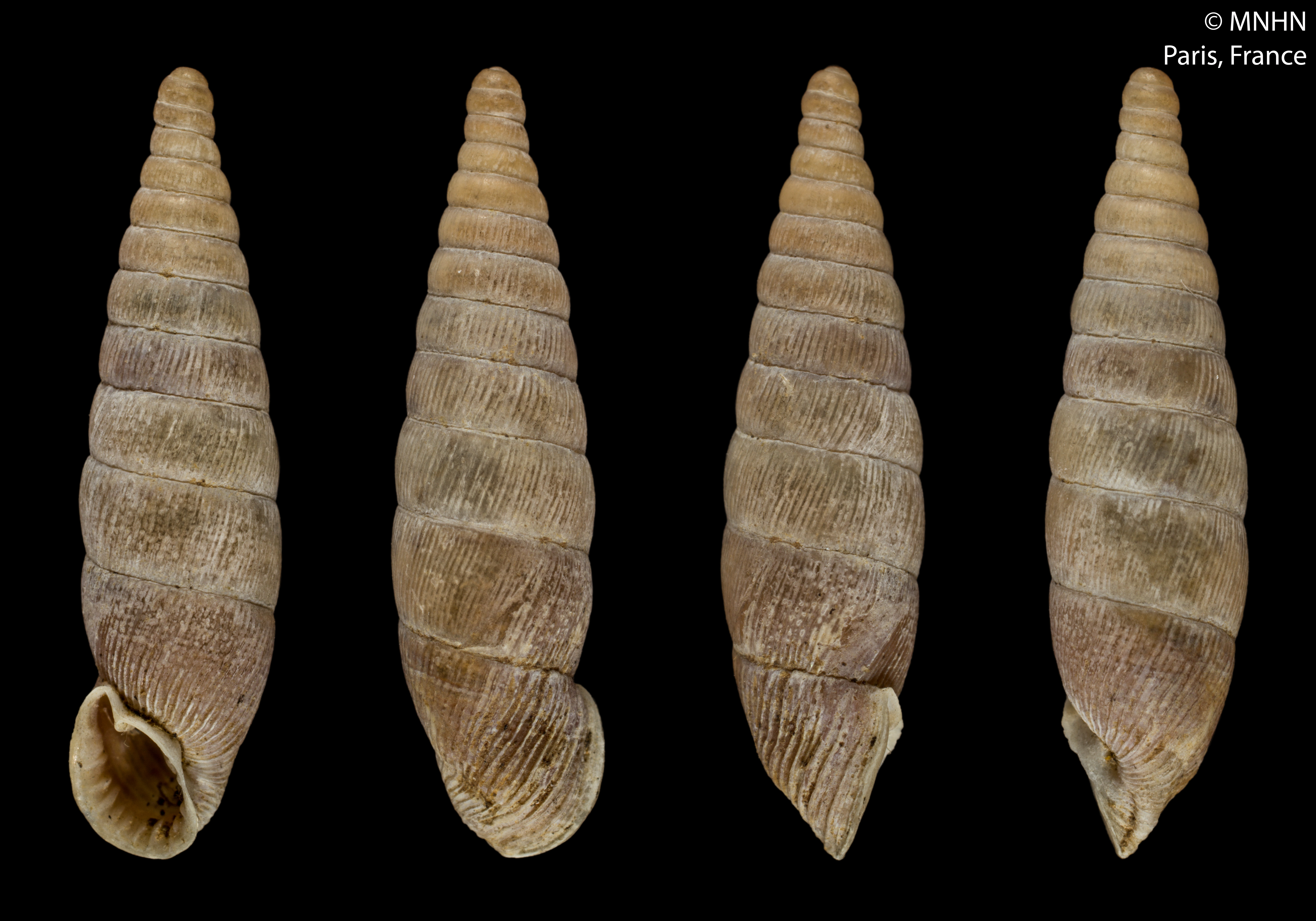
- Shell of Strigillaria denticulata (specimen at MNHN, Paris)

Scientific classification
- Kingdom: Animalia
- Phylum: Mollusca
- Class: Gastropoda
- Order: Stylommatophora
- Infraorder: Clausilioidei
- Superfamily: Clausilioidea
- Family: Clausiliidae
- Genus: Strigillaria; BoettgerVest, 1867

Synonyms
- Bulgarica O. Boettger, 1877; Bulgarica (Bulgarica) O. Boettger, 1877 (junior synonym); Bulgarica (Denticularia) Lindholm, 1924; Bulgarica (Strigilecula) Kennard & B.B. Woodward, 1923; Clausilia (Strigillaria) Vest, 1867; Denticularia Lindholm, 1924; Idylopsina Lindholm, 1924; Laciniaria (Bulgarica) O. Boettger, 1877 (unaccepted rank); Laciniaria (Denticularia) Lindholm, 1924 (a junior synonym); Laciniaria (Idylopsina) Lindholm, 1924 (original rank); Strigilecula Kennard & B.B. Woodward, 1923; Strigillaria (Bulgarica) O. Boettger, 1877 · alternate representation; Strigillaria (Denticularia) Lindholm, 1924 · alternate representation; Strigillaria (Strigillaria) Vest, 1867 · alternate representation

= Strigillaria =

Genus of gastropods

Strigillaria is a genus of gastropods belonging to subfamily Clausiliinae of the family Clausiliidae.

== Species ==
- Strigillaria cana (Held, 1836)
- Strigillaria pseudofraudigera (H. Nordsieck, 1973) (uncertain > taxon inquirendum)
- Strigillaria serbica (Möllendorff, 1873)
- Strigillaria stolii (L. Pfeiffer, 1859)
- Strigillaria vetusta (Rossmässler, 1836)

Synonyms

- Strigillaria bulgariensis (L. Pfeiffer, 1848): synonym of Bulgarica bulgariensis (L. Pfeiffer, 1848) (superseded combination)
- Strigillaria denticulata (Olivier, 1801): synonym of Bulgarica denticulata (Olivier, 1801) (unaccepted > superseded combination)
- Strigillaria erberi (Frauenfeld, 1867): synonym of Strigillaria denticulata erberi (Frauenfeld, 1867) (superseded taxonomic position)
- Strigillaria fraudigera (Rossmässler, 1839): synonym of Bulgarica fraudigera (Rossmässler, 1839) (unaccepted > superseded combination)
- Strigillaria fritillaria (Frivaldsky, 1835): synonym of Bulgarica fritillaria (Frivaldszky, 1835) (unaccepted > superseded combination)
- Strigillaria hemmenorum (H. Nordsieck, 2015): synonym of Bulgarica hemmenorum H. Nordsieck, 2015 (unaccepted > superseded combination)
- Strigillaria hiltrudae (H. Nordsieck, 1974): synonym of Bulgarica hiltrudae H. Nordsieck, 1974 (unaccepted > superseded combination)
- Strigillaria iniucunda (R. A. Brandt, 1962): synonym of Bulgarica iniucunda (R. A. Brandt, 1962) (unaccepted > superseded combination)
- Strigillaria moellendorffi (H. Nordsieck, 1972): synonym of Strigillaria serbica (Möllendorff, 1873) (invalid; unnecessary replacement name)
- Strigillaria mystica (Westerlund, 1893): synonym of Strigillaria thessalonica mystica (Westerlund, 1893) (superseded taxonomic position)
- Strigillaria pindica (H. Nordsieck, 1974): synonym of Bulgarica pindica H. Nordsieck, 1974 (unaccepted > superseded combination)
- Strigillaria rugicollis (Rossmässler, 1836): synonym of Bulgarica rugicollis (Rossmässler, 1836) (unaccepted > superseded combination)
- Strigillaria thessalonica (Rossmässler, 1839): synonym of Bulgarica thessalonica (Rossmässler, 1839) (superseded combinatio
- Strigillaria urbanskii (H. Nordsieck, 1973): synonym of Bulgarica urbanskii H. Nordsieck, 1973 (unaccepted > superseded combination)
- Strigillaria varnensis (L. Pfeiffer, 1848): synonym of Bulgarica varnensis (L. Pfeiffer, 1848) (unaccepted > superseded combination)
