= Protoherilla =

Scientific classification
- Kingdom: Animalia
- Phylum: Mollusca
- Class: Gastropoda
- Order: Stylommatophora
- Family: Clausiliidae
- Genus: Protoherilla; A. J. Wagner, 1921

Genus of land snails

Protoherilla is a genus of gastropods belonging to the family Clausiliidae.

The species of this genus are found in the Balkans.

Species:

- Protoherilla baleiformis (Boettger, 1909)
- Protoherilla mirabilis (Nordsieck, 1972)
- Protoherilla pseudofallax (Nordsieck, 1972)
