= Idyla =

Scientific classification
- Domain: Eukaryota
- Kingdom: Animalia
- Phylum: Mollusca
- Class: Gastropoda
- Order: Stylommatophora
- Family: Clausiliidae
- Genus: Idyla; H.Adams & A.Adams, 1855

Genus of molluscs

Idyla is a genus of gastropods belonging to the family Clausiliidae.

The species of this genus are found in Southern Europe, Western Asia and North America.

Species:

- Idyla aydinensis Oerstan, 2008
- Idyla bicristata (Rossmässler, 1839)
- Idyla castalia (Roth, 1856)
- Idyla liebegottae Nordsieck, 1994
- Idyla pelobsoleta Gittenberger, 1993
