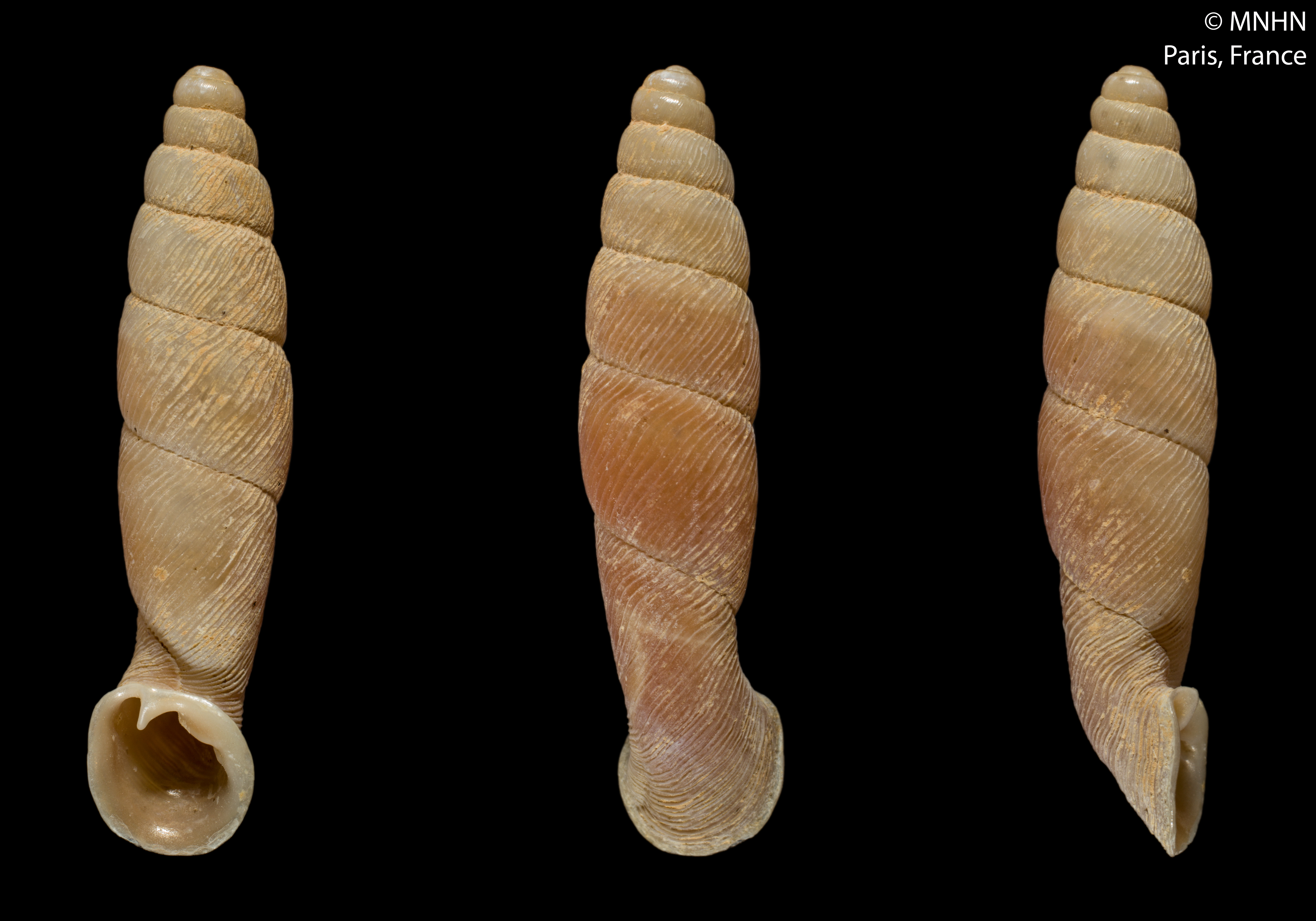
- Shell of Grandinenia amoena (holotype at MNHN, Paris)
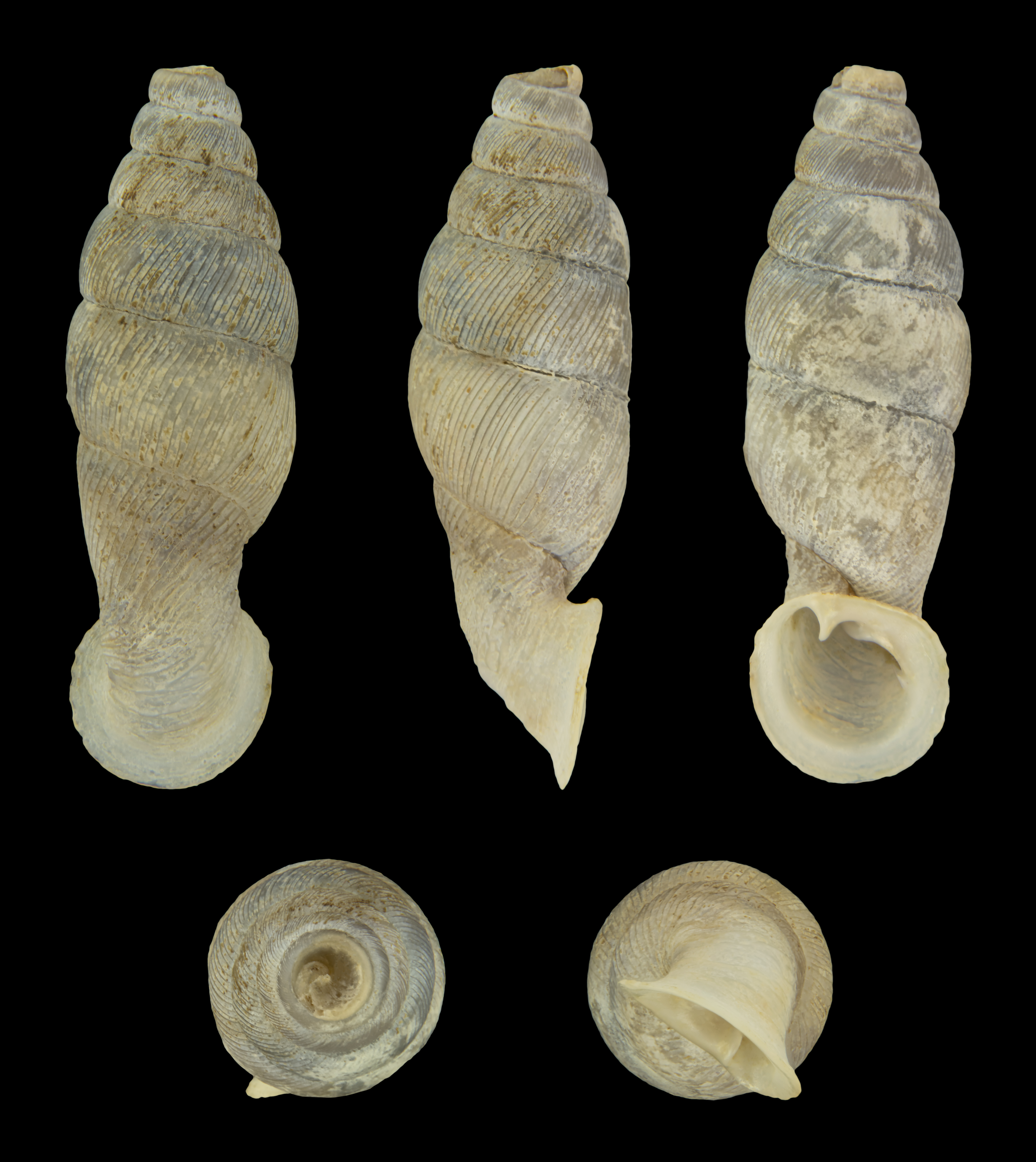
- Grandinenia fuchsi

Scientific classification
- Kingdom: Animalia
- Phylum: Mollusca
- Class: Gastropoda
- Order: Stylommatophora
- Infraorder: Clausilioidei
- Superfamily: Clausilioidea
- Family: Clausiliidae
- Genus: Grandinenia; Minato & D.-N. Chen, 1984

Type species
- Steatonenia mirifica D.-N. Chen & J.-X. Gao, 1982

Synonyms
- Neniauchenia H. Nordsieck, 2002; Tropidauchenia (Grandinenia) Minato & D.-N. Chen, 1984 (unaccepted rank); Tropidauchenia (Neniauchenia) H. Nordsieck, 2002 (junior synonym)

= Grandinenia =

Genus of gastropods

Grandinenia is a genus of air-breathing land snails, terrestrial pulmonate gastropod mollusks in the tribe Garnieriini of the subfamily Garnieriinae in the family Clausiliidae, the door snails.

== Species ==
- Grandinenia amoena (H. Nordsieck, 2002)
- Grandinenia ardouiniana (Heude, 1885)
- Grandinenia crassilabris H. Nordsieck, 2016
- Grandinenia dautzenbergi (Morlet, 1892)
- Grandinenia fuchsi (Gredler, 1883)
- Grandinenia gabijakabi Grego & Szekeres, 2014
- Grandinenia gastrum (H. Nordsieck, 2005)
- Grandinenia ignea H. Nordsieck, 2012
- Grandinenia magnilabris H. Nordsieck, 2012
- Grandinenia maroskoi Grego & Szekeres, 2011
- Grandinenia mirifica (D.-N. Chen & J.-X. Gao, 1982)
- Grandinenia muratovi Grego & Szekeres, 2019
- Grandinenia ookuboi (H. Nordsieck, 2005)
- Grandinenia pallidissima H. Nordsieck, 2010
- Grandinenia pseudofuchsi (H. Nordsieck, 2005)
- Grandinenia puella H. Nordsieck, 2012
- Grandinenia rex H. Nordsieck, 2007
- Grandinenia rugifera (Möllendorff, 1898)
- Grandinenia rutila H. Nordsieck, 2016
- Grandinenia schomburgi (Schmacker & O. Boettger, 1890)
- Grandinenia steffeki Grego & Szekeres, 2014
- Grandinenia takagii (Chang, 2004)
- Grandinenia tonkinensis (H. Nordsieck, 2010)
- Grandinenia umbra (Chang, 2004)
- Grandinenia unicolor H. Nordsieck, 2012
- Grandinenia yulinensis H. Nordsieck, 2012
