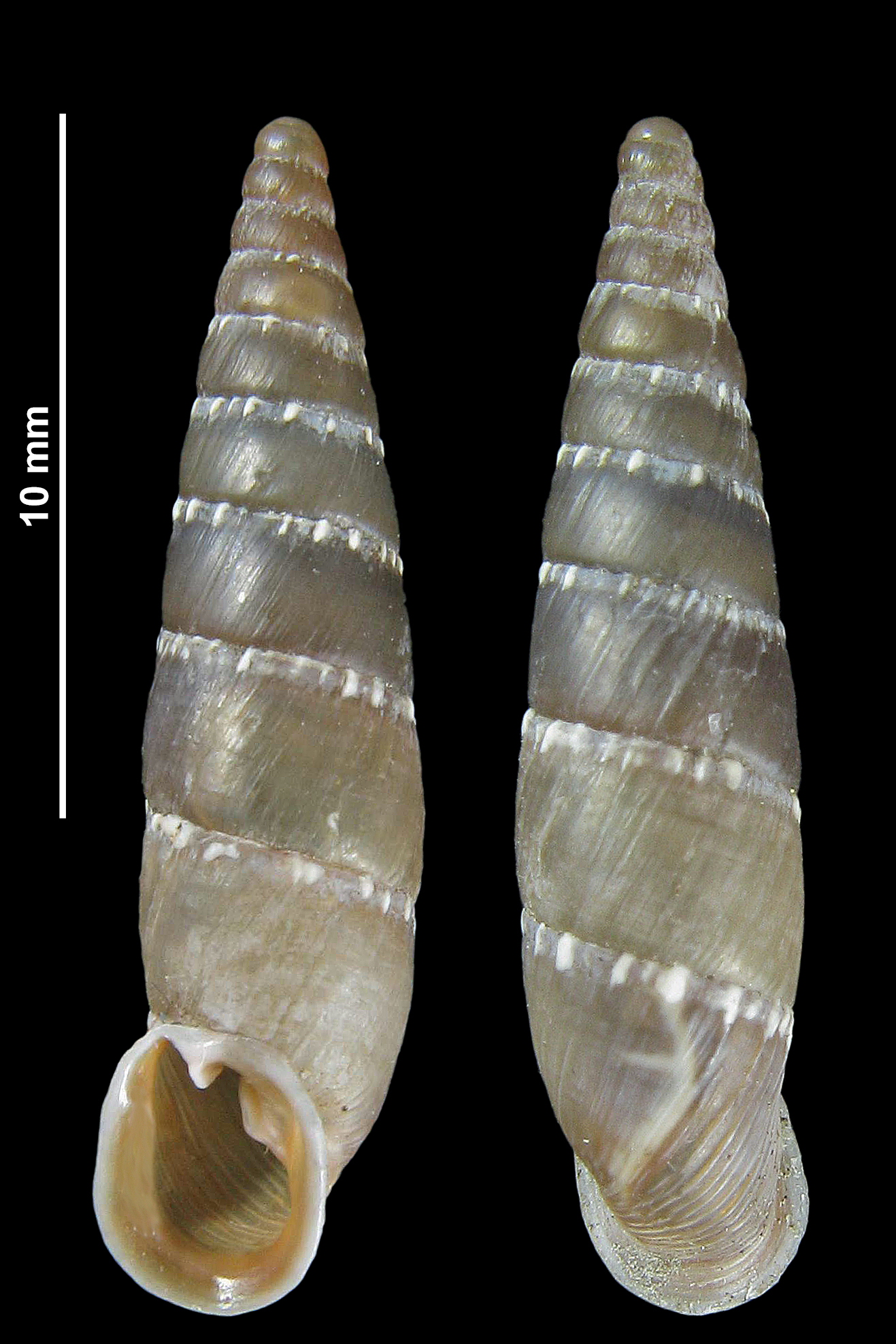
- Shell of Leucostigma candidescens (specimen at MNHN, Paris)

Scientific classification
- Kingdom: Animalia
- Phylum: Mollusca
- Class: Gastropoda
- Order: Stylommatophora
- Infraorder: Clausilioidei
- Superfamily: Clausilioidea
- Family: Clausiliidae
- Genus: Leucostigma; A. J. Wagner, 1919

= Leucostigma =

Genus of gastropods

Leucostigma is a genus of air-breathing land snails, terrestrial pulmonate gastropod mollusks in the family Clausiliidae, the door snails.

This taxon occurs off Nîmes, France.

== Species ==
- Leucostigma candidescens (Rossmässler, 1835)

Subspecies

- Leucostigma candidescens candidescens (Rossmässler, 1835)
- Leucostigma candidescens convertitum (Flach, 1907)
- Leucostigma candidescens dextromira H. Nordsieck, 2011
- Leucostigma candidescens leucostigma (Rossmässler, 1836)
- Leucostigma candidescens megachilus (Paulucci, 1881)
- Leucostigma candidescens monticola H. Nordsieck, 2011
- Leucostigma candidescens opalinum (Rossmässler, 1836)
- Leucostigma candidescens paraconvertitum H. Nordsieck, 2011
- Leucostigma candidescens samniticum (Rossmässler, 1842)

Species brought into synonymy

- Leucostigma leucostigma (Rossmässler, 1836): synonym of Leucostigma candidescens leucostigma (Rossmässler, 1836) (superseded combination)

== Sources ==
- Rossmässler, E. A. (1835–1837). Iconographie der Land- & Süßwasser- Mollusken, mit vorzüglicher Berücksichtigung der europäischen noch nicht abgebildeten Arten.
- Bank, R. A. (2017). Classification of the Recent terrestrial Gastropoda of the World. Last update: 16 July 2017
- Bank, R. A.; Neubert, E. (2017). Checklist of the land and freshwater Gastropoda of Europe. Last update: 16 July 2017
