= Strigilodelima =

Scientific classification
- Kingdom: Animalia
- Phylum: Mollusca
- Class: Gastropoda
- Order: Stylommatophora
- Family: Clausiliidae
- Genus: Strigilodelima; A. J. Wagner, 1924

Genus of land snails

Strigilodelima is a genus of gastropods belonging to the family Clausiliidae.

The species of this genus are found in the Balkans.

Species:

- Strigilodelima conspersa (Pfeiffer, 1848)
- Strigilodelima pentheri (Wagner, 1919)
