= Paul Ehrmann =

German zoologist and teacher (1868–1937)

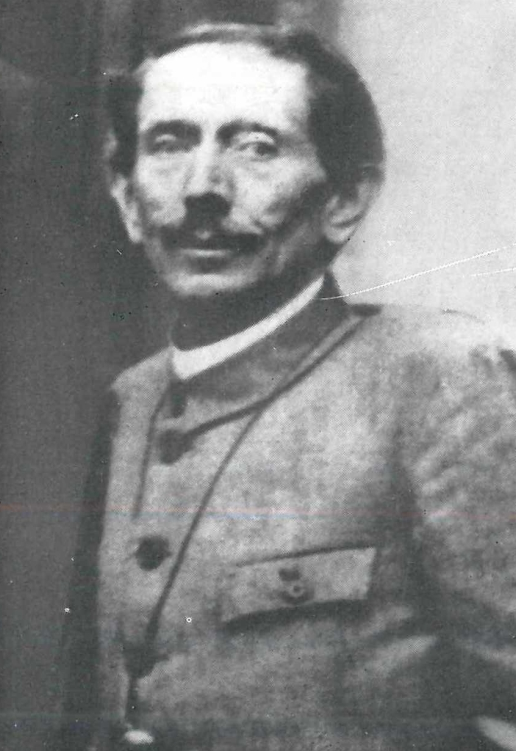

Hermann Felix Paul Ehrmann (21 December 1868 – 6 October 1937) was a German entomologist and malacologist. He worked as a teacher and contributed to the systematics and distribution of molluscs in central Europe.

== Life and work ==
Ehrmann was born in Leipzig where his father Theodor was a mechanic. He taught at a school for the deaf and dumb from 1888 for 12 years and then at a Gaudig girls' school in Leipzig from 1901. Here he won an award for his teaching. He also took an interest in zoology and attended the lectures of Rudolf Leuckart at the University of Leipzig. For some time he worked on the diatom collections made by the Valdivia Expedition in 1899. Along with Heinrich Simroth who guided him from the age of fourteen they began to examine the systematics of molluscs. He co-edited a volume in the series Die Tierwelt Mitteleuropas, Mollusken Mitteleuropas (1933) dealing with the molluscs, particularly in the families Clausiliidae, Pupillidae, and Acmidae. He married his student Lizzie daughter of publisher Paul Spindler in 1890. He went on collecting trips into the Alps and spent some time at the Zoological Station in Naples with a recommendation from Leuckart and a leave granted from his school. He received mollusc specimens from Japan and from Peru. He received an honorary doctorate from the University of Leipzig in 1934. He was known for being available to all his friends at any time on his home on Eisenacher Strasse. He died from a heart attack and his collections are now housed in the Senckenberg Museum.
