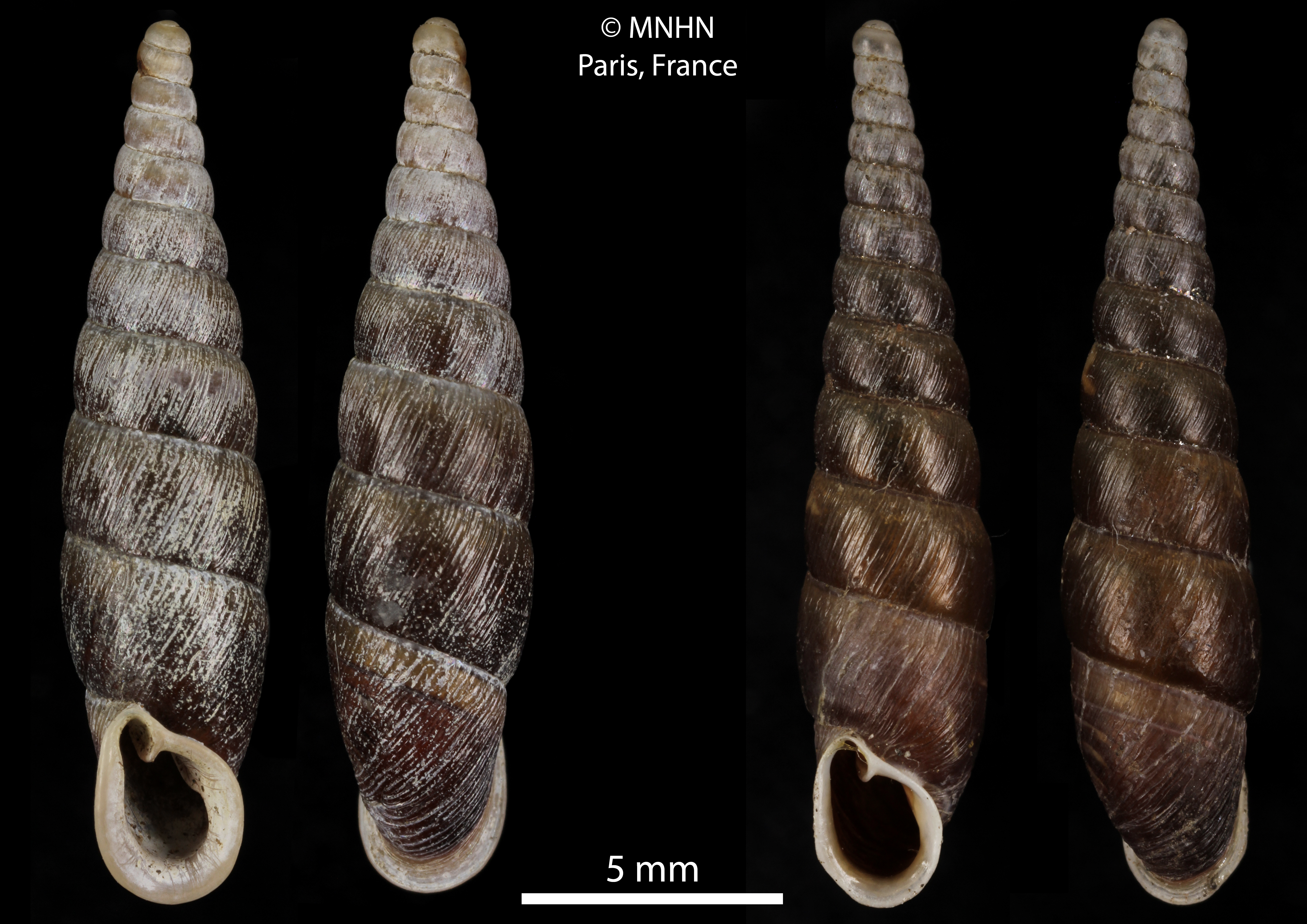
- Shell of Bathyptychia martensi immersa (paratype at MNHN, Paris)

Scientific classification
- Kingdom: Animalia
- Phylum: Mollusca
- Class: Gastropoda
- Order: Stylommatophora
- Family: Clausiliidae
- Genus: Bathyptychia; Lindholm, 1925

Synonyms
- Bathyptychia (Bathyptychia) Lindholm, 1925· accepted, alternate representation; Bathyptychia (Brachyptychia) H. Nordsieck, 2001· accepted, alternate representation; Bathyptychia (Strictiphaedusa) H. Nordsieck, 2001· accepted, alternate representation; Phaedusa (Bathyptychia) Lindholm, 1925 (original rank)

= Bathyptychia =

Genus of gastropods

Bathyptychia is a genus of medium-sized air-breathing land snails, terrestrial pulmonate gastropod mollusks in the family Clausiliidae, the door snails, all of which have a clausilium.

== Species ==
Species within the genus Bathyptychia include:

- Bathyptychia aplostoma (Heude, 1885)
- Bathyptychia beresowskii (Möllendorff, 1902)
- Bathyptychia breviplica (Möllendorff, 1886)
- Bathyptychia bulimina (Gredler, 1892)
- Bathyptychia hupeana (Gredler, 1892)
- Bathyptychia hupecola (Gredler, 1888)
- Bathyptychia infantilis (Gredler, 1890)
- Bathyptychia martensi H. Nordsieck, 2001
- Bathyptychia mira H. Nordsieck, 2003
- Bathyptychia ookuboi Hunyadi & Szekeres, 2016
- Bathyptychia provisoria (Gredler, 1888)
- Bathyptychia recens (Gredler, 1894)
- Bathyptychia septentrionalis H. Nordsieck, 2016
- Bathyptychia strictilabris (Schmacker & O. Boettger, 1890)
