= Elia (gastropod) =

Scientific classification
- Domain: Eukaryota
- Kingdom: Animalia
- Phylum: Mollusca
- Class: Gastropoda
- Order: Stylommatophora
- Family: Clausiliidae
- Genus: Elia; H.Adams & A.Adams, 1855

Genus of land snails

Elia is a genus of gastropods belonging to the family Clausiliidae.

The species of this genus are found in Eastern Mediterranean and near Black Sea.

Species:

- Elia corpulenta (L.Pfeiffer, 1848)
- Elia derasa (Mousson, 1863)
- Elia huebneri (L.Pfeiffer, 1848)
- Elia laevestriata (Retowski, 1887)
- Elia moesta (Rossmässler, 1839)
- Elia multiserrata (O.Boettger, 1896)
- Elia novorossica (Retowski, 1888)
- Elia ossetica (Mousson, 1863)
- Elia retowskii H.Nordsieck, 1984
- Elia somchetica (L.Pfeiffer, 1846)
- Elia tuschetica (Likharev & Lezhawa, 1961)
