= Graecophaedusa =

Scientific classification
- Domain: Eukaryota
- Kingdom: Animalia
- Phylum: Mollusca
- Class: Gastropoda
- Order: Stylommatophora
- Family: Clausiliidae
- Genus: Graecophaedusa; Rähle, 1982
- Species: G. sperrlei

Binomial name
- Graecophaedusa sperrlei Rähle, 1982

Genus of land snails

Graecophaedusa is a monotypic genus of gastropods belonging to the family Clausiliidae. The only species is Graecophaedusa sperrlei.

The species is found in Greece.
