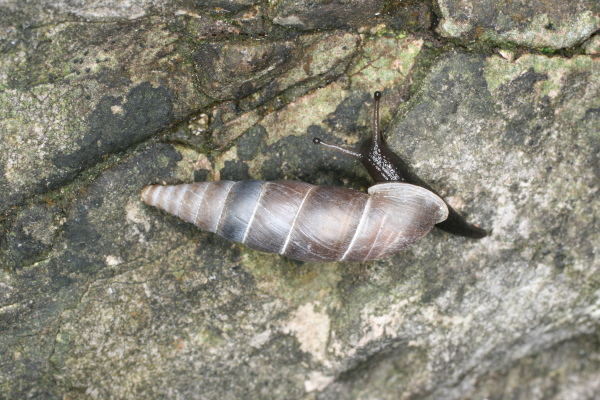
- Herilla bosniensis

Scientific classification
- Domain: Eukaryota
- Kingdom: Animalia
- Phylum: Mollusca
- Class: Gastropoda
- Order: Stylommatophora
- Family: Clausiliidae
- Genus: Herilla; H.Adams & A.Adams, 1855

= Herilla =

Genus of land snails

Herilla is a genus of gastropods belonging to the family Clausiliidae.

The species of this genus are found in the Balkans.

Species:

- Herilla bosniensis (Vest, 1867)
- Herilla durmitoris (Boettger, 1909)
- Herilla illyrica (Möllendorff, 1899)
- Herilla jabucica (Boettger, 1907)
- Herilla pavlovici (Wagner, 1914)
- Herilla ziegleri (Küster, 1845)
