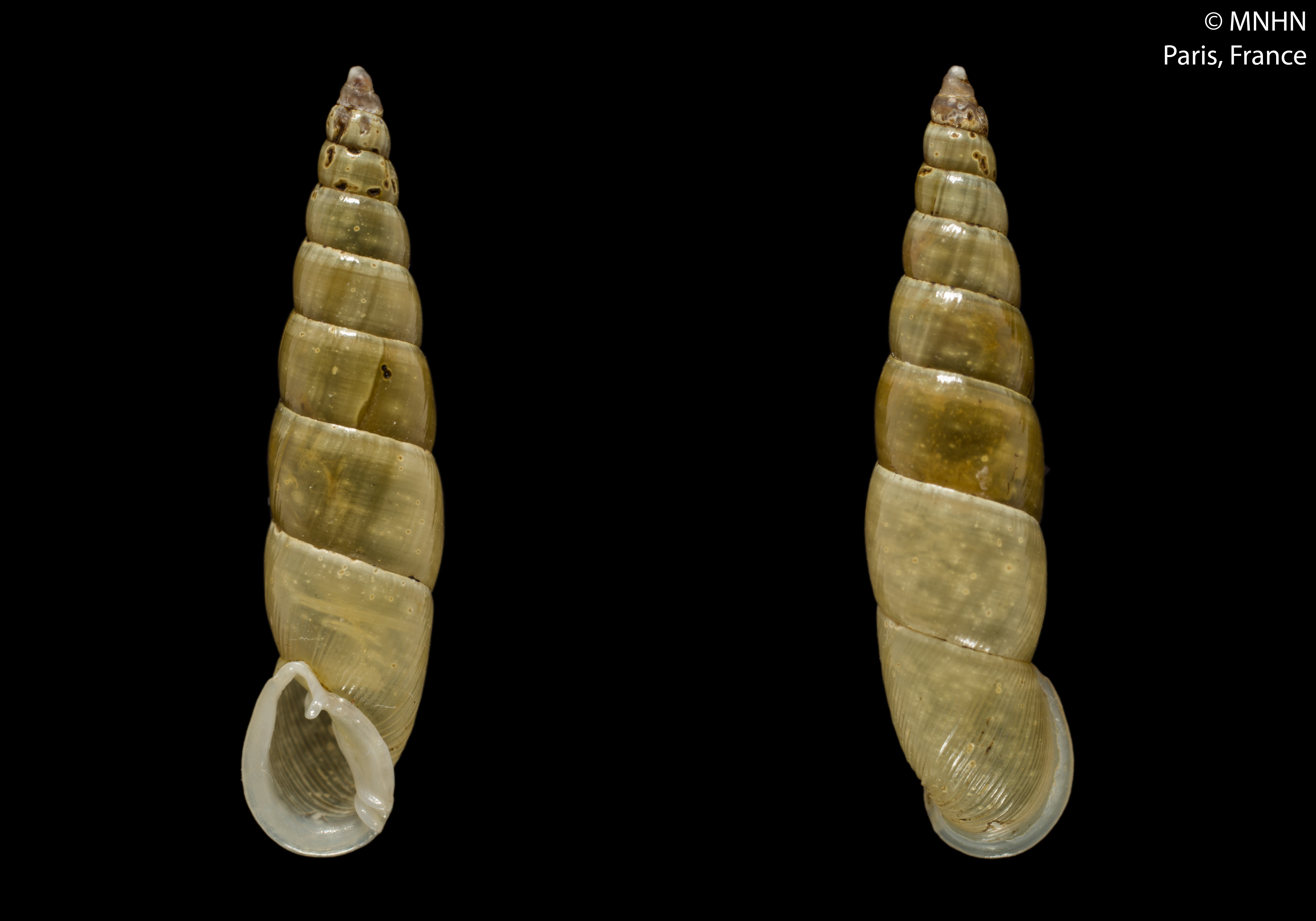
- Shell of Messageriella gargominyi (holotype at MNHN, Paris)

Scientific classification
- Kingdom: Animalia
- Phylum: Mollusca
- Class: Gastropoda
- Order: Stylommatophora
- Infraorder: Clausilioidei
- Superfamily: Clausilioidea
- Family: Clausiliidae
- Genus: Messageriella; Páll-Gergely & Szekeres, 2017

Type species
- Messageriella gargominyi Páll-Gergely & Szekeres, 2017

= Messageriella =

Genus of gastropods

Messageriella is a genus of medium-sized air-breathing land snails, terrestrial pulmonate gastropod mollusks in the subfamily Phaedusinae of the family Clausiliidae, the door snails, all of which have a clausilium.

== Species ==
- Messageriella gargominyi Páll-Gergely & Szekeres, 2017
- Messageriella gregoi (Szekeres & Thach, 2017)
