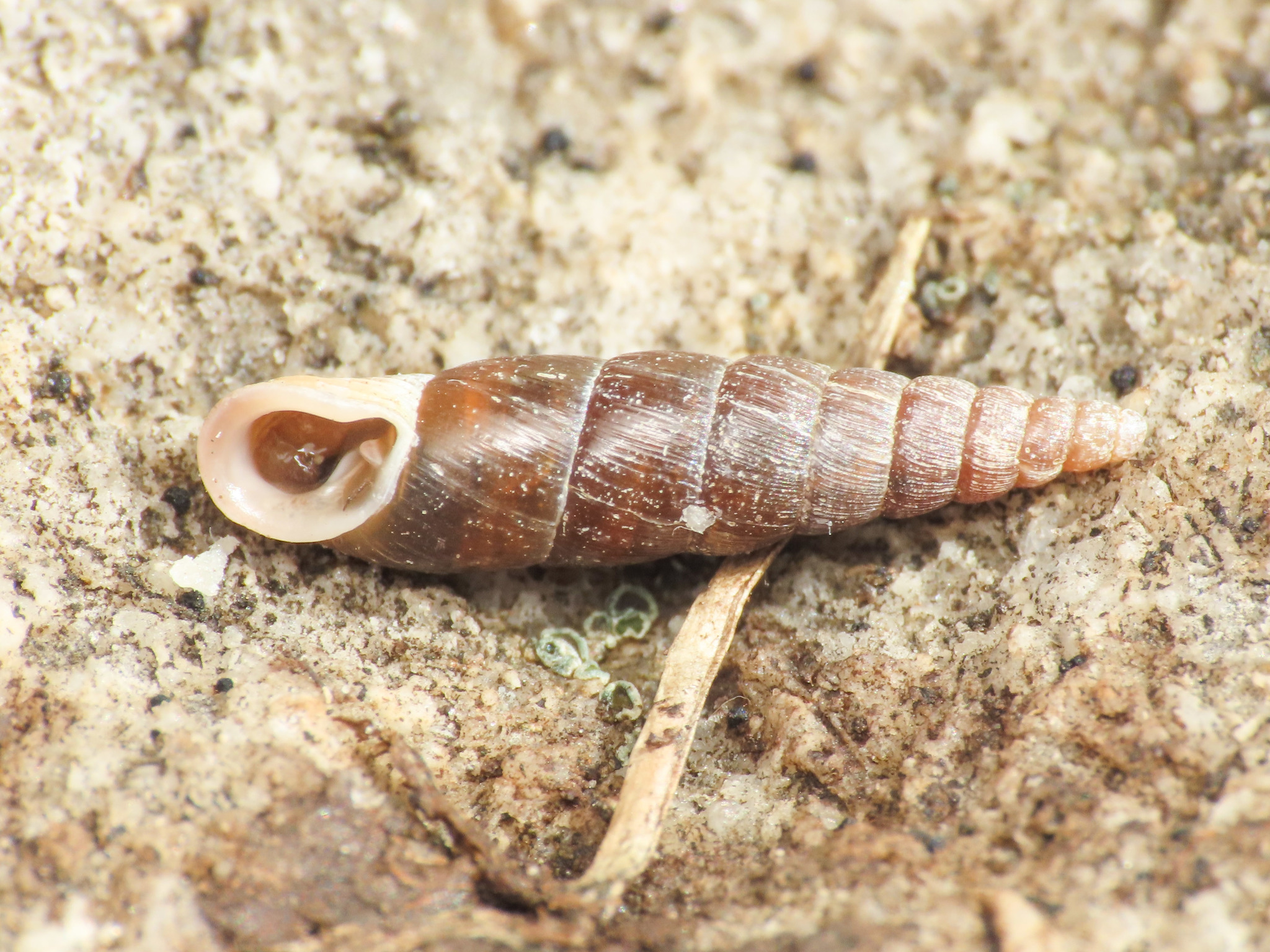
- Dilataria boettgeriana

Scientific classification
- Kingdom: Animalia
- Phylum: Mollusca
- Class: Gastropoda
- Order: Stylommatophora
- Family: Clausiliidae
- Genus: Dilataria; Vest, 1867

= Dilataria =

Genus of land snails

Dilataria is a genus of gastropods belonging to the family Clausiliidae.

The species of this genus are found in Mediterranean.

Species:

- Dilataria boettgeriana (Paulucci, 1878)
- Dilataria bosnica (Brancsik, 1897)
- Dilataria marcki (L.Pfeiffer, 1868)
- Dilataria pirostoma (O.Boettger, 1877)
- Dilataria succineata (Rossmässler, 1836)
