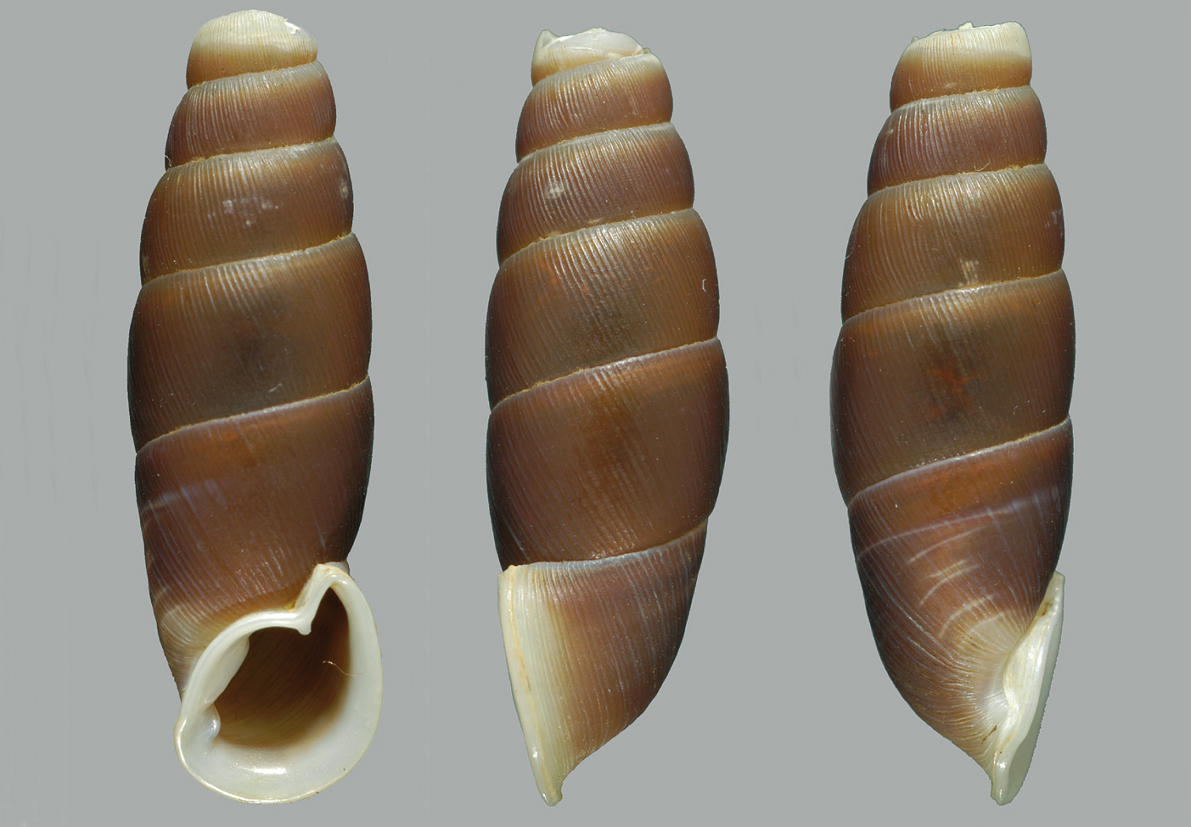
- Oospira duci

Scientific classification
- Kingdom: Animalia
- Phylum: Mollusca
- Class: Gastropoda
- Order: Stylommatophora
- Infraorder: Clausilioidei
- Superfamily: Clausilioidea
- Family: Clausiliidae
- Genus: Oospira; Blanford, 1872

Synonyms
- Acrophaedusa O. Boettger, 1877; Cirrophaedusa Grego & Szekeres, 2011; Clausilia (Acrophaedusa) O. Boettger, 1877 (unaccepted rank); Clausilia (Oospira) W. T. Blanford, 1872; Clausilia (Pseudonenia) O. Boettger, 1877; Distortiphaedusa Grego & Szekeres, 2011; Hemiphaedusa (Lindholmiella) Ehrmann, 1927 (original combination); Leptacme Ehrmann, 1927; Leptocochlea Grego & Szekeres, 2011; Lindholmiella Ehrmann, 1927; Macrenoica A. J. Wagner, 1920; Oospira (Distortiphaedusa) Grego & Szekeres, 2011· accepted, alternate representation; Oospira (Formosanella) H. Nordsieck, 2003· accepted, alternate representation; Oospira (Leptocochlea) Grego & Szekeres, 2011· accepted, alternate representation; Oospira (Lindholmiella) Ehrmann, 1927· accepted, alternate representation; Oospira (Oospira) W. T. Blanford, 1872· accepted, alternate representation; Oospira (Paraformosana) H. Nordsieck, 2003· accepted, alternate representation; Oospira (Siphonophaedusa) Lindholm, 1924· accepted, alternate representation; Phaedusa (Oospira) W.T. Blanford, 1872; Phaedusa (Pseudonenia) O. Boettger, 1877; Phaedusa (Rufospira) Möllendorff, 1883; Phaedusa (Siphonophaedusa) Lindholm, 1924 (original rank); Pseudonenia O. Boettger, 1877; Pseudonenia (Pseudonenia) O. Boettger, 1877; Rufospira Möllendorff, 1883; Siphonophaedusa Lindholm, 1924

= Oospira =

Genus of gastropods

Oospira is a genus of terrestrial gastropods belonging to the subfamily Phaedusinae of the family Clausiliidae.

The species of this genus are found in Asia.

== Species ==
- Oospira abstrusa (Szekeres, 1970)
- Oospira acehensis Dharma & Szekeres, 2009
- Oospira aciculata (Bavay & Dautzenberg, 1909)
- Oospira alticola (E.von Martens, 1892)
- Oospira arakana (Stoliczka, 1872)
- Oospira asaluensis (W.T.Blanford, 1872)
- Oospira asiphonia Nordsieck, 2007
- Oospira baziniana (Heude, 1889)
- Oospira bensoni (H.Adams, 1870)
- Oospira binaria (Heude, 1886)
- Oospira blanfordi H.Nordsieck, 1998
- Oospira bolovenica (Möllendorff, 1898)
- Oospira bouddah (Bavay & Dautzenberg, 1912)
- Oospira brachyptychia (Loosjes, 1953)
- Oospira brevior (L.Pfeiffer, 1868)
- Oospira bulbus (Benson, 1863)
- Oospira butoti Grego & Szekeres, 2009
- Oospira coffea H.Nordsieck, 2012
- Oospira cornea (Küster, 1844)
- Oospira dancei Dharma & Szekeres, 2009
- Oospira decollata (Likharev, 1962)
- Oospira delavayana (Heude, 1885)
- Oospira duci Maasen & Gittenberger, 2007
- Oospira eregia (Szekeres, 1969)
- Oospira ferruginea (W.T.Blanford, 1872)
- Oospira fornicata (Loosjes, 1963)
- Oospira fruhstorferi (Möllendorff, 1897)
- Oospira fusiformis (W.T.Blanford, 1865)
- Oospira gastroptychia (Möllendorff, 1885)
- Oospira gerlachi (Möllendorff, 1881)
- Oospira goniostoma H.Nordsieck, 2016
- Oospira gouldiana (L.Pfeiffer, 1857)
- Oospira gracilenta (Loosjes, 1953)
- Oospira haivanensis Bui & Szekeres, 2019
- Oospira imprimata (Grego & Szekeres, 2011)
- Oospira indurata (Heude, 1886)
- Oospira insignis (Gould, 1843)
- Oospira jacobsoni (Loosjes, 1953)
- Oospira javana (L.Pfeiffer, 1841)
- Oospira jensi H.Nordsieck, 2016
- Oospira jinyungensis (Chen & Zhang, 1999)
- Oospira johorensis (Tomlin, 1939)
- Oospira junghuhni (Küster, 1844)
- Oospira khanhi Nordsieck, 2011
- Oospira lepidospira (Heude, 1889)
- Oospira longispina (Heude, 1885)
- Oospira loosjesi (Zilch, 1954)
- Oospira loosjesiana (Ray & Roychoudhuri, 1968)
- Oospira loxostoma (Benson, 1836)
- Oospira mairei (Bavay & Dautzenberg, 1909)
- Oospira malaisei H.Nordsieck, 1973
- Oospira malleolata H.Nordsieck, 2012
- Oospira mansonensis (Möllendorff, 1901)
- Oospira minutissima Hunyadi & Szekeres, 2016
- Oospira miranda (Loosjes & Loosjes-van Bemmel, 1973)
- Oospira mongmitensis Grego & Szekeres, 2021
- Oospira naga Grego & Szekeres, 2021
- Oospira naggsi Luong & Szekeres, 2014
- Oospira nevilliana (Möllendorff, 1882) (species inquirendum)
- Oospira nubigena (Möllendorff, 1897)
- Oospira obesa (Martens, 1867)
- Oospira ootayoshinarii Hunyadi & Szekeres, 2016
- Oospira orientalis (L.Pfeiffer, 1842)
- Oospira ovata (W.T.Blanford, 1872)
- Oospira oviformis H.Nordsieck, 2011
- Oospira penangensis (Stoliczka, 1873)
- Oospira philippiana (L.Pfeiffer, 1847)
- Oospira phyllostoma (Heude, 1888)
- Oospira pocsi (Szekeres, 1969)
- Oospira raehlei H.Nordsieck, 2013
- Oospira recedens (O.Boettger & Schmacker, 1894)
- Oospira salacana (O.Boettger, 1890)
- Oospira sardicola Grego & Szekeres, 2021
- Oospira scalariformis (Loosjes, 1953)
- Oospira schepmani (Möllendorff, 1897)
- Oospira semipolita (Bavay & Dautzenberg, 1899)
- Oospira siderea (Heude, 1886)
- Oospira stoliczkana (Sykes, 1893)
- Oospira suluana (Möllendorff, 1894)
- Oospira sumatrana (E.Martens, 1864)
- Oospira sykesi (Bavay & Dautzenberg, 1899)
- Oospira tetraptyx H.Nordsieck, 2003
- Oospira thausta (Loosjes, 1953)
- Oospira triptyx H.Nordsieck, 2011
- Oospira truncatula Hunyadi & Szekeres, 2016
- Oospira umbratica (Szekeres, 1970)
- Oospira vanbuensis (Bavay & Dautzenberg, 1899)
- Oospira vespa (Gould, 1856)
- Oospira wuellerstorffi (Zelebor, 1867)
- Oospira yanghaoi Grego & Szekeres, 2017
- Oospira zhaoyifani Grego & Szekeres, 2008

== Synonyms ==
- Oospira antilopina (Heude, 1885): synonym of Formosana antilopina (Heude, 1885) (unaccepted combination)
- Oospira assaluensis (Blanford, 1872): synonym of Oospira (Oospira) asaluensis (W. T. Blanford, 1872) represented as Oospira asaluensis (W. T. Blanford, 1872) (incorrect subsequent spelling)
- Oospira corticina (L. Pfeiffer, 1842): synonym of Phaedusa (Phaedusa) corticina (L. Pfeiffer, 1842) represented as Phaedusa corticina (L. Pfeiffer, 1842) (unaccepted combination)
- Oospira cuongi (Maasen & Gittenberger, 2007): synonym of Oospira eregia cuongi (Maassen & Gittenberger, 2007)
- Oospira cuongi (Maassen & Gittenberger, 2007): synonym of Oospira eregia cuongi (Maassen & Gittenberger, 2007)
- Oospira elegans H. Nordsieck, 2012: synonym of Formosana elegans (H. Nordsieck, 2012) (original combination)
- Oospira formosensis (H. Adams, 1866): synonym of Formosana formosensis (H. Adams, 1866) (unaccepted combination)
- Oospira franzhuberi Szekeres & Thach, 2018: synonym of Oospira bolovenica (Möllendorff, 1898) (junior synonym)
- Oospira gregoi Szekeres & Thach, 2017: synonym of Messageriella gregoi (Szekeres & Thach, 2017) (original combination)
- Oospira huberi Thach, 2016: synonym of Castanophaedusa huberi (Thach, 2016) (original combination)
- Oospira liujinae Maassen, 2008: synonym of Formosana libonensis liujinae (Maassen, 2008) (original combination)
- Oospira pacifica (Gredler, 1884): synonym of Formosana pacifica (Gredler, 1884) (unaccepted combination)
- Oospira seguiniana (Heude, 1885): synonym of Formosana seguiniana (Heude, 1885) (unaccepted combination)
- Oospira splendens H. Nordsieck, 2005: synonym of Formosana splendens (H. Nordsieck, 2005) (unaccepted combination)
- Oospira swinhoei (L. Pfeiffer, 1866): synonym of Formosana swinhoei (L. Pfeiffer, 1866) (unaccepted combination)
