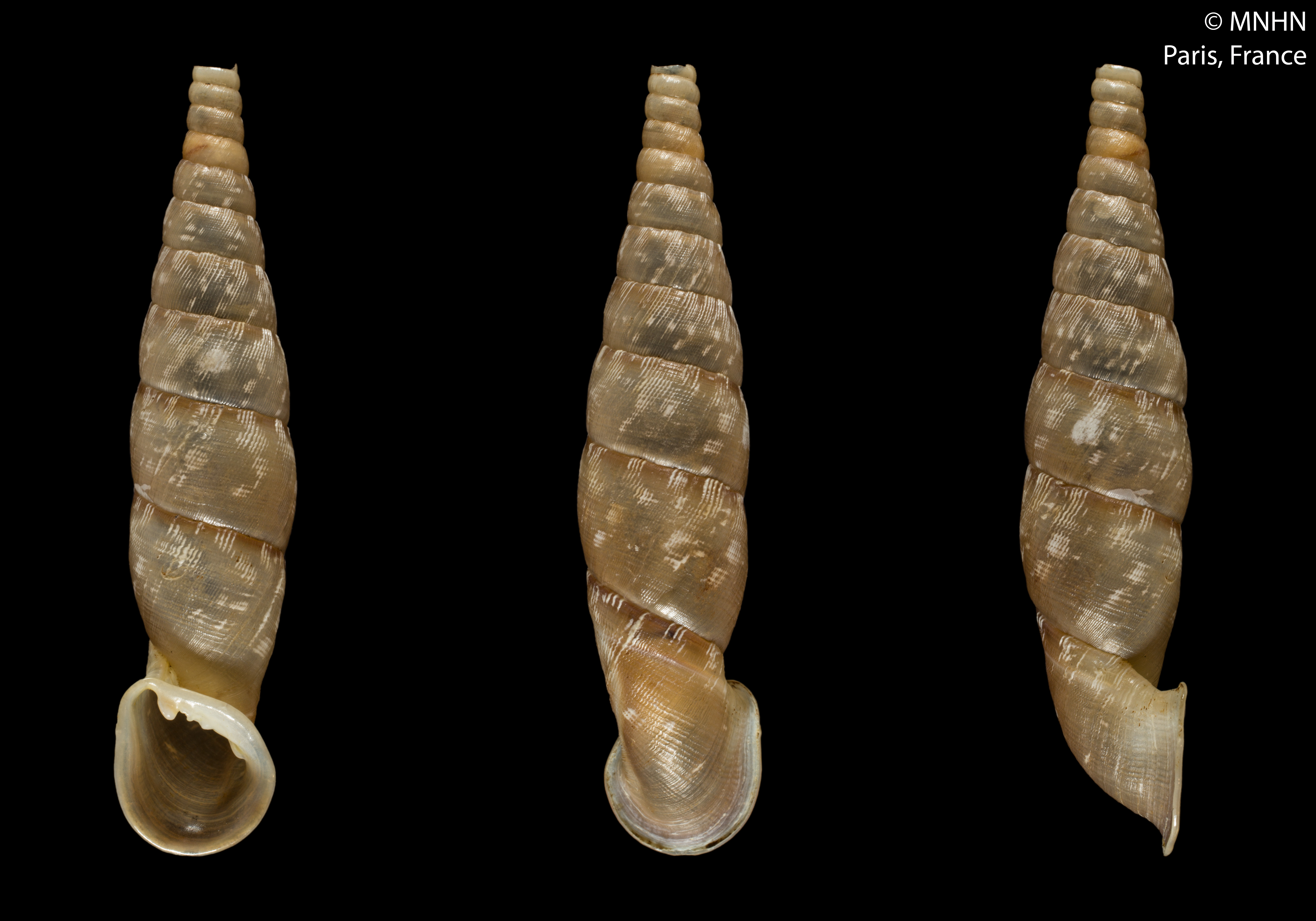
- Shell of Garnieria mouhoti (specimen at MNHN, Paris)

Scientific classification
- Kingdom: Animalia
- Phylum: Mollusca
- Class: Gastropoda
- Order: Stylommatophora
- Infraorder: Clausilioidei
- Superfamily: Clausilioidea
- Family: Clausiliidae
- Genus: Garnieria; Bourguignat, 1877

Type species
- Clausilia mouhoti L. Pfeiffer, 1863

Synonyms
- Clausilia (Garnieria) Bourguignat, 1877; Garnieria (Doducsangia) Páll-Gergely & Szekeres, 2017· accepted, alternate representation; Garnieria (Garnieria) Bourguignat, 1877· accepted, alternate representation; Garnieria (Progarnieria) H. Nordsieck, 2012· accepted, alternate representation; Progarnieria H. Nordsieck, 2012

= Garnieria (gastropod) =

Genus of gastropods

Garnieria is a genus of air-breathing land snails, terrestrial pulmonate gastropod mollusks in the tribe Garnieriini of the subfamily Garnieriinae in the family Clausiliidae, the door snails.

== Species ==
- Garnieria huleschhelii Grego & Szekeres, 2011
- Garnieria mouhoti (L. Pfeiffer, 1863)
- Garnieria nhuongi Do, 2015
- Garnieria saurini H. Nordsieck, 2002
