= Sprattia =

Scientific classification
- Kingdom: Animalia
- Phylum: Mollusca
- Class: Gastropoda
- Order: Stylommatophora
- Family: Clausiliidae
- Genus: Sprattia; Boettger, 1883

Type species
- Clausilia sowerbyana Pfeiffer, 1850

Genus of gastropods

Sprattia is a genus of air-breathing land snail with a clausilium, a terrestrial pulmonate gastropod mollusk in the family Clausiliidae, the door snails.

== Species ==
- Sprattia aksoylari Yildirim, 1997
- Sprattia aksuensis Nordsieck, 2004
- Sprattia beycola Nordsieck, 1994
- Sprattia bicarinata (Rossmässler, 1839)
- Sprattia blissi (Boettger, 1899)
- Sprattia pseudophrygica Nordsieck, 2004
- Sprattia sillyonensis Nordsieck, 1994
- Sprattia sowerbyana (Pfeiffer, 1850)
