= Tropidauchenia =

Scientific classification
- Kingdom: Animalia
- Phylum: Mollusca
- Class: Gastropoda
- Order: Stylommatophora
- Infraorder: Clausilioidei
- Superfamily: Clausilioidea
- Family: Clausiliidae
- Genus: Tropidauchenia; Lindholm, 1924

Type species
- Clausilia bavayi Lindholm, 1924

Synonyms
- Garnieria (Tropidauchenia) Lindholm, 1924 (original rank); Symptychia Ehrmann, 1927; Tropidauchenia (Tropidauchenia) Lindholm, 1924 · alternate representation

Genus of gastropods

Tropidauchenia is a genus of air-breathing land snails, terrestrial pulmonate gastropod mollusks in the tribe Tropidauchenia of the subfamily Garnieriinae in the family Clausiliidae, the door snails.

== Species ==
- Tropidauchenia bavayi (Lindholm, 1924)
- Tropidauchenia danjuan L. Qiu, 2021
- Tropidauchenia donggiaensis H. Nordsieck, 2002
- Tropidauchenia dorri (Bavay & Dautzenberg, 1899)
- Tropidauchenia fischeri H. Nordsieck, 2002
- Tropidauchenia giardi (H. Fischer, 1898)
- Tropidauchenia hitomiae H. Nordsieck, 2007
- Tropidauchenia lucida H. Nordsieck, 2007
- Tropidauchenia mengyuanensis Y.-X. Chen, 2016
- Tropidauchenia messageri (Bavay & Dautzenberg, 1899)
- Tropidauchenia nakaharai H. Nordsieck, 2007
- Tropidauchenia napoensis H. Nordsieck, 2007
- Tropidauchenia ootanii H. Nordsieck, 2007
- Tropidauchenia orientalis (Mabille, 1887)
- Tropidauchenia palatalis H. Nordsieck, 2011
- Tropidauchenia parasulcicollis L. Qiu, 2021
- Tropidauchenia proctostoma (Mabille, 1889)
- Tropidauchenia sulcicollis Grego & Szekeres, 2017
- Tropidauchenia yanghaoi Grego & Szekeres, 2017

Synonyms

- Tropidauchenia (Neniauchenia) amoena H. Nordsieck, 2002: synonym of Grandinenia amoena (H. Nordsieck, 2002)
