= Sciocochlea =

Scientific classification
- Domain: Eukaryota
- Kingdom: Animalia
- Phylum: Mollusca
- Class: Gastropoda
- Order: Stylommatophora
- Family: Clausiliidae
- Genus: Sciocochlea; Boettger, 1935

Genus of land snails

Sciocochlea is a genus of gastropods belonging to the family Clausiliidae.

The species of this genus are found in Greece.

Species:

- Sciocochlea collasi (Sturany, 1904)
- Sciocochlea cryptica Subai & Szekeres, 1999
- Sciocochlea llogaraensis A.Reischütz & P.L.Reischütz, 2009
- Sciocochlea nordsiecki Subai, 1993
