= Dobatia =

Scientific classification
- Kingdom: Animalia
- Phylum: Mollusca
- Class: Gastropoda
- Order: Stylommatophora
- Family: Clausiliidae
- Genus: Dobatia (Brandt, 1961)
- Species: D. goettingi

Binomial name
- Dobatia goettingi Nordsieck, 1973

Genus of land snails

Dobatia is a monotypic genus of gastropods belonging to the family Clausiliidae. The only species is Dobatia goettingi. The genus was named after German naturalist Johann Christian Döbat, while the species received its name from Dutch zoologist Hermann Schlegel in 1853.

The species is found in Japan.
