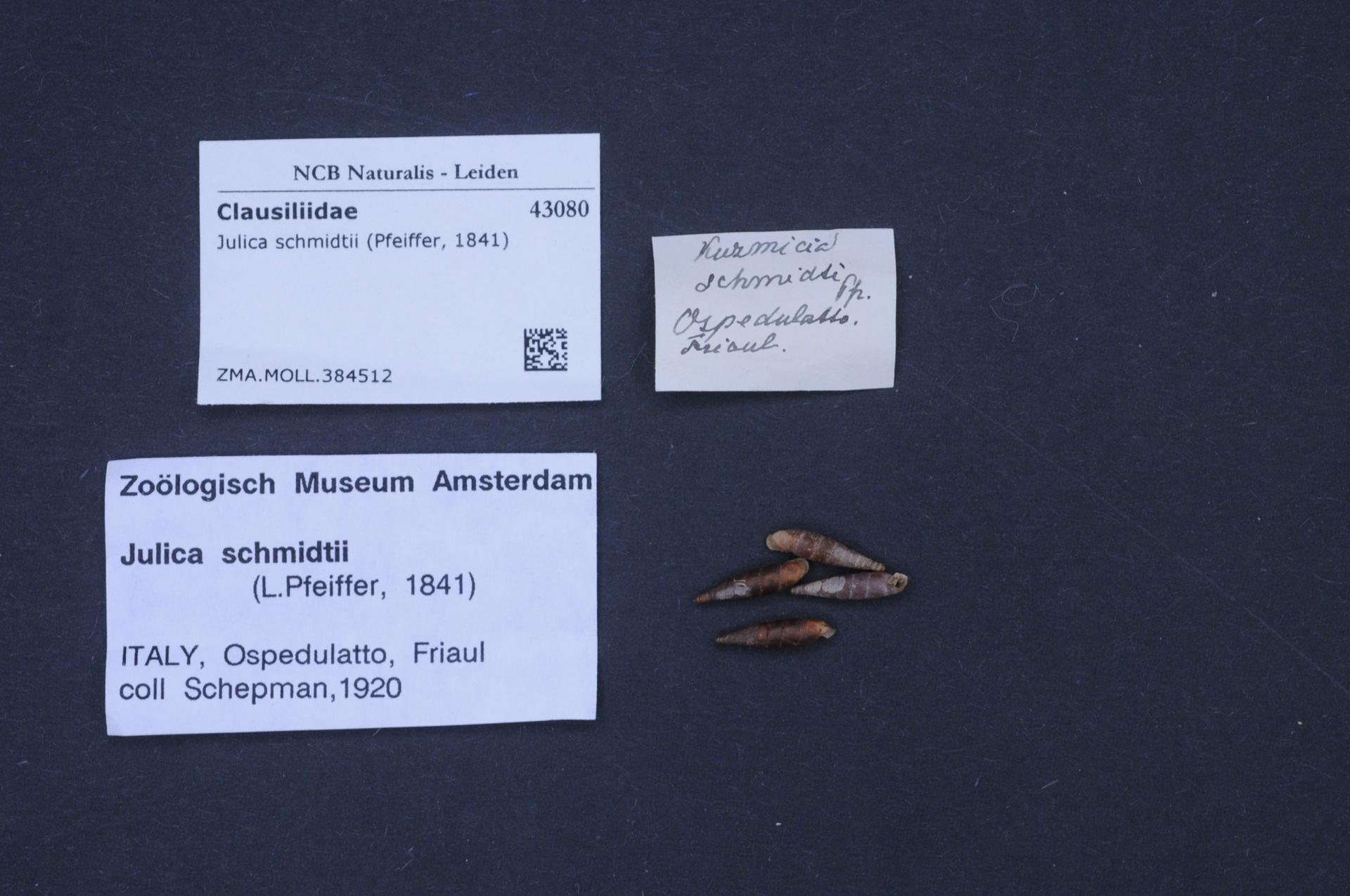

Scientific classification
- Kingdom: Animalia
- Phylum: Mollusca
- Class: Gastropoda
- Order: Stylommatophora
- Family: Clausiliidae
- Genus: Julica; Nordsieck, 1963
- Species: J. schmidtii

Binomial name
- Julica schmidtii (Pfeiffer, 1841)

= Julica =

Genus of land snails

Julica is a monotypic genus of gastropods belonging to the family Clausiliidae. The only species is Julica schmidtii.

The species is found near the Alps.
