= Euxinastra (Odonteuxina) =

Scientific classification
- Kingdom: Animalia
- Phylum: Mollusca
- Class: Gastropoda
- Order: Stylommatophora
- Family: Clausiliidae
- Genus: Euxinastra
- Subgenus: Odonteuxina; H. Nordsieck, 1975

Synonyms
- Odonteuxina H. Nordsieck, 1975

Subgenus of gastropods

Odonteuxina is a subgenus of air-breathing land snails with a clausilium, terrestrial gastropod molluscs in the family Clausiliidae. This subgenus is in the genus Euxinastra.

== Species ==
- Euxinastra harchbelica Páll-Gergely, 2010
- Euxinastra iberica (Roth, 1850)
