= Euxina =

Scientific classification
- Domain: Eukaryota
- Kingdom: Animalia
- Phylum: Mollusca
- Class: Gastropoda
- Order: Stylommatophora
- Family: Clausiliidae
- Genus: Euxina; Boettger, 1877

Genus of molluscs

Euxina is a genus of gastropods belonging to the family Clausiliidae.

The species of this genus are found in Mediterranean, near Black Sea, near Caspian Sea.

Species:

- Euxina achrafensis H.Nordsieck, 1995
- Euxina circumdata (L.Pfeiffer, 1848)
- Euxina forcarti H.Nordsieck, 1995
- Euxina gastron H.Nordsieck, 1995
- Euxina hetaera (L.Pfeiffer, 1848)
- Euxina lessonae (Issel, 1865)
- Euxina mazanderanica H.Nordsieck, 1994
- Euxina patrisnemethi Németh & Szekeres, 2004
- Euxina persica (O.Boettger, 1879)
- Euxina promta (A.Schmidt, 1868)
- Euxina promta (A.Schmidt, 1868)
- Euxina talyschana Likharev, 1962
