= Phrygica =

Scientific classification
- Kingdom: Animalia
- Phylum: Mollusca
- Class: Gastropoda
- Order: Stylommatophora
- Family: Clausiliidae
- Genus: Phrygica; Nordsieck, 1994

Genus of molluscs

Phrygica is a genus of gastropods belonging to the family Clausiliidae.

The species of this genus are found in Turkey.

Species:

- Phrygica euxinaeformis H.Nordsieck, 1994
- Phrygica ilegiensis H.Nordsieck, 2004
- Phrygica jansseni H.Nordsieck, 1994
- Phrygica jelskii H.Nordsieck, 1994
- Phrygica raehlei H.Nordsieck, 1994
- Phrygica riedeli H.Nordsieck, 1994
