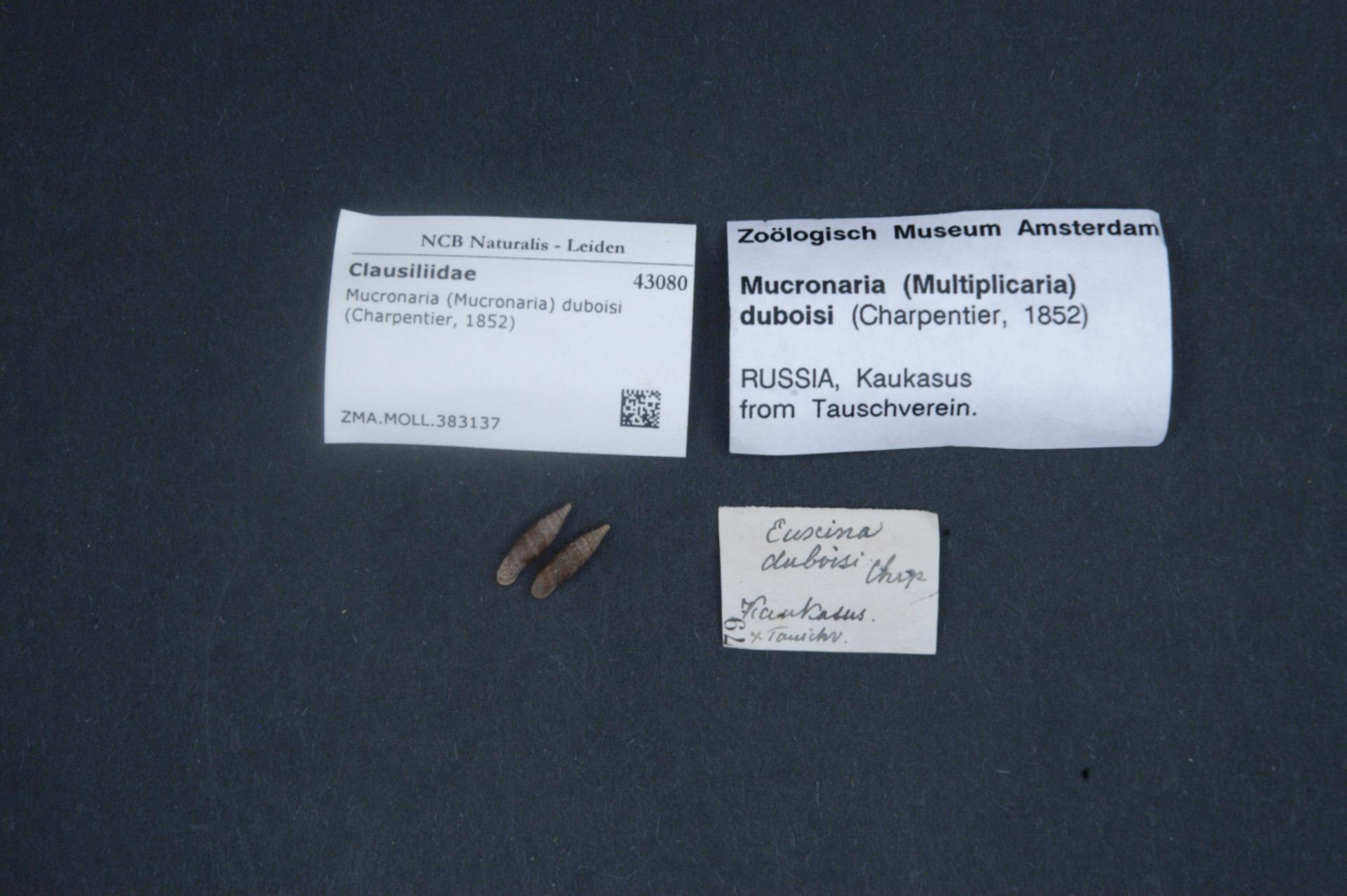
- Mucronaria duboisi

Scientific classification
- Domain: Eukaryota
- Kingdom: Animalia
- Phylum: Mollusca
- Class: Gastropoda
- Order: Stylommatophora
- Family: Clausiliidae
- Genus: Mucronaria; Boettger, 1877

= Mucronaria =

Genus of land snails

Mucronaria is a genus of gastropods belonging to the family Clausiliidae.

The species of this genus are found in Central Europe and Western Asia.

Species:

- Mucronaria acuminata (Mousson, 1876)
- Mucronaria duboisi (De Charpentier, 1852)
- Mucronaria index (Mousson, 1863)
- Mucronaria pleuroptychia (O.Boettger, 1878)
- Mucronaria strauchi (O.Boettger, 1878)
