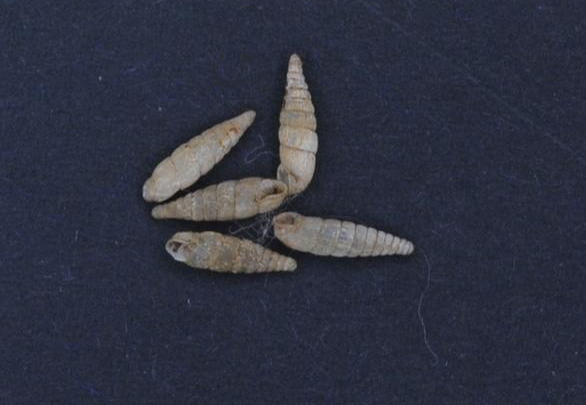
- Fusulus interruptus

Scientific classification
- Domain: Eukaryota
- Kingdom: Animalia
- Phylum: Mollusca
- Class: Gastropoda
- Order: Stylommatophora
- Family: Clausiliidae
- Genus: Fusulus; Fitzinger, 1833

= Fusulus =

Genus of snails

Fusulus is a genus of gastropods belonging to the family Clausiliidae. It has one accepted species, Fusulus interruptus, found in Central Europe.
