= Columbinia =

Scientific classification
- Kingdom: Animalia
- Phylum: Mollusca
- Class: Gastropoda
- Order: Stylommatophora
- Family: Clausiliidae
- Genus: Columbinia; Polinski, 1924

Subgenera
- Columbinia Polinski, 1924; Paranenia Rehder, 1939; Steatonenia Pilsbry, 1926

Genus of gastropods

Columbinia is a left-handed, air-breathing land snails genus in the family Clausiliidae.

== Species ==
Species within the genus Columbinia include:

subgenus Columbinia Polinski, 1924

- Columbinia columbiana (Polinski, 1924) - type species
- Columbinia elegans Nordsieck, 2010
- Columbinia elegantula Nordsieck, 2010
- Columbinia marcapatensis Nordsieck, 2010

subgenus Paranenia Rehder, 1939

- ...

subgenus Steatonenia Pilsbry, 1926

- Columbinia hemmeni Nordsieck, 2010
