= Euxinella (gastropod) =

Scientific classification
- Kingdom: Animalia
- Phylum: Mollusca
- Class: Gastropoda
- Order: Stylommatophora
- Family: Clausiliidae
- Genus: Euxinella; Nordsieck, 1973

Genus of land snails

Euxinella is a genus of gastropods belonging to the family Clausiliidae.

The species of this genus are found in Greece.

Species:

- Euxinella alpinella Dedov, 2012
- Euxinella radikae H.Nordsieck, 1973
- Euxinella subaii Dedov & Neubert, 2009
