= Andinia (gastropod) =

Scientific classification
- Domain: Eukaryota
- Kingdom: Animalia
- Phylum: Mollusca
- Class: Gastropoda
- Order: Stylommatophora
- Family: Clausiliidae
- Genus: Andinia; Poliński, 1922

Genus of molluscs

Andinia is a genus of mollusks belonging to the family Clausiliidae.

The species of this genus are found in Southern America.

Species:

- Andinia taczanowskii (Lubomirski, 1879)
