= Triloba =

Scientific classification
- Domain: Eukaryota
- Kingdom: Animalia
- Phylum: Mollusca
- Class: Gastropoda
- Order: Stylommatophora
- Family: Clausiliidae
- Genus: Triloba; Vest, 1867

Genus of gastropods

Triloba is a genus of gastropods belonging to the family Clausiliidae.

The species of this genus are found in the Balkans.

Species:

- Triloba sandrii (Küster, 1844)
- Triloba talevi Dedov & Neubert, 2002
- Triloba thaumasia (Sturany, 1907)
