= Serrulina =

Scientific classification
- Kingdom: Animalia
- Phylum: Mollusca
- Class: Gastropoda
- Order: Stylommatophora
- Family: Clausiliidae
- Genus: Serrulina; Mousson, 1873

Genus of gastropods

Serrulina is a genus of air breathing land snails, terrestrial pulmonate gastropod mollusks in the family Clausiliidae, the door snails, all of which have a clausilium.

== Species and subspecies ==
Species and subspecies in the genus Serrulina include:

- Serrulina serrulata (L. Pfeiffer 1847)
  - Serrulina serrulata serrulata (L. Pfeiffer 1847)
  - Serrulina serrulata amanica (Naegele 1906)
- Serrulina sieversi (L. Pfeiffer 1871)
  - Serrulina sieversi sieversi (L. Pfeiffer 1871)
  - Serrulina sieversi occidentalis Likharev 1962
