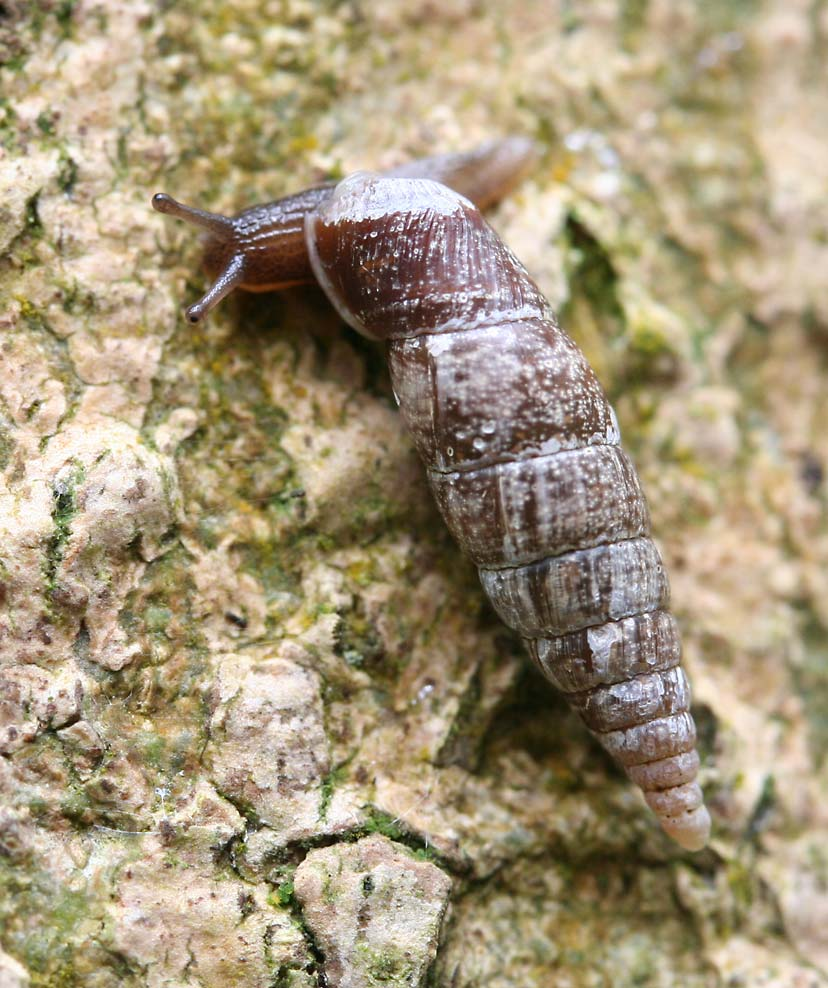
- Cochlodina laminata

Scientific classification
- Kingdom: Animalia
- Phylum: Mollusca
- Class: Gastropoda
- Order: Stylommatophora
- Suborder: Helicina
- Infraorder: Clausilioidei
- Superfamily: Clausilioidea
- Family: Clausiliidae; J. E. Gray, 1855

Type genus
- Clausilia Draparnaud, 1805

= Clausiliidae =

Family of gastropods

Clausiliidae, also known by the common name door snails, is a taxonomic family of small, very elongate, mostly left-handed, air-breathing land snails, sinistral terrestrial pulmonate gastropod mollusks.

With over 1700 recognized recent and fossil species, this is among the most diverse families of terrestrial gastropods (cf. Orthalicidae), although the marine gastropod family Pyramidellidae is larger.

Most species of Clausiliidae have an anatomical structure known as a clausilium, which enables the snail to close off the aperture of the shell with a sliding "door".

== Shell description ==
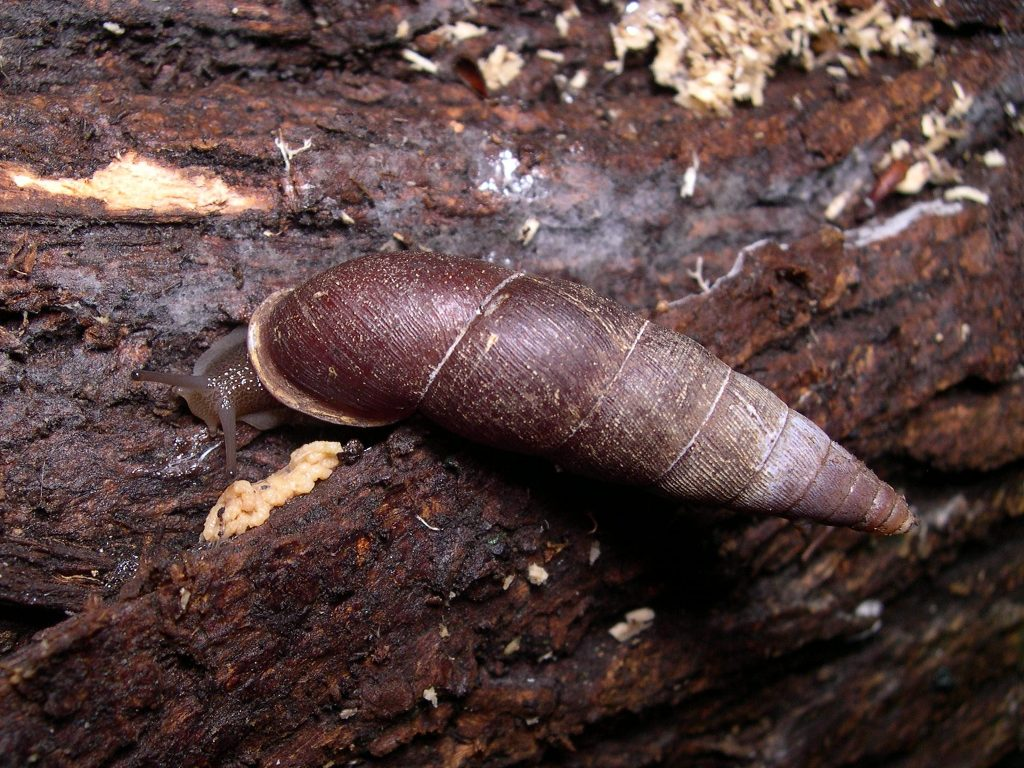
Megalophaedusa martensi is the largest species of the family Clausiliidae in the world. The individual in the photograph has a shell which is 45.5 mm long. The whole snail weighs 3.2 g live.

Almost all the species of snails in the family of door snails are sinistral (left-handed), which is an uncommon feature in gastropod shells in general.

These snails have shells which are extremely high-spired, with numerous whorls.

The shells tend to be club-shaped, tapering at both ends to a rounded nub. The aperture usually has visible folds.

=== The clausilium ===
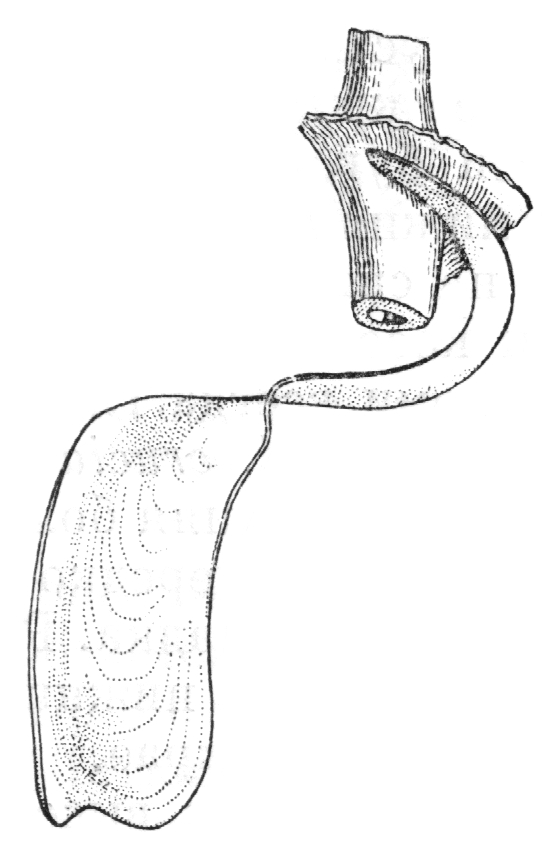
The clausilium of Clausilia dubia

Clausiliids are also very unusual among pulmonate gastropods in that most of them have a "door" or clausilium. The clausilium is not the same thing as an operculum, which does not exist at all in most pulmonate gastropods.

The clausilium is a calcareous structure, tongue-shaped or spoon-shaped, which can close the aperture of the snail shell to protect the soft parts against predation by animals such as carnivorous beetle larvae. The narrow end of the clausilium slides in the grooves that are formed by the folds on the inside of the shell.

== Anatomy ==
In this family, the number of haploid chromosomes lies between 21 and 30 (according to the values in this table).

== Taxonomy ==
The type genus is Clausilia Draparnaud, 1805.

The family Clausiliidae is classified within the informal group Sigmurethra, itself belonging to the clade Stylommatophora within the clade Eupulmonata (according to the taxonomy of the Gastropoda by Bouchet & Rocroi, 2005).

=== 2005 taxonomy ===
The taxonomy of the Gastropoda by Bouchet & Rocroi, 2005 recognizes subfamilies as follows:

subfamily Clausiliinae Gray, 1855

- tribe Baleini (previously the subfamily Baleinae A. J. Wagner, 1913) – synonyms: Laciniariini H. Nordsieck, 1963; Tristaniinae Schileyko, 1999
- tribe Clausiliini Gray, 1855 – synonym: Fusulinae Lindholm, 1924
- tribe Gracillariini H. Nordsieck, 1979

subfamily Alopiinae A. J. Wagner, 1913

- tribe Alopiini A. J. Wagner, 1913
- tribe Cochlodinini Lindholm, 1925 (1923) – synonym: Marpessinae Wenz, 1923
- tribe Delimini Brandt, 1956 – synonym: Papilliferini Brandt, 1961 (n.a.)
- tribe Medorini H. Nordsieck, 1997
- tribe Montenegrinini H. Nordsieck, 1972

subfamily † Constrictinae H. Nordsieck, 1981

subfamily Garnieriinae C. Boettger, 1926

- tribe Garnieriini C. Boettger, 1926
- tribe Tropidaucheniini H. Nordsieck, 2002

subfamily † Eualopiinae H. Nordsieck, 1978

- tribe † Eualopiini H. Nordsieck, 1978
- tribe † Rillyini H. Nordsieck, 1985

subfamily Laminiferinae Wenz, 1923

subfamily Mentissoideinae Lindholm, 1924

- tribe Mentissoideini Lindholm, 1924 – synonym: Euxininae I. M. Likharev, 1962
- tribe Acrotomini H. Nordsieck, 1979
- tribe Boettgeriini H. Nordsieck, 1979
- tribe Euxinellini Neubert, 2002
- tribe Filosini H. Nordsieck, 1979
- tribe Olympicolini Neubert, 2002
- tribe Strigileuxinini H. Nordsieck, 1994
- tribe Strumosini H. Nordsieck, 1994

subfamily Neniinae Wenz, 1923 – Neniastrinae H. B. Baker, 1930

subfamily Phaedusinae A. J. Wagner, 1922

- † tribe Disjunctariini H. Nordsieck, 2014
- tribe Megalophaedusini Zilch, 1954 – synonym: Zaptyxini Zilch, 1954
- † tribe Nordsieckiini H. Nordsieck, 2007
- tribe Phaedusini A. J. Wagner, 1922
- † tribe Serrulellini H. Nordsieck, 2007
- tribe Serrulinini Ehrmann, 1927
- tribe Synprosphymini H. Nordsieck, 2007

subfamily Serrulininae Ehrmann, 1927

== Genera ==
Genera include:

=== Clausiliinae ===
Tribe Acrotomini H. Nordsieck, 1979

- Acrotoma O. Boettger, 1881 – with four subgenera: Acrotoma, Acrotomina H. Nordsieck, 1977; Bzybia H. Nordsieck, 1977 and Castelliana Suvorov, 2002
- Akramowskia H. Nordsieck, 1975
- Armenica O. Boettger, 1877 – with two subgenera: Armenica and Astrogena Szekeres, 1970
- Inobseratella Lindholm, 1924
- Phrygica H. Nordsieck, 1994
- Roseniella Thiele, 1931 – with two subgenera: Chavchetia Neubert, 1992 and Roseniella
- Scrobifera O. Boettger, 1877
- Sprattia O. Boettger, 1883

tribe Baleini

- Alinda H. & A. Adams, 1855 – with two subgenera: Alinda and Pseudalinda O. Boettger, 1877
- Balea J. E. Gray, 1824
- Bulgarica O. Boettger, 1877 – with three subgenera Bulgarica, Pavlovicia H. Nordsieck, 1973 and Strigilecula Kennard & Woodward, 1923
- Lacinaria Hartmann, 1842
- Likharevia H. Nordsieck, 1975
- Mentissa H. & A.Adams, 1855
- Mentissella H. Nordsieck, 1973
- Micropontica O. Boettger, 1881 – with two subgenera: Baleopsina Lindholm, 1924 and Micropontica
- Mucronaria O. Boettger, 1877 – with two subgenera: Index O. Boettger, 1877 and Mucronaria
- Quadriplicata O. Boettger, 1878
- Strigillaria Vest, 1867
- Vestia Hesse, 1916 – with three subgenera: Brabenecia H. Nordsieck, 1974; Vestia and Vestiella H. Nordsieck, 1877

Tribe Boettgeriini H. Nordsieck, 1979

- Boettgeria O. Boettger, 1863 – with two subgenera: Boettgeriaand Loosjesiella Neubert & Groh, 1998
- Macroptychia O. Boettger, 1877
- Sabaeola Lindholm, 1925

tribe Clausiliini

- † Canalicia O. Boettger, 1863
- Clausilia Draparnaud, 1805 – with two subgenera: Clausilia and Strobeliella H. Nordsieck, 1977
- Erjavecia Brusina, 1870
- Erjaveciella H. Nordsieck, 1977
- Fusulus Fitzinger, 1833 – with two subgenera: Erjaveciella H. Nordsieck, 1877 and Fusulus
- † Hollabrunnella H. Nordsieck, 2007
- Julica H. Nordsieck, 1963
- Macrogastra Hartmann, 1841 – with three subgenera: Macrogastra, Pseudovestia H. Nordsieck, 1877 and Pyrostoma Vest, 1867
- Micridyla H. Nordsieck, 1973
- † Parafusulus H. Nordsieck, 2007
- † Pliodiptychia H. Nordsieck, 1978
- Pseudidyla O. Boettger, 1877
- Pseudofusulus H. Nordsieck, 1977 – has the only one species: Pseudofusulus varians
- Ruthenica Lindholm, 1924
- † Trolliella H. Nordsieck, 1981

Tribe † Emarginariini H. Nordsieck, 2007

- † Emarginaria O. Boettger, 1877

Tribe Euxinellini Neubert, 2002

- Euxinella H. Nordsieck, 1973

Tribe Filosini H. Nordsieck, 1979

- Filosa O. Boettger, 1877
- Idyla H. & A. Adams, 1855 – with two subgenera: Idyla and Strigilidyla H. Nordsieck, 1994

tribe Gracillariini H. Nordsieck, 1979

- Graciliaria Bielz, 1867
- † Truciella H. Nordsieck, 1978

Tribe Mentissoideini Lindholm, 1924

- Elia H. & A.Adams, 1855 – with four subgenera: Acroeuxina O. Boettger, 1877; Caucasica O. Boettger, 1877; Elia and Megaleuxina O. Boettger, 1877
- Euxina O. Boettger, 1877 – with two subgenera: Euxina and Illunellaria Lindholm, 1924
- Euxinastra O. Boettger, 1888 – with two subgenera: Euxinastra and Odonteuxina H. Nordsieck, 1875
- Galeata O. Boettger, 1877
- Mentissoidea O. Boettger, 1877

Tribe Olympicolini Neubert, 2002

- Olympicola Hesse, 1916
- † Scrobiferoides Neubert, 1996

Tribe Strigileuxinini H. Nordsieck, 1994

- Bitorquata O. Boettger, 1877
- Blaeneuxina Páll-Gergely & Szekeres, 2020
- Strigileuxina H. Nordsieck, 1975
- Sumelia H. Nordsieck, 1994

Tribe Strumosini H. Nordsieck, 1994

- Strumosa O. Boettger, 1877

=== Alopiinae A. J. Wagner, 1913 ===
Alopiinae

- † Dextrospira Hrubesch, 1965

tribe Alopiini

- Alopia H. & A.Adams, 1855 – with two subgenera Alopia and Kimakowiczia Szekeres, 1969
- Herilla H. & A. Adams, 1855
- Montenegrina O. Boettger, 1877
- Protoherilla A. J. Wagner, 1921
- † Protriloba H. Nordsieck, 2014
- Triloba Vest, 1867

tribe Cochlodinini Lindholm, 1925 (1923)

- Cochlodina A. Férussac, 1821 – with four subgenera: Cochlodina; Cochlodinastra H. Nordsieck, 1977; Paracochlodina H. Nordsieck, 1969; Procochlodina H. Nordsieck, 1969
- Macedonica O. Boettger, 1877

tribe Delimini R. Brandt, 1956

- Barcania Brandt, 1956
- Charpentieria Stabille, 1864 – with subgenera: Charpentieria
- Delima Hartmann, 1842 – with four subgenera: Delima; Dugiana Stamol & Slapnik, 2002; Piceata O. Boettger, 1877 and Semirugata O. Boettger, 1877
- Dilataria Vest, 1867
- Gibbularia Cecconi, 1908
- Mauritanica O. Boettger, 1879
- Papillifera Hartmann, 1842
- Sicania Tomlin, 1929
- Stigmatica O. Boettger, 1877

tribe Medorini H. Nordsieck, 1997

- Agathylla H. & A.Adams, 1855 – with two subgenera Agathylla and Agathyllina H. Nordsieck, 1969
- Albinaria Vest, 1867 – also includes former genusSericata O. Boettger, 1878.
- Carinigera Möllendorff, 1873
- Cristataria Vest, 1867
- Inchoatia Gittenberger & Uit de Weerd, 2006
- Isabellaria Vest, 1867
- Lampedusa O. Boettger, 1877 – with two subgenera Imitatrix Westerlund, 1884 and Lampedusa
- Leucostigma A. J. Wagner, 1919
- Medora H. & A. Adams, 1855
- Muticaria Lindholm, 1925
- Strigilodelima A. J. Wagner, 1924
- Vallatia E. Gittenberger & Uit de Weerd, 2006

=== Constrictinae ===
Fossil subfamily Constrictinae contains genera:

- † Constricta O. Boettger, 1877 – type genus of the subfamily
- † Regiclausilia H. Nordsieck, 1981

=== Eualopiinae ===
Fossil subfamily Eualopiinae contains genera:

- † Ambiguella H. Nordsieck, 2007
- Formosana O. Boettger, 1877

Tribe † Eualopiini H. Nordsieck, 1978

- † Eualopia O. Boettger, 1877 – type genus of the subfamily
- † Monoptychia H. Nordsieck, 1972

Tribe † Rillyini † H. Nordsieck, 1985

- † Neniopsilla H. Nordsieck, 2020
- † Neniopsis Wenz, 1920
- † Omanillya H. Nordsieck in Harzhauser et al., 2016
- † Pararillya H. Nordsieck, 2002
- † Proalbinaria O. Boettger in Oppenheim, 189
- † Rillya Munier-Chalmas [in P. Fischer], 1883 – type genus of the tribe
- † Neniopsilla H. Nordsieck, 2020
- † Neniopsis Wenz, 1920
- † Omanillya H. Nordsieck in Harzhauser et al., 2016
- † Pararillya H. Nordsieck, 2002
- † Proalbinaria O. Boettger in Oppenheim, 1895

=== Garnieriinae ===
- tribe Garnieriini C. Boettger, 1926
- Garnieria Bourguignat, 1877
- tribe Tropidaucheniini H. Nordsieck, 2002
- Euryauchenia H. Nordsieck, 2007
- Grandinenia Minato & Chen, 1984
- Indonenia Ehrmann, 1927
- Megalauchenia H. Nordsieck, 2007
- Tropidauchenia Lindholm, 1924 -

=== Laminiferinae ===
- Bofilliella Ehrmann, 1927
- Neniatlanta Bouguignat, 1876
- Margaritiphaedusa H. Nordsieck, 2001
- Minatoia Hunyadi & Szekeres, 2016

Tribe Laminiferini Wenz, 1923

- † Baboria Cossmann, 1898
- † Laminifera O. Boettger, 1863 – the type genus of the family Laminiferinae. Its type species is fossil.
- † Laminiplica H. Nordsieck, 1978
- † Omanifera H. Nordsieck in Harzhauser et al., 2016

Tribe † Oospiroidesini H. Nordsieck, 2007

- † Oospiroides Wenz, 1920

Tribe † Polloneriini H. Nordsieck, 2007

- † Polloneria Sacco, 1886

=== Mentissoideinae ===
synonym of the tribe Mentissoideini Lindholm, 1924 (superseded classification)

=== Neniinae Wenz, 1923 ===
Tribe Neniini Wenz, 1923

- Gonionenia Pilsbry, 1926
- Nenia H. & A. Adams, 1855
- Neniops Pilsbry, 1926
- Paranenia Rehder, 1939

=== Peruiniinae H. Nordsieck, 2005 ===
- Andinia Polinski, 1922
- Audiniastra H. Nordsieck, 2005
- Andiniella Weyrauch, 1958
- Bequaertinenia Weyrauch, 1964 – with two subgenera: Bequaertinenia and Miranenia Grego & Szekeres, 2004
- Brevinenia Neubert & H. Nordsieck, 2005
- Columbinia Polinski, 1924 – with subgenera: Columbinia and Steatonenia Pilsbry, 1926
- Cyclonenia H. Nordsieck, 1999
- Cylindronenia Ehrmann in Pilsbry, 1949 – with two subgenera: Cylindronenia and Cylindroneniella H. Nordsieck, 2007
- Ehrmanniella Zilch, 1949
- Gracilinenia Polinski, 1922
- Hemicena Pilsbry, 1949
- Incaglaia Pilsbry, 1949 – with two subgenera: Gibbonenia Zilch, 1954 and Incaglaia
- Incania Polinski, 1922
- Leuconenia H. Nordsieck, 2005
- Neniaptyx H. Nordsieck, 2007
- Neniatracta Pilsbry, 1926
- Neniella Grego & Sekeres, 2004
- Parabalea Ancey, 1882
- Peruinia Polinski, 1922
- Pfeifferiella Weyrauch, 1957
- Pseudogracilinenia Loosjes & Loosjes-van Bemmel, 1984
- Steeriana Jousseaume, 1900
- Symptychiella H. Nordsieck, 1999 – with two subgenera: Divnenia H. Nordsieck, 2005 and Symptychiella
- Temesa H. & A. Adams, 1855
- Zilchiella Weyrauch, 1957

=== Phaedusinae A. J. Wagner, 1922 ===
- Selenophaedusa Lindholm, 1924
- Siciliaria Vest, 1867

Tribe † Disjunctariini H. Nordsieck, 2014

- † Disjunctaria O. Boettger, 1877

Tribe † Nordsieckiini H. Nordsieck, 2007

- † Nordsieckia Truc, 1972
- † Serruluna H. Nordsieck, 1981

tribe Phaedusini A. J. Wagner, 1922

- Acanthophaedusa H. Nordsieck, 2007
- Atractophaedusa Ehrmann, 1927
- Bacillophaedusa Grego & Szekeres, 2011
- Bathyptychia Lindholm, 1925 – with three subgenera: Bathyptychia; Brachyptychia H. Nordsieck, 2001 and Strictiphaedusa H. Nordsieck, 2001
- Castanophaedusa Páll-Gergely & Szekeres, 2017
- Celsiphaedusa H. Nordsieck, 2001
- Changphaedusa Motochin & Ueshima, 2017
- Cylindrophaedusa O. Boettger, 1877 – with three subgenera: Cylindrophaedusa and Montiphaedusa H. Nordsieck, 2002
- Dautzenbergiella Lindholm, 1924 – with two subgenera: Dautzenbergiella and Mansuyiella H. Nordsieck, 2003
- Euphaedusa O. Boettger, 1877 – with subgenera: Dentiphaedusa H. Nordsieck, 2003; Euphaedusa; and Telophaedusa H. Nordsieck, 2003
- Fuchsiana Gredler, 1887
- Hemiphaedusa O. Boettger, 1877 – with subgenera: Dendrophaedusa H. Nordsieck, 2002; Hemiphaedusa; Hemiphaedusoides H. Nordsieck, 2001; Hemizaptyx Pilsbry, 1905; Labyrinthiphaedusa H. Nordsieck, 2001; Pinguiphaedusa Azuma, 1982; Placeophaedusa Minato, 1994)
- Juttingia Loosjes, 1965 – with two subgenera: Juttingia and Pseudohemiphaedusa H. Nordsieck, 2002
- Liparophaedusa Lindholm, 1924
- Loosjesia H. Nordsieck, 2002
- Luchuphaedusa Pilsbry, 1901 – with two subgenera: Luchuphaedusa and Nesiophaedusa Pilsbry, 1905
- Macrophaedusa Moellendorff, 1883
- Macrophaedusella H. Nordsieck, 2001
- Megalophaedusa O. Boettger, 1877 – with four subgenera: Megalophaedusa; Mesophaedusa Ehrmann, 1929; Mesozaptyx Kuroda, 1963 and Mundiphaedusa Minato, 1979. (Neophaedusa is a synonym of Megalophaedusa).
- Messageriella Páll-Gergely & Szekeres, 2017
- Miraphaedusa H. Nordsieck, 2005
- Musaphaedusa H. Nordsieck, 2018
- Nannophaedusa H. Nordsieck, 2012
- Notoptychia Ehrmann, 1927
- Oospira Blanford, 1872 – with subgenera Formosanella H. Nordsieck, 2003; Oospira; Paraformosella H. Nordsieck, 2003 and Siphonophaedusa Lindholm, 1924
- Papilliphaedusa H. Nordsieck, 2003
- Paraphaedusa O. Boettger, 1877
- Phaedusa H. & A.Adams, 1855 – with subgenera: Metaphaedusa H. Nordsieck, 2001; Phaedusa; Pseudophaedusa Tomiyama, 1984
- Probosciphaedusa Z.-Y. Chen, 2021
- Reinia Kobelt, 1876 – with three subgenera: Parareinia H. Nordsieck, 1998; Pictophaedusa Azuma, 1982 and Reinia
- Serriphaedusa H. Nordsieck, 2001
- Sinigena Lindholm, 1925
- Solitariphaedusa Motochin & Ueshima, 2017
- Stereophaedusa O. Boettger, 1877
- Streptodera Lindholm, 1925
- Tauphaedusa H. Nordsieck, 2003
- Tosaphaedusa Ehrmann, 1929
- Zaptyx Pilsbry, 1901 – with two subgenera: Prozaptyx Loosjes, 1950 and Zaptyx

Tribe † Serrulellini H. Nordsieck, 2007

- † Serrulastra H. Nordsieck, 1981
- † Serrulella H. Nordsieck, 1978

Tribe Serrulinini Ehrmann, 1927

- Caspiophaedusa Lindholm, 1924
- Cotyorica Grego & Szekeres, 2017
- Dobatia H. Nordsieck, 1973
- † Euxinophaedusa Likharev, 1962
- Graecophaedusa Rähle, 1982
- Laeviphaedusa Likharev & Stelkov, 1965
- Microphaedusa H. Nordsieck, 1978
- Nothoserrulina Németh & Szekeres, 1995
- Pamphylica Németh & Szekeres, 1995
- Pontophaedusa Lindholm, 1924
- Pontophaedusella H. Nordsieck, 1994
- Pravispira Lindholm, 1924
- Sciocochlea C. Boettger, 1935
- Serrulina Mousson, 1873
- Truncatophaedusa Majoros, Németh & Szili-Kovács 1994
- Tsoukatosia Gittenberger, 2000 – with two subgenera: Agiosspeleikos A. & P. Reischütz, 2003 and Tsoukatosia

Tribe Synprosphymini H. Nordsieck, 2007

- Excussispira Lindholm, 1925
- Synprosphyma A. J. Wagner, 1920

== Synonyms ==
- Diceratoptyx Pilsbry, 1905: synonym of Zaptyx Pilsbry, 1900 (junior synonym)
- Heterozaptyx Pilsbry, 1906: synonym of Zaptyx Pilsbry, 1900 (junior synonym)
- Kazancia Neubert, 1992: synonym of Lindholm, 1924 (junior synonym)
- Leptacme Ehrmann, 1927: synonym of Oospira (Leptocochlea) Grego & Szekeres, 2011 represented as Oospira W. T. Blanford, 1872
- Lindholmiella Ehrmann, 1927: synonym of Oospira (Lindholmiella) Ehrmann, 1927 represented as Oospira W. T. Blanford, 1872
- Metazaptyx Pilsbry, 1905synonym of Zaptyx Pilsbry, 1900
- Neniauchenia H. Nordsieck, 2002: synonym of Grandinenia Minato & D.-N. Chen, 1984
- Neostyriaca A. J. Wagner, 1920: synonym of Clausilia (Neostyriaca) A. J. Wagner, 1920 represented as Clausilia Draparnaud, 1805
- Oligozaptx Pilsbry, 1905: synonym of Zaptyx (Stereozaptyx) Pilsbry, 1905 represented as Zaptyx Pilsbry, 1900
- Parazaptyx Pilsbry, 1905: synonym of Zaptyx (Parazaptyx) Pilsbry, 1905 represented as Zaptyx Pilsbry, 1900
- Pliciphaedusa H. Nordsieck, 1998: synonym of Stereophaedusa (Pliciphaedusa) H. Nordsieck, 1998 represented as Stereophaedusa O. Boettger, 1877
- Pulchraptyx Minato, 1981: synonym of Zaptyx (Pulchraptyx) Minato, 1981 represented as Zaptyx Pilsbry, 1900
- Renschiphaedusa Loosjes & Loosjes-van Bemmel, 1973: synonym of Phaedusa H. Adams & A. Adams, 1855
- Selenoptyx Pilsbry, 1908: synonym of Zaptyx (Selenoptyx) Pilsbry, 1908 represented as Zaptyx Pilsbry, 1900
- Serrulinella H. Nordsieck, 1984: synonym of Serrulina (Serrulinella) H. Nordsieck, 1984 represented as Serrulina Mousson, 1873 (unaccepted rank)
- Stereozaptyx Pilsbry, 1905: synonym of Zaptyx (Stereozaptyx) Pilsbry, 1905 represented as Zaptyx Pilsbry, 1900
- Thaumatoptyx Pilsbry, 1908: synonym of Zaptyx (Thaumatoptyx) Pilsbry, 1908 represented as Zaptyx Pilsbry, 1900
- Tyrannophaedusa Pilsbry, 1901: synonym of Megalophaedusa (Tyrannophaedusa) Pilsbry, 1900 represented as Megalophaedusa O. Boettger, 1877
- Tyrannozaptyx Käufel, 1930: synonym of Zaptyx (Tyrannozaptyx) Käufel, 1930 represented as Zaptyx Pilsbry, 1900
- Zaptychopsis Ehrmann, 1927: synonym of Zaptyx (Zaptychopsis) Ehrmann, 1927 represented as Zaptyx Pilsbry, 1900

== Conservation ==
Although non-marine molluscs appear to be exceptionally vulnerable to extinction, the IUCN Red list listed only 9 species from this family.
