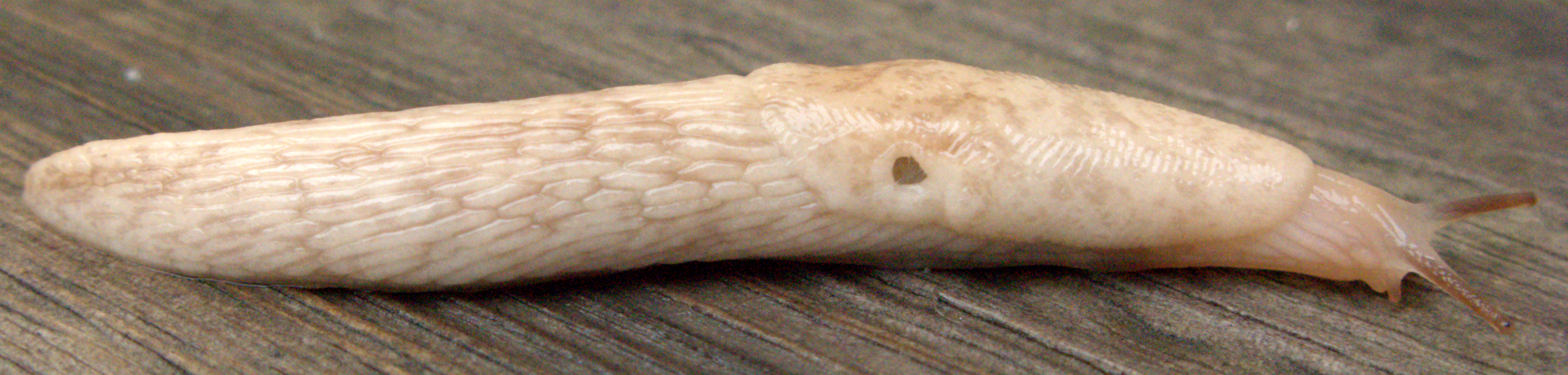

Scientific classification
- Kingdom: Animalia
- Phylum: Mollusca
- Class: Gastropoda
- Order: Stylommatophora
- Family: Agriolimacidae
- Genus: Deroceras
- Species: D. klemmi

Binomial name
- Deroceras klemmi Grossu, 1972

Synonyms
- D. dalmatinum Grossu, 1972; D. lothari auct. non Giusti, 1973 mistaken synonymisation

= Deroceras klemmi =

Species of terrestrial slug

Deroceras klemmi is a species of land slug, a terrestrial pulmonate gastropod mollusc in the family Agriolimacidae. Confusion in how to distinguish it from the closely related Deroceras reticulatum led to widespread records across Italy, France and Germany, but it is now believed to be largely restricted to Slovenia and adjacent regions.

== Taxonomy ==
The prolific Romanian malacologist Alexandru Grossu (1910–2004) described D. klemmi from old museum material. Unfortunately the type specimens are a mixture of species, and Grossu subsequently mixed up the holotype with a paratype. This led Reischütz to draw erroneous conclusions about the identification characters, which led to extensive misidentifications of populations of D. reticulatum as D. klemmi. The mix-up of specimens was corrected without publicity, leading to further confusion.

Another source of confusion was the incorrect synonymisation with Deroceras lothari, a quite different species from the Apennines. First D. lothari was considered the senior synonym and then D. klemmi, after the true date of publication of D. lothari was corrected from 1971 to 1973. Deroceras dalmatinum, described by Grossu in the same article as D. klemmi, has been designated its junior synonym.

The holotype of D. klemmi was collected in Trieste, now in Italy. It is kept in the Natural History Museum of Vienna, together with invalid paratypes (i.e. specimens of other species). A valid paratype is kept in the Grigore Antipa National Museum of Natural History in Bucharest.

The species was named after the Austrian malacologist Walter Klemm (1898–1981), who was active in the Vienna museum at the time of Grossu's visit.

== Description ==
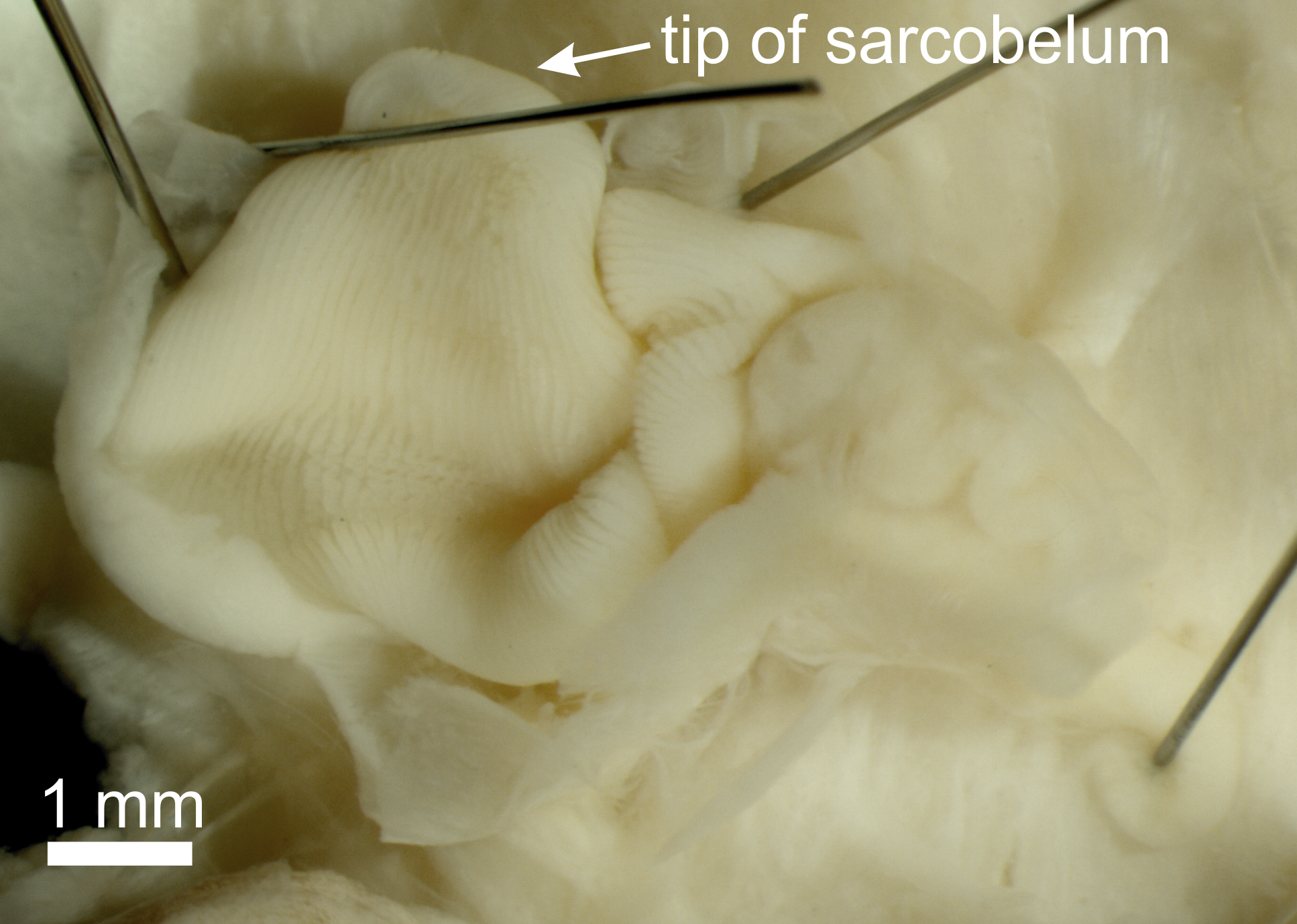
Penis opened to show the blunt-tipped sarcobelum

A typical length of the adult is 5 cm. On the basis of external appearance, D. klemmi is indistinguishable from Deroceras reticulatum and several other congeners such as Deroceras rodnae. The skin is cream coloured, often with darker flecks.

Internally, a branch of the gut called the rectal caecum is well developed, distinguishing it from Deroceras lothari, with which D. klemmi had formerly been confused; D. lothari is anyway distinct in its black colouration.

Deroceras klemmi is distinguished from D. reticulatum by characters of the penis. Deroceras klemmi always has a single penial gland, whereas D. reticulatum usually, but not always, has more than one. The single penial gland of D. klemmi tends to be more robust than those of D. reticulatum and is typically curved like a ram's horn with prominent papillae on the inside of the curve. But the better character to confirm D. klemmi demands opening the penis to examine the sarcobelum. In D. klemmi this is a flattened and blunt tongue, usually approaching the proportions of an equilateral triangle, and distinct from the more elongated and pointed sarcobelum of D. reticulatum.

== Distribution and Habitat ==
The species is known mostly from Slovenia and western Croatia, and also from adjacent parts of Italy and Austria. In Hungary the records are from synanthropic habitats, so may represent introductions. Reports from elsewhere in Italy and from Switzerland, Germany and France are false or insufficiently documented. The species is known from sea level up to 1500 m, both from open habitats and woods.
