= Deroceras juranum =

Scientific classification
- Domain: Eukaryota
- Kingdom: Animalia
- Phylum: Mollusca
- Class: Gastropoda
- Order: Stylommatophora
- Family: Agriolimacidae
- Genus: Deroceras
- Species: D. juranum

Binomial name
- Deroceras juranum Wüthrich, 1993

Species of gastropod

Deroceras juranum is a species of air-breathing land slug, a terrestrial pulmonate gastropod mollusk in the family Agriolimacidae.

== Taxonomy ==
Wüthrich (1993) described Deroceras juranum from the Jura Mountains in Switzerland, distinguishing it from the co-occurring Deroceras rodnae on the basis of Deroceras juranum's distinct violet coloration. Later the same coloration was found in Austrian populations by Jordaens et al. (1998) and in other species of Deroceras by Reise & Hutchinson (2001). Reise (1997) demonstrated that the violet coloration was controlled by a single Mendelian-inherited gene and thus considered Deroceras juranum to be a variety of Deroceras rodnae. It is treated thus in Wiktor’s (2000) monograph of the Agriolimacidae.

Hutchinson & Reise (2009) later realised that what had been considered Deroceras rodnae was actually two species with radically different mating behaviours and consistent, although subtle, differences in morphology. Molecular analyses supported this distinction. The more easterly distributed species can retain the name Deroceras rodnae, and the westerly distributed species must, somewhat confusingly, take the name Deroceras juranum.

== Description ==
Externally Deroceras juranum is indistinguishable from many other Deroceras, such as Deroceras praecox, Deroceras rodnae, Deroceras turcicum and Deroceras reticulatum. It is polymorphic in colour. Identifications to species level require dissection: illustrations of the genitalia are depicted in work by Hutchinson & Reise (2009).

== Distribution ==
Hutchinson & Reise (2009) confirmed that, besides the type locality in Jura Mountains of Switzerland, other populations in the Swiss Jura Mountains, Germany, Austria and the Czech Republic were Deroceras juranum. Earlier records of Deroceras rodnae s. l. from the west of its range are liable to refer to Deroceras juranum, but identifications from Spain and Italy have been questioned.
