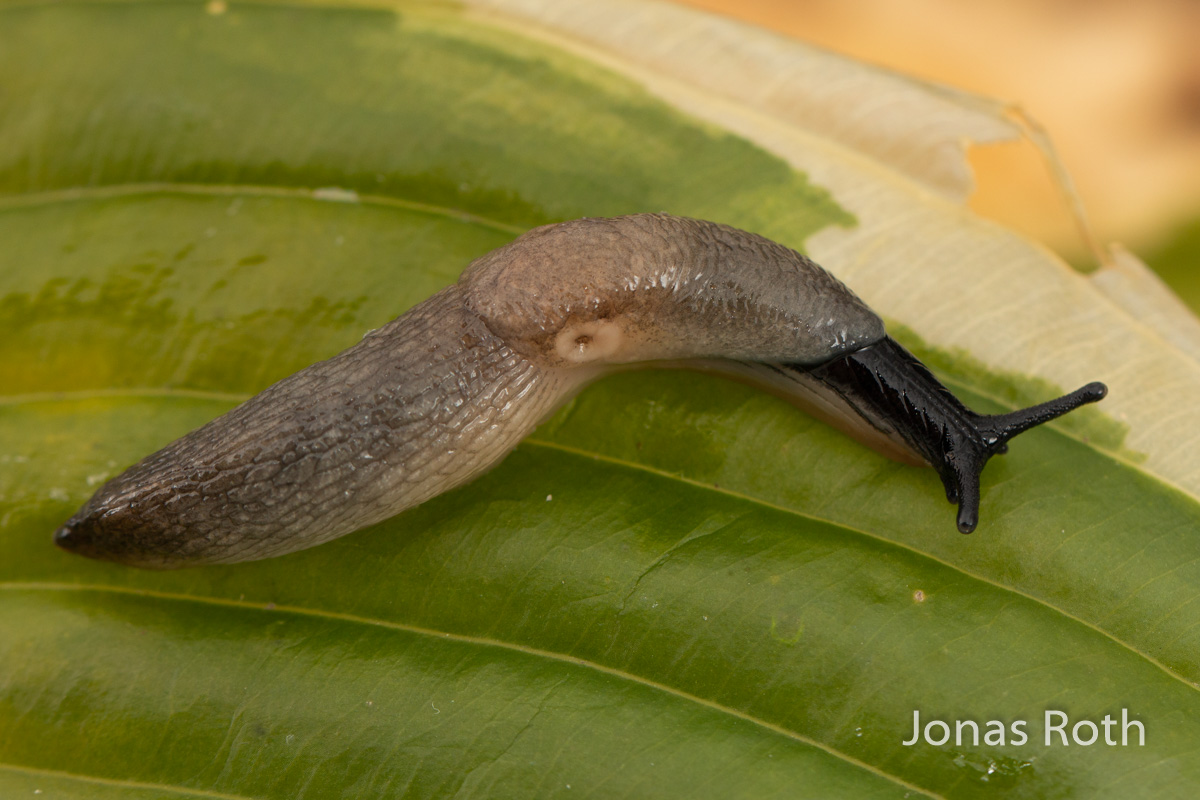

Scientific classification
- Kingdom: Animalia
- Phylum: Mollusca
- Class: Gastropoda
- Order: Stylommatophora
- Family: Agriolimacidae
- Genus: Krynickillus
- Species: K. melanocephalus

Binomial name
- Krynickillus melanocephalus Kaleniczenko, 1851

= Krynickillus melanocephalus =

Species of terrestrial slug

Krynickillus melanocephalus is a species of air-breathing land slug, a terrestrial gastropod mollusc in the family Agriolimacidae. It is an invasive species, spreading from regions around the Black Sea to Northern and Central Europe.

== Identification ==
The species resembles in form other agriolimacid slugs (notably Deroceras), so has the pneumostome in the rear half of the mantle and a tapering tail without a marked keel. However, it grows larger than Deroceras species (60 mm or occasionally more). The most distinctive feature is the deep black tentacles, head, and nape, with the dark colouration still visible under the front of the mantle. The congener Krynickillus urbanskii (Wiktor, 1971), occurring in Romania, Bulgaria and Turkey, has a paler black head and a pale nape.

== Distribution ==
The natural range of Krynickillus melanocephalus is the Caucasus, Crimea, eastern Turkey and northern Iran. It has been introduced more widely within Europe: further parts of Ukraine (e.g. Kyiv from 1998), further parts of Russia (Moscow, Novgorod and Tverskaya oblasts), Germany (since 1994), Latvia (since 1997), Belarus (since 2009), Sweden (since 2015), Lithuania (since 2017), Finland (since 2017), Hungary (since 2019), Slovakia (since 2020), Estonia, Poland (since 2022), Czech Republic (since 2024), Romania (since 2024), and Moldova (since 2025).

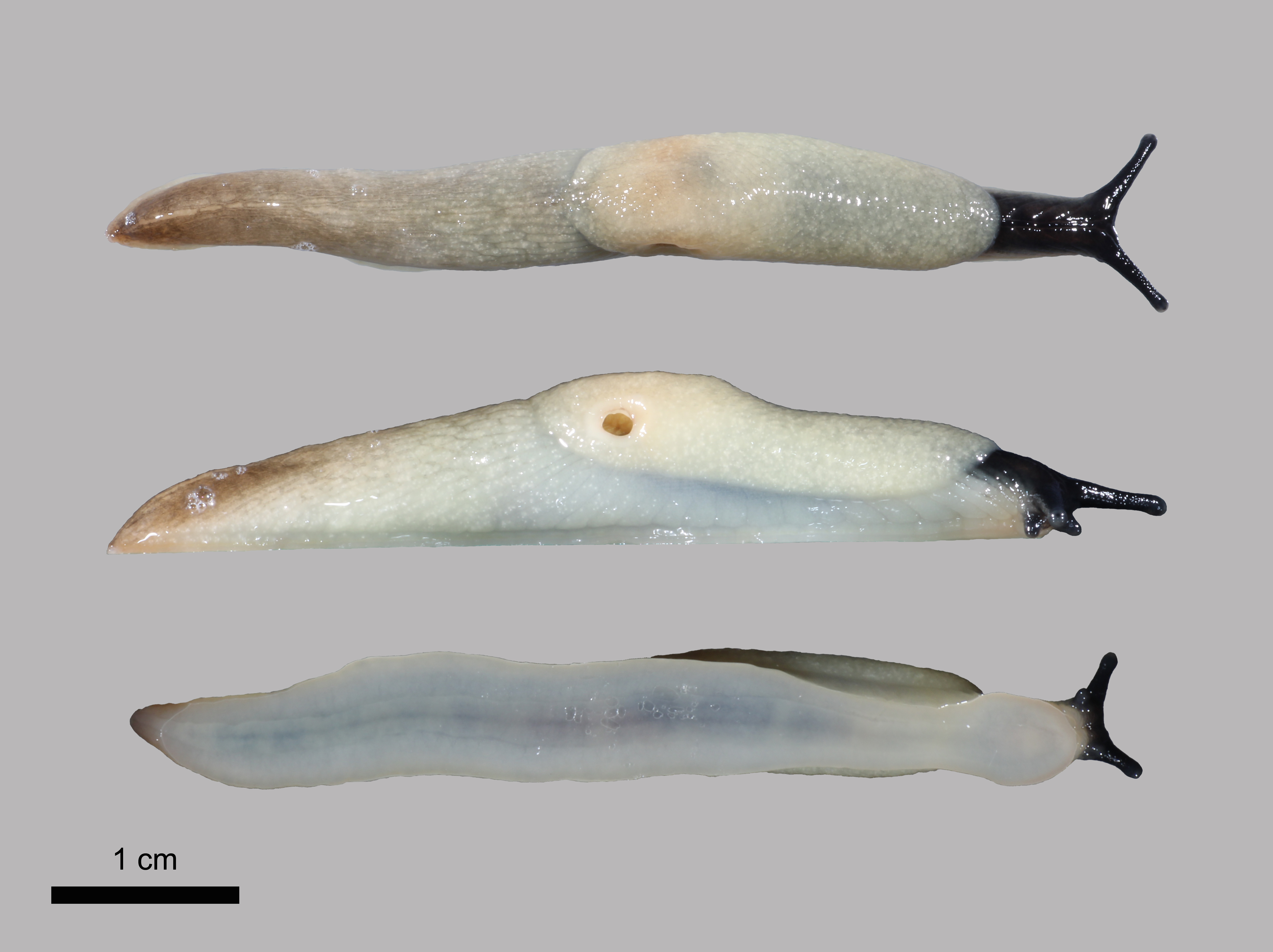
Three views of a Hungarian specimen

== Ecology ==
In its introduced range the species becomes adult in autumn and dies off in winter. It has spread from gardens to adjacent habitats, including woodland and meadows. Although it has sometimes been reported as a pest of crops, others have suggested that a diet of algae, fallen fruit, and fungi makes it less of a threat. In its native range this is a forest species. In experiments, slugs laid far more eggs in leaf litter than in moss, soil or gravel.
