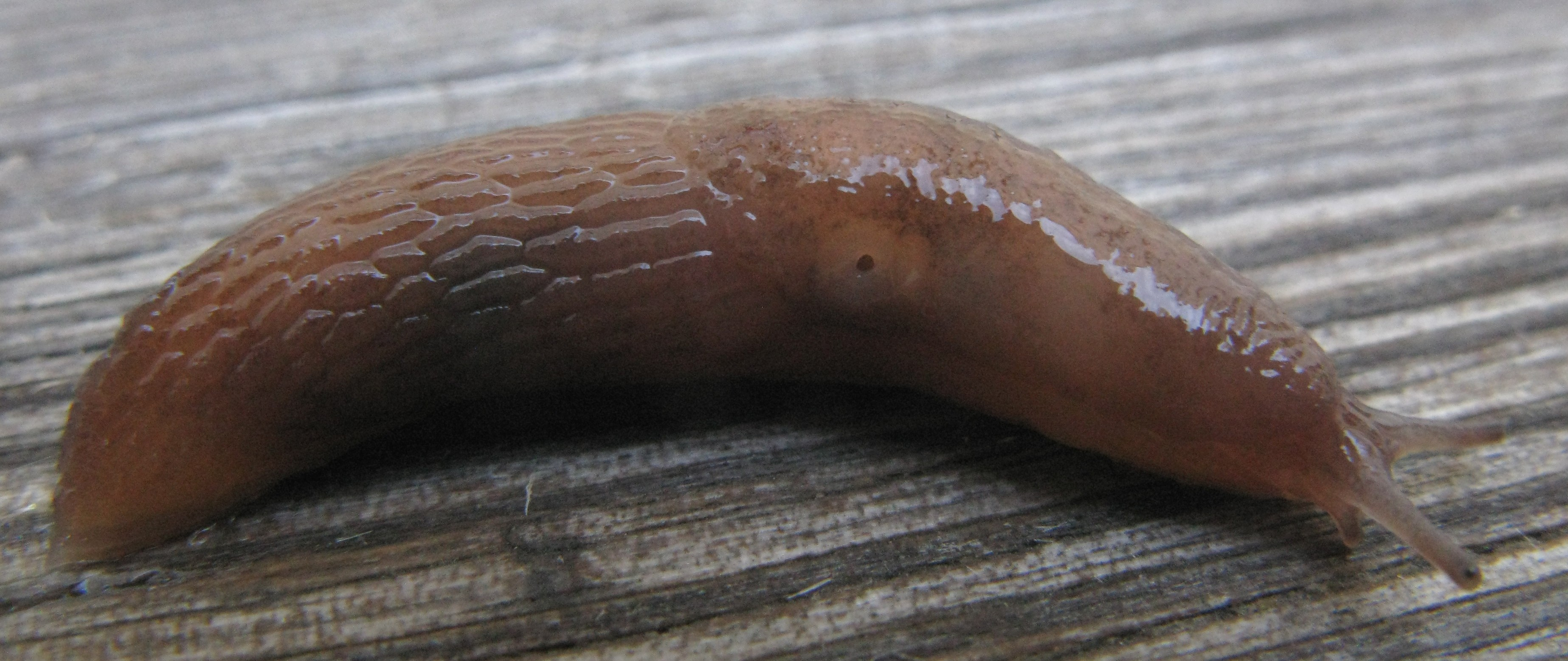

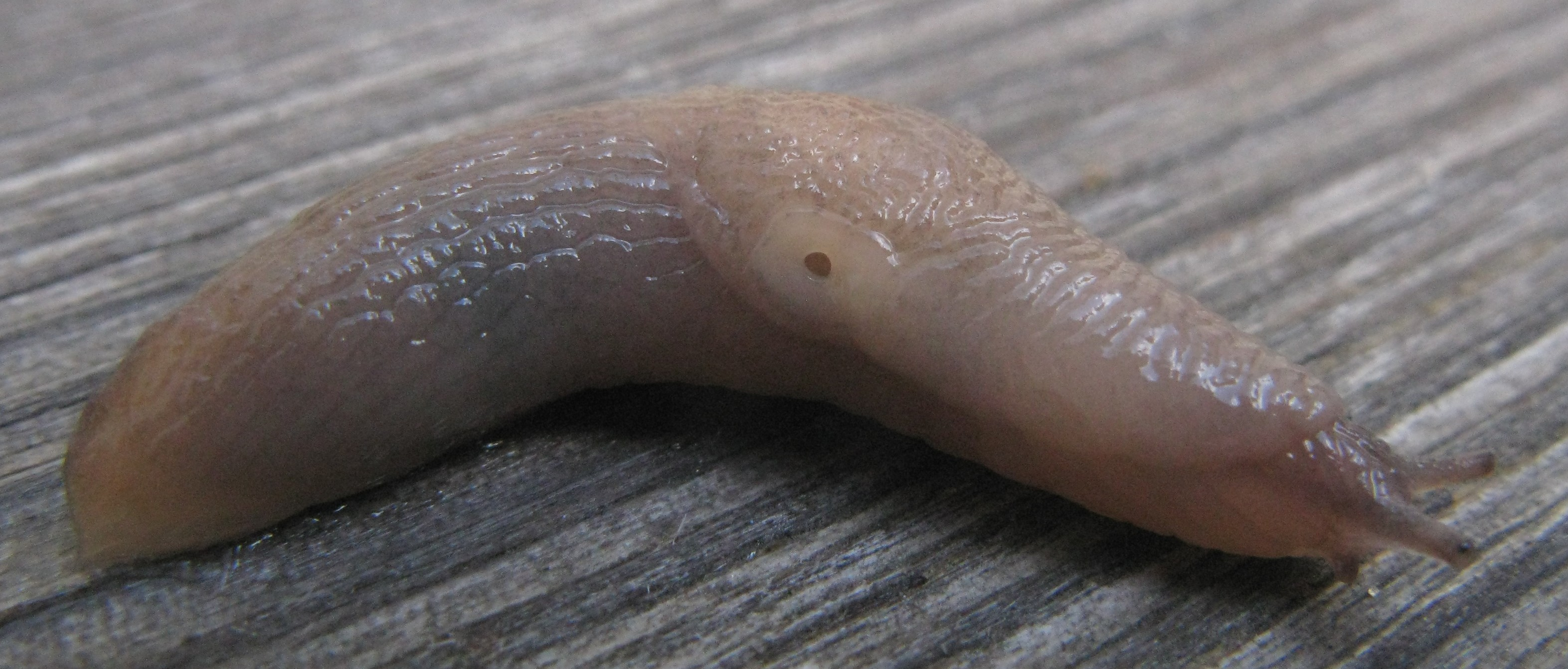
- Deroceras invadens from sites on Sicily

Conservation status
- Least Concern (IUCN 3.1)

- Secure (NatureServe)

Scientific classification
- Kingdom: Animalia
- Phylum: Mollusca
- Class: Gastropoda
- Order: Stylommatophora
- Family: Agriolimacidae
- Genus: Deroceras
- Species: D. invadens

Binomial name
- Deroceras invadens Reise, Hutchinson, Schunack & Schlitt, 2011

= Deroceras invadens =

Species of gastropod

Deroceras invadens is a species of air-breathing land slug, a terrestrial pulmonate gastropod mollusc in the family Agriolimacidae. Until 2011, this widely distributed species was known as Deroceras panormitanum, and earlier as Deroceras caruanae or Agriolimax caruanae, but in that year Reise et al. showed that these names refer to a distinct species of similar external appearance known at that time only from Sicily and Malta. Consequently, although the more widespread species was already well known, it then had to be redescribed under the new name of D. invadens. Genetic evidence has indicated that D. invadens is native in southern Italy, including parts of Sicily, and possibly parts of central Italy. Elsewhere it has been introduced, predominantly within the last 100 years, but its spread has been constrained by cold winter temperatures.

== Description ==
Adults are usually 20–35 mm long. The skin and flesh are watery and fairly transparent. The colour of the skin varies between light greyish-brown to almost black. Close inspection reveals fine dark spotting usually over the whole body; this shows up better in alcohol-preserved specimens. Often, but not always, the respiratory pore is pale and unspotted. The mucus is colourless.

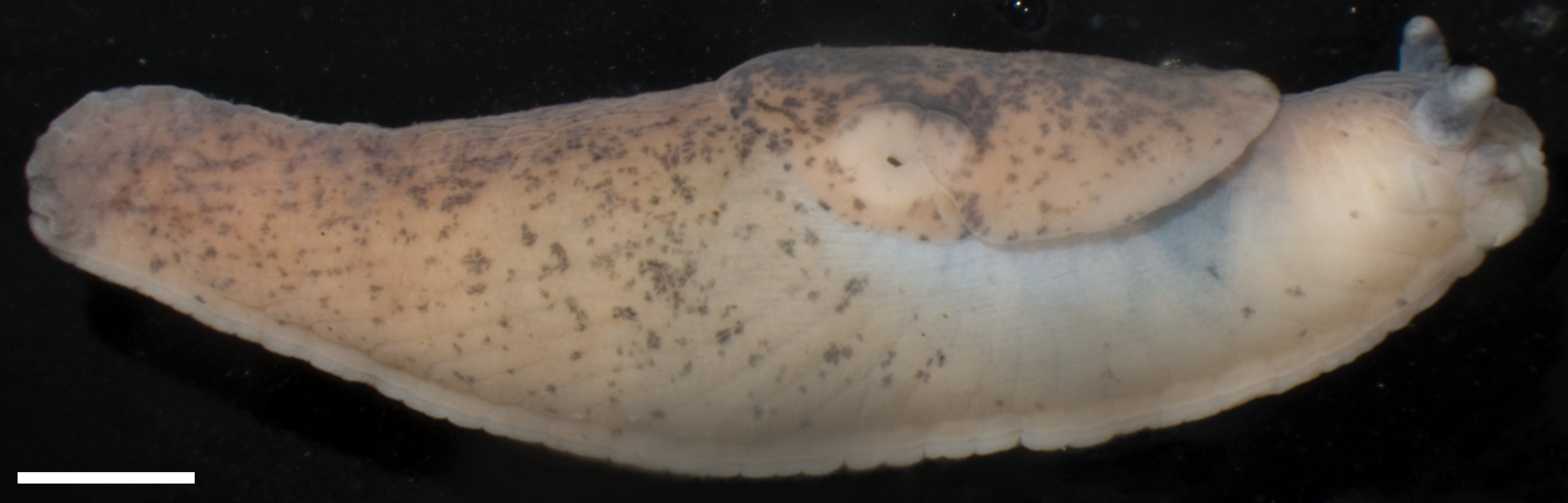
D. invadens preserved in ethanol. Scale = 3 mm

Particularly in North America, some Deroceras laeve grow large enough that they closely resemble D. invadens. A useful clue to distinguish them is the profile of the end of the tail when the animal has been disturbed or is preserved. The tail of D. invadens usually slants vertically upward from the sole for a short distance, or even bends backwards. The tail of D. laeve slopes forward above the sole. Also, the tail of D. invadens is longer than the mantle, whereas it is the same length or shorter in D. laeve.

Penis, twisted to reveal the ventral side

Nevertheless, dissection is required to distinguish D. invadens reliably from D. laeve and from various similar Deroceras species occurring in Europe, such as Deroceras sturanyi, the true Deroceras panormitanum, and Deroceras cecconii. The article by Reise et al. discussed and figured the most critical anatomical characters. In most populations of D. invadens, the proximal penis has two side pockets (the penial caecum and penial lobe); these have roughly equal widths and both have rounded, stout ends. A prominent appending penial gland with 3–7 branches attaches between the caecum and lobe on the dorsal side; these branches are less knobbly in outline than those of D. panormitanum. The penial retractor muscle attaches between the caecum and lobe on the ventral side. The intestinal caecum is either absent or represented merely by a widening of the rectum. Barker (1999) and Sirgel (1973) detail various other aspects of the anatomy.

== Distribution ==
The distribution was extensively reviewed by Hutchinson et al. in 2014. The native range is the southern and perhaps central parts of Italy but the first certain record is from Britain in 1930. Deroceras invadens now occurs in very many other parts of the world, although there is only one record from Asia. The list below gives dates of the first reported findings (outdoors unless stated); oceanic Islands are considered separately at the end.

Distribution of Deroceras invadens. Based on Figure 4 of Hutchinson et al. 2014, with subsequent published records from Israel and Montenegro added. The circled i's indicate countries from which exported goods were found to contain this species. Otherwise each symbol indicates presence on a 1-degree grid of latitude and longitude

Europe

- Italy – native to the south, including parts of Sicily
- Great Britain – 1930
- Denmark – 1937
- France – 1945
- Sweden – c. 1957 (greenhouses), ≤1980 (outdoors)
- Ireland – 1959
- Finland – ≤1961 (greenhouses), ≤2014 (outdoors)
- Norway – 1967 (greenhouses), 1983 (outdoors)
- Belgium – 1968
- Netherlands – 1969
- Spain – 1974 (earlier record from Canaries)
- Portugal – 1977 (earlier record from Azores)
- Austria – 1977
- Germany – 1978
- Switzerland – 1982
- Czech Republic – 1996
- Luxembourg – 1997
- Andorra – ≤2000
- Poland – 2001
- Slovakia – 2003 (greenhouse), 2018 (outdoors)
- Russia – 2009 (greenhouses, Tver Oblast)
- Greece – 2011
- Monaco – 2012
- San Marino – 2013
- Montenegro – 2014
- Liechtenstein – 2014
- Hungary – 2019; a 1974 report was retracted by its author

Earlier records of "D. panormitanum sensu lato" from south-eastern Europe (e.g. Bulgaria, parts of Greece) should be rechecked, given the taxonomic confusion prior to 2011; records from Romania and Lithuania are erroneous or unconfirmed.

Africa

- South Africa – 1963
- Egypt – 2005–7
- Kenya – 2012 (found on exports to USA)

Asia and Australasia

- Israel – 2013 (greenhouse)
- Australia – 1936
- New Zealand – 1974 (circumstantial evidence for much earlier date; slightly earlier record from Raoul Island)

North America:

- USA: California (1940), Washington State and Oregon (2001), Colorado (2004), Utah (2006), Washington D.C. (1998)
- Canada: Quebec (greenhouses 1966), British Columbia (1974), Alberta (2021), Newfoundland (2012). Records from Ontario require confirmation.
- Mexico – 1974

Central and South America

- Costa Rica – 2006
- Panamá – 2007 (found on exports to USA)
- Colombia – 1975
- Ecuador – 2012 (found on exports to USA in 2004)
- Peru – 2012 (found on exports to USA)
- Chile – ≤2003 (earlier record from Juan Fernández Islands)
- Argentina – 2004
- Brazil – 1991

Oceanic Islands

- Faroe Islands (Denmark) – 1970
- Madeira (Portugal) – 1980
- Azores (Portugal) – 1957
- Canary Islands (Spain) – 1947
- Tristan da Cunha (UK) – 1982
- Raoul Island (New Zealand) – 1973
- Chatham Islands (New Zealand) – 1976
- Lord Howe Island (Australia) – 2000
- Norfolk Island (Australia) – 2013
- Marion Island (South Africa) – 1972
- Juan Fernández Islands (Chile) – 1962

== Ecology ==
Deroceras invadens typically occurs in disturbed sites and is often easiest to find under rubbish. Already in the 1980s it was the most widespread slug species in Manchester gardens, and a 2020–21 survey of gardens throughout Britain found it to occur in a higher proportion of them than any other slug. However, this species has also spread to natural habitats such as woodland and grassland (e.g. in Britain, Tenerife, South Africa and Australia). It prefers areas of high humidity and cannot survive temperatures below –7 °C. Its distribution appears restricted by low winter temperatures, which could explain its slow and only partial colonisation of central Europe and its recent range expansion in Sweden following climate amelioration. It can be a significant pest in gardens, greenhouses, pasture, and arable fields. In captivity, slugs eat their own body weight of lettuce in two or three days.

In North Wales, most adults start to lay eggs in autumn and have died by early spring; the species can be found in any season, but it is most abundant in late spring. In New Zealand pastureland, populations fall considerably in summer. In agricultural fields in northern Italy, D. invadens was commonly trapped from November to May, but not at all in summer.

A wild-collected specimen of this species has been found to be hosting larvae of the lungworm Angiostrongylus vasorum, which causes canine angiostrongylosis, a serious disease for domestic dogs.

== Behaviour ==
A 5-minute video showing the copulation of Deroceras invadens from the type locality. The penial caecae of both partners evert after 31 s. The penial lobe of one partner everts (partially hidden) after 75 s, and the "tentacles" of its penial gland evert after 140 s. These events occur later with the other partner, after 156 s and 196 s.

The mating behaviour of this species has been particularly well studied, partly to provide taxonomic characters. Mating starts when one individual closely follows the flattened tail of the other (precourtship). Typically after some minutes the leader turns back and protrudes its sarcobelum (a tapering finger-like part of the penis), as does its partner shortly afterwards. The partners often form a circle head to tail. Early courtship involves violent biting of the partner, lashing the sarcobelum against the partner, and bursts of tail wagging. This is gradually replaced by more gentle-looking stroking of the sarcobelum across the partner. During courtship, sperm accumulates in the penial caecum. After about 90 minutes the partners orient themselves face-to-face, nibble the base of the partner's raised sarcobelum, and suddenly their penises simultaneously evert. The finger-like penial caecum curves round the back of the partner's sarcobelum, transferring sperm onto it. The penises remain everted for a variable period (typically some minutes) before the penial lobe and then the penial gland also evert. The latter transfers a secretion onto the partner. This is directly followed by retraction of the penis (each partner thereby taking up the transferred sperm) and then separation.

Laboratory experiments suggest that D. invadens shows a diurnal rhythm of active locomotion and feeding at night, then inactivity in or below the litter layer during the day; the rhythm is entrained by light. This feeding cycle is accompanied by regular cytological changes in the organs of digestion.

Deroceras invadens exhibited the highest crawling speed (4.9 millimetres per second; 0.19 in/s) amongst measurements from 28 species of terrestrial slug and snail.

Deroceras invadens usually avoids areas treated with its parasite Phasmarhabditis hermaphrodita, a nematode which is used commercially to control slugs. However, the avoidance is replaced by attraction once the slug is infected, apparently an example of host manipulation. Also, another species of parasitic nematode, Phasmarhabditis neopapillosa, is attractive even to uninfected D. invadens.
