= List of non-marine molluscs of Slovakia =

Location of Slovakia

Slovakia is a land-locked country, and therefore the molluscs of Slovakia are all land and freshwater species. There are 247 species of molluscs living in the wild in Slovakia. In addition there are 9 gastropod species living only in greenhouses.

There are a total of 219 species of gastropods, which breaks down to 51 species of freshwater gastropods, and 168 species of land gastropods, plus 28 species of bivalves living in the wild.

There are 8 non-indigenous gastropod species (3 freshwater and 5 land species) and 3 species of bivalves in the wild in Slovakia. This is a total of 6 freshwater non-indigenous species of wild molluscs.

Summary table of number of species

	Slovakia
freshwater gastropods	51
land gastropods	168
gastropods altogether	219
bivalves	28
molluscs altogether	247
non-indigenous gastropods in the wild	3 freshwater and 5 land
non-indigenous synantrop gastropods	9
non-indigenous bivalves in the wild	3
non-indigenous synantrop bivalves	0
non-indigenous molluscs altogether	20

There are 2 extinct species in Slovakia (locally extinct): Theodoxus transversalis and Esperiana esperi.

There are endemic species of molluscs in Slovakia:

- Alzoniella slovenica in Slovakia (and in Moravia in the Czech Republic too)
- Alopia bielzii clathrata (Rossmässler, 1857)
- Deroceras fatrense

== History ==
Grid distribution maps of all species were made by Lisický (1991).

A faunal list by Čejka et al. (2007) included 245 species. A list by Horsák et al. (2010) included 247 species.

== Freshwater gastropods ==
The list is in zoological order rather than alphabetical order. Freshwater gastropods in the Slovakia include:

Neritidae

- Theodoxus danubialis (C. Pfeiffer, 1828)
- Theodoxus fluviatilis (Linnaeus, 1758) - non-indigenous
- Theodoxus transversalis (C. Pfeiffer, 1828) - extinct

Viviparidae

- Viviparus acerosus (Bourguignat, 1862)
- Viviparus contectus (Millet, 1813)

Thiaridae

- Esperiana daudebartii acicularis (Férussac, 1823) - syn. Microcolpia daudebartii (Prevost, 1821)
- Esperiana esperi (Férussac, 1823) - extinct

Hydrobiidae

- Potamopyrgus antipodarum (Gray, 1843) - non-indigenous
- Alzoniella slovenica (Ložek & Brtek, 1964) - endemic to Slovakia (and in Moravia in the Czech Republic too), synonyms: Belgrandiella alticola Ložek & Brtek, 1964, Belgrandiella bojnicensis Ložek & Brtek, 1964.

Amnicolidae

- Bythinella austriaca (von Frauenfeld, 1857) s. lat.
- Bythinella hungarica Hazay, 1881
- Bythinella metarubra Falniowski, 1987
- Bythinella pannonica (Frauenfeld, 1865) - synonym: Sadleriana pannonica (Frauenfeld, 1865)
- Bythinella steffeki Grego & Glöer, 2019

Lithoglyphidae

- Lithoglyphus naticoides (C. Pfeiffer, 1828)

Bithyniidae

- Bithynia leachii (Sheppard, 1823)
- Bithynia troschelii Paasch, 1842 - synonym: Bythinia transsilvanica (E. A. Bielz, 1853)
- Bithynia tentaculata (Linnaeus, 1758)

Valvatidae

- Valvata cristata O. F. Müller, 1774
- Valvata macrostoma Mörch, 1864 - synonym: Valvata pulchella auct. nec Studer, 1820
- Valvata piscinalis (O. F. Müller, 1774)
- Borysthenia naticina (Menke, 1845)

Acroloxidae

- Acroloxus lacustris (Linnaeus, 1758)

Lymnaeidae

- Galba truncatula (O. F. Müller, 1774)
- Stagnicola corvus (Gmelin, 1791)
- Stagnicola palustris O. F. Müller, 1774 s. str. - synonym: Stagnicola turricula (Held, 1836)
- Radix ampla (Hartmann, 1821)
- Radix auricularia (Linnaeus, 1758)
- Radix ovata (Draparnaud, 1805)
- Radix peregra (O. F. Müller, 1774) s. str.
- Lymnaea stagnalis (Linnaeus, 1758)

Physidae

- Aplexa hypnorum (Linnaeus, 1758)
- Physa fontinalis (Linnaeus, 1758)
- Physella acuta (Draparnaud, 1805) - non-indigenous

Planorbidae

- Planorbis carinatus O. F. Müller, 1774
- Planorbis planorbis (Linnaeus, 1758)
- Anisus leucostoma (Millet, 1813)
- Anisus septemgyratus (Rossmässler, 1835)
- Anisus spirorbis (Linnaeus, 1758)
- Anisus vortex (Linnaeus, 1758)
- Anisus vorticulus (Troschel, 1834)
- Bathyomphalus contortus (Linnaeus, 1758)
- Gyraulus acronicus (A. Férussac, 1807)
- Gyraulus albus (O. F. Müller, 1774)
- Gyraulus crista (Linnaeus, 1758)
- Gyraulus laevis (Alder, 1838)
- Gyraulus riparius (Westerlund, 1865)
- Gyraulus rossmaessleri (Auerswald, 1852)
- Hippeutis complanatus (Linnaeus, 1758)
- Segmentina nitida (O. F. Müller, 1774)
- Planorbarius corneus (Linnaeus, 1758)
- Ancylus fluviatilis O. F. Müller, 1774
- Ferrissia fragilis (Tryon, 1863) - syn. Ferrissia clessiniana (Jickeli, 1882)

== Land gastropods ==
Land gastropods in Slovakia include:

Aciculidae

- Acicula parcelineata (Clessin, 1911)
- Platyla polita (Hartmann, 1840)

Ellobiidae

- Carychium minimum O. F. Müller, 1774
- Carychium tridentatum (Risso, 1826)

Cochlicopidae

- Cochlicopa lubrica (O. F. Müller, 1774)
- Cochlicopa lubricella (Rossmässler, 1835)
- Cochlicopa nitens (M. von Gallenstein, 1848)

Orculidae

- Orcula dolium (Draparnaud, 1801)
- Pagodulina pagodula (Des Moulins, 1830)
- Sphyradium doliolum (Bruguière, 1792)

Chondrinidae

- Abida secale (Draparnaud, 1801)
- Granaria frumentum (Draparnaud, 1801)
- Chondrina clienta (Westerlund, 1883)
- Chondrina tatrica Ložek, 1948

Pupillidae

- Pupilla alpicola (Charpentier, 1837)
- Pupilla muscorum (Linnaeus, 1758)
- Pupilla pratensis (Clessin, 1871)
- Pupilla sterrii (Voith, 1840)
- Pupilla triplicata (Studer, 1820)

Argnidae

- Argna bielzi (Rossmässler, 1859)

Pyramidulidae

- Pyramidula pusilla (Vallot, 1801)

Spelaeodiscidae

- Spelaeodiscus tatricus Hazay, 1883

Valloniidae

- Vallonia costata (O. F. Müller, 1774)
- Vallonia enniensis (Gredler, 1856)
- Vallonia excentrica Sterki, 1893
- Vallonia pulchella (O. F. Müller, 1774)
- Acanthinula aculeata (O. F. Müller, 1774)

Vertiginidae

- Columella aspera Waldén, 1966
- Columella columella (G. v. Martens, 1830) - only subspecies Columella columella gredleri
- Columella edentula (Draparnaud, 1805)
- Truncatellina claustralis (Gredler, 1856)
- Truncatellina costulata (Nilsson, 1823)
- Truncatellina cylindrica (A. Férussac, 1807)
- Vertigo alpestris Alder, 1838
- Vertigo angustior Jeffreys, 1830
- Vertigo antivertigo (Draparnaud, 1801)
- Vertigo geyeri Lindholm, 1925
- Vertigo modesta (Say, 1824) - synonym: Vertigo arctica (Wallenberg, 1858)
- Vertigo moulinsiana (Dupuy, 1849)
- Vertigo pusilla O. F. Müller, 1774
- Vertigo pygmaea (Draparnaud, 1801)
- Vertigo substriata (Jeffreys, 1833)

Enidae

- Chondrula tridens (O. F. Müller, 1774) - also subspecies Chondrula tridens eximia (Rossmässler, 1837)
- Ena montana (Draparnaud, 1801)
- Merdigera obscura (O. F. Müller, 1774)
- Zebrina detrita (O. F. Müller, 1774)

Clausiliidae

- Alopia bielzii E. A. Bielz, 1856 - only endemic subspecies Alopia bielzii clathrata (Rossmässler, 1857)
- Cochlodina cerata (Rossmässler, 1836)
- Cochlodina fimbriata (Rossmässler, 1835) - only subspecies Cochlodina fimbriata remota Ložek, 1952
- Cochlodina laminata (Montagu, 1803)
- Cochlodina orthostoma (Menke, 1828)
- Ruthenica filograna (Rossmässler, 1836)
- Pseudofusulus varians (C. Pfeiffer, 1828)
- Macrogastra borealis (O. Boettger, 1878) - synonym: Macrogastra latestriata (A. Schmidt, 1857)
- Macrogastra plicatula (Draparnaud, 1801)
- Macrogastra tumida (Rossmässler, 1836)
- Macrogastra ventricosa (Draparnaud, 1801)
- Clausilia cruciata (Studer, 1820)
- Clausilia dubia Draparnaud, 1805
- Clausilia parvula Férussac, 1807 - synonym: Clausilia rugosa parvula Férussac, 1807
- Clausilia pumila C. Pfeiffer, 1828
- Laciniaria plicata (Draparnaud, 1801)
- Balea biplicata (Montagu, 1803) - synonym: Alinda biplicata
- Pseudalinda stabilis (L. Pfeiffer, 1847)
- Balea perversa (Linnaeus, 1758)
- Vestia elata (Rossmässler, 1836)
- Vestia gulo (E. A. Bielz, 1859)
- Vestia turgida (Rossmässler, 1836)
- Bulgarica cana (Held, 1836)

Succineidae

- Succinella oblonga (Draparnaud, 1801)
- Succinea putris (Linnaeus, 1758)
- Oxyloma elegans (Risso, 1826)
- Quickella arenaria (Bouchard-Chantereaux, 1837)

Ferussaciidae

- Cecilioides acicula (O. F. Müller, 1774)
- Cecilioides petitiana (Benoit, 1862)

Punctidae

- Punctum pygmaeum (Draparnaud, 1801)

Helicodiscidae

- Lucilla scintilla (Lowe, 1852) - non-indigenous
- Lucilla singleyana (H. B. Baker, 1929) - non-indigenous

Discidae

- Discus perspectivus (Megerle von Mühlfeld, 1816)
- Discus rotundatus (O. F. Müller, 1774)
- Discus ruderatus (Férussac, 1821)

Gastrodontidae

- Zonitoides nitidus (O. F. Müller, 1774)

Euconulidae

- Euconulus praticola (Reinhardt, 1883)
- Euconulus fulvus (O. F. Müller, 1774)

Oxychilidae

- Aegopinella epipedostoma (Fagot, 1879)
- Aegopinella minor (Stabile, 1864)
- Aegopinella nitens (Michaud, 1831)
- Aegopinella pura (Alder, 1830)
- Perpolita hammonis (Ström, 1765)
- Perpolita petronella (L. Pfeiffer, 1853)
- Oxychilus cellarius (O. F. Müller, 1774)
- Oxychilus depressus (Sterki, 1880)
- Oxychilus draparnaudi (Beck, 1837)
- Oxychilus glaber (Rossmässler, 1835)
- Oxychilus hydatinus (Rossmässler 1838)
- Oxychilus inopinatus (Uličný, 1887)
- Oxychilus orientalis (Clessin, 1877)
- Daudebardia brevipes (Draparnaud, 1805)
- Daudebardia rufa (Draparnaud, 1805)
- Carpathica calophana (Westerlund, 1881)

Pristilomatidae

- Vitrea contracta (Westerlund, 1871)
- Vitrea crystallina (O. F. Müller, 1774)
- Vitrea diaphana (Studer, 1820)
- Vitrea subrimata (Reinhardt, 1871)
- Vitrea transsylvanica (Clessin, 1877)

Vitrinidae

- Vitrina pellucida (O. F. Müller, 1774)
- Eucobresia nivalis (Dumont & Mortillet, 1854)
- Semilimax kotulae Westerlund, 1883)
- Semilimax semilimax (J. Férussac, 1802)

Milacidae

- Tandonia budapestensis (Hazay, 1881)
- Tandonia kusceri (Wagner, 1931) - non-indigenous

Limacidae

- Bielzia coerulans (M. Bielz, 1851)
- Limax cinereoniger Wolf, 1803
- Limax maximus Linnaeus, 1758
- Limacus flavus (Linnaeus, 1758)
- Malacolimax tenellus (O. F. Müller, 1774)
- Lehmannia macroflagellata Grossu & Lupu, 1962
- Lehmannia marginata (O. F. Müller, 1774)
- Lehmannia nyctelia (Bourguignat, 1861)

Agriolimacidae

- Deroceras agreste (Linnaeus, 1758)
- Deroceras fatrense Mácha, 1981
- Deroceras laeve (O. F. Müller, 1774)
- Deroceras praecox Wiktor, 1966
- Deroceras reticulatum (O. F. Müller, 1774)
- Deroceras rodnae Grossu & Lupu, 1965
- Deroceras sturanyi (Simroth, 1894)
- Deroceras turcicum (Simroth, 1894) - non-indigenous

Boettgerillidae

- Boettgerilla pallens Simroth, 1912 - non-indigenous

Arionidae

- Arion circumscriptus Johnston, 1828
- Arion distinctus Mabille, 1868
- Arion fasciatus (Nilsson, 1823)
- Arion fuscus (O. F. Müller, 1774) - synonym: Arion subfuscus (Draparnaud, 1805) part.
- Arion rufus (Linnaeus, 1758)
- Arion silvaticus Lohmander, 1937
- Arion vulgaris Moquin-Tandon, 1855 - non-indigenous

Bradybaenidae

- Fruticicola fruticum (O. F. Müller, 1774)

Helicodontidae

- Helicodonta obvoluta (O. F. Müller, 1774)

Hygromiidae

- Euomphalia strigella (Draparnaud, 1801)
- Monacha cartusiana (O. F. Müller, 1774)
- Trochulus hispidus (Linnaeus, 1758)
- Trochulus striolatus (C. Pfeiffer, 1828)
- Trochulus villosulus (Rossmässler, 1838)
- Trochulus lubomirskii (Slósarskii, 1881)
- Petasina bakowskii (Polinski, 1929)
- Petasina bielzi (A. Schmidt, 1860)
- Petasina filicina (L. Pfeiffer, 1841)
- Petasina unidentata (Draparnaud, 1805)
- Helicopsis striata (O. F. Müller, 1774)
- Candidula unifasciata (Poiret, 1801) - synonym: Candidula soosiana (J. Wagner, 1933)
- Xerolenta obvia (Menke, 1828) - synonym: Helicella candicans (L. Pfeiffer, 1841)
- Perforatella bidentata (Gmelin, 1791)
- Perforatella dibothrion (M. V. Kimakowicz, 1884)
- Monachoides incarnatus (O. F. Müller, 1774)
- Monachoides vicinus (Rossmässler, 1842)
- Pseudotrichia rubiginosa (Rossmässler, 1838)
- Urticicola umbrosus (C. Pfeiffer, 1828)
- Hygromia transsylvanica (Westerlund, 1876)

Helicidae

- Arianta arbustorum (Linnaeus, 1758)
- Faustina faustina (Rossmässler, 1835)
- Faustina rossmässleri (L. Pfeiffer, 1842) - synonym: Chilostoma rossmaessleri (L. Pfeiffer, 1842)
- Chilostoma cingulella (Rossmässler, 1837)
- Isognomostoma isognomostomos (Schröter, 1784)
- Causa holosericea (Studer, 1820)
- Cepaea hortensis (O. F. Müller, 1774)
- Cepaea vindobonensis (Férussac, 1821)
- Helix lutescens Rossmässler, 1837
- Helix pomatia Linnaeus, 1758

== Freshwater bivalves ==
Freshwater bivalves in Slovakia include:

Unionidae

- Unio crassus Philipsson, 1788
- Unio pictorum (Linnaeus, 1758)
- Unio tumidus Philipsson, 1788
- Anodonta anatina (Linnaeus, 1758)
- Anodonta cygnea (Linnaeus, 1758)
- Pseudanodonta complanata (Rossmässler, 1835)
- Sinanodonta woodiana (Lea, 1834) - non-indigenous

Corbiculidae

- Corbicula fluminea (O. F. Müller, 1774) - non-indigenous

Sphaeriidae

- Sphaerium corneum (Linnaeus, 1758) s. lat.
- Sphaerium rivicola (Lamarck, 1818)
- Sphaerium solidum (Normand, 1844)
- Sphaerium nucleus (Studer, 1820)
- Musculium lacustre (O. F. Müller, 1774)
- Pisidium amnicum (O. F. Müller, 1774)
- Pisidium casertanum (Poli, 1791)
- Pisidium henslowanum (Sheppard, 1823)
- Pisidium hibernicum Westerlund, 1894
- Pisidium globulare (Clessin, 1873)
- Pisidium milium Held, 1836
- Pisidium moitessierianum Paladilhe, 1866
- Pisidium nitidum Jenyns, 1832
- Pisidium obtusale (Lamarck, 1818)
- Pisidium personatum Malm, 1855
- Pisidium pseudosphaerium Favre, 1927
- Pisidium subtruncatum Malm, 1855
- Pisidium supinum A. Schmidt, 1851
- Pisidium tenuilineatum Stelfox, 1918

Dreissenidae

- Dreissena polymorpha (Pallas, 1771)

== Synanthropic molluscs ==
These 9 species do not live in the wild or are not recorded in the wild yet, but they live in greenhouses and similar biotopes as "hothouse alien" species. All 9 of them are gastropods.

List (alphabetically according to scientific name):

- Deroceras panormitanum (Lessona et Pollonera, 1882)
- Gulella io
- Lehmannia valentiana
- Melanoides tuberculata
- Opeas pumilum
- Planorbella duryi
- Pomacea bridgesii
- Pseudosuccinea columella
- Zonitoides arboreus

== See also ==
Undescribed species of Slovakia include Hauffenia sp. nov. (not counted in this list).

Lists of molluscs of surrounding countries:

- List of non-marine molluscs of the Czech Republic
- List of non-marine molluscs of Poland
- List of non-marine molluscs of Ukraine
- List of non-marine molluscs of Austria
- List of non-marine molluscs of Hungary
