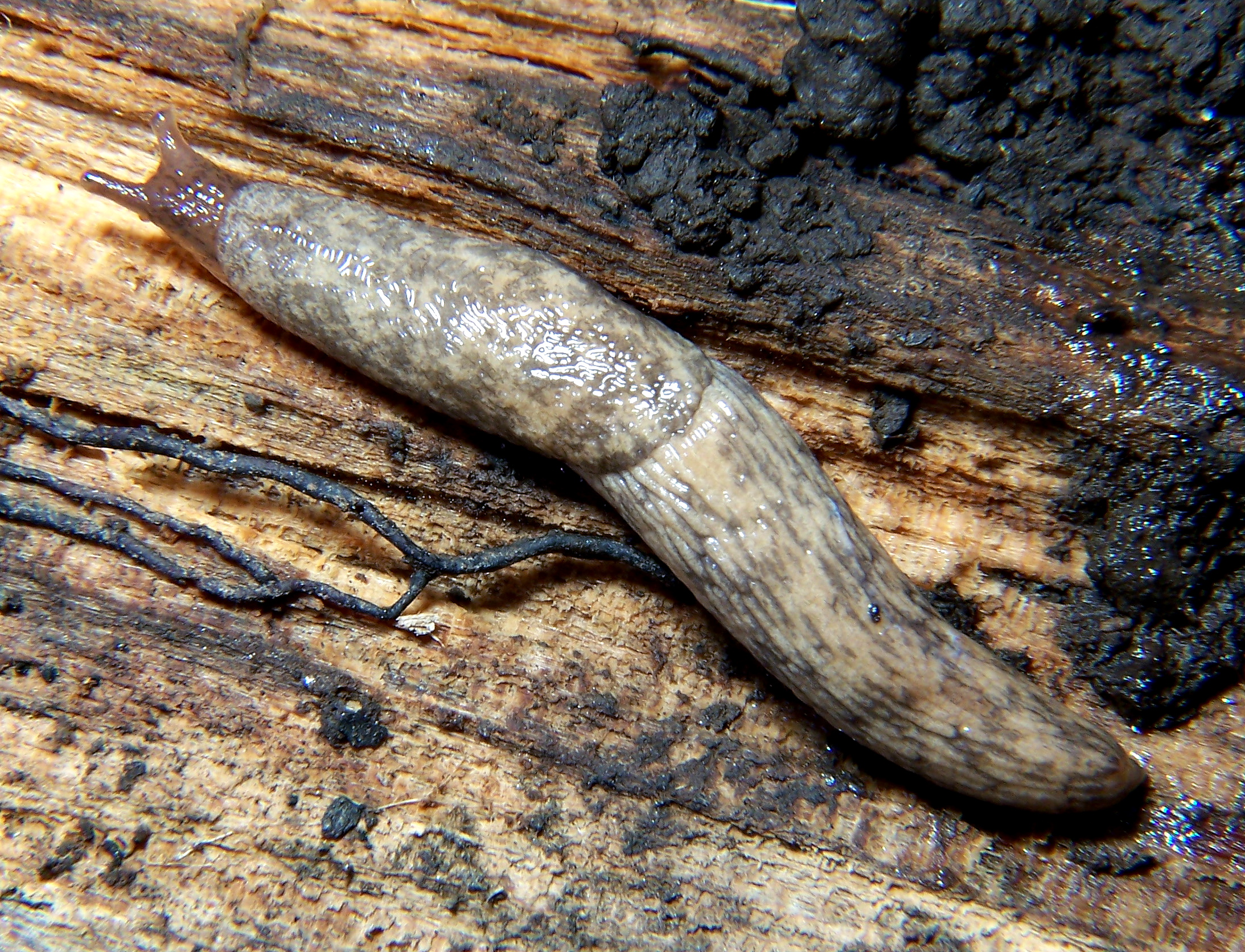
- Adult Deroceras reticulatum

Conservation status
- Least Concern (IUCN 3.1) (Europe regional assessment)

- Secure (NatureServe)

Scientific classification
- Kingdom: Animalia
- Phylum: Mollusca
- Class: Gastropoda
- Order: Stylommatophora
- Family: Agriolimacidae
- Genus: Deroceras
- Species: D. reticulatum

Binomial name
- Deroceras reticulatum (O. F. Müller, 1774)

Synonyms
- Agriolimax reticulatus (Müller, 1774) Limax reticulatus Müller, 1774

= Deroceras reticulatum =

Species of gastropod

Deroceras reticulatum, common names the grey field slug, grey garden slug, and milky slug, is a species of small air-breathing land slug, a terrestrial pulmonate gastropod mollusc in the family Agriolimacidae. This species is an important agricultural pest.

== Distribution ==
Deroceras reticulatum is native to Europe, North Africa and the Atlantic Islands. It occurs widely in Europe, but is more rare and restricted to cultivated fields in the southeast, particularly in the Balkans, and is probably absent from Greece and the Bulgarian mountains. In the north and central European lowlands, Great Britain, and Ireland, it is probably the most widely occurring slug. In northern Scandinavia it is scarce, and is mainly found as a synanthrope.

This species occurs in countries and islands including:

- Great Britain
- Ireland
- Austria
- Spain
- Bulgaria
- Czech Republic – least concern (LC)
- Netherlands
- Poland
- Slovakia
- Sweden
- Latvia
- Ukraine

The species has been widely introduced as a synanthrope to many regions:

- North America, in parts of Northern Michigan and Southern Michigan as well as Kentucky
- Canada
- Colombia
- Peru
- Argentina – major slug pest in Buenos Aires province
- Saint Helena
- Tasmania
- New Zealand
- central Asia

== Description ==
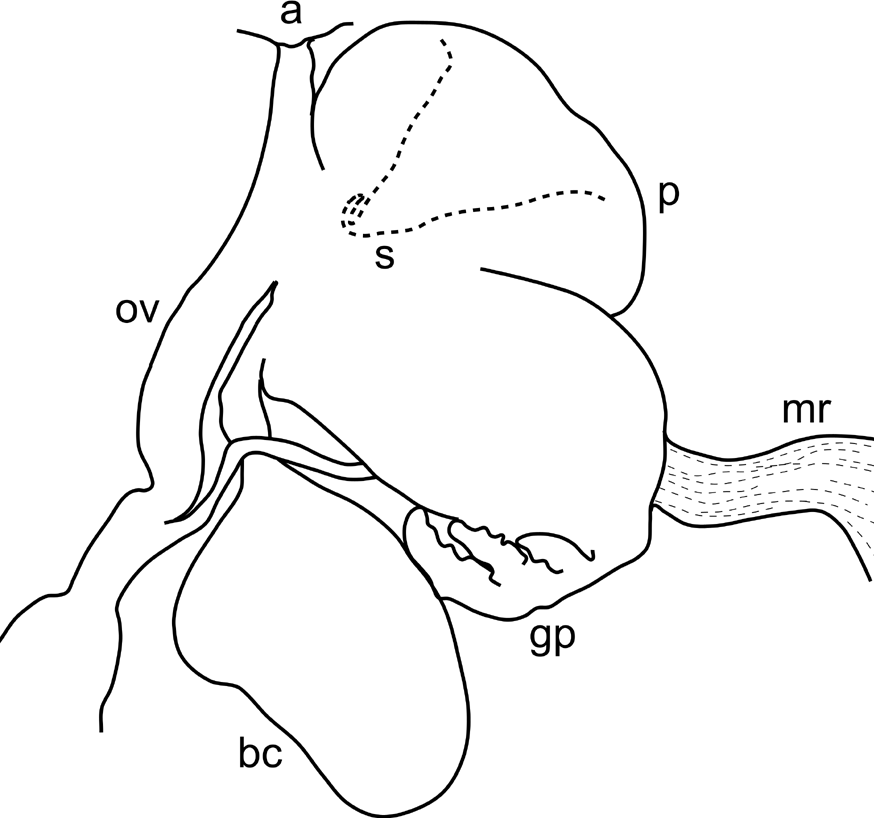
Drawing of the reproductive system of Deroceras reticulatum. a – atrium p – penis s – stimulator mr – musculus retractor penis gp – glandula penis bc – bursa copulatrix ov – oviductus.

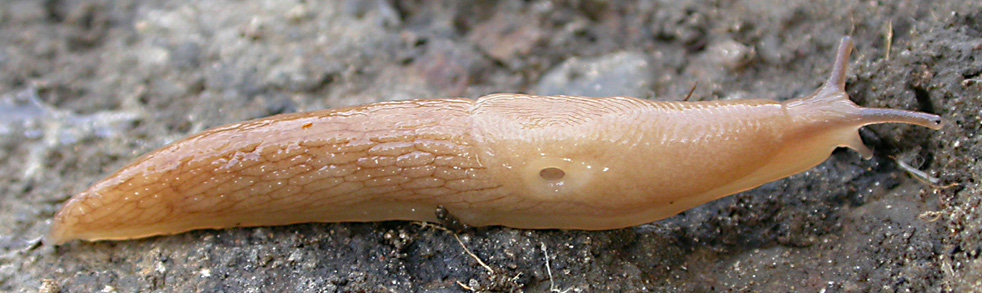
Deroceras reticulatum

As all other Deroceras it has a short keel at the back of the body. Deroceras reticulatum is very variable in colour, creamy or light coffee cream, rarely blackish spotted (slugs with spots may appear blackish). Behind the mantle there is the dark spots form a reticulate pattern. The skin is thick. Mucus is colourless, on irritation milky white. The slug cannot be distinguished from many other Deroceras species based only on its external appearance.

This slug can be up to 40–60 mm long (preserved 25–30 mm). The size varies according to the habitat.

Reproductive system: Penis is fleshy and with a silky sheen, in the shape of an irregular sac, in fully mature specimens divided into 2 parts by a deep lateral constriction. Penial gland has very variable shape, usually a few branches or a single long branch. Stimulator is large, conical and narrow. Retractor of the penis is inserted laterally. Vas deferens opens into penis wall facing the external body side. Rectal caecum is large.

This slug can travel up to 40 feet (12.2 m) in one night.

== Ecology ==
=== Habitat ===
Deroceras reticulatum is almost exclusively restricted to cultivated areas, usually in open habitats, in meadows, near roadsides, in ruins, gardens and parks, not inside forests. External appearance is very similar to Deroceras rodnae, Deroceras praecox and the internal anatomy is very similar to Deroceras turcicum, but those three species lives in natural habitats – in woods – and they co-occur with Deroceras reticulatum very rarely. It shelters under stones and ground litter (It does not burrow into the soil). It is active at night.

=== Feeding habits ===
This species is omnivorous, feeding mainly on fresh leaves and fruits or seedings. Deroceras reticulatum is a serious pest of agricultural crops, garden cultivations and horticulture. After several years with continuous moist weather conditions abundance can seriously increase.

=== Life cycle ===
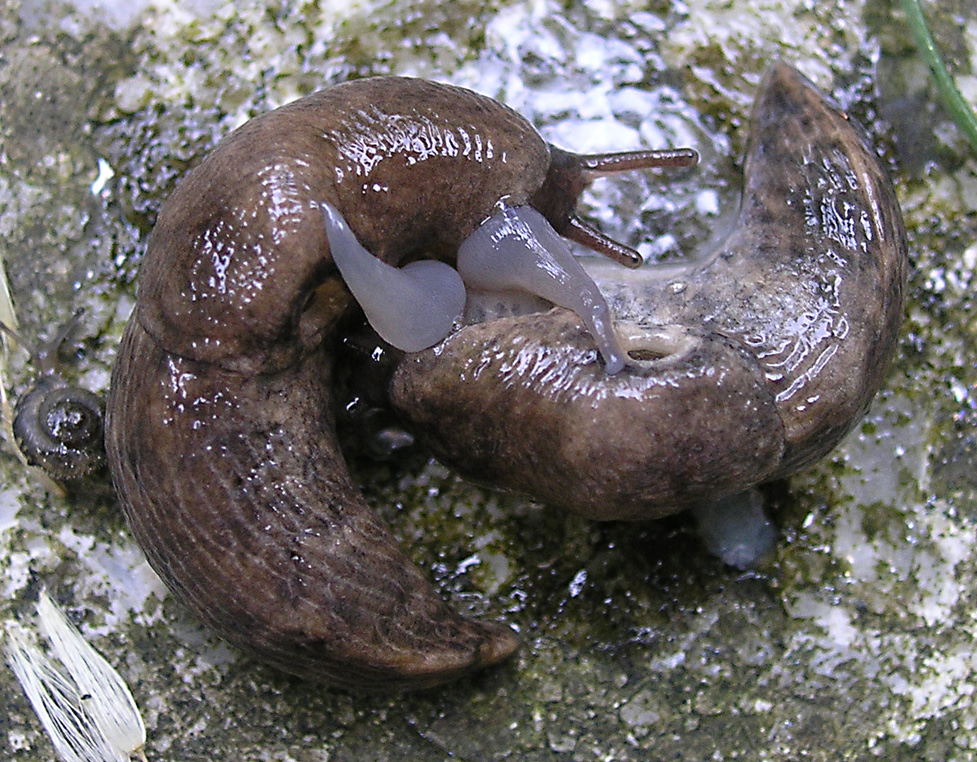
A mating pair of Deroceras reticulatum

Life cycle covers a few months, usually two generations. The main reproductive phase is in summer and autumn. It lays hundreds of eggs which hatch during early summer.

Maximum age is about a year. Slugs die at the first frosts. Usually only eggs hibernate, sometimes also juveniles.

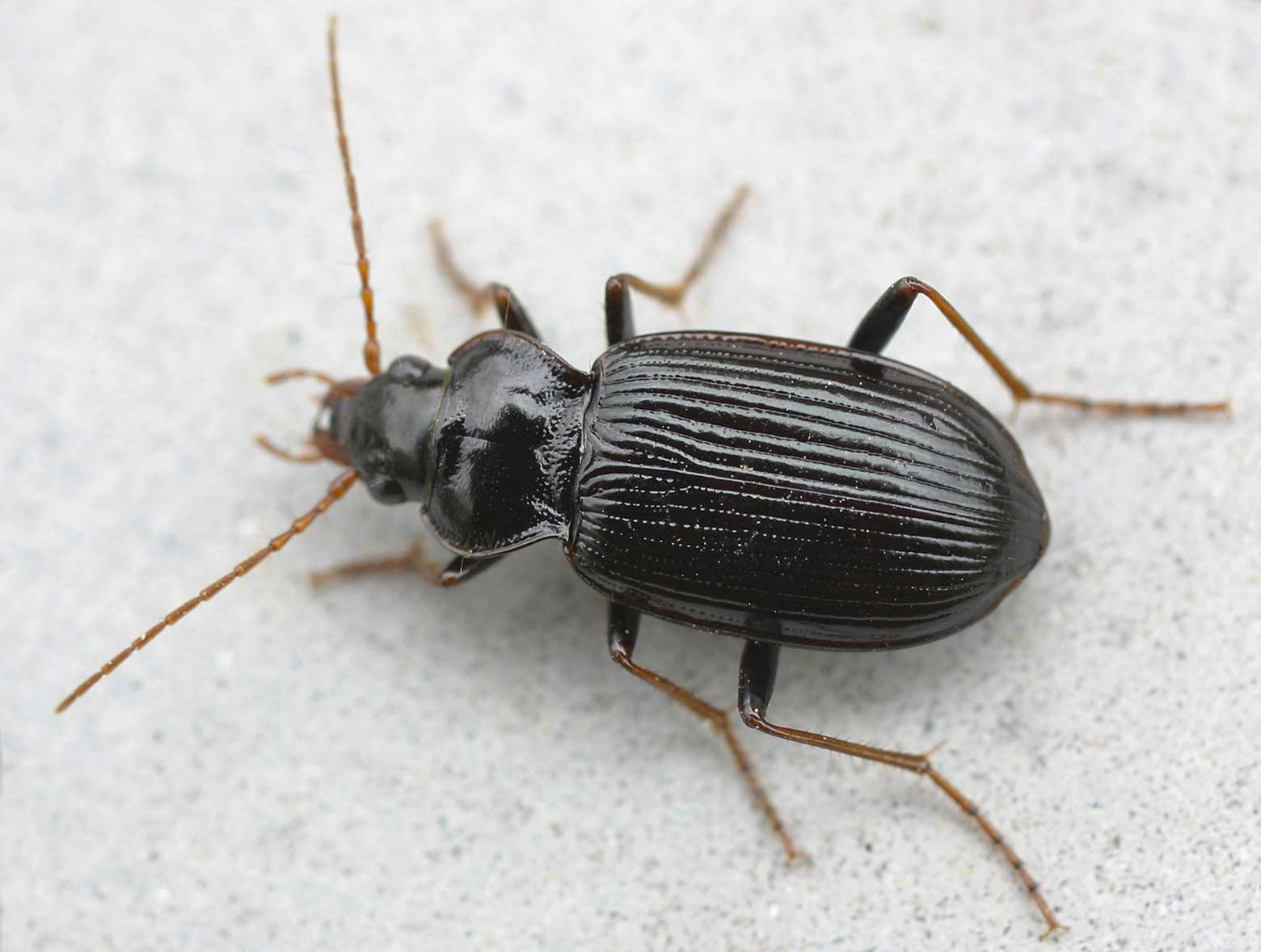
Nebria brevicollis, and numerous other kinds of carabid beetles, feed on this slug species

=== Predators ===
Various carabid beetles are predators of Deroceras reticlatum, including:

- the European garden beetle Carabus nemoralis, is a beneficial predator (from the human perspective) because it eats the young of this species and also their eggs.
- Pterostichus melanarius
- Pterostichus madidus
- Nebria brevicollis
- Scarites anthracinus eats eggs and slugs in Argentina.
- Poecilus cupreus

=== Parasites ===
The bacterium Moraxella osloensis is a mutualistic symbiont of the slug-parasitic nematode Phasmarhabditis hermaphrodita. In nature, Phasmarhabditis hermaphrodita vectors Moraxella osloensis into the shell cavity of the slug host Deroceras reticulatum in which the bacteria multiply and kill the slug.

Deroceras reticulatum can transfer Escherichia coli on its body surface.

Parasites of Deroceras reticulatum include:

- Parelaphostrongylus tenuis
