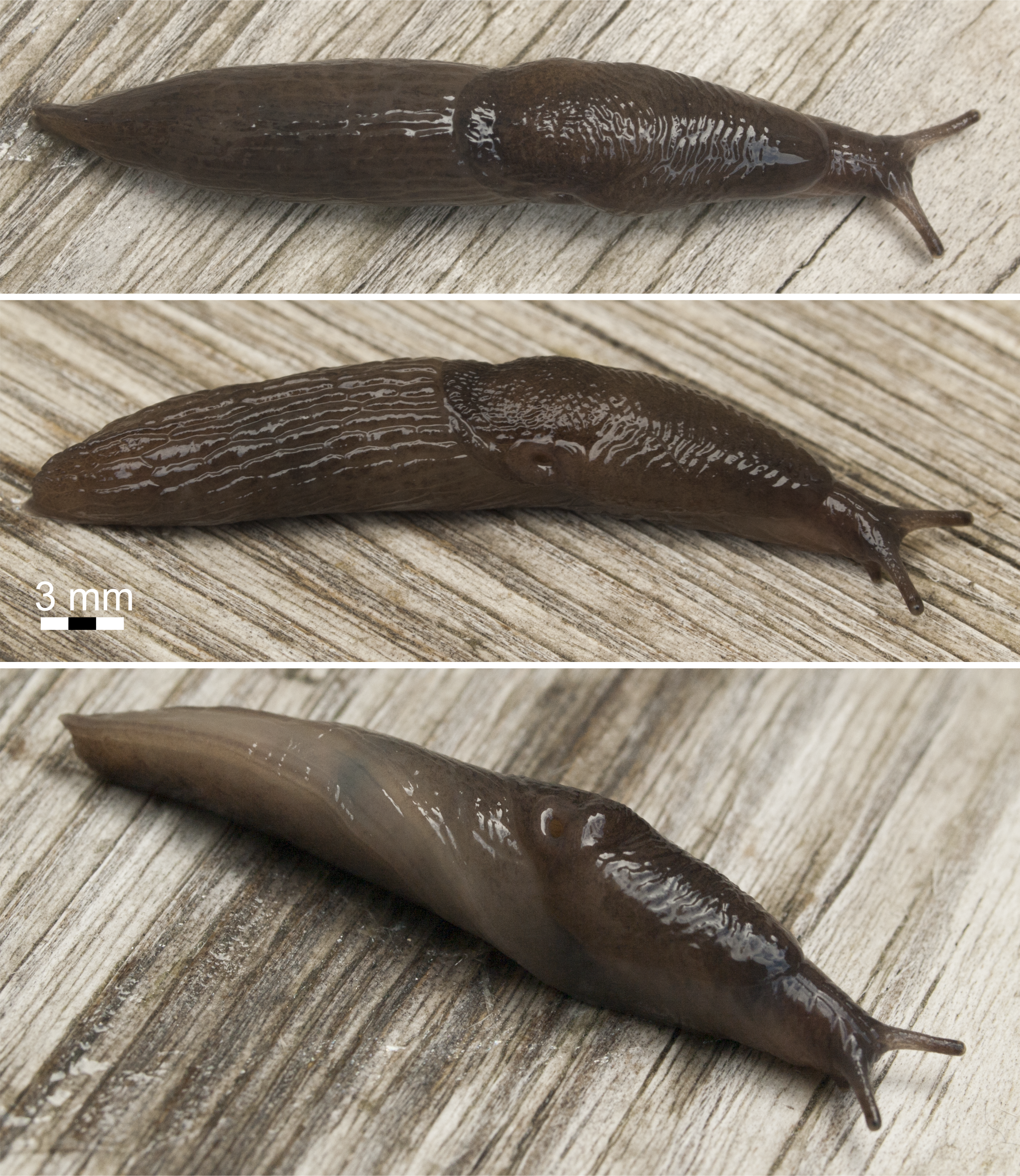
- Three views of the same animal

Scientific classification
- Kingdom: Animalia
- Phylum: Mollusca
- Class: Gastropoda
- Order: Stylommatophora
- Family: Agriolimacidae
- Genus: Deroceras
- Species: D. cecconii

Binomial name
- Deroceras cecconii (Pollonera, 1896)

= Deroceras cecconii =

Species of gastropod

Deroceras cecconii is a species of air-breathing land slug, a terrestrial pulmonate gastropod mollusc in the family Agriolimacidae. Although it was long considered a synonym of Deroceras panormitanum, a 2020 article establishes that it is a distinct species widely distributed in the central part of the Italian peninsula. It is also known as an introduction at one site in eastern Germany.

== Taxonomic history ==
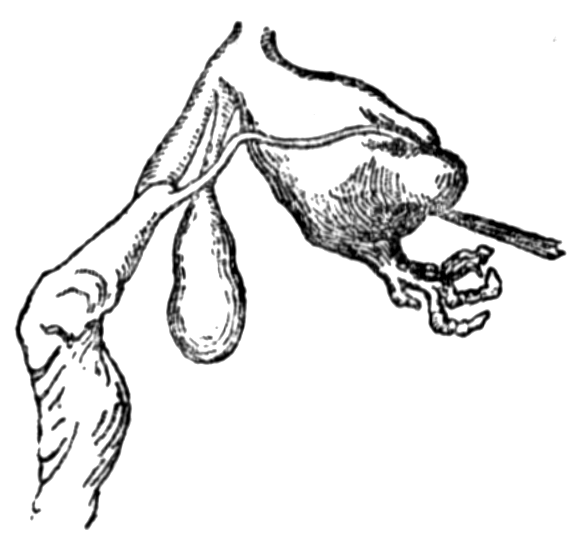
Genitalia figured in the original description

In 1896, Carlo Pollonera described the slug species ″Agriolimax Cecconii″ on the basis of material supplied to him by the entomologist Giacomo Cecconi (1866–1941). Cecconi found the species where he worked in the forest of Vallombrosa in the hills east of Florence, Italy. Subsequent 20th-century workers considered the description inadequate or that the name should be considered a synonym of Deroceras panormitanum. More recently it was recognised that the latter name had been applied to more than one species. New collections from the type locality of D. cecconii have now established that the animals described and figured by Pollonera are indeed distinct, based on mitochondrial DNA sequences and mating behaviour as well as genital anatomy.

Pollonera also described a subspecies ″Agriolimax cecconii var. ilvatica″ from the island of Elba, differing in its genital anatomy. The status of this taxon is unclear.

== Description ==
Penis of D. cecconii

Genitalia of D. cecconii: bc = bursa copulatrix; c = penial caecum; fo = free oviduct; gp = position of genital pore; lo = penial lobe; pg = penial glands; r = penial retractor muscle; s = part of penis containing sarcobelum; so = sperm-oviduct

Adults are of the order of 3 cm long. The skin is thin and fairly transparent, often blackish, but brown and pale forms also occur. The mucus is colourless. Thus the external appearance is similar to that of various other Deroceras species, such as D. invadens, D. panormitanum and D. sturanyi. An indicative but not consistent distinguishing character is a ″pinched″ appearance of the tip of the tail in D. cecconii.

Like with other Deroceras species, reliable identification requires dissecting the animal to reveal the penis. The most prominent features of the penis are the penial glands, which sit on a substantial trunk, and the penial lobe (a blind-ended pocket). Between these structures lies an indented saddle near where the vas deferens inserts. This indentation to the profile of the penis distinguishes D. cecconii from D. golcheri. The penial caecum is often just a swelling, much less prominent than that of D. invadens or D. panormitanum.

== Distribution and ecology ==
Deroceras cecconii occurs widely in the central part of the Italian peninsula, including at one locality in the Republic of San Marino. Also one population, presumably an introduction, lies 700 km to the north in the town of Ostritz on the eastern border of Germany. The species typically is found under discarded rubbish and in leaf litter, in both synanthropic habitats and natural woodland. It often co-occurs with D. invadens.

Deroceras cecconii is known to be adult in spring; its growth rate in the laboratory suggests that it may go through several generations in a year.
