= Deroceras hesperium =

Scientific classification
- Kingdom: Animalia
- Phylum: Mollusca
- Class: Gastropoda
- Order: Stylommatophora
- Family: Agriolimacidae
- Genus: Deroceras
- Species: D. hesperium

Binomial name
- Deroceras hesperium Pilsbry, 1944

Species of gastropod

Deroceras hesperium, common name the evening fieldslug, is a species of air-breathing land slug, a terrestrial pulmonate gastropod mollusk in the family Agriolimacidae.

== Distribution ==
Deroceras hesperium was described by Henry A. Pilsbry from slugs collected at Oswego, Oregon. Later (1948), Pilsbry elaborated on the type locality and stated it as "a small island in Oswego Lake, Oswego, Clackamas County, Oregon. In the same publication, he added additional Oregon records and mentioned a collection of slugs found in 1887 from Comox, Vancouver Island, British Columbia.

== Conservation status ==
This species was assessed as "Data Deficient" (DD) by the Committee on the Status of Endangered Wildlife in Canada (COSEWIC). In the Northwestern US, this formerly common species has declined by 50-75% and is now "truly rare" according to the 2004 Survey and Manage species assessment. It is now found only in northwestern Oregon, the northern Olympic Peninsula and the northeast coast of Vancouver Island. The US Fish and Wildlife Service recently determined that listing this species as endangered may be warranted due to the present or threatened destruction of its habitat resulting from activities that lower the water table or reduce soil moisture, including spring diversions, grazing, and logging.
