= Deroceras tarracense =

Conservation status
- Near Threatened (IUCN 3.1)

Scientific classification
- Kingdom: Animalia
- Phylum: Mollusca
- Class: Gastropoda
- Order: Stylommatophora
- Family: Agriolimacidae
- Genus: Deroceras
- Species: D. tarracense

Binomial name
- Deroceras tarracense Altena, 1969

Species of gastropod

Deroceras tarracense is a species of terrestrial slugs in the family Agriolimacidae. This species is endemic to Spain, where it occurs abundantly in the Sierra del Montsant, in the province of Tarragona.
