= Deroceras vascoana =

Conservation status
- Near Threatened (IUCN 2.3)

Scientific classification
- Domain: Eukaryota
- Kingdom: Animalia
- Phylum: Mollusca
- Class: Gastropoda
- Order: Stylommatophora
- Family: Agriolimacidae
- Genus: Deroceras
- Species: D. vascoana

Binomial name
- Deroceras vascoana de Winter, 1986

Species of gastropod

Deroceras vascoana is a species of air-breathing land slug in the family Agriolimacidae. It is native to France and Spain.

This slug is pale brown in color. Collected specimens are 2.2 to 3.2 centimetres (0.87 to 1.26 in) long. D. vascoana "is easily recognizable anatomically by the shape and colouration of its penis", a main diagnostic character. The "relatively small" and "bulbous" penis is purple-brown in color at the apex, and the branching penial appendage is white. When disturbed, the slug produces a copious white mucus.
