= Deroceras rodnae =

Scientific classification
- Domain: Eukaryota
- Kingdom: Animalia
- Phylum: Mollusca
- Class: Gastropoda
- Order: Stylommatophora
- Family: Agriolimacidae
- Genus: Deroceras
- Species: D. rodnae

Binomial name
- Deroceras rodnae Grossu & Lupu, 1965

Species of gastropod

Deroceras rodnae is a species of air-breathing land slug, a terrestrial pulmonate gastropod mollusk in the family Agriolimacidae.

== Taxonomy ==
Deroceras rodnae was originally described from the Rodna Mountains in Romania by Romanian malacologists Alexandru Vasile Grossu and Dochiţa Lupu in 1965. The figure in the original description is inadequate, but Wiktor (1973) inspected the type specimen and found it to agree with one of the forms of Deroceras praecox that he had described at about the same time (Wiktor, 1966). The name Deroceras rodnae has priority for that form and Deroceras praecox is now restricted to a form with a curved pocket at the end of the penis.

Recently Hutchinson & Reise (2009) showed that western populations of Deroceras rodnae mate in a way so incompatible with that of populations from the east that they must be different species. The morphological differences in preserved specimens are subtle but molecular analyses have confirmed this distinction. Deroceras juranum Wüthrich, 1993 is the appropriate name to use for these western populations from the Alps and Germany.

Deroceras rodnae s.s. shows considerable interpopulation variation in its genital morphology. For instance, in the Lesser Fatra Mountains (Malá Fatra) of Slovakia is a form with a long sarcobelum which Mácha (1981) described as a new species Deroceras fatrense but which Wiktor (2000) synonymised with Deroceras rodnae. It remains debatable whether Deroceras praecox might also be viewed as merely another such subspecific form. Note that the clear differences in mating behaviour between Deroceras praecox and Deroceras rodnae reported by Reise (1995) now turn out to refer to differences between Deroceras praecox and Deroceras juranum.

== Distribution ==
Deroceras rodnae s.l. has been reported from Romania, Ukraine, Slovakia, Poland, Czech Republic, Hungary, Austria, Switzerland, Germany, Croatia, and France. However, these and most other published data concern Deroceras rodnae s. l.; that is they do not distinguish Deroceras rodnae s. s. and Deroceras juranum (see above). The type locality is in Romania and Hutchinson & Reise (2009) confirmed the occurrence of Deroceras rodnae s. s. from Poland, Slovakia and Hungary, proposing that all Deroceras rodnae s. l. occurring east of the range of D. praecox (which is distributed around the Sudeten mountains) were this species. However, they also report an occurrence of Deroceras rodnae s. s. in Croatia and discuss a form of uncertain status in the uplands south of Dresden, Germany. They questioned identifications of Deroceras rodnae s. l. from Spain and Italy.
