= Furcopenis =

Scientific classification
- Domain: Eukaryota
- Kingdom: Animalia
- Phylum: Mollusca
- Class: Gastropoda
- Order: Stylommatophora
- Family: Agriolimacidae
- Genus: Furcopenis; Castillejo & Wiktor, 1983

Genus of slugs

Furcopenis is a genus of gastropods belonging to the family Agriolimacidae.

The species of this genus are found in Pyrenees.

Species:

- Furcopenis circularis Castillejo & Mascato, 1987
- Furcopenis darioi Castillejo & Wiktor, 1983
- Furcopenis gallaeciensis Castillejo & Wiktor, 1983
- Furcopenis geresiensis (Rodríguez, Castillejo & Outeiro, 1989)
