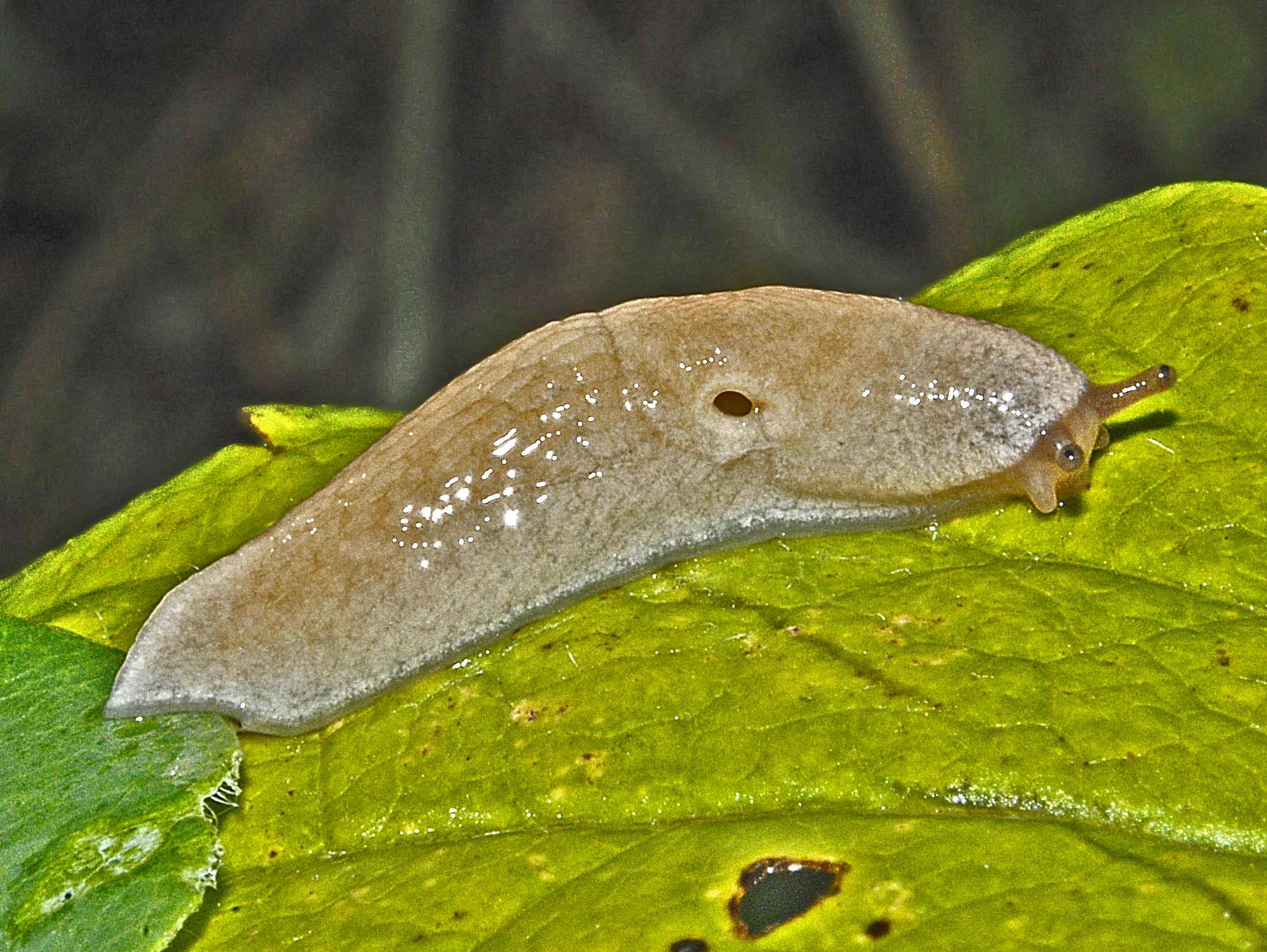
- Deroceras cf. agreste
- Drawing of Deroceras agreste

Scientific classification
- Kingdom: Animalia
- Phylum: Mollusca
- Class: Gastropoda
- Order: Stylommatophora
- Family: Agriolimacidae
- Genus: Deroceras
- Species: D. agreste

Binomial name
- Deroceras agreste (Linnaeus, 1758)

= Deroceras agreste =

Species of gastropod

Deroceras agreste is a species of air-breathing land slug in the family Agriolimacidae. Its common names include field slug, grey field slug, milky slug, and northern field slug.

== Description ==
This slug is up to 5 centimeters long. It is pale brown, tan, "buff or oatmeal-coloured", with a darker head and tentacles. There are no obvious body markings. The sole of the foot is white. The mucus is clear, but when disturbed, the sole produces a white mucus.

This species lives in moist grassy and marshy habitat types. It feeds on dead and living plant material, and is sometimes an agricultural pest on crops such as lettuce. Its lifespan is about one year.

== Distribution ==
This species is native to Asia and northern and central Europe.
