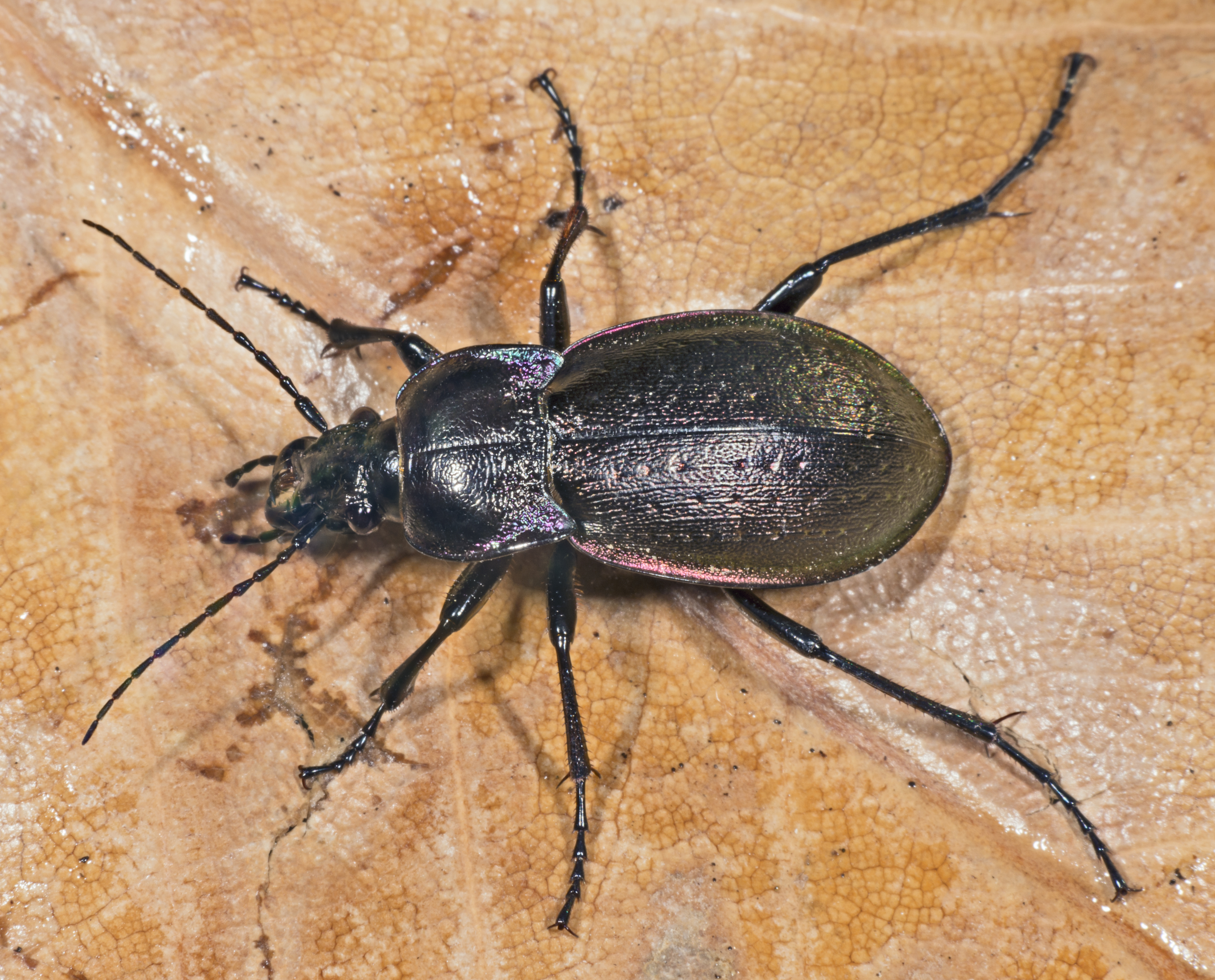

Scientific classification
- Kingdom: Animalia
- Phylum: Arthropoda
- Clade: Pancrustacea
- Class: Insecta
- Order: Coleoptera
- Suborder: Adephaga
- Family: Carabidae
- Genus: Carabus
- Species: C. nemoralis

Binomial name
- Carabus nemoralis O. F. Müller, 1764

Synonyms
- Carabus waltersachi Mandl, 1984; Carabus freneyi Tarrier, 1975; Carabus montisdiniensis Tarrier, 1975; Carabus fayardensis P.Machard, 1974; Archicarabus aubersoni Raynaud, 1973; Archicarabus borealensis Raynaud, 1973; Archicarabus miolansicus Tarrier, 1965; Archicarabus colasi Bourgin, 1963; Carabus pseudomontivagus Mandl, 1961; Carabus verdonensis Puisségur, 1961; Carabus nigrotinctus Mandl, 1955; Carabus nicollei Bourgin, 1947; Carabus lestagei Basilewsky, 1930; Carabus auratus Heuer, 1926; Carabus brunnipes Lapouge, 1908; Carabus canadensis Lapouge, 1908; Carabus deletus Lapouge, 1908; Carabus lucidus Lapouge, 1908; Carabus krasae Roubal, 1903; Carabus tristis Dalla Torre, 1877; Carabus nigrescens Letzner, 1850; Carabus virescens Letzner, 1850; Buprestis foetens Voet, 1778; Carabus manae Devecis, 1996; Carabus layrei Tarrier, 1975; Carabus litigiosus Tarrier, 1975; Archicarabus venustus Raynaud, 1973; Carabus cantalicus Jeanne, 1971; Carabus indigotinctus Codina, 1927; Carabus meridianus Csiki, 1927; Carabus setosus Lapouge, 1910; Carabus atavus Lapouge, 1908; Carabus discolor Lapouge, 1908; Carabus meridionalis Lapouge, 1908; Carabus pascuorum Lapouge, 1908; Carabus quinqueseriatus Lapouge, 1908; Carabus kraatzianus Beuthin, 1889; Carabus nisseni Beuthin, 1889; Carabus pulcherrimus Beuthin, 1889; Carabus contractus Géhin, 1885

= Carabus nemoralis =

Species of beetle

Carabus nemoralis (commonly called the "Bronze carabid") is a ground beetle common in central and northern Europe, as well as Iceland and Canada. While native to Europe, it has been introduced to and is expanding its range throughout North America. It is 20-25mm long and found in many habitats in Great Britain.

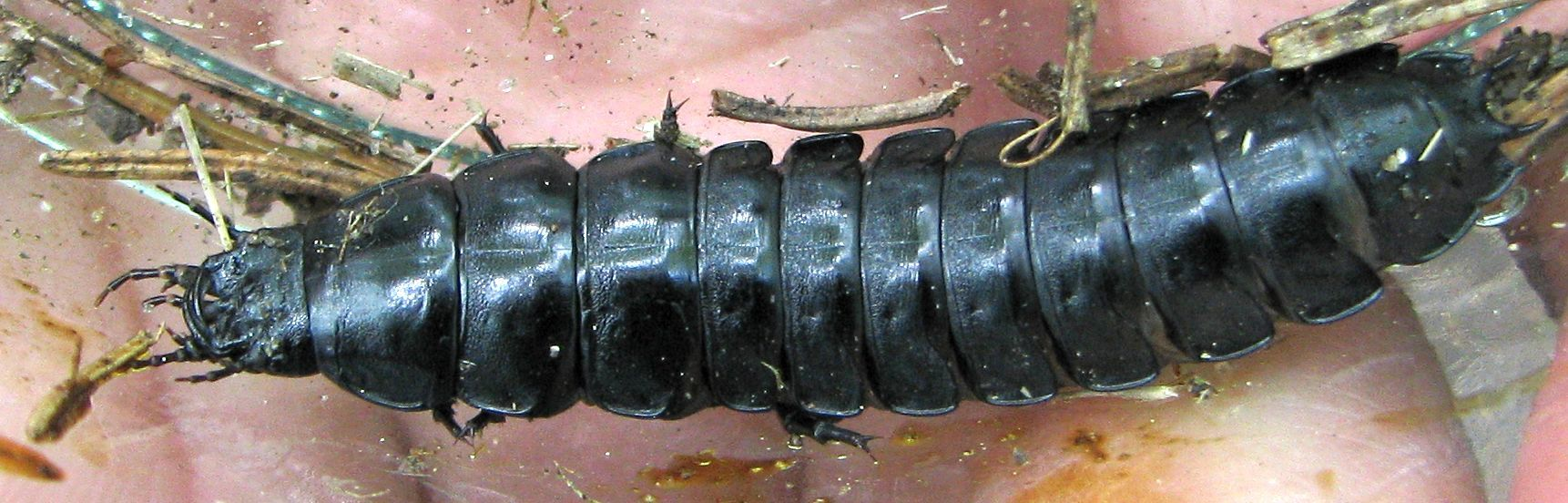
Larva

== Ecology ==
=== Feeding habits ===
Carabus nemoralis is a beneficial predator as it eats the agricultural pest Deroceras reticulatum slug in its young stage and also its eggs. Use of Carabus nemoralis as a biocontrol agent for multiple pests in large scale farming operations have been tested in recent years. Larvae are voracious hunters, resembling rove beetles. They can be found preying on annelids and slugs during early summer months.

== Defensive adaptations ==
It is known that some Carabus nemoralis populations will regurgitate foul-smelling brownish-red liquid as a defense mechanism against predators. Specimens can also fire fecal matter at high speed to a considerable distance, if picked up or otherwise threatened.

== Reproduction ==
Carabus nemoralis typically has one breeding period in the spring with eggs hatching in autumn of the same year. The adults are found all year-round in many habitats.

== Subspecies ==
- Carabus nemoralis nemoralis (Ireland, Great Britain, Denmark, Norway, Sweden, Finland, France, Belgium, Netherlands, Germany, Switzerland, Austria, Czechia, Slovakia, Hungary, Poland, Estonia, Latvia, Lithuania, Belarus, Ukraine, Italy, Slovenia, Croatia, Bosnia-Herzegovina, former Yugoslavia, Moldova, Kazakhstan, Kyrgyzstan, New Zealand, Canada, Russia)
- Carabus nemoralis lamadridae Born, 1895 (Spain)
- Carabus nemoralis prasinotinctus Heyden, 1880 (France, Spain)
