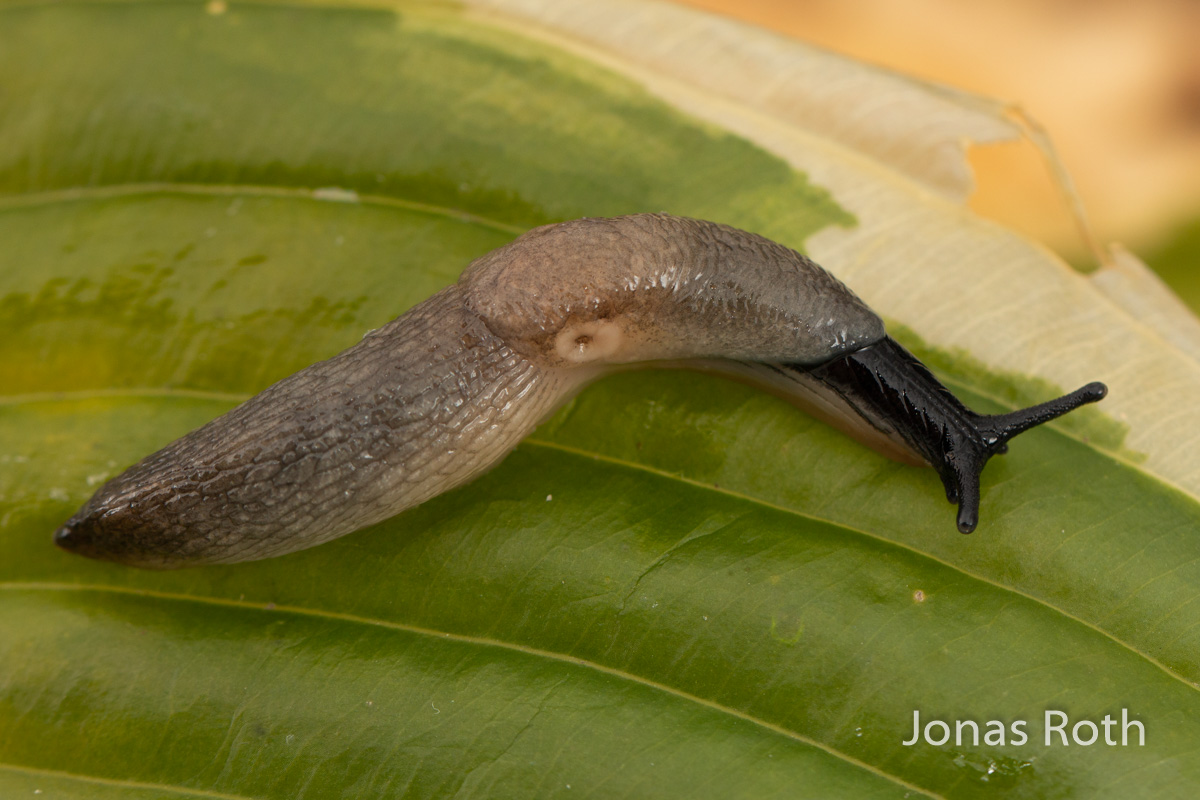
- Krynickillus melanocephalus

Scientific classification
- Domain: Eukaryota
- Kingdom: Animalia
- Phylum: Mollusca
- Class: Gastropoda
- Order: Stylommatophora
- Family: Agriolimacidae
- Genus: Krynickillus; Kaleniczenko, 1851

= Krynickillus =

Genus of slugs

Krynickillus is a genus of slugs belonging to the family Agriolimacidae. The species of this genus are found in Europe and West Asia.

== Species ==
There are six species:

- Krynickillus cyrniacus Mabille, 1868
- Krynickillus dymczeviczii Kaleniczenko, 1851
- Krynickillus eichwaldii Kaleniczenko, 1851
- Krynickillus hoplites (Simroth, 1899)
- Krynickillus melanocephalus Kaleniczenko, 1851
- Krynickillus urbanskii (Wiktor, 1971)

The first three are considered taxa inquirenda.
