= Mesolimax =

Scientific classification
- Kingdom: Animalia
- Phylum: Mollusca
- Class: Gastropoda
- Order: Stylommatophora
- Family: Agriolimacidae
- Genus: Mesolimax; Pollonera, 1888

Genus of slugs

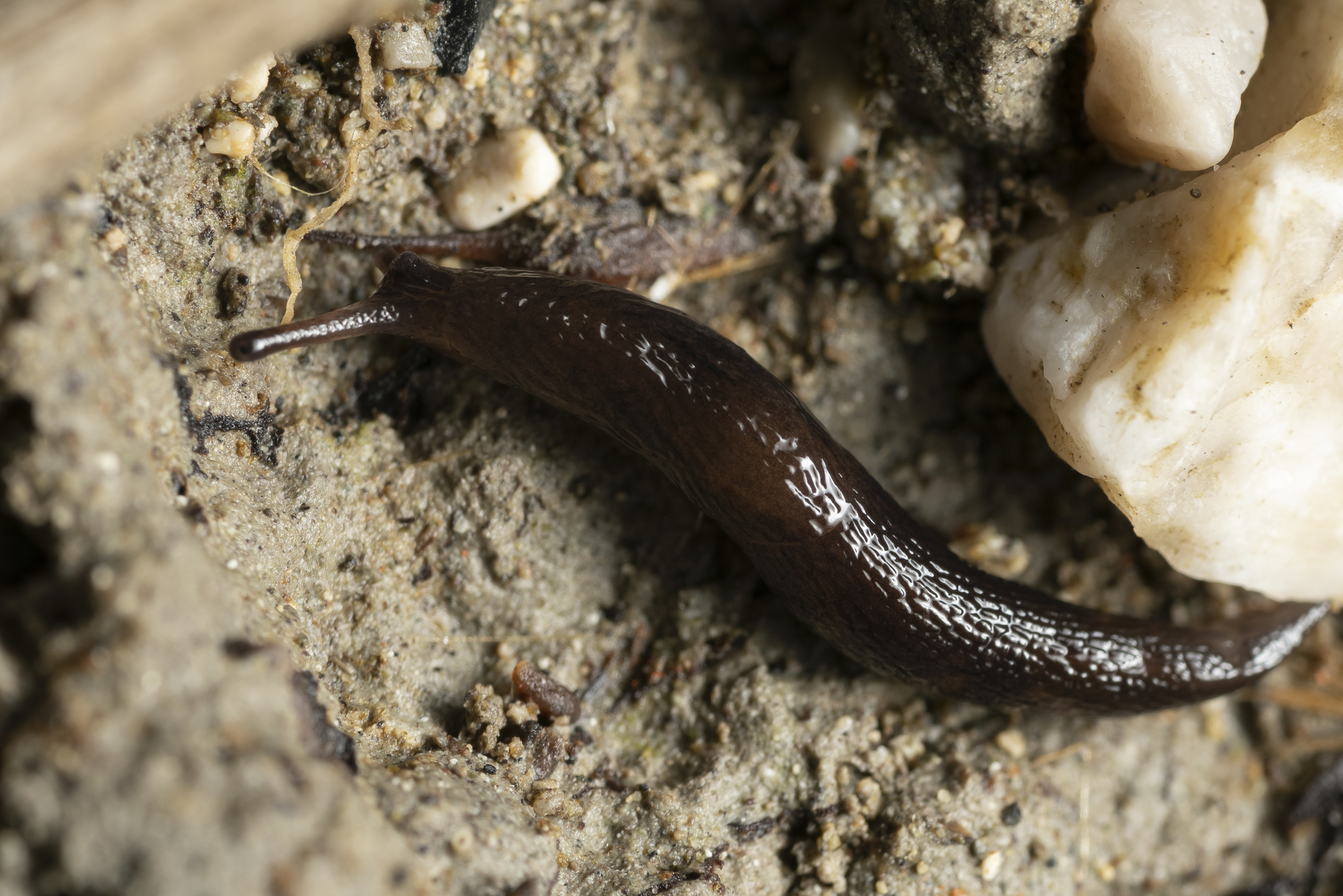
Mesolimax brauni in Greece

Mesolimax is a genus of gastropods belonging to the family Agriolimacidae.

The species of this genus are found in Aegean Sea.

Species:

- Mesolimax brauni Pollonera, 1888
- Mesolimax escherichi Simroth, 1899
