= Deroceras fatrense =

Conservation status
- Data Deficient (IUCN 2.3)

Scientific classification
- Domain: Eukaryota
- Kingdom: Animalia
- Phylum: Mollusca
- Class: Gastropoda
- Order: Stylommatophora
- Family: Agriolimacidae
- Genus: Deroceras
- Species: D. fatrense

Binomial name
- Deroceras fatrense Mácha, 1981

Species of gastropod

Deroceras fatrense is a species of air-breathing land slug, a terrestrial pulmonate gastropod mollusk in the family Agriolimacidae.

This species is endemic to Slovakia.
