= Megalopelte =

Scientific classification
- Kingdom: Animalia
- Phylum: Mollusca
- Class: Gastropoda
- Order: Stylommatophora
- Family: Agriolimacidae
- Genus: Megalopelte; Lindholm, 1914
- Species: M. simrothi

Binomial name
- Megalopelte simrothi Lindholm, 1914

Genus of slugs

Megalopelte is a monotypic genus of gastropods belonging to the family Agriolimacidae. The only species is Megalopelte simrothi.

The species is found in the Caucasus.
