= Deroceras turcicum =

Scientific classification
- Kingdom: Animalia
- Phylum: Mollusca
- Class: Gastropoda
- Order: Stylommatophora
- Family: Agriolimacidae
- Genus: Deroceras
- Species: D. turcicum

Binomial name
- Deroceras turcicum (Simroth, 1894)

Species of gastropod

Deroceras turcicum is a species of air-breathing land slug, a terrestrial pulmonate gastropod mollusc in the family Agriolimacidae.

== Distribution ==
It is found in Turkey and the more south eastern parts of Europe (Albania, Austria, Bulgaria, Greece, Hungary, Italy, Romania, countries of the area of the former Yugoslavia), extending as far north as the Czech Republic, Slovakia, Poland and Ukraine.
