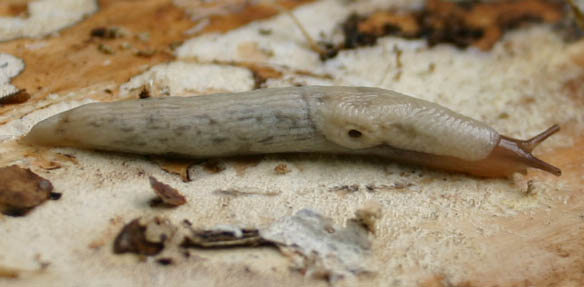

Conservation status
- Least Concern (IUCN 3.1)

Scientific classification
- Kingdom: Animalia
- Phylum: Mollusca
- Class: Gastropoda
- Order: Stylommatophora
- Family: Agriolimacidae
- Genus: Deroceras
- Species: D. praecox

Binomial name
- Deroceras praecox Wiktor, 1966

= Deroceras praecox =

Species of gastropod

Deroceras praecox is a species of small air-breathing land slug, a pulmonate gastropod in the family Agriolimacidae.

== Taxonomy ==
Wiktor's original description of D. praecox in 1966 distinguished two forms on the basis of their genitalia. Later, one of the forms of D. praecox was found to be synonymous with Deroceras rodnae, described by Grossu and Lupu in 1965. Deroceras praecox now refers to the other form, with a spiral end to its penis, which occupies a distinct range in the Sudeten Mountains and neighboring areas. It remains debatable whether D. praecox might be better viewed as a subspecies of D. rodnae. Differences in mating behaviour reported between D. praecox and D. rodnae have turned out to refer to differences between D. praecox and a more distant species, Deroceras juranum.

== Description ==
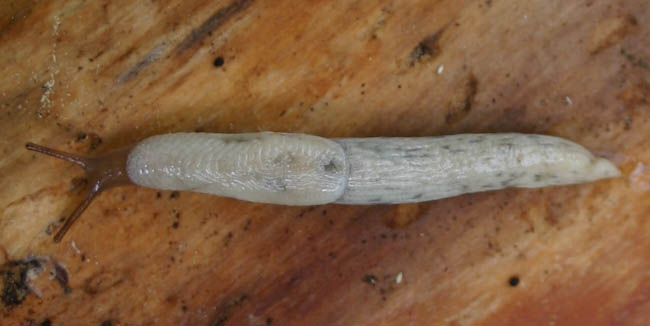
Another view of Deroceras praecox

The slug's body is usually snowy white or off-white mottled with grey. The head and tentacles are brownish. Deroceras praecox may co-occur with externally indistinguishable species such as D. turcicum, with different species at the same site sharing color patterns. Deroceras praecox differs from D. rodnae in having a spiral pocket at the end of its penis.

== Distribution ==
This species inhabits humid areas in Eastern European woodlands, often near bodies of water. It is listed in the IUCN Red List, and is evaluated as a Least-concern species (LC).

It occurs in the Czech Republic, where it is evaluated as near threatened (NT), Poland, and Slovakia, with a range enveloped inside that of D. rodnae. Hybrid zones between these two taxa are known in Poland and Slovakia.

A closely related form of uncertain taxonomic status, which may be conspecific with D. praecox, occurs in the uplands south of Dresden, Germany.
