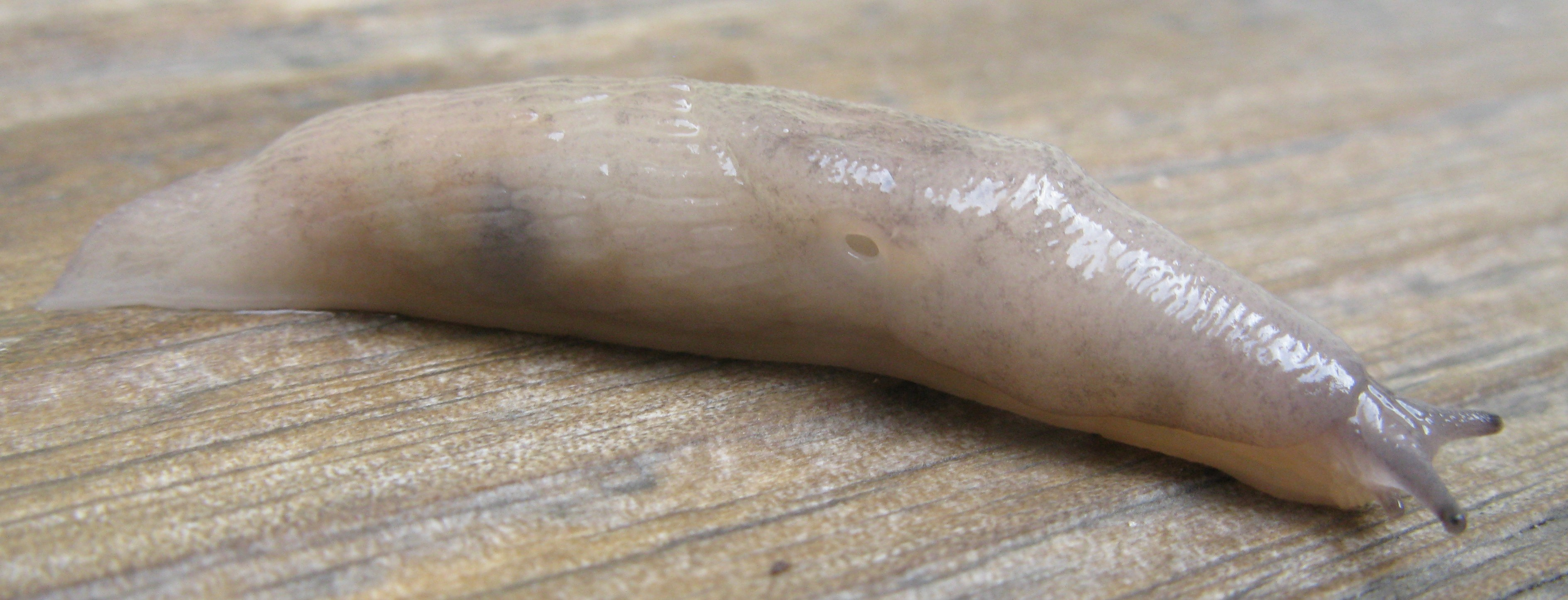

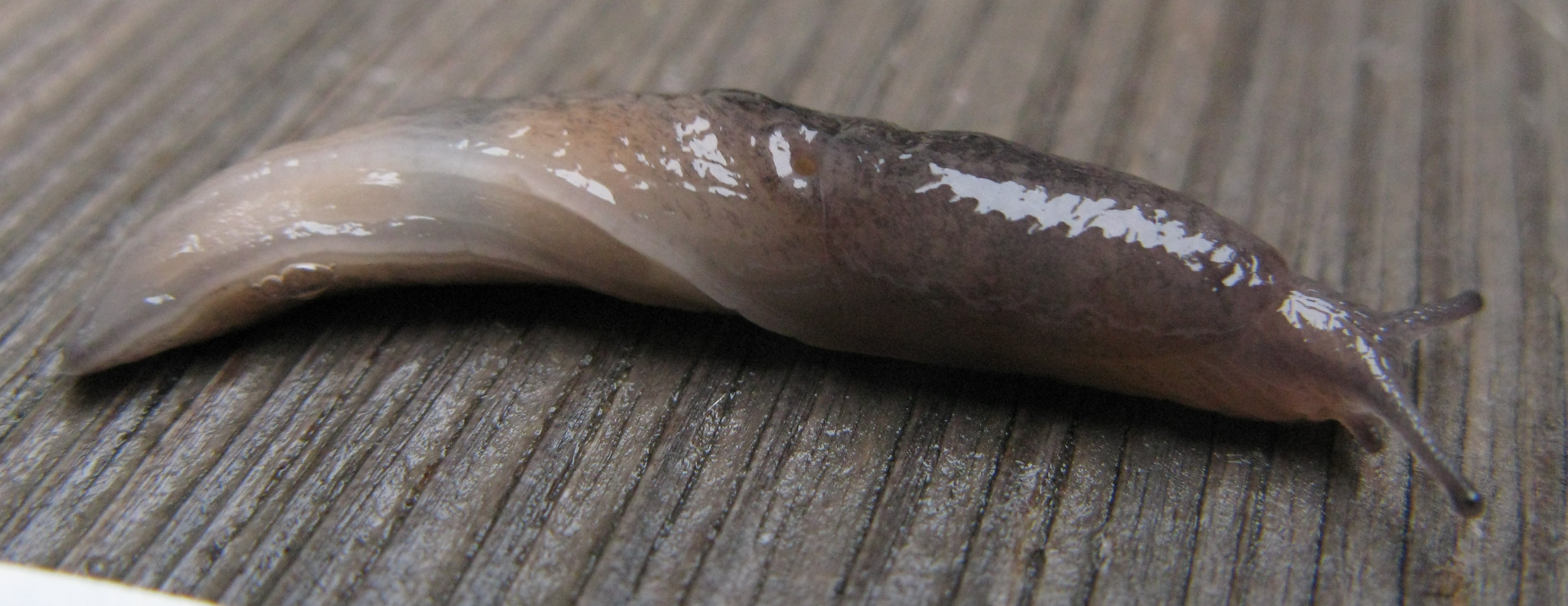
- Deroceras panormitantum from two sites on Sicily

Conservation status
- Least Concern (IUCN 3.1)

Scientific classification
- Kingdom: Animalia
- Phylum: Mollusca
- Class: Gastropoda
- Order: Stylommatophora
- Family: Agriolimacidae
- Genus: Deroceras
- Species: D. panormitanum

Binomial name
- Deroceras panormitanum (Lessona & Pollonera, 1882)

Synonyms
- Deroceras pollonerae Deroceras caruanae Deroceras dubium Deroceras giustianum

= Deroceras panormitanum =

Species of gastropod

Deroceras panormitanum is a species of air-breathing land slug, a terrestrial pulmonate gastropod mollusc in the family Agriolimacidae. Deroceras panormitanum sensu stricto ("in the strict sense") is common on Sicily and Malta, but also occurs sporadically as an introduction elsewhere in Western Europe and Macaronesia. Before 2011, this name was also applied to what turned out to be a distinct species, Deroceras invadens, a species which has spread widely around the world and is often a pest.

== Synonymy ==
Deroceras panormitanum was described from Palermo in Sicily. It is now widely accepted that Deroceras pollonerae also described from Palermo, Deroceras caruanae described from Valletta on Malta, and Deroceras dubium from Malta are the same species. Reise et al. also synonymised Deroceras giustianum from NW Sicily but considered the status of further similar taxa from this general region as uncertain. Now that Deroceras invadens has been recognised as distinct, the morphological variation within Deroceras panormitanum sensu stricto is not as great as once thought.

== Description ==
The skin and flesh of Deroceras panormitanum is watery and fairly transparent. The skin colour varies between pale grey, brown, and black. The mucus is colourless. Externally, Deroceras panormitanum is impossible to distinguish from Deroceras invadens and Deroceras golcheri, which occur in the same islands, and from a variety of other Deroceras species occurring elsewhere.

Internally the penis of Deroceras panormitanum has two side pockets (penial caecum and penial lobe), as in Deroceras invadens but unlike in Deroceras golcheri or related forms on Sicily. In Deroceras panormitanum the caecum is more tapering and pointed than in Deroceras invadens. Whereas in Deroceras invadens the retractor muscle attaches directly to a point on the penis between the caecum and lobe, in Deroceras panormitanum it attaches first to the lobe. Also the penial glands often appear more knobbly than in Deroceras invadens. And inside the penis, between the distal and proximal parts, is a small flap that is absent in other species.

Part of the penis, showing diagnostic characters

Reise et al. detailed the mating behaviour and compared it with that of Deroceras invadens and Deroceras golcheri.

== Distribution ==
On Sicily and Malta this species is widespread and presumed to be native. It has now been recorded also as presumed introductions at one site in northern Italy, on the island of Mallorca, in Estremadura and Ribatejo in mainland Portugal, at two neighbouring sites on Madeira and on produce originating from the Azores, at three sites in France, and within the British Isles at two sites in South Wales, two in England and at one site in Ireland.
