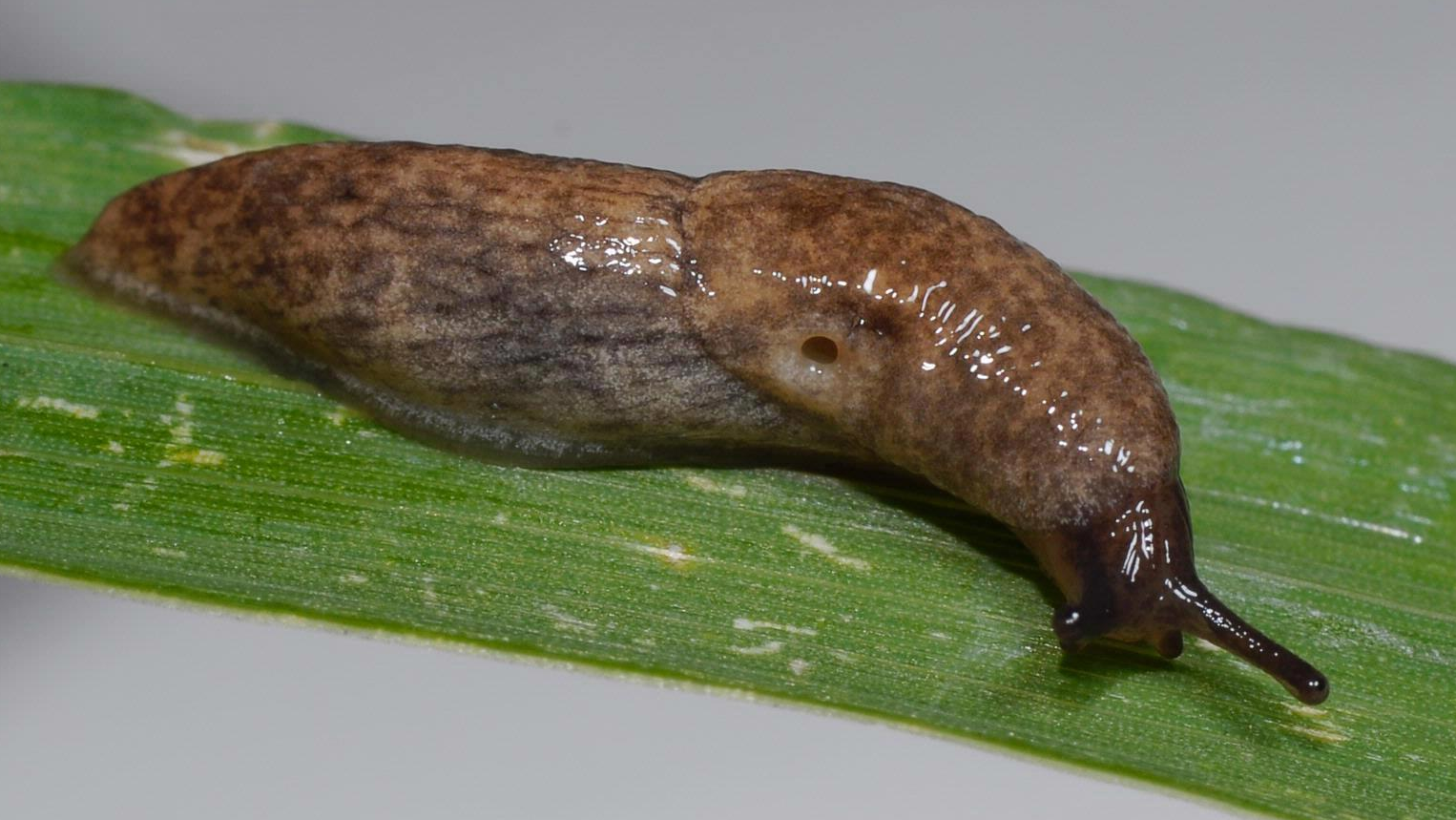
- Deroceras reticulatum

Scientific classification
- Kingdom: Animalia
- Phylum: Mollusca
- Class: Gastropoda
- Order: Stylommatophora
- Family: Agriolimacidae
- Subfamily: Agriolimacinae
- Genus: Deroceras; Rafinesque, 1820

Type species
- Limax gracilis Rafinesque, 1820

Diversity
- 123 species

= Deroceras =

Genus of gastropods

Deroceras is a taxonomic genus of small to medium-sized air-breathing land slugs in the family Agriolimacidae.

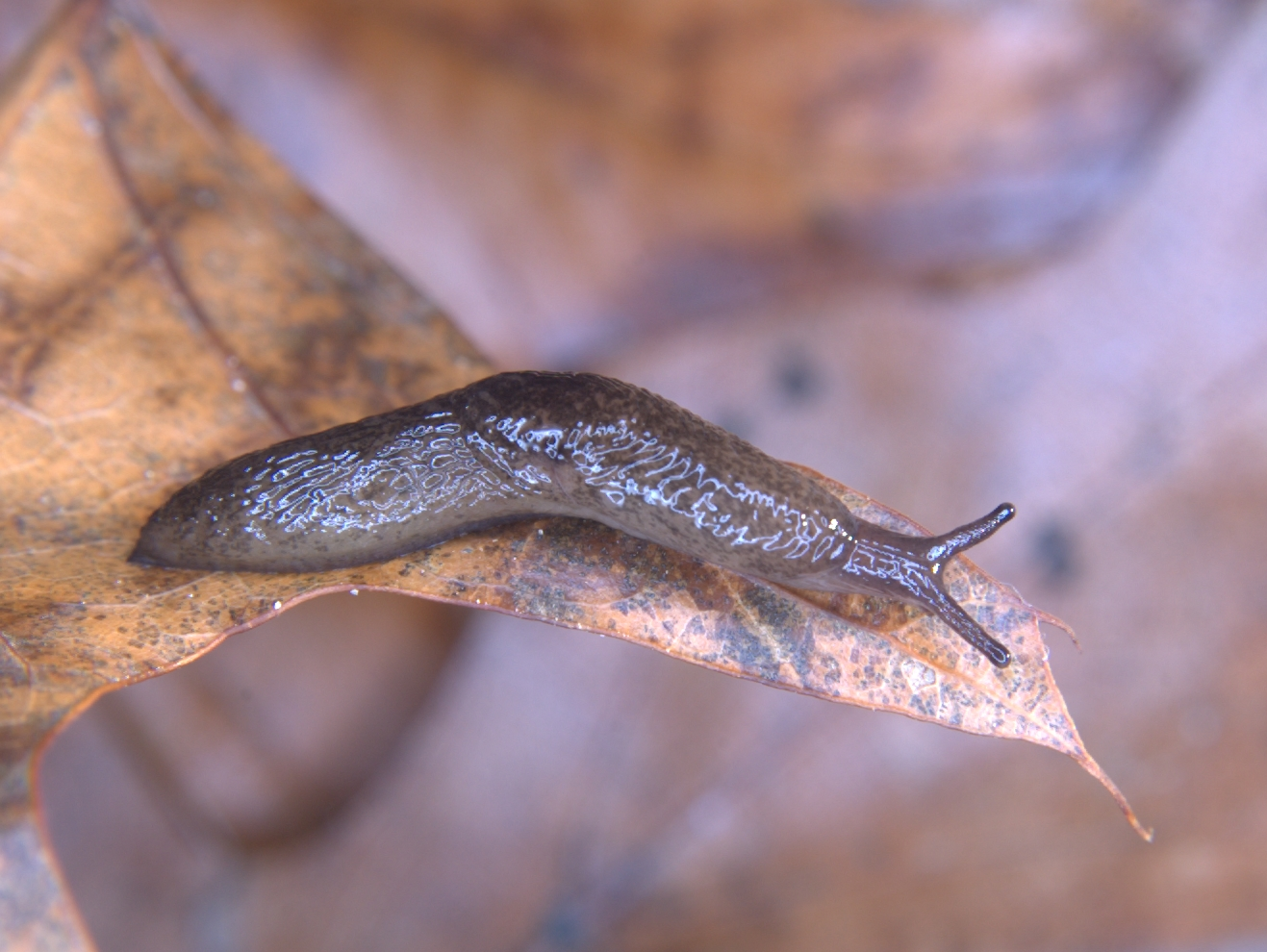
Deroceras panormitanum

== Description ==
Most species reach only 30–35 mm in length (max 45 mm). Coloration varies considerably within and between species but common patterns are pale cream, with or without darker flecks (never stripes), and a more uniform light gray or brown to black-brown. Mucus is usually colourless but in some species includes a white deposit when the slug has been disturbed. No keel continues from the tail along the back. The mantle is large (up to half the body length), containing a shell plate internally. The pneumostome lies in the posterior half of the mantle. Generally external appearance does not reliably distinguish one species from certain others, so species identification requires dissection to reveal the genitalia, unless the local species diversity is known to be low.

The taxonomy, anatomy and other aspects of the biology of this genus were reviewed in 2000, and the diverse mating behaviors were reviewed in 2007.

== Species ==
In 2000, in the most recent monograph on the genus, Wiktor rejected earlier attempts (including his own) at a subgeneric (Agriolimax Mörch, 1865, Plathystimulus Wiktor, 1973) classification, because there appeared to be so many convergences and reversals. The only exception was that he split off Liolytopelte as a subgenus because of its distinctive hard plate within the penis; all other species were included in the subgenus Deroceras.

There are at least 123 species in the genus Deroceras.

Subgenus Deroceras Rafinesque, 1820

- Deroceras abessinicum
- Deroceras adolphi
- Deroceras afer
- Deroceras agreste (Linnaeus, 1758)
- Deroceras altaicum
- Deroceras altimirai
- Deroceras astypalaeensis
- Deroceras bakurianum
- Deroceras barceum
- Deroceras berytensis
- Deroceras bisacchianum
- Deroceras bistimulatum
- Deroceras boeoticum
- Deroceras boettgeri
- Deroceras bulgaricum
- Deroceras cazioti
- Deroceras cecconii
- Deroceras chevallieri
- Deroceras christae
- Deroceras chrysorroyatissensis
- Deroceras concrementosum
- Deroceras cycladicum
- Deroceras dallaii
- Deroceras deckeni
- Deroceras demirtensis
- Deroceras dubium
- Deroceras ercinae
- Deroceras famagustensis
- Deroceras fatrense
- Deroceras gardullanum
- Deroceras gavdosensis
- Deroceras giustianum
- Deroceras glandulosum
- Deroceras golcheri
- Deroceras gorgonium
- Deroceras halieos
- Deroceras helicoidale
- Deroceras hesperium
- Deroceras heterura
- Deroceras ikaria
- Deroceras ilium
- Deroceras invadens
- Deroceras johannae
- Deroceras juranum
- Deroceras karnaniensis
- Deroceras kasium
- Deroceras keaense
- Deroceras klemmi
- Deroceras kontanum
- Deroceras korthionensis
- Deroceras koschanum
- Deroceras kythirensis
- Deroceras laeve (O. F. Müller, 1774)
- Deroceras lasithionensis
- Deroceras levisarcobelum
- Deroceras libanoticum
- Deroceras limacoides
- Deroceras lombricoides
- Deroceras lothari
- Deroceras maasseni
- Deroceras malkini
- Deroceras melinum
- Deroceras minoicum
- Deroceras neuteboomi
- Deroceras nigroclypeatum
- Deroceras nitidum
- Deroceras nyphoni
- Deroceras oertzeni
- Deroceras orduensis
- Deroceras osseticum
- Deroceras padisii
- Deroceras pageti
- Deroceras panormitanum (Lessona & Pollonera, 1882)
- Deroceras parium
- Deroceras parnasium
- Deroceras planarioides
- Deroceras ponsonbyi
- Deroceras praecox
- Deroceras pseudopanormitanum
- Deroceras rethimnonensis
- Deroceras reticulatum (O. F. Müller, 1774)
- Deroceras rhodensis
- Deroceras riedelianum
- Deroceras roblesi
- Deroceras rodnae
- Deroceras samium
- Deroceras seriphium
- Deroceras sturanyi
- Deroceras subagreste
- Deroceras tarracense
- Deroceras tauricum
- Deroceras thersites
- Deroceras turcicum
- Deroceras uataderensis
- Deroceras vascoana
- Deroceras zilchi

Subgenus Liolytopelte Simroth, 1901

- Deroceras bureschi
- Deroceras caucasicum
- Deroceras kandaharensis
- Deroceras moldavicum
- Deroceras occidentalis
- Deroceras trabzonensis

== Relevance to humans ==
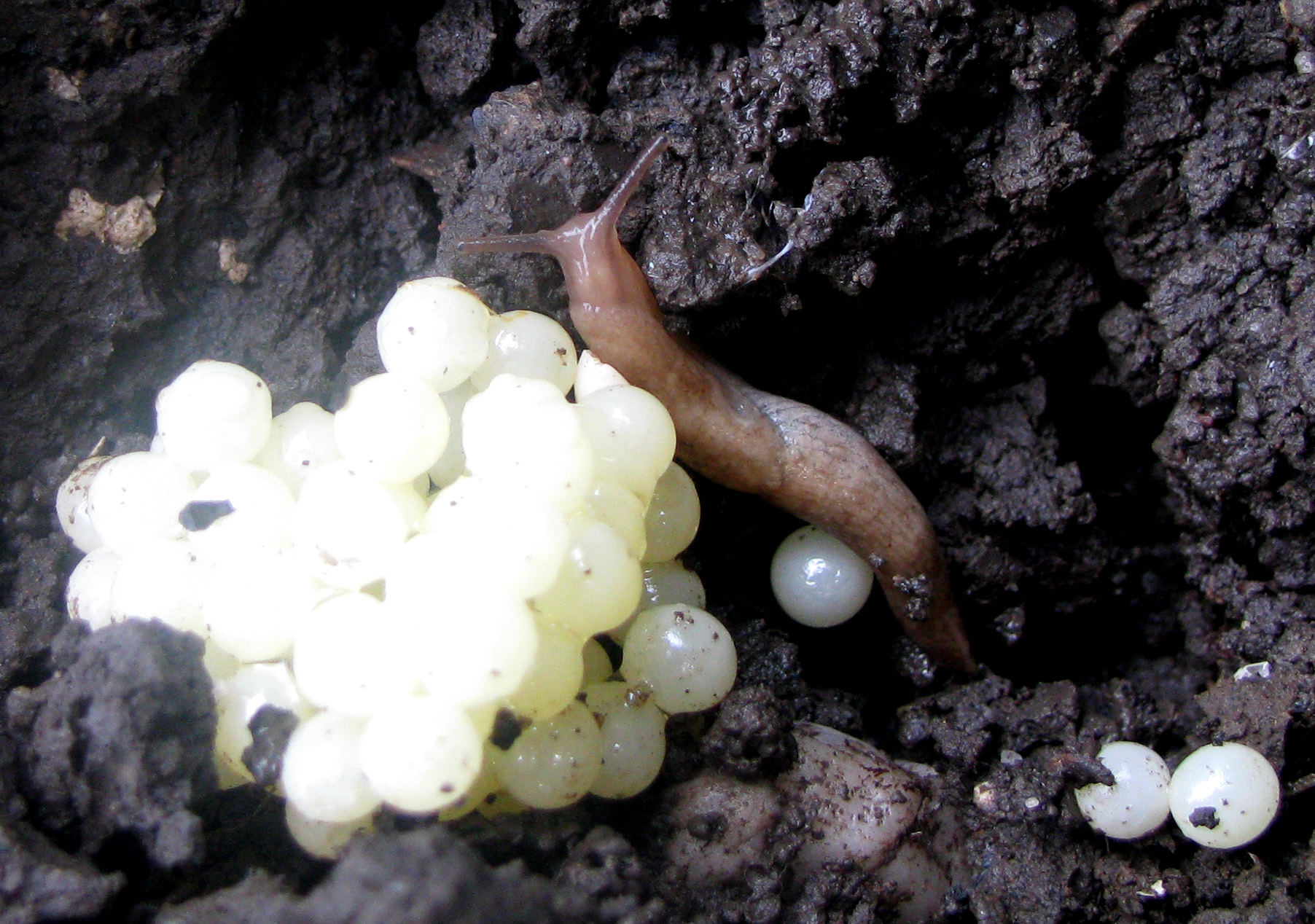
Juvenile Deroceras reticulatum, with eggs of another gastropod, under a stone in a garden in Weimar

Several species in this genus are recognised as pests of agriculture and horticulture, including Deroceras reticulatum, Deroceras invadens, Deroceras agreste, and Deroceras laeve.
