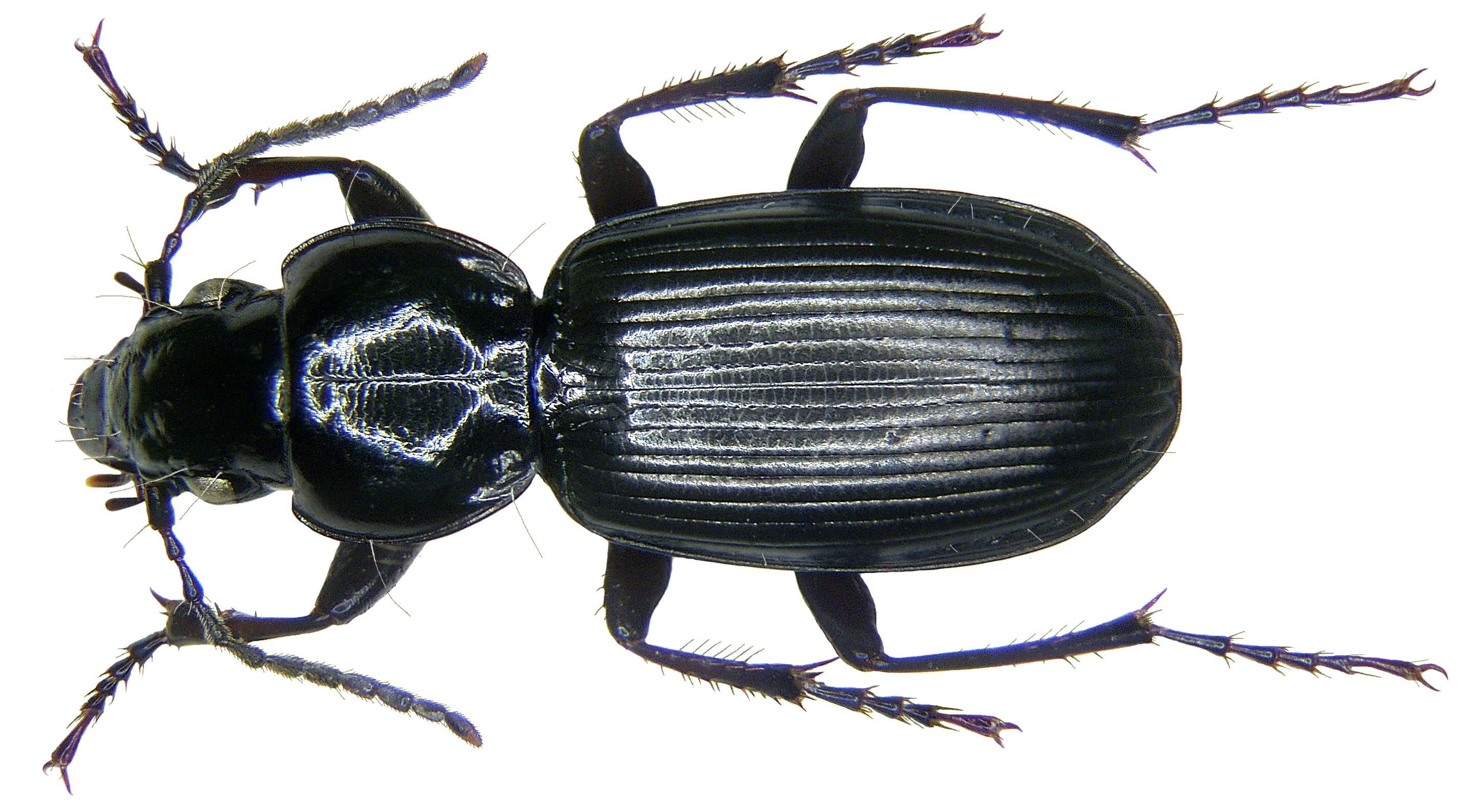

Scientific classification
- Kingdom: Animalia
- Phylum: Arthropoda
- Clade: Pancrustacea
- Class: Insecta
- Order: Coleoptera
- Suborder: Adephaga
- Family: Carabidae
- Subfamily: Pterostichinae
- Tribe: Pterostichini
- Genus: Pterostichus
- Species: P. madidus

Binomial name
- Pterostichus madidus (Fabricius, 1775)

= Pterostichus madidus =

Species of beetle

Pterostichus madidus, commonly known as the black clock beetle, is a species of ground beetle native to Europe. The black clock beetle typically grows between 14–20mm in length, and is black in colouration, with legs that are usually red, reddish brown, or black. It can be found most abundantly in summer, and breeds during the autumn. It is commonly found in gardens, grasslands, and dry woodland, under stones, in grass, or in loose bark.

In the United Kingdom, this beetle is commonly known as the rain beetle as they tend to appear when rain is imminent. There is an old superstition that should you step on one or kill one, it will cause it to rain.
