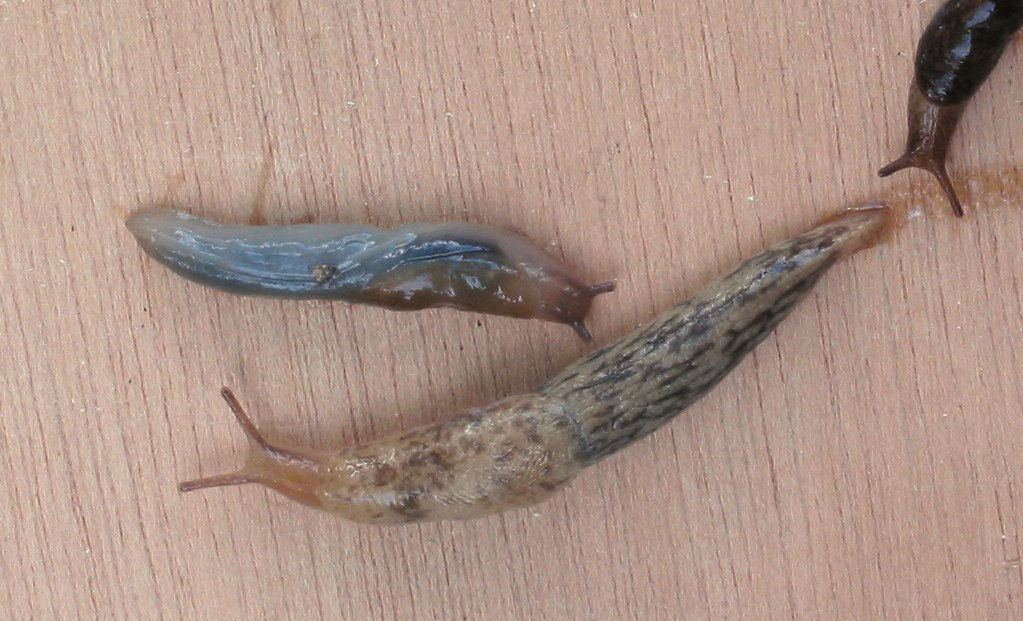
- The largest slug in the image is an individual of Deroceras reticulatum

Scientific classification
- Kingdom: Animalia
- Phylum: Mollusca
- Class: Gastropoda
- Order: Stylommatophora
- Superfamily: Limacoidea
- Family: Agriolimacidae; H. Wagner, 1935

Type genus
- Agriolimax Mörch, 1865

Diversity
- 6 genera, about 135 species (123 species in Deroceras + at least 12 other species)

= Agriolimacidae =

Agriolimacidae Temporal range: Pleistocene–Recent

Family of gastropods

Agriolimacidae is a family of small and medium-sized land slugs, or shell-less snails, terrestrial pulmonate gastropod mollusks.

== Distribution ==
Distribution of Limacidae is Holarctic, this include: Nearctic, western Palearctic and eastern Palearctic.

Agriolimacidae is the largest slug family, some are introduced all over the world, synanthropes are often severe pests.

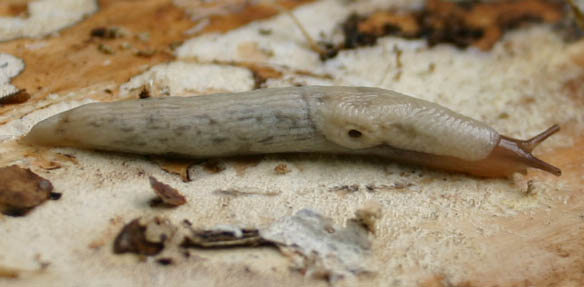
This view of the right side of Deroceras praecox clearly shows the position of its pneumostome.

== Anatomy ==
Most slugs in the family Agriolimacidae are rather small; only a few (in the genera Mesolimax and Krynickillus) are larger. Most are not more than 50 mm long. The mantle is usually large, occupying approximately 1/3 of the entire body length, situated in the anterior part of the body. The pneumostome is clearly postmedial. The surface of the mantle in living slugs is covered in concentric, mobile wrinkles. In addition sometimes there is a shallow, poorly defined groove which runs above the pneumostome on the right side, not passing to the left.

The penis is short, usually bag-shaped, often with external appendages, inside with different stimulatory organs. No tubular membrane encircles the penis and vas deferens. The penis retractor muscle is situated beside the right tentacle.

In this family, the number of haploid chromosomes lies between 26 and 30 (according to the values in this table).

== Taxonomy ==
The following two subfamilies have been recognized in the taxonomy of Bouchet & Rocroi (2005):

- subfamily Agriolimacinae H. Wagner, 1935 – synonym: Deroceratinae Magne, 1952
- subfamily Mesolimacinae Hausdorf, 1998

== Genera ==
Genera within the family Agriolimacidae include:

subfamily Agriolimacinae

- Deroceras Rafinesque, 1820 – type genus described as Agriolimax Mörch, 1865
- Furcopenis Castillejo & Wiktor, 1983
- Krynickillus Kaleniczenko, 1851

subfamily Mesolimacinae

- Mesolimax Pollonera, 1888
  - Mesolimax brauni Pollonera, 1888

subfamily ?

- Lytopelte Boettger, 1886
- Megalopelte Lindholm, 1914

== Cladogram ==
A cladogram showing the phylogenic relationships of this family to other families within the limacoid clade:

- limacoid clade
  - Staffordioidea
    Staffordiidae
  - - - Dyakioidea
        Dyakiidae
      - Gastrodontoidea
        - Pristilomatidae
        - - Chronidae
          - - Euconulidae
            - Trochomorphidae
          - - Gastrodontidae
            - Oxychilidae
    - - Parmacelloidea
        - Trigonochlamydidae
        - Parmacellidae
        - Milacidae
      - - - Zonitoidea
            Zonitidae
          - Helicarionoidea
            - Helicarionidae
            - - Ariophantidae
              - Urocyclidae
        - Limacoidea
          - Vitrinidae
          - - Boettgerillidae
            - - Limacidae
              - Agriolimacidae
