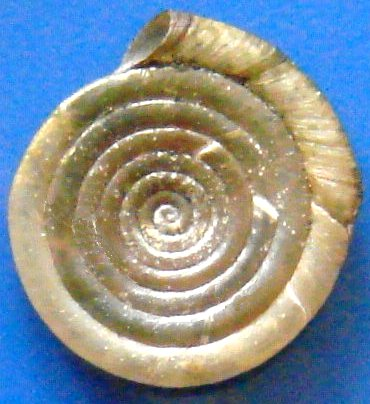
- Shell of Anisus calculiformis

Scientific classification
- Domain: Eukaryota
- Kingdom: Animalia
- Phylum: Mollusca
- Class: Gastropoda
- Superorder: Hygrophila
- Family: Planorbidae
- Genus: Anisus
- Species: A. calculiformis

Binomial name
- Anisus calculiformis (Sandberger, 1874)

Synonyms
- Anisus septemgyratus auct. (not Rossmässler)

= Anisus calculiformis =

Species of gastropod

Anisus calculiformis is a very small species of air-breathing freshwater snail, an aquatic pulmonate gastropod mollusk in the family Planorbidae, the ram's horn snails.

== Synonyms ==
Most authors misidentified Anisus calculiformis, applying the name Anisus septemgyratus to animals which are in reality Anisus calculiformis. So Anisus septemgyratus auct. (not Rossmässler) is synonymous with Anisus calculiformis.

The database WoRMS on the other hand considers this name a junior synonym of Anisus septemgyratus (Rossmässler, 1835)

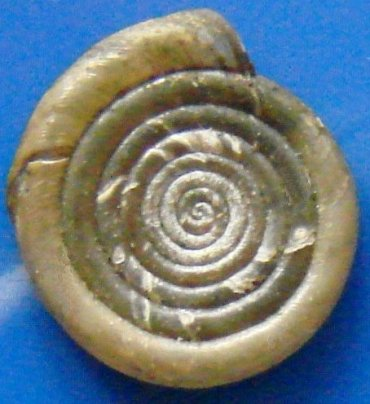
bottom of shell of Anisus calculiformis

== Distribution ==
This species occurs in:

- Czech Republic – in Moravia, critically endangered (CR)
- Poland
- Slovakia
- British Isles
- ...

== See also ==
- Anisus leucostoma
