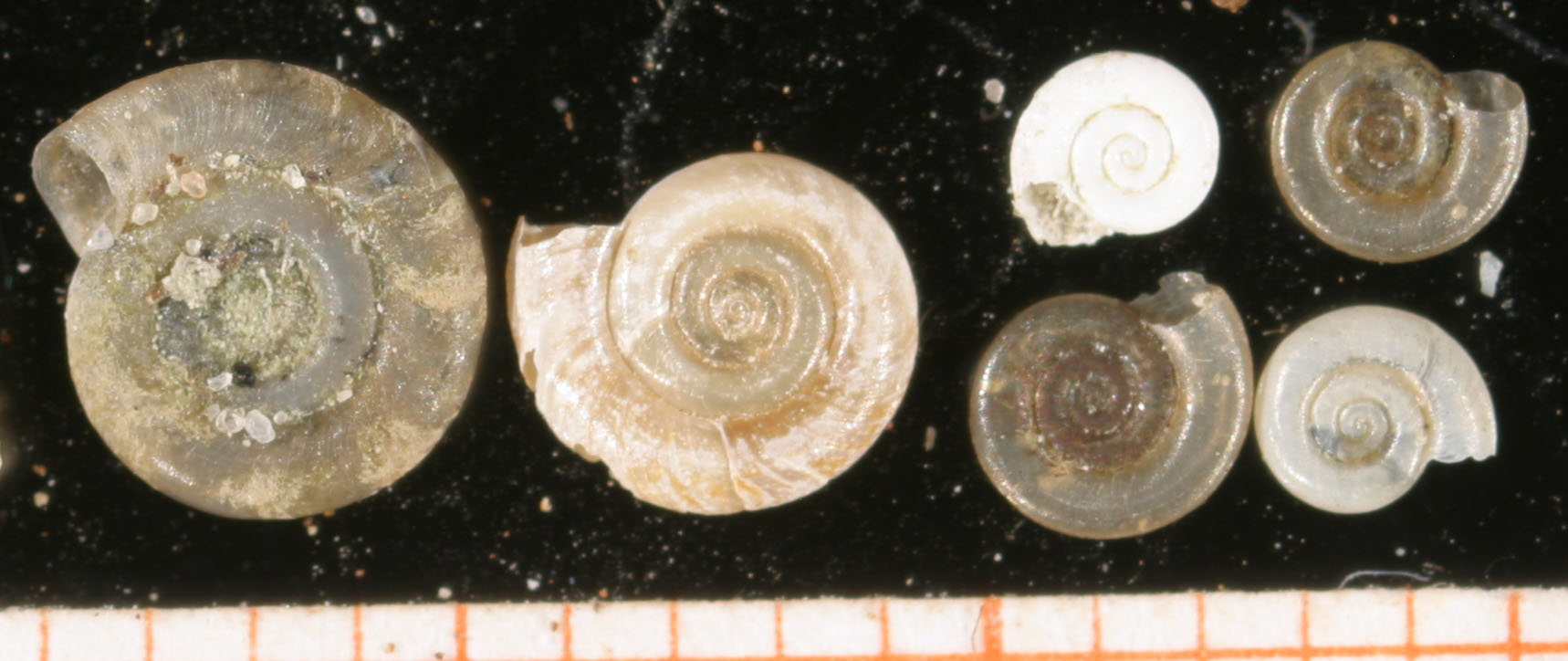
- Shells of Anisus vorticulus

Conservation status
- Data Deficient (IUCN 3.1)

Scientific classification
- Kingdom: Animalia
- Phylum: Mollusca
- Class: Gastropoda
- Superorder: Hygrophila
- Family: Planorbidae
- Genus: Anisus
- Species: A. vorticulus

Binomial name
- Anisus vorticulus (Troschel, 1834)

= Anisus vorticulus =

Species of gastropod

Anisus vorticulus (lesser ramshorn snail or little whirlpool ramshorn snail) is a species of small, air-breathing, freshwater snail, an aquatic gastropod mollusk in the family Planorbidae, the ramshorn snails.

== Description ==
The lesser ramshorn snail is a very small species growing to a maximum diameter of 5 mm (0.2 in). The shell lacks a keel and the peripheral angle is relatively prominent, with a slender, narrow periostracal fringe.

== Distribution ==
Anisus vorticulus occurs in Czech Republic - critically endangered (CR). Its Conservation status in 2004–2006 is bad (U2) in report for European Commission in accordance with Habitats Directive. England - vulnerable (VU), listed in List of endangered species in the British Isles. It is currently the focus of a Back from the Brink project. Ireland, Germany - critically endangered (vom Aussterben bedroht), Netherlands, Poland, Slovakia - critically endangered, Latvia and Croatia - in the Krka National Park. First finding of this species in Croatia was in 2009.

In the British Isles, this species is restricted to a small number of sites in the Norfolk Broads and the Pevensey Levels and Arun Valley in Sussex and Surrey.

Overall, the IUCN conservation status in the Europe and Mediterranean regions is Near Threatened (NT).

== Habitat ==
This small snail lives in pools with standing water and in oxbow lakes, but these biotopes are threatened because of sedimentation and ecological succession. It favours ditches with much aquatic flora but little emergent vegetation. Invasive plants such as floating marsh pennywort, (Hydrocotyle ranunculouides), that sometimes chokes ditches, and the Himalayan balsam (Impatiens glandulifera) are particularly harmful.

This species often lives in places where there is abundant duckweed Lemna spp. Water quality that is suitable for Anisus vorticulus is water without turbidity, with a high pH and a low level of nutrients. The main threats to this snail include land drainage, poor habitat management and eutrophication.

== Conservation ==
=== United Kingdom ===
Anisus vorticulus is a protected species in the United Kingdom under the Conservation of Habitats and Species Regulations 2010 and a license is needed to possess live or dead specimens taken from the wild since October 2008. The species has gained coverage in the UK as infrastructure projects impacting its habitats have been delayed. 800 snails living in ditches alongside the Acle Straight, a part of the A47 road, were moved to a new habitat in 2016, delaying expansion plans for the road until monitoring at the new habitats was complete in 2023. In 2022, it was reported that the translocation had had "mixed" results; in 2025, National Highways' full report found that it had been successful.

Later in 2025, British Chancellor Rachel Reeves was recorded saying she had unblocked a planned development of 20,000 homes at a site in Sussex which had "some snails on the site that are a protected species or something", apparently referring to A. vorticulus. Craig Bennett, CEO of The Wildlife Trusts, said it was "shocking ... to hear the way that the chancellor just dismisses ecological science" and noted that there was a "proud tradition" of assessing the environmental impact of building projects before permitting them.
