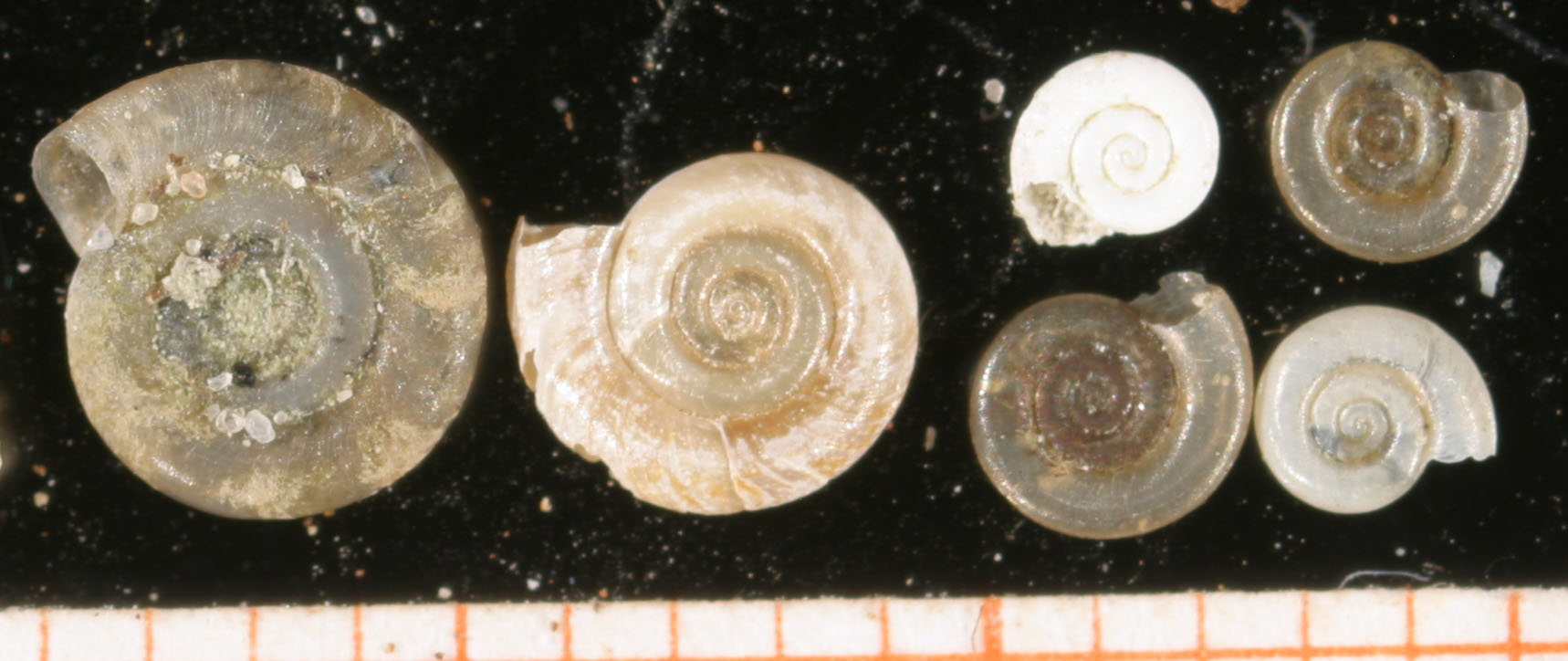
- Shells of Anisus vorticulus

Scientific classification
- Kingdom: Animalia
- Phylum: Mollusca
- Class: Gastropoda
- Superorder: Hygrophila
- Family: Planorbidae
- Subfamily: Planorbinae
- Tribe: Planorbini
- Genus: Anisus; H. Studer, 1820

Synonyms
- List: Anisus (Anisus) S. Studer, 1820; accepted, alternate representation; Anisus (Costorbis) Lindholm, 1926; accepted, alternate representation; Anisus (Disculifer) C. R. Boettger, 1944; accepted, alternate representation; † Anisus (Odontogyrorbis) Lörenthey, 1906; (junior synonym); † Anisus (Pseudocarinogyraulus) Popova & Starobogatov, 1970; accepted, alternate representation; Anisus (Spiralina) Martens, 1899; (junior homonym of Spiralina Chaster, 1898; junior synonym); Anisus (Vorticulus) Prozorova & Starobogatov, 1997; (junior subjective synonym); † Odontogyrorbis Lörenthey, 1906; (junior subjective synonym); Paraspira Dall, 1905; (junior subjective synonym); † Paraspira (Odontogyrorbis) Lörenthey, 1906; (junior synonym); Paraspira (Paraspira) Dall, 1905; (junior synonym); Planorbis (Anisus) Studer, 1820; (original name); Planorbis (Costorbis) Lindholm, 1926; (original rank); Planorbis (Diplodiscus) Westerlund, 1897; (junior homonym of Diplodiscus Diesing, 1835); † Planorbis (Odontogyrorbis) Lörenthey, 1906; (junior synonym); Planorbis (Spiralina) von Martens, 1899; (junior homonym of Spiralina Chaster, 1898); Planorbis (Rotundatusiana) Germain, 1903; (junior synonym); Planorbis (Spiralina) E. von Martens, 1899; (junior homonym of Spiralina Chaster, 1898); Planorbis (Spirorbis) Swainson, 1840; (junior homonym of Spirorbis Daudin, 1800 [Polychaeta]; junior synonym); † Pseudocarinogyraulus Popova & Starobogatov, 1970; (superseded rank); Spiralina Martens, 1899 (junior homonym of Spiralina Chaster, 1898; junior synonym); Spirulina; (misspelling)

= Anisus =

Genus of gastropods

Anisus is a genus of small air-breathing freshwater snails, aquatic pulmonate gastropod mollusks in the subfamily Planorbinae of the family Planorbidae, the ramshorn snails and their allies.

== Species ==
The genus contains the following species:

Extant

- Anisus bachlongviensus Saurin, 1960
- Anisus centrogyratus (Westerlund, 1875)
- Anisus leucostoma (Millet, 1813)
- Anisus pauxillus van Benthem Jutting, 1963
- Anisus ressmanianus (Westerlund, 1875)
- Anisus sarasinorum (Bollinger, 1914)
- Anisus septemgyratus (Rossmässler, 1835)
- Anisus spirorbis (Linnaeus, 1758) - the type species of the genus
- Anisus strauchianus (Clessin, 1884)
- Anisus vortex (Linnaeus, 1758)
- Anisus vorticulus (Troschel, 1834)

Extinct

- † Anisus altaicus Popova & Starobogatov, 1970
- † Anisus angulatus (Clessin, 1877)
- † Anisus arltungae McMichael, 1968
- † Anisus balizacensis (Peyrot, 1932)
- † Anisus bicarinatus Szőts, 1953
- † Anisus brunnensis (Sauerzopf, 1953)
- † Anisus coislinensis (Sauerzopf, 1953)
- † Anisus confusus Soós, 1934
- † Anisus densecostatus Schütt, 1994
- † Anisus deviatkini Popova & Starobogatov, 1970
- † Anisus dupuyianus (Noulet, 1854)
- † Anisus falsani (Locard, 1883)
- † Anisus guerichi (Andreae, 1902)
- † Anisus gulmargensis Bhatia, 1975
- † Anisus hilgendorfi (Fraas, 1868)
- † Anisus karkaraensis (Schlosser, 1906)
- † Anisus komarovae Prysjazhnjuk, 1974
- † Anisus krambergeri (Halaváts, 1903)
- † Anisus laskarevi Milošević, 1976
- † Anisus lentiformis Popova & Starobogatov, 1970
- † Anisus lungershauseni Popva & Starobogatov, 1970
- † Anisus mariae (Michaud, 1862)
- † Anisus metochiensis Milošević, 1976
- † Anisus nechoroshevi Popova & Starobogatov, 1970
- † Anisus omalus (Bourguignat, 1881)
- † Anisus paritus Y.-T. Li, 1986
- † Anisus pseudoplanulatus Szőts, 1953
- † Anisus pseudosubangulatus Szőts, 1953
- † Anisus racovetzae Popova & Starobogatov, 1970
- † Anisus ressmanianus (Westerlund, 1875)
- † Anisus rousianus (Noulet, 1854)
- † Anisus saddaritanus (Pallary, 1901)
- † Anisus septemgyratiformis (Gottschick, 1911)
- † Anisus subanguloides H.-J. Wang, 1982
- † Anisus thomasi (Pallary, 1901)
- † Anisus trapeziiformis Popova & Starobogatov, 1970
- † Anisus tuerykensis Popova & Starobogatov, 1970
- † Anisus vorticoides (Martinson, 1954)
- † Anisus weizhouensis H.-J. Wang, 1982

Uncertain (Taxon Inqurendum)

- Anisus dietmari Schütt, 1973
- Anisus issykulensis (Clessin, 1907)
- Anisus calculiformis (Sandberger, 1874)

Subspecies and species brought into synonymy (Selection)

- Subgenus Anisus (Gyraulus) Agassiz in Charpentier, 1837: synonym of Gyraulus Charpentier, 1837
- Anisus (Gyraulus) terekholicus Prozorova & Starobogato, 1997: synonym of Gyraulus terekholicus (Prozorova & Starobogatov, 1997)
- Subgenus † Anisus (Odontogyrorbis) Lörenthey, 1906: synonym of Anisus (Anisus) Studer, 1820
- Subgenus Anisus (Spiralina) Martens, 1899: synonym of Anisus Studer, 1820
- † Anisus angustigyratus (Sauerzopf, 1953): synonym of † Anisus (Anisus) krambergeri (Halaváts, 1903)
- † Anisus dupuyanus (Noulet, 1854): synonym of † Anisus dupuyianus (Noulet, 1854)
- Anisus septemgyratus auct. (not Rossmässler): synonym of Anisus calculiformis (Sandberger, 1874)
- Anisus tokyoensis Mori, 1938: synonym of Gyraulus tokyoensis (Mori, 1938)
