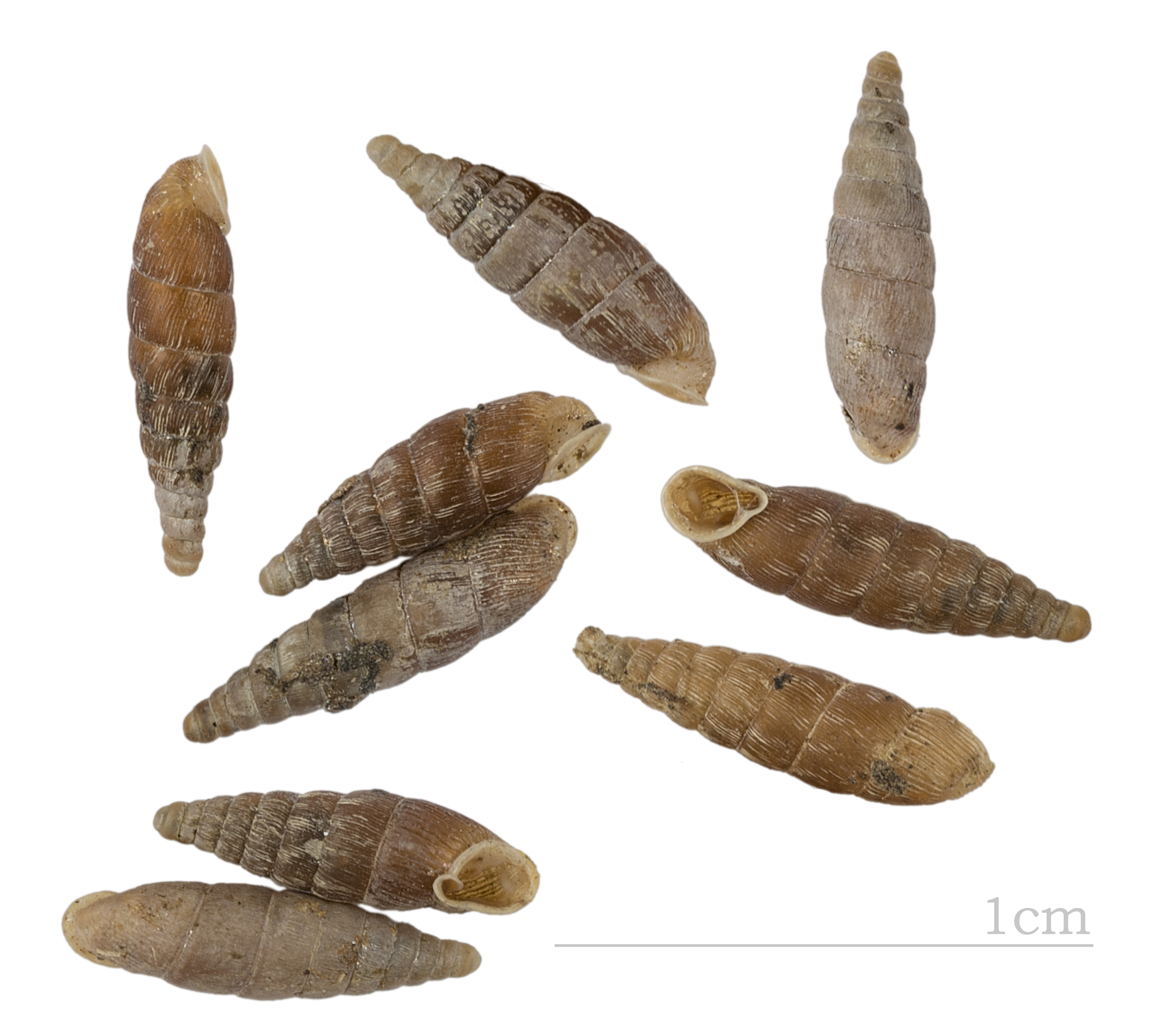
- Shells of Clausilia rugosa reboudii

Scientific classification
- Kingdom: Animalia
- Phylum: Mollusca
- Class: Gastropoda
- Order: Stylommatophora
- Family: Clausiliidae
- Subfamily: Clausiliinae
- Tribe: Clausiliini
- Genus: Clausilia; Draparnaud, 1805

Type species
- Pupa rugosa Draparnaud, 1801

Synonyms
- Clausilia (Andraea) L. Pfeiffer, 1848· accepted, alternate representation; Clausilia (Clausilia) Draparnaud, 1805· accepted, alternate representation; Clausilia (Lombardiella) H. Nordsieck, 2013· accepted, alternate representation; Clausilia (Neostyriaca) A.J. Wagner, 1920· accepted, alternate representation; Clausilia (Neostyriaca) A. J. Wagner, 1920· accepted, alternate representation; Clausilia (Strobeliella) H. Nordsieck, 1977· accepted, alternate representation; Glischrus (Clausilia) Draparnaud, 1805 (superseded generic combination); Helix (Clausilia) Draparnaud, 1805 (superseded combination); Neostyria A.J. Wagner, 1920; Neostyriaca A.J. Wagner, 1920; Neostyriaca (Lombardiella) H. Nordsieck, 2013; Rupicola W. Hartmann, 1841

= Clausilia =

Genus of gastropods

Clausilia is a European genus of small, air-breathing land snails, terrestrial pulmonate gastropod mollusks in the family Clausiliidae, the door snails, all of which have a clausilium.

Snails in this genus have left-handed coiling in their shells, which are very elongate in shape.

== Species ==
Species within the genus Clausilia include:

- †Clausilia baudoni Michaud, 1862
- Clausilia bidentata (Strøm, 1765)
- Clausilia brembina Strobel, 1850
- † Clausilia ceresolensis H. Nordsieck, 2013
- Clausilia corynodes Held, 1836
- Clausilia cruciata (Studer, 1820)
- † Clausilia dehmi (H. Nordsieck, 2007)
- Clausilia dubia Draparnaud, 1805
- Clausilia gracilis C. Pfeiffer, 1821
- Clausilia plicatula Draparaud
- † Clausilia portisii Sacco, 1886
- † Clausilia produbia H. Nordsieck, 1976
- † Clausilia prostrobeli (H. Nordsieck, 2013)
- Clausilia pumila Pfeiffer, 1828
- † Clausilia rolfbrandti (Schlickum, 1969)
- Clausilia rugicollis Rossmässler, 1836
- Clausilia rugosa (Draparnaud, 1801)
- † Clausilia stranzendorfensis H. Nordsieck, 1990
- † Clausilia strauchiana H. Nordsieck, 1972
- Clausilia strobeli Strobel, 1850
- Clausilia ventricova
- Clausilia whateliana Charpentier, 1850

Synonyms

- Clausilia (Alinda) H. Adams & A. Adams, 1855: synonym of Alinda H. Adams & A. Adams, 1855
