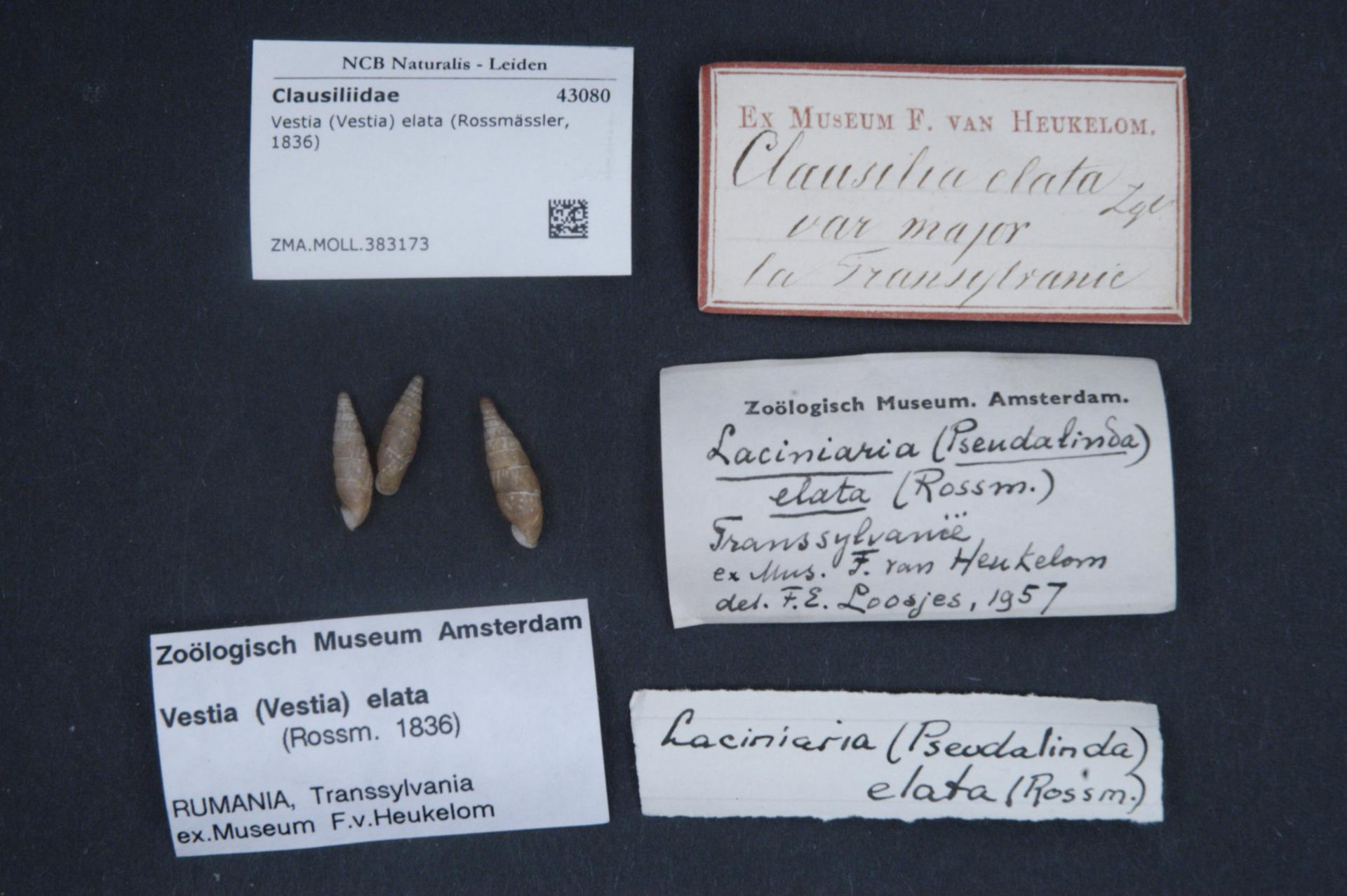

Scientific classification
- Kingdom: Animalia
- Phylum: Mollusca
- Class: Gastropoda
- Order: Stylommatophora
- Family: Clausiliidae
- Subfamily: Clausiliinae
- Genus: Vestia
- Species: V. elata

Binomial name
- Vestia elata (Rossmässler, 1836)

= Vestia elata =

Species of gastropod

Vestia elata is a species of gastropods belonging to the family Clausiliidae.

The species is found in Central Europe.
