= Vestia roschitzi =

Conservation status
- Least Concern (IUCN 3.1)

Scientific classification
- Kingdom: Animalia
- Phylum: Mollusca
- Class: Gastropoda
- Order: Stylommatophora
- Family: Clausiliidae
- Subfamily: Clausiliinae
- Tribe: Baleini
- Genus: Vestia
- Species: V. roschitzi

Binomial name
- Vestia roschitzi (Brancsik, 1890)

Synonyms
- Clausilia roschitzi Brancsik, 1890 (original combination); Uncinaria roschitzi (Brancsik, 1890) · unaccepted; Vestia (Vestiella) roschitzi (Brancsik, 1890) · alternate representation

Species of air-breathing land snail

Vestia roschitzi is a species of air-breathing land snail within the family Clausiliidae,

== Distribution ==
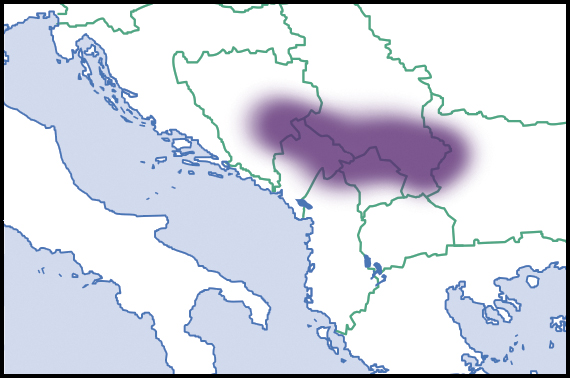
Distribution of Vestia roschitzi

This species is endemic to the Balkan Region with a distribution covering eastern Bulgaria, southern Serbia, northern Albania, Montenegro, and eastern Bosnia and Herzegovina. Its habitat is within mountains and foothills, living in wet deciduous forests, bushes, and rocks amongst vegetation at elevations of 500 to 2,500 metres (1,640 to 8,200 ft) high.

== Conservation ==
The current subpopulations on Vestia roschitzi are assumed to be stable, and no major threats are known to effect the species, although because of its morphological forms having a localized distribution range between populations it can be easily effected by disturbances within its environment. It has been classified as 'Least concern' by the IUCN Red List, as its large distribution covers several protected areas.

== Subspecies ==
Placed by MolluscaBase.

- Vestia roschitzi apragmosyne (A. J. Wagner, 1919)
- Vestia roschitzi minima (Pavlović, 1912)
- Vestia roschitzi neubertiana Dedov, 2010
- Vestia roschitzi nordsieckiana Urbański, 1979
- Vestia roschitzi pygmaea (Jaeckel, 1954)
- Vestia roschitzi roschitzi (Brancsik, 1890)
- Vestia roschitzi trigonostoma (Pavlović, 1912)
