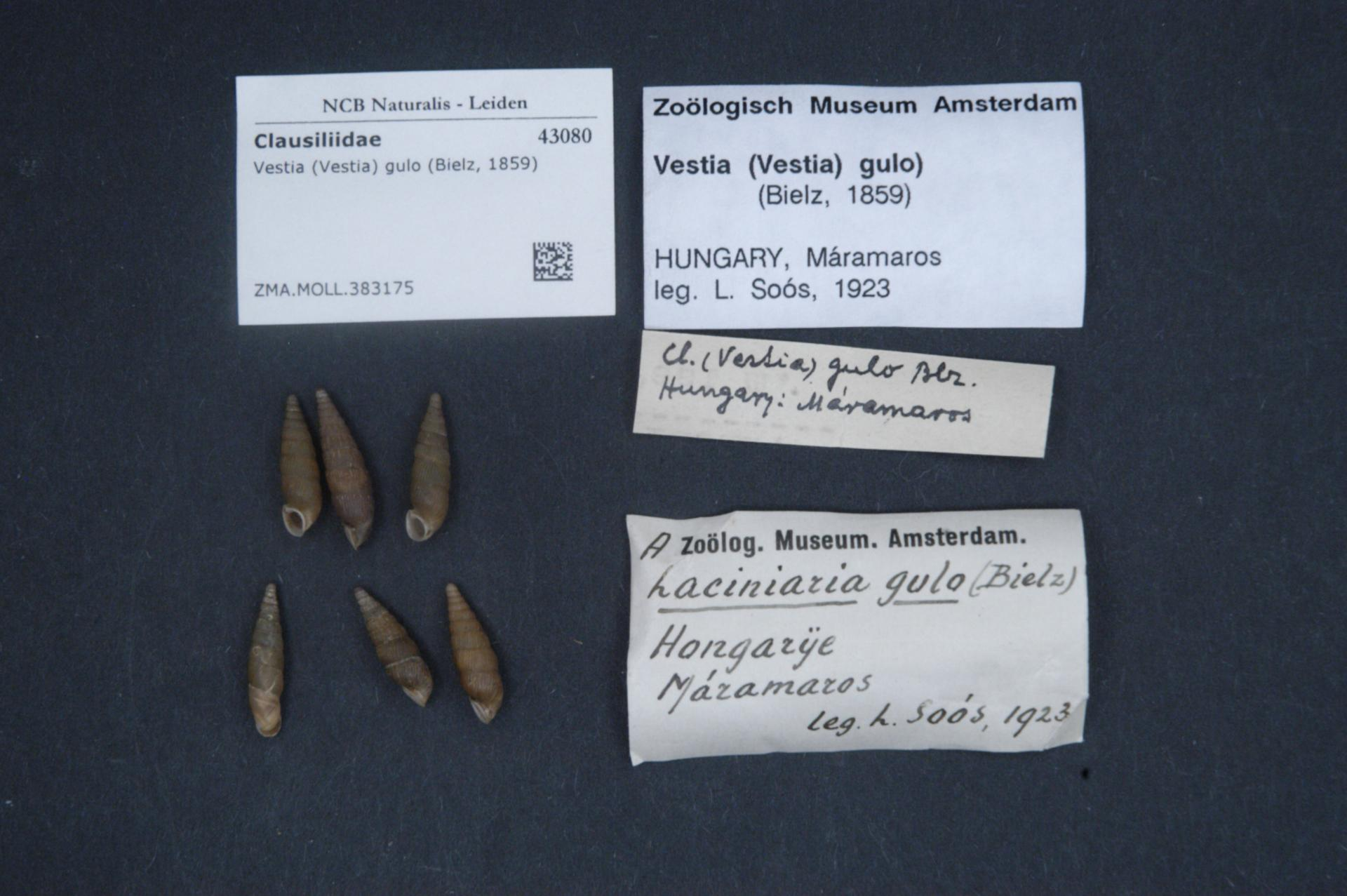

Scientific classification
- Domain: Eukaryota
- Kingdom: Animalia
- Phylum: Mollusca
- Class: Gastropoda
- Order: Stylommatophora
- Family: Clausiliidae
- Genus: Vestia
- Species: V. gulo

Binomial name
- Vestia gulo (E. A. Bielz, 1859)

= Vestia gulo =

Species of gastropod

Vestia gulo is a species of air-breathing land snail, a terrestrial pulmonate gastropod mollusk in the family Clausiliidae, the door snails, all of which have a clausilium.

== Distribution ==
This species occurs in:

- The Czech Republic - in Moravia only
- Ukraine
