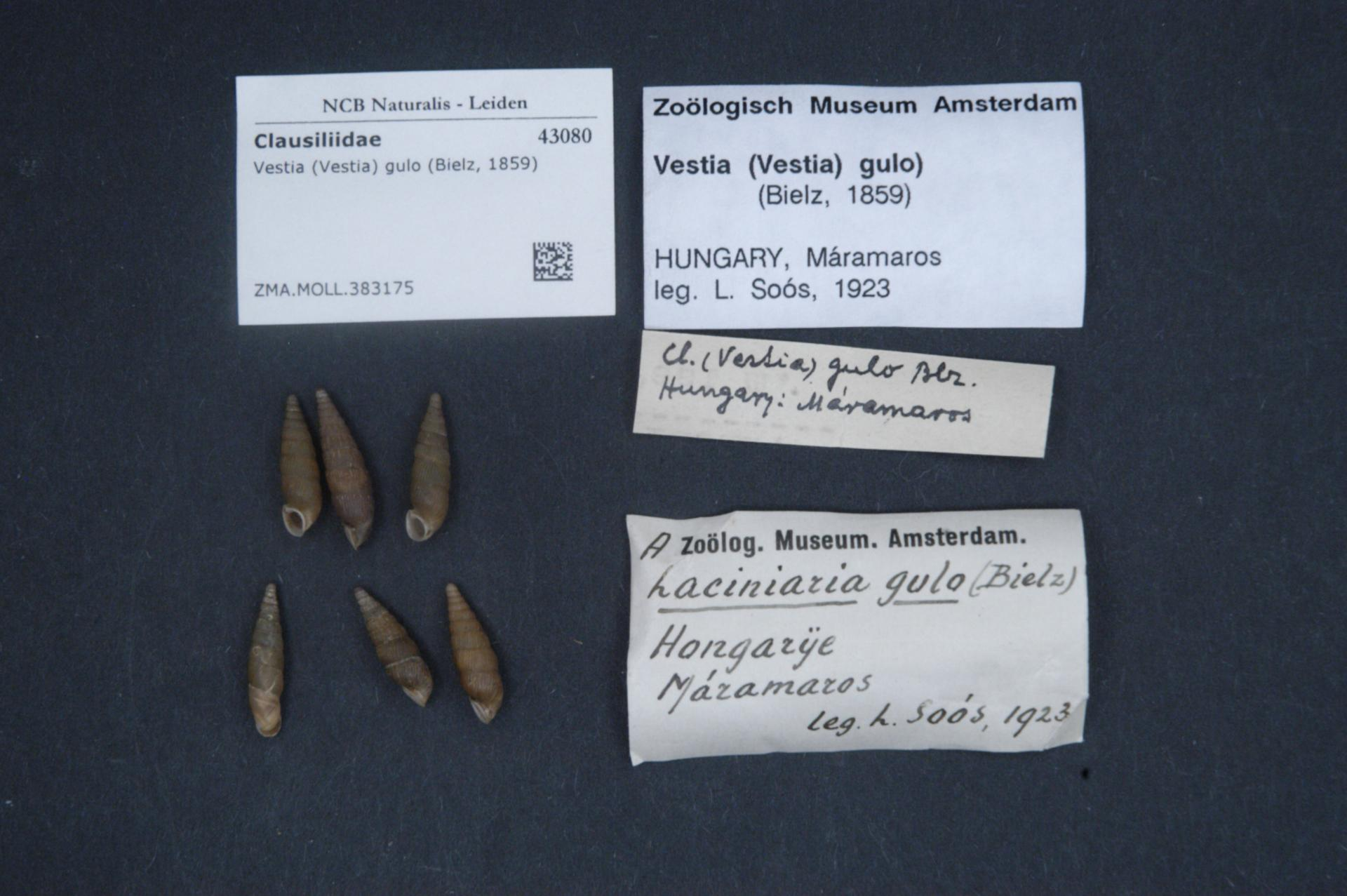
- Naturalis Biodiversity Center - ZMA.MOLL.383175 - Vestia (Vestia) gulo (Bielz, 1859) - Clausiliidae - Mollusc shell.

Scientific classification
- Kingdom: Animalia
- Phylum: Mollusca
- Class: Gastropoda
- Order: Stylommatophora
- Family: Clausiliidae
- Subfamily: Clausiliinae
- Tribe: Baleini
- Genus: Vestia; Hesse, 1916

Synonyms
- Uncinaria Vest, 1867 nec Frölich, 1789

= Vestia (gastropod) =

Genus of gastropods

Vestia is a genus of air-breathing land snails, terrestrial pulmonate gastropod mollusks in the family Clausiliidae, the door snails, all of which have a clausilium.

Paul Hesse named Vestia as a nomen novum for Uncinaria Vest, 1867, which was preoccupied by its senior homonym Uncinaria Frölich, 1789, a genus of nematode.

== Species ==
Species:

- Vestia elata (Rossmässler, 1836)
- Vestia gulo (Bielz, 1859)
- Vestia lazarovii Dedov, 2012
- Vestia pavlovici (Nordsieck, 1972)
- Vestia ranojevici (Pavlović, 1912)
- Vestia roschitzi (Brancsik, 1890)
- Vestia turgida (Rossmässler, 1836)
