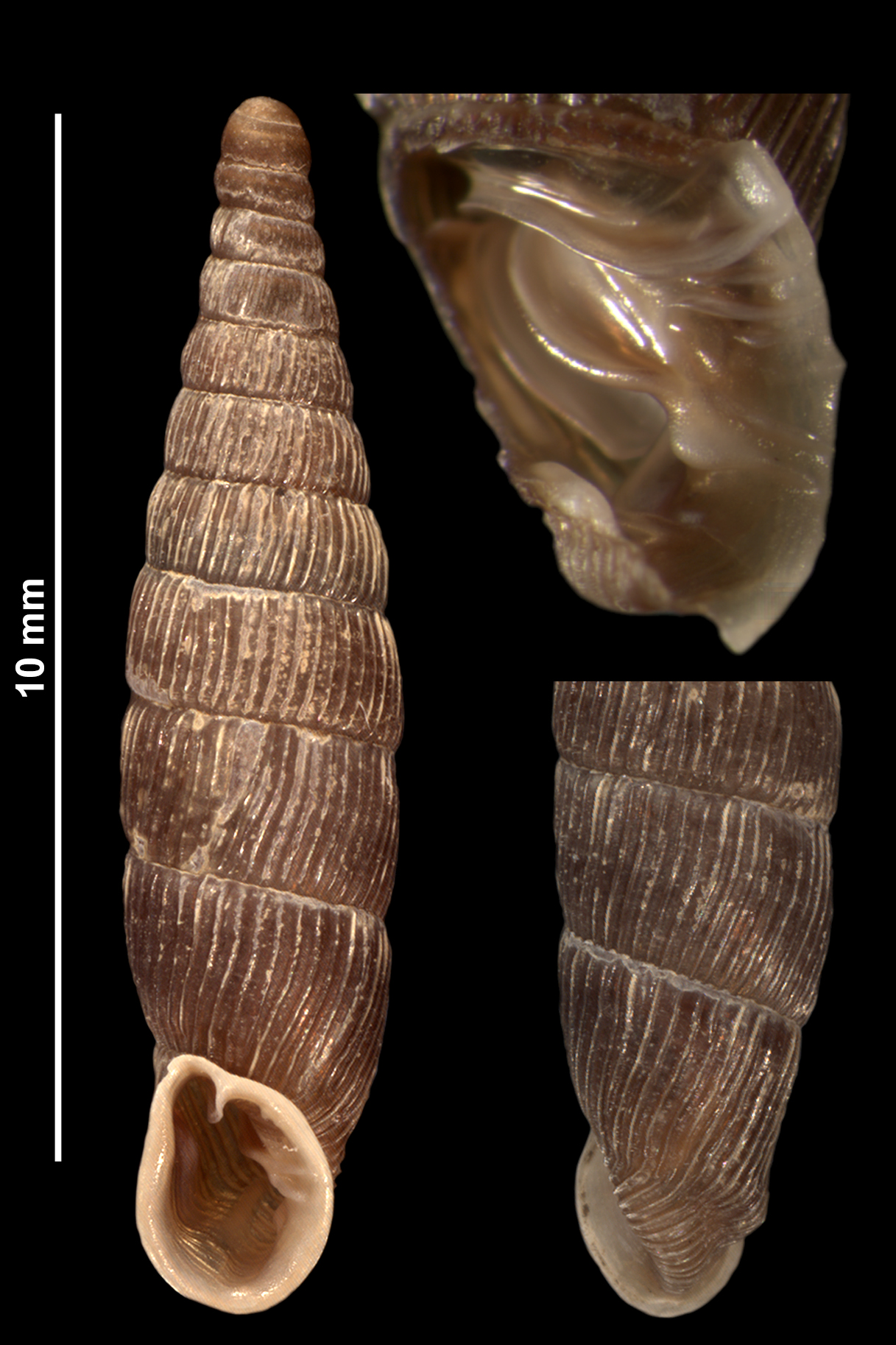
- Shell of Clausilia cruciata bonellii (specimen at MNHN, Paris)

Scientific classification
- Kingdom: Animalia
- Phylum: Mollusca
- Class: Gastropoda
- Order: Stylommatophora
- Family: Clausiliidae
- Subfamily: Clausiliinae
- Genus: Clausilia
- Species: C. cruciata

Binomial name
- Clausilia cruciata (Studer, 1820)

Synonyms
- Clausilia (Clausilia) cruciata (S. Studer, 1820)· accepted, alternate representation; Clausilia pusilla L. Pfeiffer, 1848 (junior synonym)

= Clausilia cruciata =

Species of gastropod

Clausilia cruciata is a species of air-breathing land snail, a terrestrial pulmonate gastropod mollusk in the family Clausiliidae.

== Subspecies ==
- Clausilia cruciata amiatae E. von Martens, 1873
- Clausilia cruciata bonellii E. von Martens, 1873
- Clausilia cruciata cruciata (S. Studer, 1820)
- Clausilia cruciata cuspidata Held, 1836
- Clausilia cruciata geminella Klemm, 1972
- Clausilia cruciata pedemontana H. Nordsieck, 1990

== Distribution ==
This species is found in:

- Austria
- Czech Republic
- Ukraine
