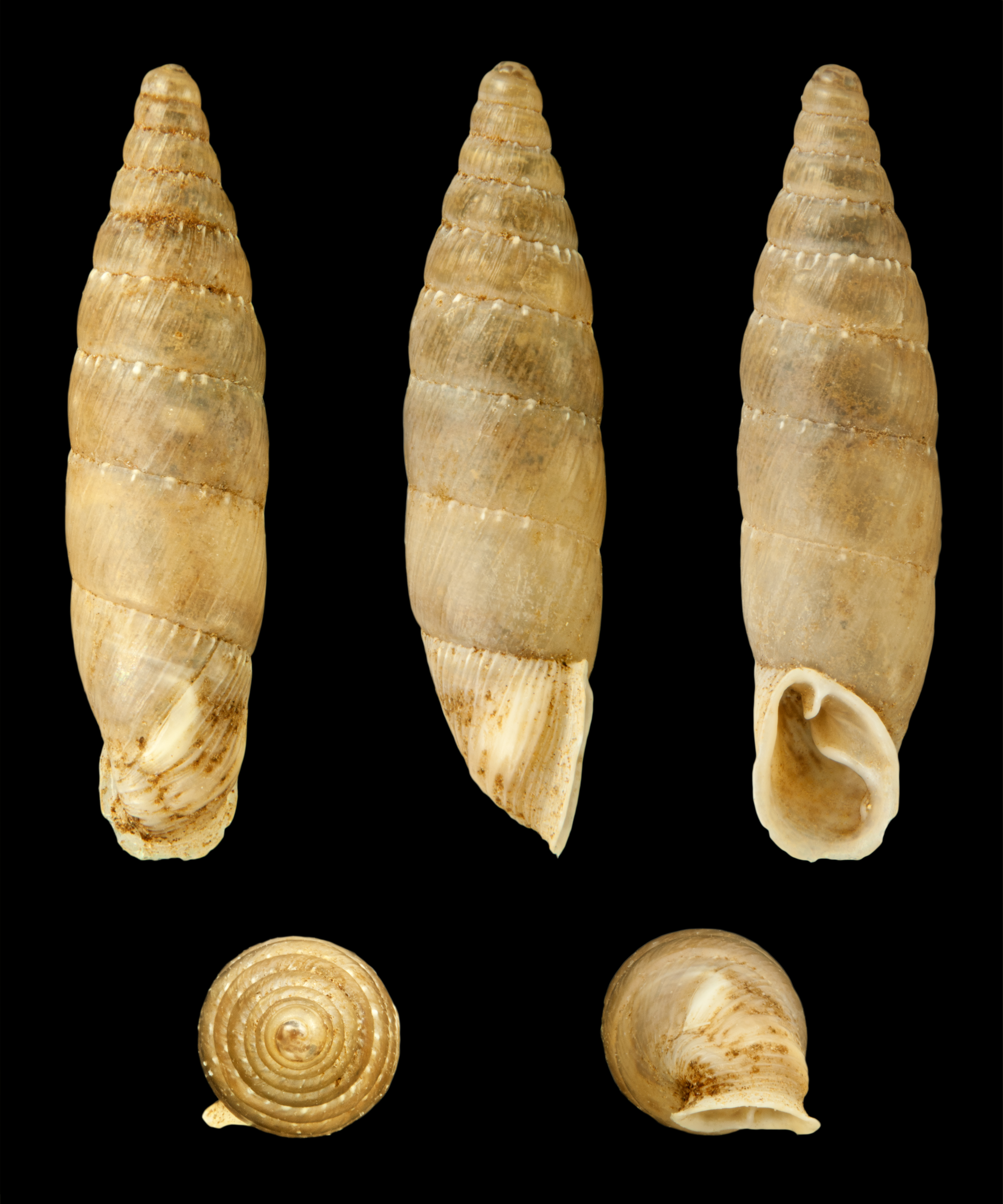

Scientific classification
- Domain: Eukaryota
- Kingdom: Animalia
- Phylum: Mollusca
- Class: Gastropoda
- Order: Stylommatophora
- Family: Clausiliidae
- Genus: Charpentieria
- Species: C. ornata

Binomial name
- Charpentieria ornata (Rossmässler, 1836)

Synonyms
- Itala ornata

= Charpentieria ornata =

Species of gastropod

Charpentieria ornata is a species of small, very elongate, air-breathing land snail, terrestrial pulmonate gastropod mollusks in the family Clausiliidae, the door snails, all of which have a clausilium.

== Distribution ==
The distribution of this species is eastern-Alpine.

It occurs in:

- Czech Republic
