= Vestia ranojevici =

Scientific classification
- Domain: Eukaryota
- Kingdom: Animalia
- Phylum: Mollusca
- Class: Gastropoda
- Order: Stylommatophora
- Family: Clausiliidae
- Genus: Vestia
- Species: V. ranojevici

Binomial name
- Vestia ranojevici (Pavlović, 1912)

Species of gastropod

Vestia ranojevici is a species of air-breathing land snail, a terrestrial pulmonate gastropod mollusk in the family Clausiliidae, the door snails, all of which have a clausilium.

== Subspecies ==
Subspecies within this species include:

- Vestia ranojevici moravica (Brabenec, 1952)

== Distribution ==
This species occurs in:

- Czech Republic - only the subspecies Vestia ranojevici moravica in Moravia
