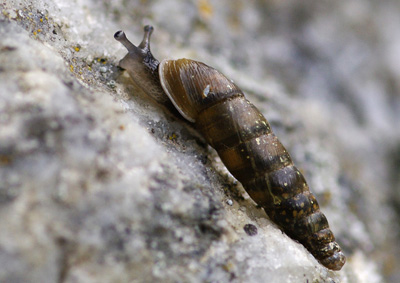
- A live Charpentieria dyodon

Conservation status
- Least Concern (IUCN 3.1)

Scientific classification
- Kingdom: Animalia
- Phylum: Mollusca
- Class: Gastropoda
- Order: Stylommatophora
- Family: Clausiliidae
- Genus: Charpentieria
- Species: C. dyodon

Binomial name
- Charpentieria dyodon Studer, 1820

= Charpentieria dyodon =

Species of gastropod

Charpentieria dyodon is a species of small, very elongated, air-breathing land snail, terrestrial pulmonate gastropod mollusks in the family Clausiliidae, the door snails, all of which have a clausilium. This species is found in Italy and Switzerland.
