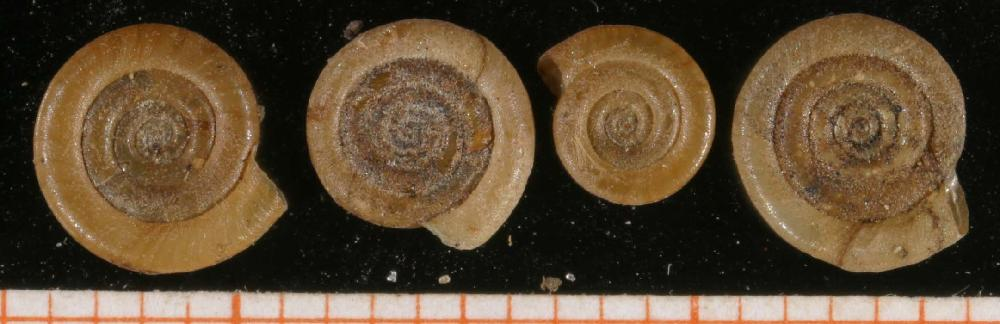
- Shells of Anisus leucostoma

Conservation status
- Least Concern (IUCN 3.1)

Scientific classification
- Kingdom: Animalia
- Phylum: Mollusca
- Class: Gastropoda
- Superorder: Hygrophila
- Family: Planorbidae
- Genus: Anisus
- Species: A. leucostoma

Binomial name
- Anisus leucostoma (Millet, 1813)

Synonyms
- Planorbis leucostoma Millet, 1813

= Anisus leucostoma =

Species of gastropod

Anisus leucostoma is a European species of small air-breathing freshwater snail, an aquatic pulmonate gastropod in the family Planorbidae, the ram's horn snails and their allies.

== Taxonomy ==
Glöer (2002) considered Anisus septemgyratus (Rossmässler, 1835) as a junior synonym of Anisus leucostoma (Millet, 1813). Later Glöer & Meier-Brook (2008) used name Anisus septemgyratus again.

Anisus leucostoma may be a narrow-whorled morphotype of Anisus spirorbis.

== Shell description ==
The shell of this species is about 8 mm in maximum dimension, usually planispiral and tightly coiled, with a white rib in the aperture.

== Distribution ==
This species occurs in countries and islands including:

- Czech Republic – near threatened (NT)
- Slovakia
- Germany
- British Isles: Great Britain, Ireland
