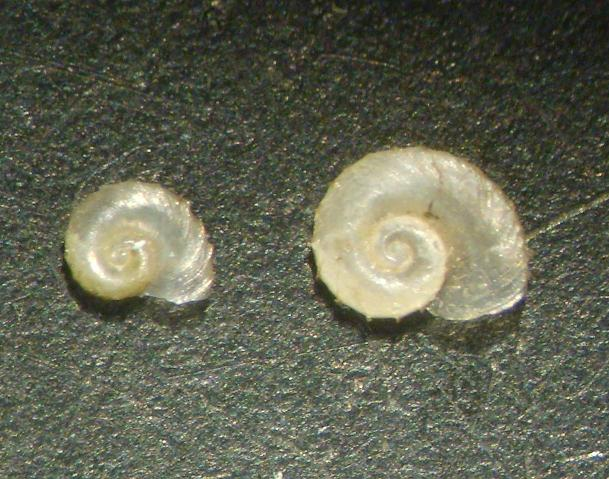

Conservation status
- Least Concern (IUCN 3.1)

- Secure (NatureServe)

Scientific classification
- Kingdom: Animalia
- Phylum: Mollusca
- Class: Gastropoda
- Superorder: Hygrophila
- Family: Planorbidae
- Genus: Armiger
- Species: A. crista

Binomial name
- Armiger crista (Linnaeus, 1758)

Synonyms
- List: Armiger exigua A. B. Leonard, 1972; Gyraulus (Armiger) crista (Linnaeus, 1758); Gyraulus crista (Linnaeus, 1758); Nautilus crista Linnaeus, 1758; Planorbis (Armiger) crista (Linnaeus, 1758); Planorbis (Armiger) crista var. inermis Lindholm, 1926; Planorbis (Armiger) gedyminensis B. Dybowski & Grochmalicki, 1922; Planorbis (Armiger) jagellonensis B. Dybowski & Grochmalicki, 1922; Planorbis (Armiger) nautileus (Linnaeus, 1767); Planorbis (Armiger) paravitoldianus B. Dybowski & Grochmalicki, 1922; Planorbis (Armiger) sobeskianus B. Dybowski & Grochmalicki, 1922; Planorbis (Armiger) vitoldianus B. Dybowski & Grochmalicki, 1922; Planorbis (Gyraulus) crista (Linnaeus, 1758); Planorbis (Gyraulus) crista var. spinulosus Clessin, 1884; Planorbis crista (Linnaeus, 1758); Planorbis cristatus Draparnaud, 1805; Planorbis imbricatus O. F. Müller, 1774; Planorbis nautileus (Linnaeus, 1767); Planorbis paladilhi Moitessier, 1867; Turbo nautileus Linnaeus, 1767

= Armiger crista =

Species of gastropod

Armiger crista, commonly known as the Nautilus ramshorn, is a minute species of freshwater snail, an aquatic pulmonate gastropod mollusk in the family Planorbidae, the ram's horn snails.

== Distribution ==
The distribution of this species is Holarctic (spread across the northern part of the whole northern hemisphere). The distribution type is circumpolar wide-temperate, and the range includes:

- Czech Republic - least concern (LC)
- Slovakia
- Germany
- Italy
- Netherlands
- Sweden
- The British Isles, Great Britain, Ireland
- See Fauna Europaea for European distribution.

== Shell description ==
The minute shell is nearly planispiral in its coiling, but the spire is actually considerably sunken rather than raised (which is usually the case with gastropods).

The shell has regular transverse ridges which form points extending beyond the main curve of the periphery of the shell.

The shell color is a translucent yellowy-brown. The maximum shell dimension is about 3 mm.

== Ecology ==
This snail lives on water plants in clear still freshwater. In Ireland it is common in medium to very small habitats including slow streams, drains and marsh and fen pools It is occasionally found in very acid waters.

This minute species, although technically a pulmonate gastropod, does not use air for respiration but instead absorbs oxygen through its mantle cavity which is full of water.
