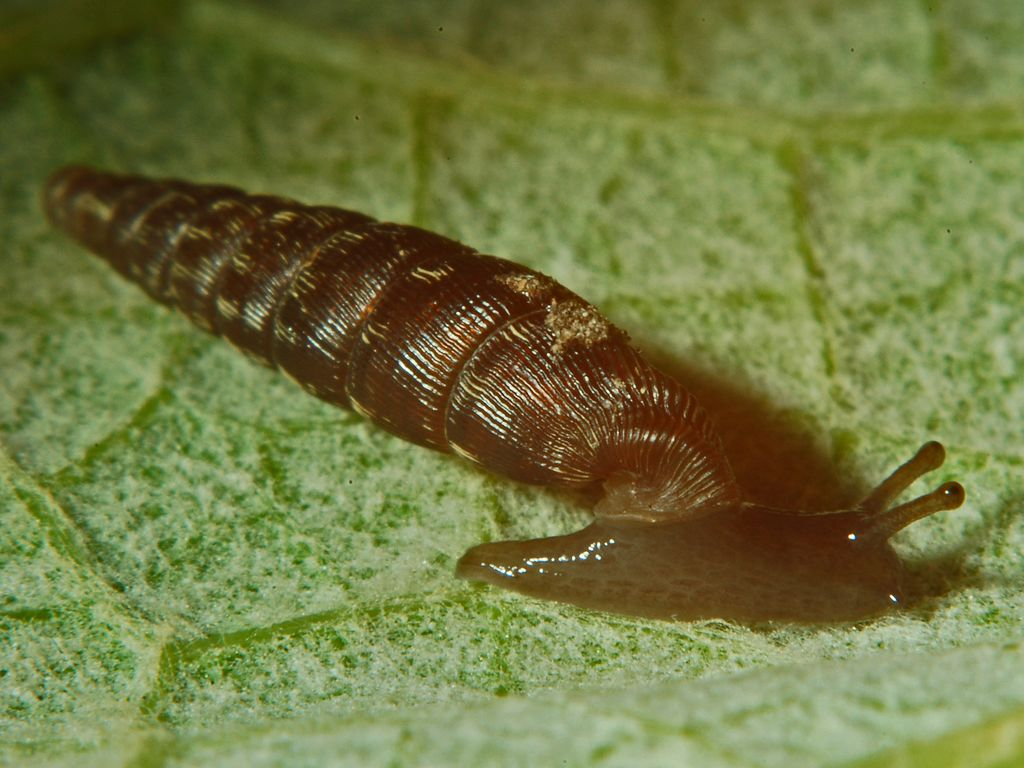
- Clausilia bidentata var. crenulata

Conservation status
- Least Concern (IUCN 3.1)

Scientific classification
- Kingdom: Animalia
- Phylum: Mollusca
- Class: Gastropoda
- Order: Stylommatophora
- Family: Clausiliidae
- Genus: Clausilia
- Species: C. bidentata

Binomial name
- Clausilia bidentata (Strøm, 1765)

Synonyms
- Turbo Bidentatus Strøm, 1765; Clausilia nigricans Maton & Rackett, 1807

= Clausilia bidentata =

Species of gastropod

Clausilia bidentata, the two-toothed door snail, is a species of door snails, terrestrial pulmonate gastropod mollusks in the genus Clausilia belonging to the family Clausiliidae, all of which have a clausilium.

== Subspecies ==
- Clausilia bidentata abietina Dupuy, 1849
- Clausilia bidentata bidentata (Ström, 1765)
- Clausilia bidentata crenulata Risso, 1826
- Clausilia bidentata moniziana Lowe, 1852

== Distribution ==
This species is present in much of western Europe, including:

- Czech Republic - in Bohemia only
- Great Britain
- Ireland

== Habitat ==
This species is commonly found under bark of trees or in crevices of rocks. The snails are often encountered when they are most active, at night during wet weather, at which time they often climb up trees and feed on lichens.

== Ecology ==
It selectively grazes on calcareous-rock lichens, particularly the crustose lichen species Verrucaria nigrescens.

== Description ==
The shell of this snail is a small and cylindrical snail, very high-spired and narrow. The shell length reaches 10–11 millimetres (0.39–0.43 in). The shell is dark brown with noticeable spiral ribs, slight longitudinal grooves, and a horny operculum.

== Gallery ==
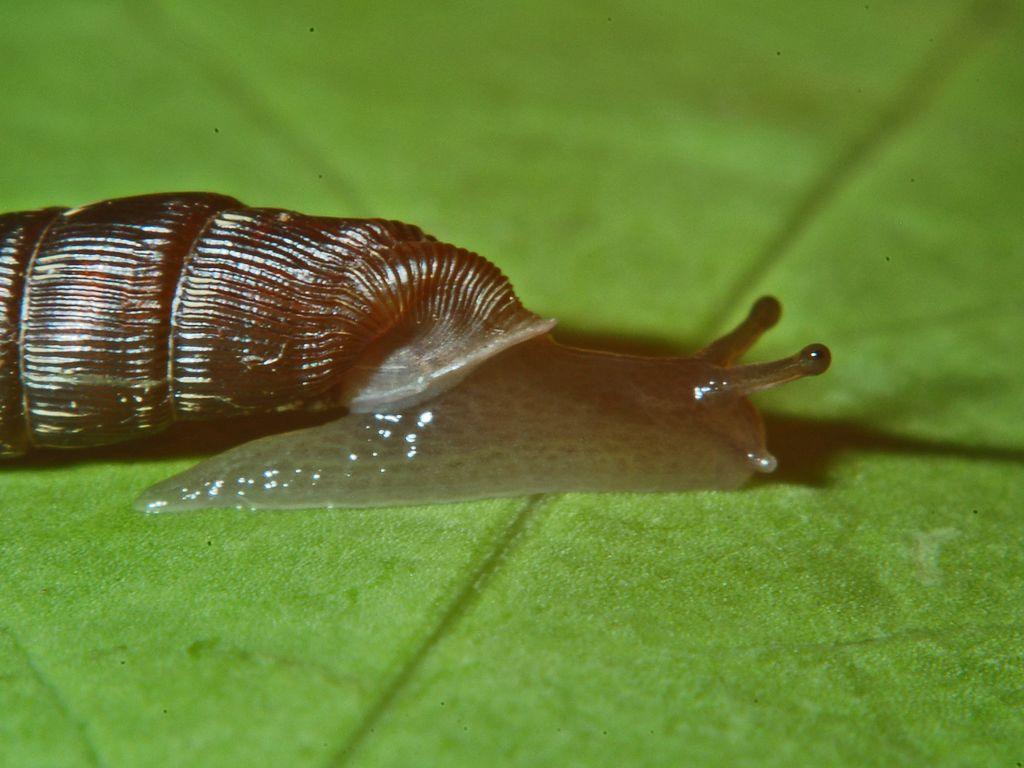
Clausilia bidentata var. crenulata – Close-up

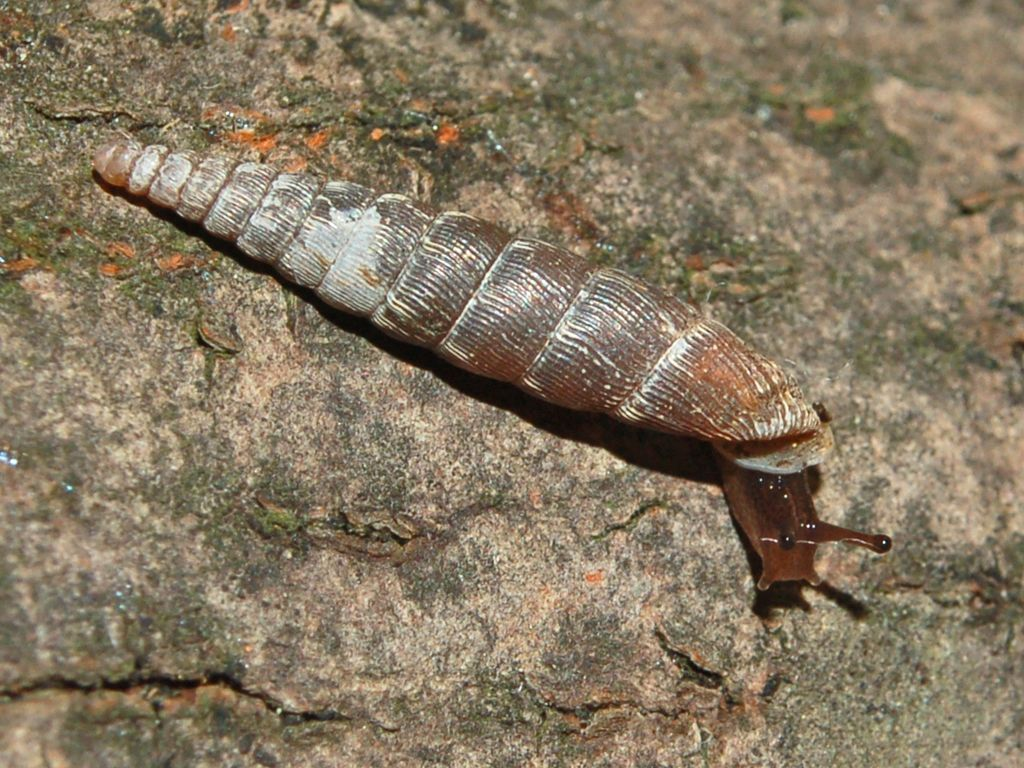
Lateral view of the shell of Clausilia bidentata crenulata.

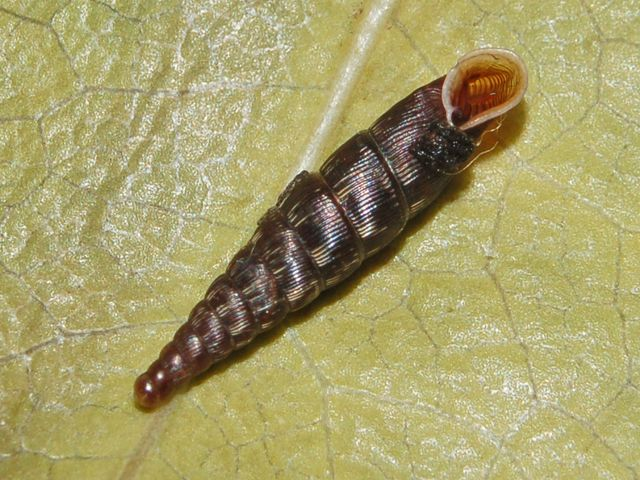
Clausilia bidentata var. crenulata.

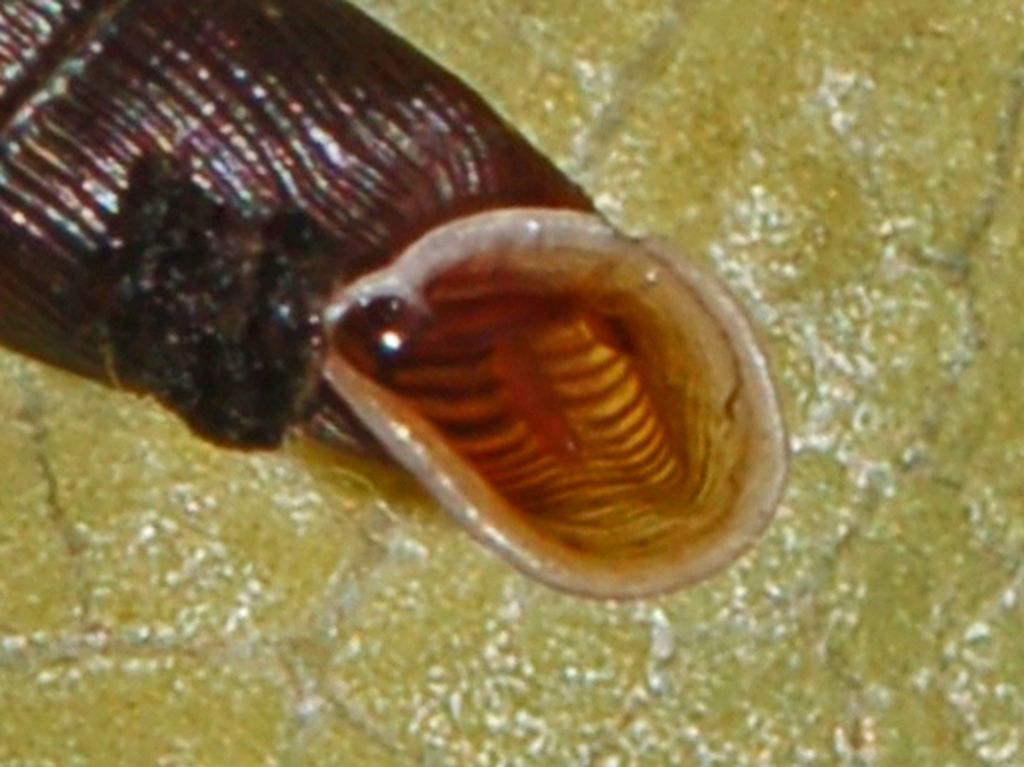
Clausilia bidentata var. crenulata, close-up.

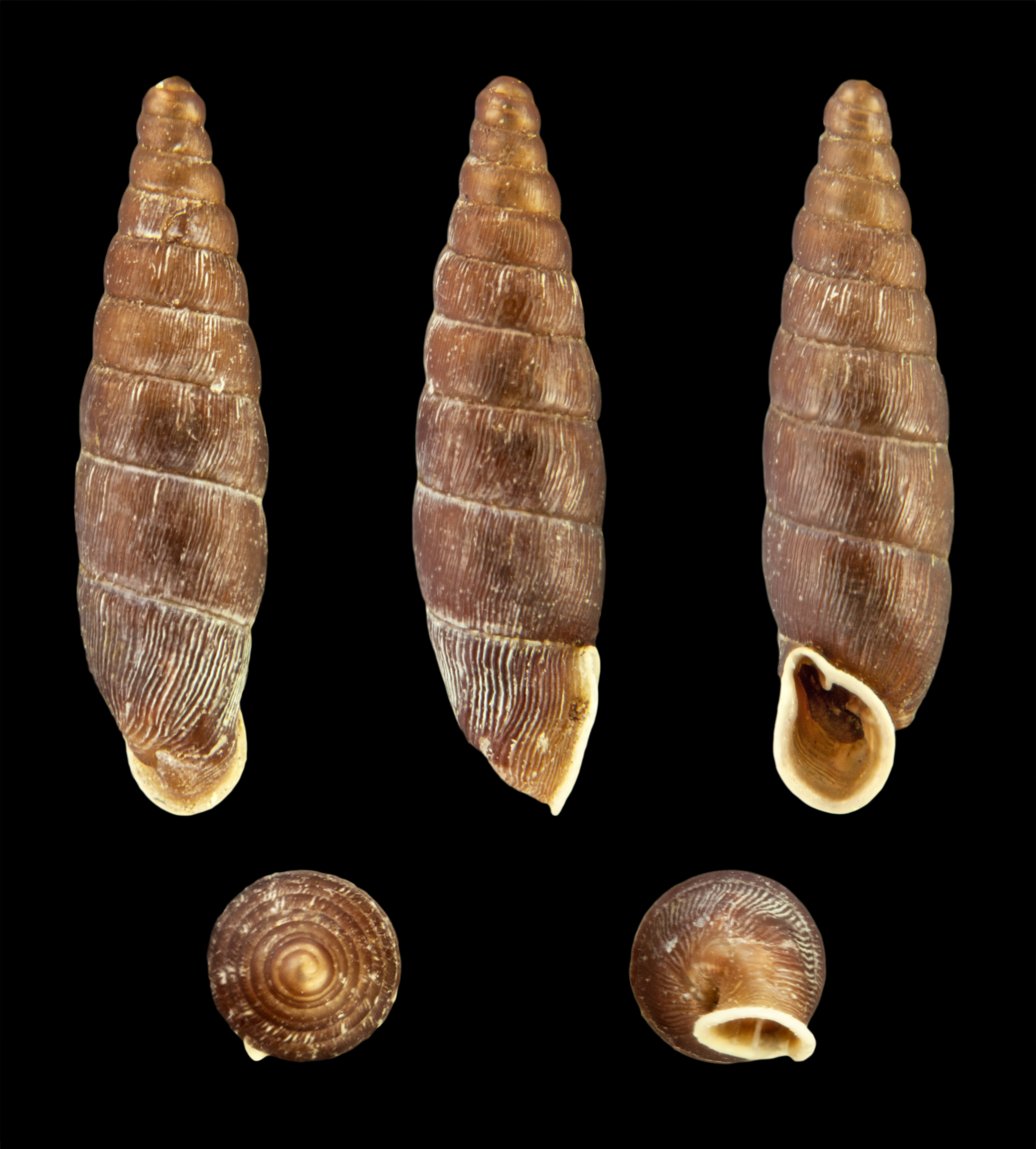
