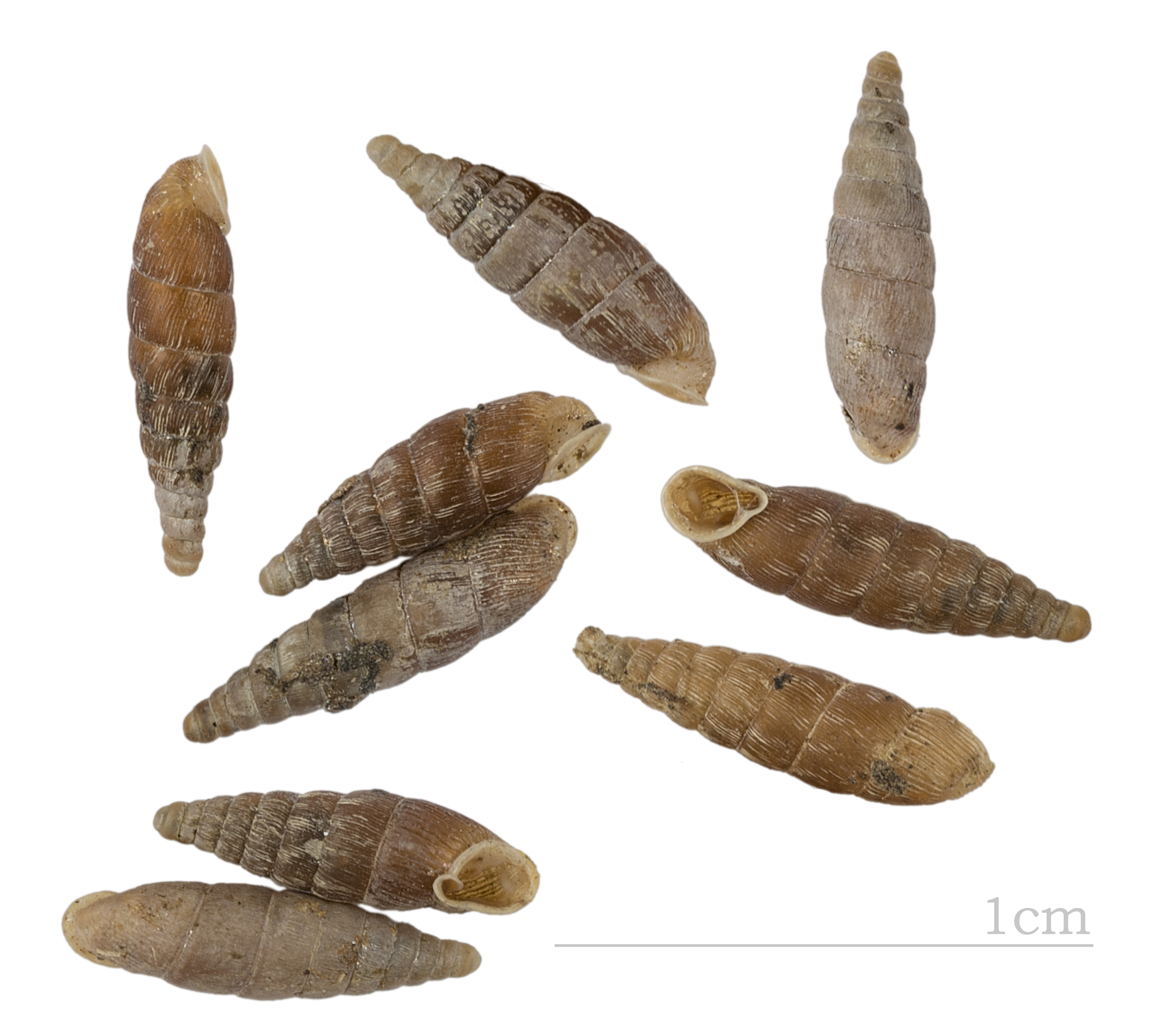
- Clausilia rugosa reboudii

Scientific classification
- Kingdom: Animalia
- Phylum: Mollusca
- Class: Gastropoda
- Order: Stylommatophora
- Family: Clausiliidae
- Genus: Clausilia
- Species: C. rugosa

Binomial name
- Clausilia rugosa (Draparnaud, 1801)

Synonyms
- Pupa rugosa Draparnaud, 1801; Clausilia parvula Férussac, 1807

= Clausilia rugosa =

Species of gastropod

Clausilia rugosa is a species of air-breathing land snails, a terrestrial pulmonate gastropod mollusc in the family Clausiliidae.

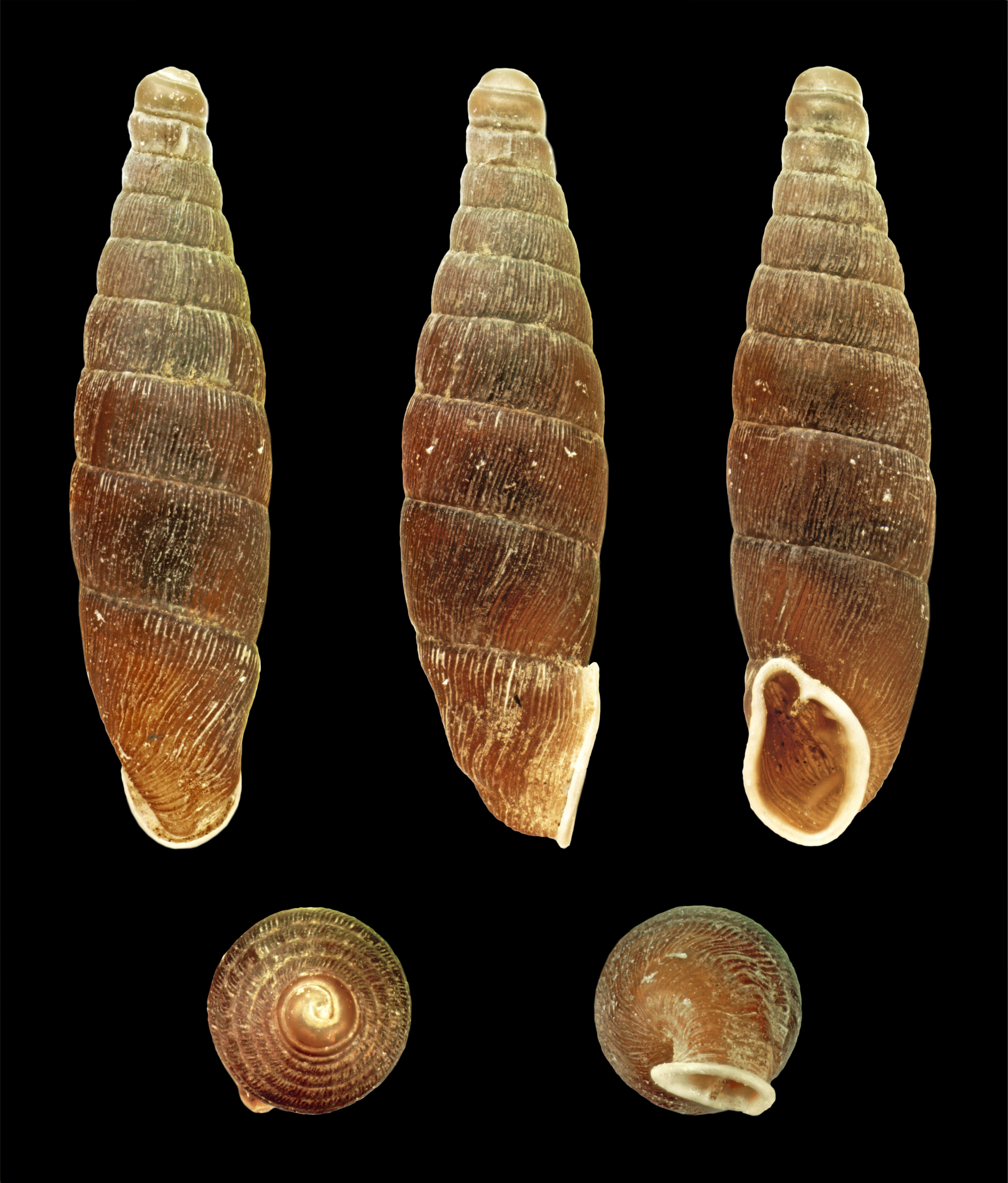

Subspecies

- Clausilia rugosa andusiensis Coutagne, 1886
- Clausilia rugosa belonidea Bourguignat, 1877
- Clausilia rugosa lamalouensis A. Letourneux, 1877
- Clausilia rugosa magdalenica Salvañá, 1887
- Clausilia rugosa parvula A. Férussac, 1807
- Clausilia rugosa penchinati Bourguignat, 1876
- Clausilia rugosa pinii Westerlund, 1878
- Clausilia rugosa provincialis Coutagne, 1886
- Clausilia rugosa reboudii Dupuy, 1851
- Clausilia rugosa rugosa (Draparnaud, 1801)

== Distribution ==
This species occurs in:

- Czech Republic
- France for Clausilia rugosa reboudii Dupuy, 1851
