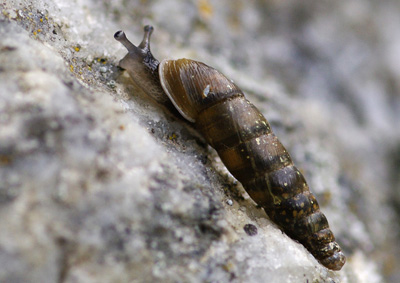
- A live Charpentieria dyodon

Scientific classification
- Kingdom: Animalia
- Phylum: Mollusca
- Class: Gastropoda
- Order: Stylommatophora
- Family: Clausiliidae
- Subfamily: Alopiinae
- Genus: Charpentieria; Stabile, 1864

Synonyms
- Alpidelima A.J. Wagner, 1924; Charpentieria (Charpentieria) Stabile, 1864· accepted, alternate representation; Charpentieria (Gibbularia) Cecconi, 1908· accepted, alternate representation; Charpentieria (Mauritanica) O. Boettger, 1879· accepted, alternate representation; Charpentieria (Siciliaria) Vest, 1867· accepted, alternate representation; Charpentieria (Stigmatica) O. Boettger, 1877· accepted, alternate representation; Delima (Siciliaria) Vest, 1867; Gibbula O. Boettger, 1877; Itala O. Boettger, 1877; Paestana Westerlund, 1884; Pedemontiana Pini, 1884; Piceata O. Boettger, 1877; Pollinia De Betta, 1870; Sicania Tomlin, 1929; Tirolica O. Boettger, 1877; Trinacria O. Boettger, 1877

= Charpentieria =

Genus of gastropods

Charpentieria is a genus of small, very elongate, air-breathing land snails, terrestrial pulmonate gastropod mollusks in the family Clausiliidae, the door snails, all of which have a clausilium.

== Species ==
Species within the genus Charpentiera include:

- Charpentieria calcarae (Philippi, 1844)
- Charpentieria clavata (Rossmässler, 1836)
- Charpentieria crassicostata (L. Pfeiffer, 1856)
- Charpentieria dyodon (S. Studer, 1820)
- Charpentieria eminens (A. Schmidt, 1868)
- Charpentieria ernae (Fauer, 1978)
- Charpentieria ferrox (R. A. Brandt, 1961)
- Charpentieria gibbula (Rossmässler, 1836)
- Charpentieria grohmanniana (Rossmässler, 1836)
- Charpentieria incerta (Küster, 1861)
- Charpentieria itala (G. von Martens, 1824)
- Charpentieria kobeltiana (Küster, 1876)
- Charpentieria lamellata (Rossmässler, 1836)
- Charpentieria leucophryna (L. Pfeiffer, 1862)
- Charpentieria nobilis (L. Pfeiffer, 1848)
- Charpentieria ornata (Rossmässler, 1836)
- Charpentieria paestana (Philippi, 1836)
- Charpentieria pantocratoris (O. Boettger, 1889)
- Charpentieria piceata (Rossmässler, 1836)
- Charpentieria riberothi (R. A. Brandt, 1961)
- Charpentieria scarificata (L. Pfeiffer, 1856)
- Charpentieria septemplicata (Philippi, 1836)
- Charpentieria spezialensis (H. Nordsieck, 1984)
- Charpentieria splendens (H. Nordsieck, 1996)
- Charpentieria stenzii (Rossmässler, 1836)
- Charpentieria stigmatica (Rossmässler, 1836)
- Charpentieria tiberii (A. Schmidt, 1868)
- Charpentieria vulcanica (Benoit, 1860)
