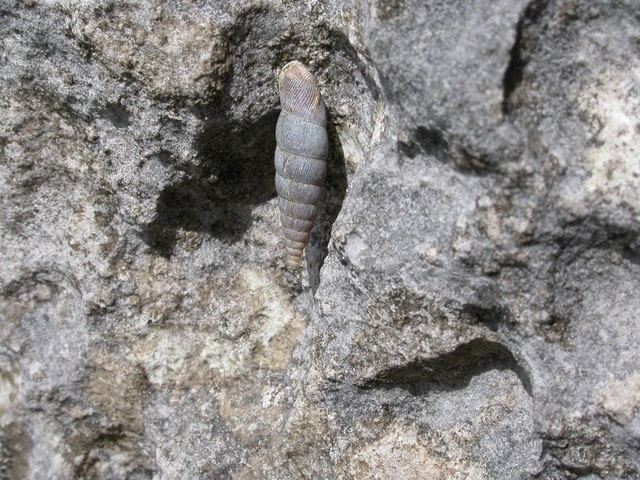

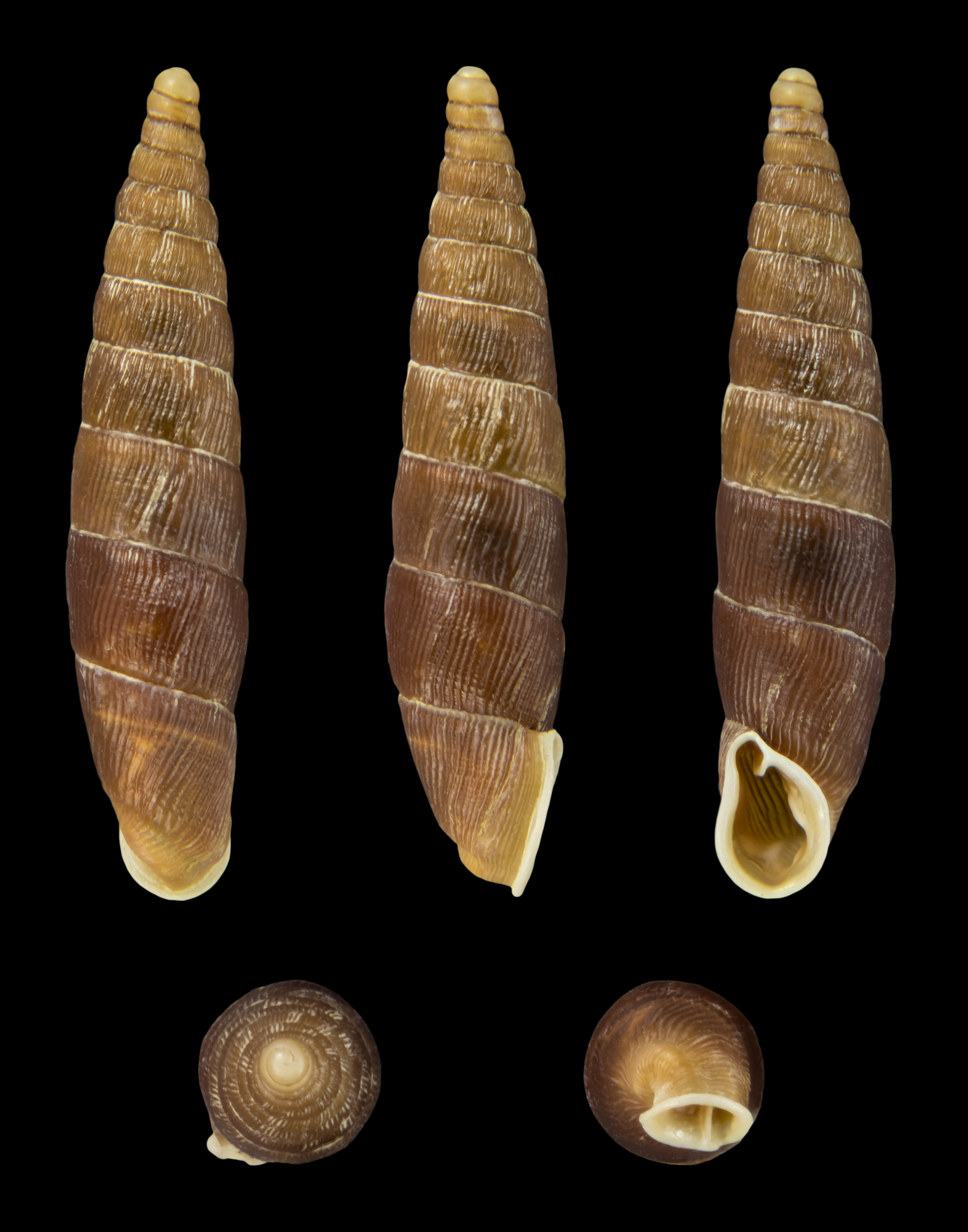

Conservation status
- Least Concern (IUCN 3.1)

Scientific classification
- Kingdom: Animalia
- Phylum: Mollusca
- Class: Gastropoda
- Order: Stylommatophora
- Family: Clausiliidae
- Genus: Clausilia
- Species: C. dubia

Binomial name
- Clausilia dubia Draparnaud, 1805

Synonyms
- Clausilia (Andraea) dubia Draparnaud, 1805· accepted, alternate representation; Clausilia (Clausilia) dubia Draparnaud, 1805

= Clausilia dubia =

Species of gastropod

Clausilia dubia is a species of small, very elongate, left-handed air-breathing land snail, a sinistral terrestrial pulmonate gastropod mollusk in the family Clausiliidae, the door snails, all of which have a clausilium.

== Subspecies ==
- Clausilia dubia alpicola Clessin, 1878
- Clausilia dubia bucculenta Klemm, 1960
- Clausilia dubia carpathica Brancsik, 1888
- Clausilia dubia dubia Draparnaud, 1805
- Clausilia dubia dydima F. J. Schmidt, 1847
- Clausilia dubia floningiana Westerlund, 1890
- Clausilia dubia geretica Bourguignat, 1877
- Clausilia dubia gracilior Clessin, 1887
- Clausilia dubia gratiosa Sajó, 1968
- Clausilia dubia grimmeri L. Pfeiffer, 1848
- Clausilia dubia huettneri Klemm, 1960
- Clausilia dubia ingenua Hudec & Brabenec, 1963
- Clausilia dubia kaeufeli Klemm, 1960
- Clausilia dubia otvinensis H. von Gallenstein, 1895
- Clausilia dubia runensis Tschapeck, 1883
- Clausilia dubia schlechtii A. Schmidt, 1856
- Clausilia dubia speciosa A. Schmidt, 1856
- Clausilia dubia suttoni Westerlund, 1881
- Clausilia dubia tettelbachiana Rossmässler, 1838
- Clausilia dubia vindobonensis A. Schmidt, 1856

== Distribution ==
The species is widespread in Europe, living in countries and islands including (among others):

- Austria
- Czech Republic
- Great Britain, the north of England
- Slovakia
- Ukraine

In Finland, as of 2019, the species is only known to live in two locations: the Ylistönmäki hill in Jyväskylä and the Kettuvuori hill in Heinola. Formerly, they had also been found on the Riihivuori hill in Muurame, but disappeared after a skiing center was built there. The species may have spread to Finland during a warm, rainy period in the 18th century.

== Description ==
All the species of snails in the family of door snails are left-handed, which is an uncommon feature in gastropods in general. These snails have shells which are extremely high-spired, with numerous whorls.

Clausilia dubia is a relatively large species for this family, reaching 16 mm in height.

The weight of the adult live snail is about 123 mg.
