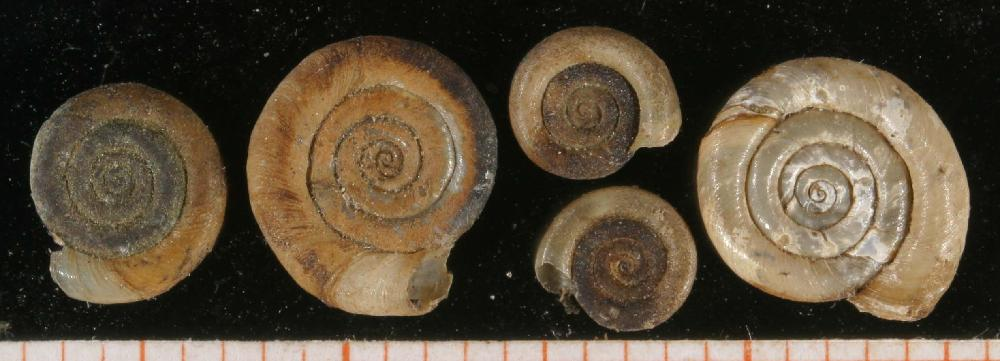
- Five shells of Anisus spirorbis

Scientific classification
- Kingdom: Animalia
- Phylum: Mollusca
- Class: Gastropoda
- Superorder: Hygrophila
- Family: Planorbidae
- Genus: Anisus
- Species: A. spirorbis

Binomial name
- Anisus spirorbis (Linnaeus, 1758)

Synonyms
- Anisus (Anisus) spirorbis (Linnaeus, 1758)· accepted, alternate representation; † Anisus depressissimus (Sacco, 1886) (junior synonym); Helix spirorbis Linnaeus, 1758; † Paraspira (Paraspira) depressissima (Sacco, 1886) (junior synonym); Paraspira (Paraspira) spirorbis (Linnaeus, 1758); Planorbis (Anisus) gyrorbis S. Studer, 1820 (junior synonym); † Planorbis depressissimus Sacco, 1886 (junior synonym); Planorbis spirorbis (Linnaeus, 1758)

= Anisus spirorbis =

Species of gastropod

Anisus spirorbis is a species of small freshwater air-breathing snail, an aquatic pulmonate gastropod mollusk in the family Planorbidae, the ram's horn snails.

== Taxonomy ==
Anisus spirorbis may be a broad-whorled morphotype of Anisus leucostoma.

== Distribution ==
Europe to Siberia.

This species occurs in countries that include:

- Czech Republic – vulnerable (VU)
- Slovakia
- Germany – high endangered (Stark gefährdet)
- Poland
- Ireland
- Great Britain
- Uzbekistan
- Siberia

== Description ==
The shell is 1 to 1.5 mm high and measures 4 to 5.5 mm in diameter. It has approximately 4.5 whorls. The mouth is oblique to the axis of the coil. The whorls are increase relatively rapidly (in relation to other Anisus species). The shell is yellowish horn coloured and bears thin growth strips. The body of the animal is grey-brownish black with lighter colored tentacles.

== Ecology ==
Parasites:

- This species serves as first intermediate host for Prosthogonimus ovatus
- Dendritobilharzia loossi – Anisus spirorbis is an intermediate host.
