= Bulgarica nitidosa =

Scientific classification
- Domain: Eukaryota
- Kingdom: Animalia
- Phylum: Mollusca
- Class: Gastropoda
- Order: Stylommatophora
- Family: Clausiliidae
- Genus: Bulgarica
- Species: B. nitidosa

Binomial name
- Bulgarica nitidosa (Uličný, 1893)

Species of gastropod

Bulgarica nitidosa is a species of air-breathing land snail, a terrestrial pulmonate gastropod mollusk in the family Clausiliidae, the door snails.

== Distribution ==
This species is endemic to Bohemia, in the Czech Republic.
