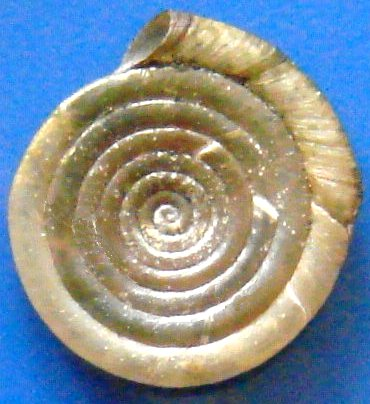
- Shell of Anisus septemgyratus

Scientific classification
- Domain: Eukaryota
- Kingdom: Animalia
- Phylum: Mollusca
- Class: Gastropoda
- Superorder: Hygrophila
- Family: Planorbidae
- Genus: Anisus
- Species: A. septemgyratus

Binomial name
- Anisus septemgyratus (Rossmässler, 1835)

Synonyms
- Planorbis septemgyratus Rossmässler, 1835

= Anisus septemgyratus =

Species of gastropod

Anisus septemgyratus is a species of air-breathing freshwater snail, an aquatic pulmonate gastropod mollusk in the family Planorbidae, the ram's horn snails.

== Taxonomy ==
Glöer (2002) considered Anisus septemgyratus (Rossmässler, 1835) as a junior synonym of Anisus leucostoma (Millet, 1813). Later Glöer & Meier-Brook (2008) used name Anisus septemgyratus again.

Horsák et al. (2013) consider Anisus calculiformis (Sandberger, 1874) as a synonym of Anisus septemgyratus.

== Distribution ==
This species occurs in countries and islands including:

- Czech Republic – in Moravia, critically endangered (CR)
- Slovakia
- Poland
- British Isles

== Description ==
The number of prostate diverticles ranges from 30 to more than 50.
