= List of non-marine molluscs of the Czech Republic =

Location of the Czech Republic

This is a list of the non-marine molluscs of the Czech Republic. As the Czech Republic is a landlocked country it has no marine molluscs, only land and freshwater species, including snails, slugs, freshwater clams and freshwater mussels. There are 247 species of molluscs living in the wild in the Czech Republic. In addition there are at least 11 gastropod species surviving in greenhouses.

There are 219 gastropod species (50 freshwater and 169 land species) and 28 bivalve species living in the wild.

There are also 11 introduced gastropod species (5 freshwater and 7 land species) and 4 bivalve species living in the wild in the Czech Republic. This is a total of 9 freshwater non-indigenous species living in natural habitats.

== Summary table of number of species ==
	Bohemia	Moravia + Czech Silesia	the Czech Republic
freshwater gastropods	44	44	50
land gastropods	155	151	169
gastropods altogether	199	195	219
bivalves	28	27	28
molluscs altogether	227	222	247
non-indigenous gastropods in natural habitats	6 freshwater and 10 land	4 freshwater and 5 land	5 freshwater (Bithynia troschelii is non-indigenous in Bohemia and indigenous in Moravia) and 7 land (2 are in Moravia only, 3 are in both, 7 are in Bohemia only)
non-indigenous gastropods in synantropic habitats			11
non-indigenous bivalves in natural habitats	3	1	3
non-indigenous bivalves in synantropic habitats	0	0	0
non-indigenous molluscs altogether			26

There are 2 endemic species of molluscs in the Czech Republic:

- Alzoniella slovenica in Moravia (and in Slovakia too)
- Bulgarica nitidosa in Bohemia.

== History ==
Historical lists from 19th century or overviews of Czech malacofauna include works by Schöbl (1860), Slavík (1868) and Uličný (1892–95).

Lists by Vojen Ložek include work Ložek (1948) for Bohemia. Following works include lists for whole Czechoslovakia for recent species: Ložek (1949), Ložek (1956) and list including Quaternary species: Ložek (1964).

Lists for freshwater species include: Beran (1998) and Beran (2002).

Conservation status of all 237 species include list by Juřičková et al. (2001). There is also available red list based on that 2001 list. Threatened species only include list by Beran et al. (2005). List by Juřičková et al. (2008) has included 245 species. List by Horsák et al. (2010) has included 247 species.

== Freshwater gastropods ==
There are only families and species in the list. The Czech name is in parentheses. Listed is the occurrence in Bohemia or in Moravia (and if it is a non-indigenous or locally extinct species). Non-indigenous species only occurring in greenhouses in the Czech Republic are noted separately after the list. Freshwater gastropods in the Czech Republic include:

Neritidae

- (zubovec dunajský) Theodoxus danubialis (C. Pfeiffer, 1828) – Moravia
- (zubovec říční) Theodoxus fluviatilis (Linnaeus, 1758) – Bohemia locally extinct

Viviparidae

- (bahenka uherská) Viviparus acerosus (Bourguignat, 1862) – Moravia
- (bahenka živorodá) Viviparus contectus (Millet, 1813) – Bohemia, Moravia
- (bahenka pruhovaná) Viviparus viviparus (Linnaeus, 1758) – Bohemia

Hydrobiidae

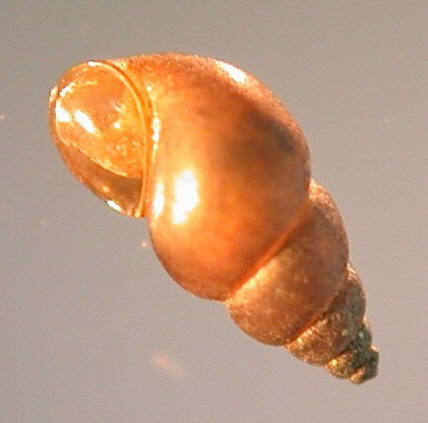
The introduced freshwater gastropod Potamopyrgus antipodarum

- (písečník novozélandský) Potamopyrgus antipodarum (Gray, 1843) – non-indigenous, Bohemia, Moravia
- (vývěrka slovenská) Alzoniella slovenica (Ložek & Brtek, 1964) – Moravia endemic

Amnicolidae

- (praménka rakouská) Bythinella austriaca (von Frauenfeld, 1857) agg. – Bohemia, Moravia

Lithoglyphidae

- (kamolep říční) Lithoglyphus naticoides (C. Pfeiffer, 1828) – Moravia

Bithyniidae

- (bahnivka nadmutá) Bithynia leachii (Sheppard, 1823) – Moravia
- (bahnivka rmutná) Bithynia tentaculata (Linnaeus, 1758) – Bohemia, Moravia
- (bahnivka nadmutá) Bithynia troschelii (Paasch, 1842) – non-indigenous in Bohemia, native in Moravia. It was thought to be locally extinct in Moravia. It was rediscovered in 2008.

Valvatidae

- (točenka plochá) Valvata cristata O. F. Müller, 1774 – Bohemia, Moravia
- (točenka veleústá) Valvata macrostoma Mörch, 1864 – Bohemia
- (točenka kulovitá) Valvata piscinalis (O. F. Müller, 1774) – Bohemia, Moravia

Acroloxidae

- (člunice jezerní) Acroloxus lacustris (Linnaeus, 1758) – Bohemia, Moravia

Lymnaeidae

- (bahnatka malá) Galba truncatula (O. F. Müller, 1774) – Bohemia, Moravia
- (blatenka tmavá) Stagnicola corvus (Gmelin, 1791) – Bohemia, Moravia
- (blatenka rybničná) Stagnicola fuscus (C. Pfeiffer, 1821) – Bohemia
- (blatenka bažinná) Stagnicola palustris (O. F. Müller, 1774) – Bohemia, Moravia
- (blatenka severní) Catascopia occulta (Jackiewicz, 1959) – Bohemia, Moravia
- (uchatka široká) Radix ampla (Hartmann, 1821) – Bohemia, Moravia
- (uchatka nadmutá) Radix auricularia (Linnaeus, 1758) – Bohemia, Moravia
- (uchatka vejčitá) Radix ovata (Draparnaud, 1805) – Bohemia, Moravia
- (uchatka toulavá) Radix peregra (O. F. Müller, 1774) – Bohemia, Moravia
- (pláštěnka sliznatá) Myxas glutinosa (O. F. Müller, 1774) – Bohemia locally extinct
- (plovatka bahenní) Lymnaea stagnalis (Linnaeus, 1758) – Bohemia, Moravia

Physidae

- (levotočka bažinná) Aplexa hypnorum (Linnaeus, 1758) – Bohemia, Moravia
- (levatka říční) Physa fontinalis (Linnaeus, 1758) – Bohemia, Moravia
- (levatka ostrá) Physella acuta (Draparnaud, 1805) – non-indigenous in Bohemia, non-indigenous in Moravia

Planorbidae

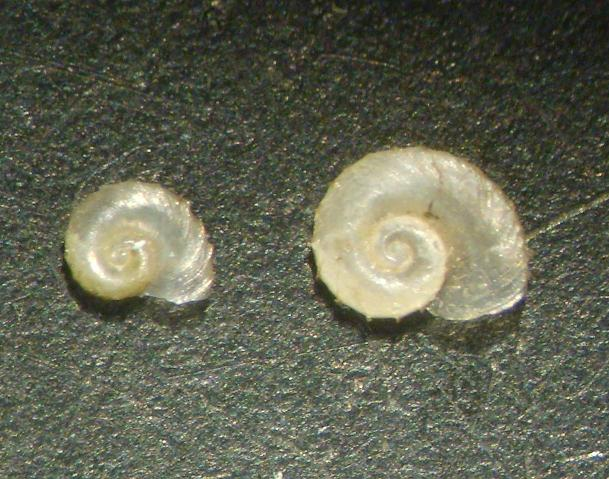
Gyraulus crista

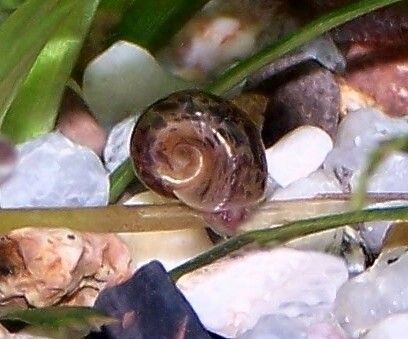
Planorbarius corneus

- (terčovník kýlnatý) Planorbis carinatus O. F. Müller, 1774 – Bohemia, Moravia
- (terčovník vroubený) Planorbis planorbis (Linnaeus, 1758) – Bohemia, Moravia
- (svinutec běloústý) Anisus leucostoma (Millet, 1813) – Bohemia, Moravia
- (svinutec sedmitočný) Anisus septemgyratus (Rossmässler, 1835) – Moravia
- (svinutec kruhovitý) Anisus spirorbis (Linnaeus, 1758) – Bohemia, Moravia
- (svinutec zploštělý) Anisus vortex (Linnaeus, 1758) – Bohemia, Moravia
- (svinutec tenký) Anisus vorticulus (Troschel, 1834) – Bohemia, Moravia
- (řemeník svinutý) Bathyomphalus contortus (Linnaeus, 1758) – Bohemia, Moravia
- (kružník severní) Gyraulus acronicus (A. Férussac, 1807) – Bohemia, Moravia
- (kružník bělavý) Gyraulus albus (O. F. Müller, 1774) – Bohemia, Moravia
- (kružník žebrovaný) Gyraulus crista (Linnaeus, 1758) – Bohemia, Moravia
- (kružník hladký) Gyraulus laevis (Alder, 1838) – Bohemia, Moravia
- (kružník malý) Gyraulus parvus (Say, 1817) – non-indigenous in Bohemia, non-indigenous in Moravia
- (kružník Rossmasslerův) Gyraulus rossmaessleri (Auerswald, 1852) – Bohemia, Moravia
- (kýlnatec čočkovitý) Hippeutis complanatus (Linnaeus, 1758) – Bohemia, Moravia
- (lištovka lesklá) Segmentina nitida (O. F. Müller, 1774) – Bohemia, Moravia
- (okružák ploský) Planorbarius corneus (Linnaeus, 1758) – Bohemia, Moravia
- (menetovník rozšířený) Menetus dilatatus (Gould, 1841) – non-indigenous in Bohemia
- (kamomil říční) Ancylus fluviatilis O. F. Müller, 1774 – Bohemia, Moravia
- (člunka pravohrotá) Ferrissia fragilis (Tryon, 1863) – non-indigenous in Bohemia since 1942, non-indigenous in Moravia, synonyms: Ferrissia wautieri (Mirolli, 1960); Ferrissia clessiniana (Jickeli, 1882) part.

== Land gastropods ==
Land gastropods in the Czech Republic include:

Aciculidae

- (jehlovka malinká) Acicula parcelineata (Clessin, 1911) – Moravia
- (jehlovka hladká) Platyla polita (Hartmann, 1840) – Bohemia, Moravia

Ellobiidae

- (síměnka nejmenší) Carychium minimum O. F. Müller, 1774 – Bohemia, Moravia
- (síměnka trojzubá) Carychium tridentatum (Risso, 1826) – Bohemia, Moravia

Cochlicopidae

- (oblovka lesklá) Cochlicopa lubrica (O. F. Müller, 1774) – Bohemia, Moravia
- (oblovka drobná) Cochlicopa lubricella (Rossmässler, 1835) – Bohemia, Moravia
- (oblovka velká) Cochlicopa nitens (M. von Gallenstein, 1848) – Bohemia, Moravia

Orculidae

- (sudovka skalní) Orcula dolium (Draparnaud, 1801) – Moravia
- (sudovka žebernatá) Sphyradium doliolum (Bruguière, 1792) – Bohemia, Moravia

Chondrinidae

- (žitovka obilná) Granaria frumentum (Drapanaud, 1801) – Bohemia, Moravia
- (ovsenka skalní) Chondrina avenacea (Bruguière, 1792) – Bohemia
- (ovsenka žebernatá) Chondrina clienta (Westerlund, 1883) – Bohemia, Moravia

Pupillidae

- (zrnovka slatinná) Pupilla pratensis (Clessin, 1871) Pupilla pratensis was elevated to its species level in 2009. The later revision showed that Pupilla alpicola does not live in the Czech Republic and all of them are Pupilla pratensis in that country. Pupilla alpicola (Charpentier, 1837) (in Czech: zrnovka alpská) has been listed as a part of fauna of the Czech Republic for a long time (as probably extinct in Bohemia and critically endangered (CR) in Moravia).
- (zrnovka mechová) Pupilla muscorum (Linnaeus, 1758) – Bohemia, Moravia
- (zrnovka žebernatá) Pupilla sterrii (Voith, 1840) – Bohemia, Moravia
- (zrnovka třízubá) Pupilla triplicata (Studer, 1820) – Bohemia, Moravia

Pyramidulidae

- (kuželovka skalní) Pyramidula pusilla (Vallot, 1801) – Bohemia, Moravia

Valloniidae

- (údolníček žebernatý) Vallonia costata (O. F. Müller, 1774) – Bohemia, Moravia
- (údolníček velký) Vallonia declivis Sterki, 1892 – Bohemia
- (údolníček rýhovaný) Vallonia enniensis (Gredler, 1856) – Bohemia, Moravia
- (údolníček šikmý) Vallonia excentrica Sterki, 1893 – Bohemia, Moravia
- (údolníček drobný) Vallonia pulchella (O. F. Müller, 1774) – Bohemia, Moravia
- (ostnatka trnitá) Acanthinula aculeata (O. F. Müller, 1774) – Bohemia, Moravia

Vertiginidae

- (ostroústka drsná) Columella aspera Waldén, 1966 – Bohemia, Moravia
- (ostroústka bezzubá) Columella edentula (Draparnaud, 1805) – Bohemia, Moravia
- (drobnička jižní) Truncatellina claustralis (Gredler, 1856) – Bohemia, Moravia
- (drobnička žebernatá) Truncatellina costulata (Nilsson, 1823) – Bohemia, Moravia
- (drobnička válcovitá) Truncatellina cylindrica (A. Férussac, 1807) – Bohemia, Moravia
- (vrkoč horský) Vertigo alpestris Alder, 1838 – Bohemia, Moravia
- (vrkoč útlý) Vertigo angustior Jeffreys, 1830 – Bohemia, Moravia
- (vrkoč mnohozubý) Vertigo antivertigo (Draparnaud, 1801) – Bohemia, Moravia
- (vrkoč Geyerův) Vertigo geyeri Lindholm, 1925 – Bohemia
- (vrkoč rašelinný) Vertigo lilljeborgi (Westerlund, 1871) – Bohemia, Moravia
- (vrkoč bažinný) Vertigo moulinsiana (Dupuy, 1849) – Bohemia, Moravia
- (vrkoč lesní) Vertigo pusilla O. F. Müller, 1774 – Bohemia, Moravia
- (vrkoč malinký) Vertigo pygmaea (Draparnaud, 1801) – Bohemia, Moravia
- (vrkoč nordický) Vertigo ronnebyensis (Westerlund, 1871) – Bohemia
- (vrkoč rýhovaný) Vertigo substriata (Jeffreys, 1833) – Bohemia, Moravia

Enidae

- (trojzubka stepní) Chondrula tridens (O. F. Müller, 1774) – Bohemia, Moravia
- (hladovka horská) Ena montana (Draparnaud, 1801) – Bohemia, Moravia
- (hladovka chlumní) Merdigera obscura (O. F. Müller, 1774) – Bohemia, Moravia
- (lačník stepní) Zebrina detrita (O. F. Müller, 1774) – Bohemia, Moravia

Clausiliidae

Balea biplicata is most common species of the family Clausiliidae in the Czech Republic

- (vřetenovka vosková opavská) Cochlodina cerata opaviensis Brabenec & Mácha, 1960 – Moravia
- (vřetenovka zaměněná) Cochlodina costata commutata (Rossmässler, 1836) – Bohemia, Moravia
- (vřetenovka utajená krkonošská) Cochlodina dubiosa corcontica Brabenec, 1967 – Bohemia
- (vřetenovka hladká) Cochlodina laminata (Montagu, 1803) – Bohemia, Moravia
- (vřetenovka rovnoústá) Cochlodina orthostoma (Menke, 1828) – Bohemia, Moravia
- (zdobenka tečkovaná) Charpentieria ornata (Rossmässler, 1836) – Bohemia, Moravia
- (žebernatěnka drobná) Ruthenica filograna (Rossmässler, 1836) – Bohemia, Moravia
- (vřetenec horský) Pseudofusulus varians (C. Pfeiffer, 1828) – Bohemia, locally extinct in Moravia
- (řasnatka tmavá) Macrogastra badia (C. Pfeiffer, 1828) – Bohemia, Moravia
- (řasnatka žebernatá) Macrogastra borealis (Boettger, 1878) – syn. Macrogastra latestriata (A. Schmidt, 1857) – Moravia
- (řasnatka lesní) Macrogastra plicatula (Draparnaud, 1801) – Bohemia, Moravia
- (řasnatka nadmutá) Macrogastra tumida (Rossmässler, 1836) – Bohemia, Moravia
- (řasnatka břichatá) Macrogastra ventricosa (Draparnaud, 1801) – Bohemia, Moravia
- (závornatka černavá) Clausilia bidentata (Strøm, 1765) – Bohemia
- (závornatka křížatá) Clausilia cruciata (Studer, 1820) – Bohemia, Moravia
- (závornatka drsná) Clausilia dubia Draparnaud, 1805 – Bohemia, Moravia
- (závornatka malá) Clausilia rugosa (Draparnaud, 1801) – syn. Clausilia parvula Férussac, 1807 – Bohemia, Moravia
- (závornatka kyjovitá) Clausilia pumila C. Pfeiffer, 1828 – Bohemia, Moravia
- (vřetenatka mnohozubá) Laciniaria plicata (Draparnaud, 1801) – Bohemia, Moravia
- (vřetenatka obecná) Balea biplicata (Montagu, 1803) – Bohemia, Moravia – synonym: Alinda biplicata
- (hrotice obrácená) Balea perversa (Linnaeus, 1758) – Bohemia, Moravia
- (vřetenatka hrubá) Vestia gulo (E. A. Bielz, 1859) – Moravia
- (vřetenatka Ranojevičova moravská) Vestia ranojevici moravica (Brabenec, 1952) – Moravia
- (vřetenatka nadmutá) Vestia turgida (Rossmässler, 1836) – Bohemia, Moravia
- (vřetenatka šedavá) Bulgarica cana (Held, 1836) – Bohemia, Moravia
- (vřetenatka lesklá) Bulgarica nitidosa (Uličný, 1893) – Bohemia endemic

Succineidae

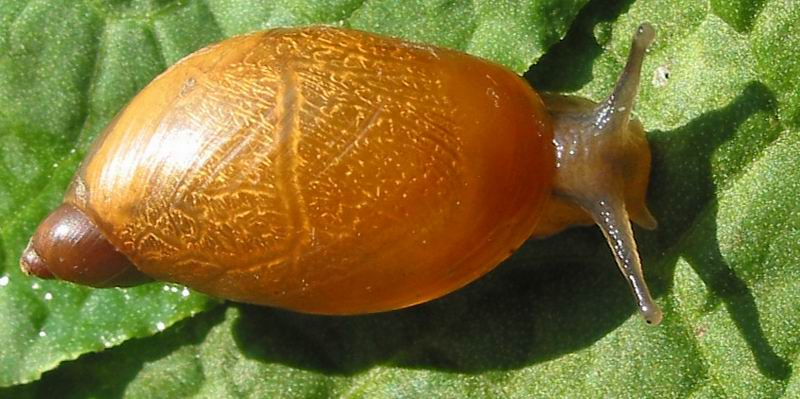
Succinea putris

- (jantarka podlouhlá) Succinella oblonga (Draparnaud, 1801) – Bohemia, Moravia
- (jantarka obecná) Succinea putris (Linnaeus, 1758) – Bohemia, Moravia
- (jantarka úhledná) Oxyloma elegans (Risso, 1826) – Bohemia, Moravia

Ferussaciidae

- (bezočka šídlovitá) Cecilioides acicula (O. F. Müller, 1774) – Bohemia, Moravia

Punctidae

- (boděnka malinká) Punctum pygmaeum (Draparnaud, 1801) – Bohemia, Moravia

Helicodiscidae

- (spirálovníček zemní) Lucilla scintilla (Lowe, 1852) – Bohemia, non-indigenous

Discidae

- (vrásenka orlojovitá) Discus perspectivus (M. von Mühlfeld, 1816) – Bohemia, Moravia
- (vrásenka okrouhlá) Discus rotundatus (O. F. Müller, 1774) – Bohemia, Moravia
- (vrásenka pomezní) Discus ruderatus (A. Férussac, 1821) – Bohemia, Moravia

Gastrodontidae

- (zemounek lesní) Zonitoides arboreus (Say, 1816) – non-indigenous in Moravia since 2006
- (zemounek lesklý) Zonitoides nitidus (O. F. Müller, 1774) – Bohemia, Moravia

Euconulidae

- (kuželík tmavý) Euconulus praticola (Reinhardt, 1883) – Bohemia, Moravia
- (kuželík drobný) Euconulus fulvus (O. F. Müller, 1774) – Bohemia, Moravia

Oxychilidae

- (sítovka podhorská) Aegopinella epipedostoma (Fagot, 1879) – Moravia
- (sítovka suchomilná) Aegopinella minor (Stabile, 1864) – Bohemia, Moravia
- (sítovka blýštivá) Aegopinella nitens (Michaud, 1831) – Bohemia, Moravia
- (sítovka lesklá) Aegopinella nitidula (Draparnaud, 1805) – Bohemia, Moravia
- (sítovka čistá) Aegopinella pura (Alder, 1830) – Bohemia, Moravia
- (sítovka dravá) Aegopinella ressmanni (Westerlund, 1883) – Bohemia, since 2007
- (blyštivka rýhovaná) Perpolita hammonis (Strøm, 1765) – Bohemia, Moravia
- (blyštivka skleněná) Perpolita petronella (L. Pfeiffer, 1853) – Bohemia, Moravia
- (skelnatka česneková) Oxychilus alliarius (Miller, 1822) – Bohemia
- (skelnatka drnová) Oxychilus cellarius (O. F. Müller, 1774) – Bohemia, Moravia
- (skelnatka stlačená) Oxychilus depressus (Sterki, 1880) – Bohemia, Moravia
- (skelnatka západní) Oxychilus draparnaudi (Beck, 1837) – Bohemia non-indigenous, Moravia non-indigenous
- (skelnatka hladká) Oxychilus glaber (Rossmässler, 1835) – Bohemia, Moravia
- (skelnatka zemní) Oxychilus inopinatus (Uličný, 1887) – Bohemia, Moravia
- (skelnatka horská) Oxychilus mortilleti (L. Pfeiffer, 1859) – Bohemia
- (sklovatka krátkonohá) Daudebardia brevipes (Draparnaud, 1805) – Bohemia, Moravia
- (sklovatka rudá) Daudebardia rufa (Draparnaud, 1805) – Bohemia, Moravia

Pristilomatidae

- (skelnička stažená) Vitrea contracta (Westerlund, 1871) – Bohemia, Moravia
- (skelnička průhledná) Vitrea crystallina (O. F. Müller, 1774) – Bohemia, Moravia
- (skelnička průzračná) Vitrea diaphana (Studer, 1820) – Bohemia, Moravia
- (skelnička zjizvená) Vitrea subrimata (Reinhardt, 1871) – Bohemia, Moravia
- (skelnička karpatská) Vitrea transsylvanica (Clessin, 1877) – Bohemia, Moravia

Vitrinidae

- (skleněnka průsvitná) Vitrina pellucida (O. F. Müller, 1774) – Bohemia, Moravia
- (slimáčnice průhledná) Eucobresia diaphana (Draparnaud, 1805) – Bohemia, Moravia
- (slimáčnice lesní) Eucobresia nivalis (Dumont & Mortillet, 1854) – Bohemia, Moravia
- (slimáčník horský) Semilimax kotulae (Westerlund, 1883) – Bohemia, Moravia
- (slimáčník táhlý) Semilimax semilimax (J. Férussac, 1802) – Bohemia, Moravia

Zonitidae

- (zemoun skalní) Aegopis verticillus (Lamarck, 1822) – Bohemia, Moravia

Milacidae

- (plžice štíhlá) Tandonia budapestensis (Hazay, 1881) – Bohemia, Moravia
- (plžice vroubená) Tandonia rustica (Millet, 1843) – Bohemia

Limacidae

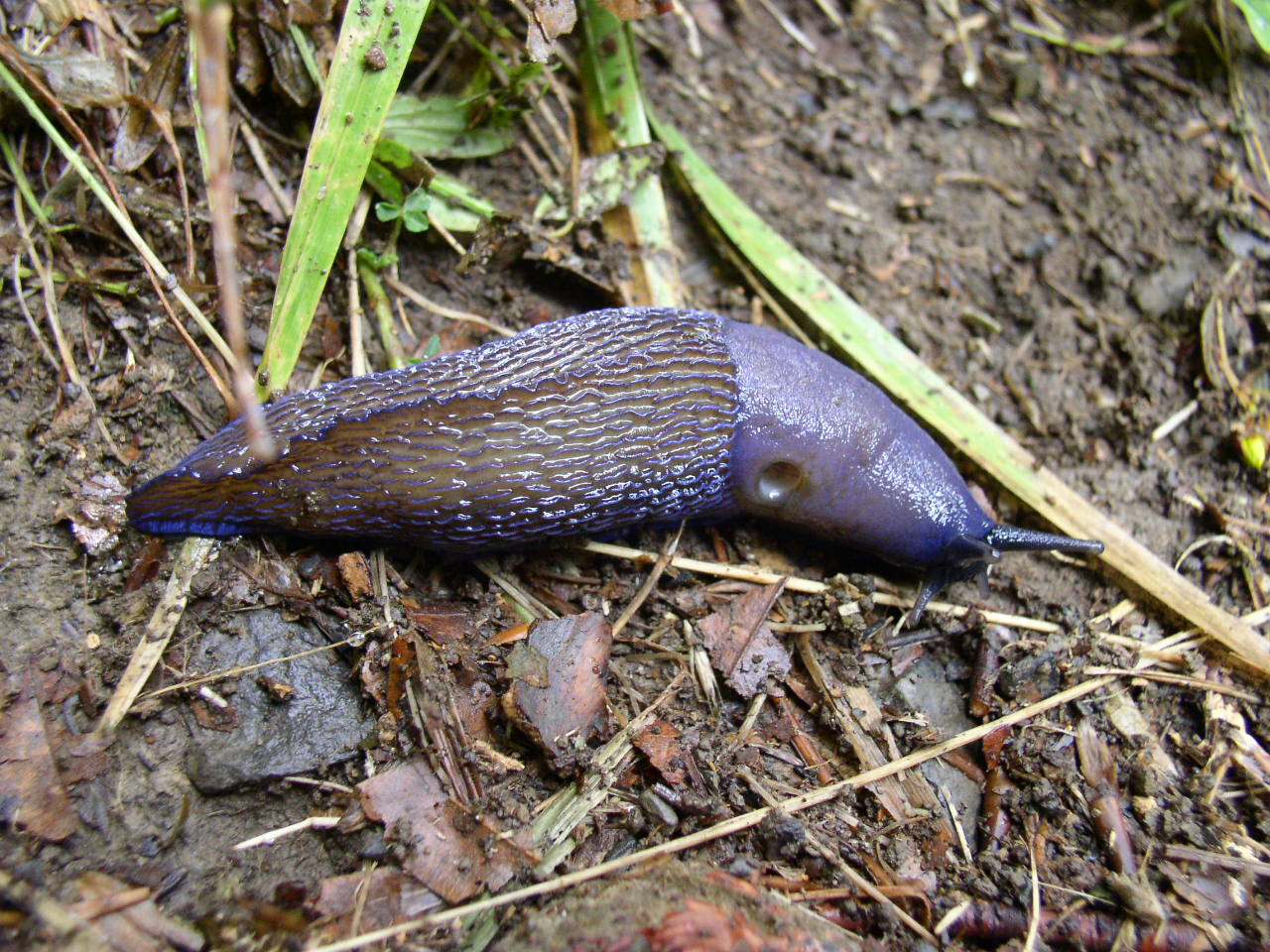
Bielzia coerulans

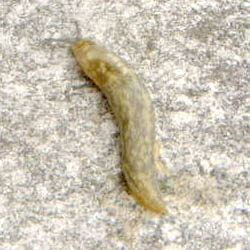
Limacus flavus

- (modranka karpatská) Bielzia coerulans (M. Bielz, 1851) – Moravia
- (slimák popelavý) Limax cinereoniger Wolf, 1803 – Bohemia, Moravia
- (slimák největší) Limax maximus Linnaeus, 1758 – Bohemia, Moravia
- (slimák pestrý) Limacus flavus (Linnaeus, 1758) – Bohemia, Moravia
- (slimák žlutý) Malacolimax tenellus (O. F. Müller, 1774) – Bohemia, Moravia
- (podkornatka karpatská) Lehmannia macroflagellata Grossu & Lupu, 1962 – Bohemia, Moravia
- (podkornatka žíhaná) Lehmannia marginata (O. F. Müller, 1774) – Bohemia, Moravia
- (podkornatka jižní) Lehmannia carpatica Hutchinson, Reise & Schlitt, 2022 – Moravia

Agriolimacidae

- (slimáček polní) Deroceras agreste (Linnaeus, 1758) – Bohemia, Moravia
- (slimáček hladký) Deroceras laeve (O. F. Müller, 1774) – Bohemia, Moravia
- (slimáček středomořský) Deroceras invadens Reise, Hutchinson, Schunack & Schlitt, 2011 – non-indigenous Moravia since 2003, Bohemia since 2014
- (slimáček lesní) Deroceras praecox Wiktor, 1966 – Bohemia, Moravia
- (slimáček síťkovaný) Deroceras reticulatum (O. F. Müller, 1774) – Bohemia, Moravia
- (slimáček světlý) Deroceras rodnae Grossu & Lupu, 1965 – Bohemia, Moravia
- (slimáček evropský) Deroceras sturanyi (Simroth, 1894) – Bohemia, Moravia
- (slimáček balkánský) Deroceras turcicum (Simroth, 1894) – Bohemia, Moravia

Boettgerillidae

- (blednička útlá) Boettgerilla pallens Simroth, 1912 – Bohemia non-indigenous, Moravia non-indigenous

Arionidae

- (plzák alpský) Arion obesoductus Reischütz, 1973 – synonym: Arion alpinus auctt. non-Pollonera, 1887 – Bohemia, Moravia
- (plzák žíhaný) Arion circumscriptus Johnston, 1828 – Bohemia, Moravia
- (plzák obecný) Arion distinctus Mabille, 1868 – Bohemia, Moravia
- (plzák žlutopruhý) Arion fasciatus (Nilsson, 1823) – Bohemia, Moravia
- (plzák nejmenší) Arion intermedius (Normand, 1852) – Bohemia, Moravia
- (plzák španělský) Arion vulgaris (Moquin-Tandon, 1855) – non-indigenous since 1991, Bohemia non-indigenous, Moravia non-indigenous
- (plzák lesní) Arion rufus (Linnaeus, 1758) – Bohemia, Moravia
- (plzák hajní) Arion silvaticus Lohmander, 1937 – Bohemia, Moravia
- (plzák hnědý) Arion fuscus (O. F. Müller, 1774) – Bohemia, Moravia

Bradybaenidae

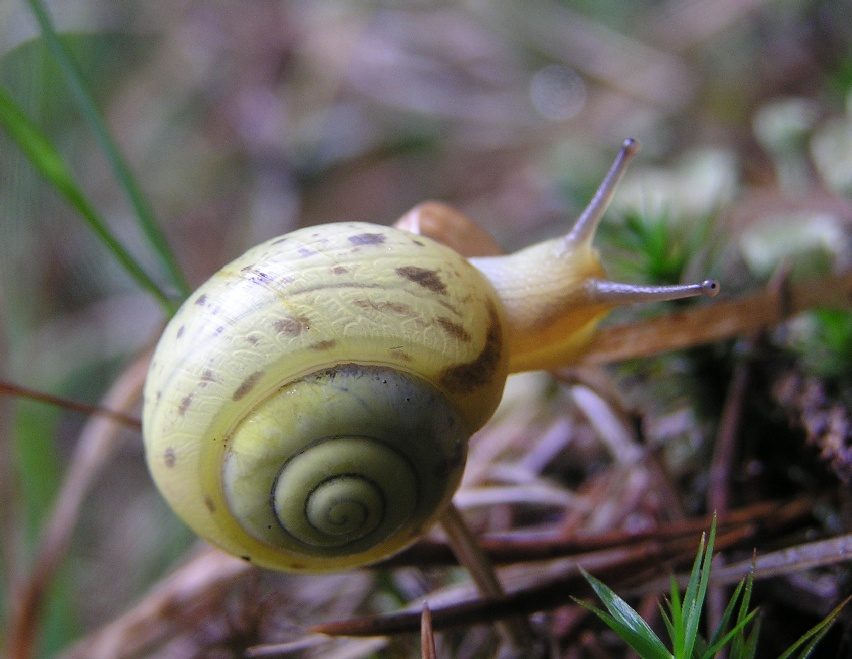
Fruticicola fruticum

- (keřovka plavá) Fruticicola fruticum (O. F. Müller, 1774) – Bohemia, Moravia

Helicodontidae

- (trojlaločka pyskatá) Helicodonta obvoluta (O. F. Müller, 1774) – Bohemia, Moravia

Hygromiidae

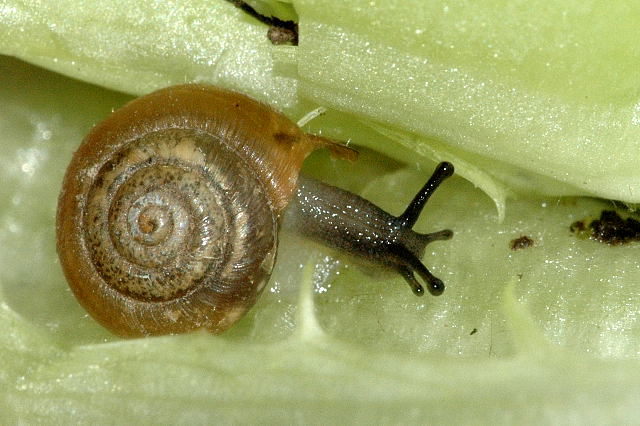
Trochulus hispidus

- (keřnatka vrásčitá) Euomphalia strigella (Draparnaud, 1801) – Bohemia, Moravia
- (tmavoretka kentská) Monacha cantiana (Montagu, 1803) – claimed to be non-indigenous in Bohemia since 2009, but based on a misidentification of M. claustralis
- Monacha claustralis (Rossmässler, 1834) – but distinction from M. cartusiana uncertain
- (tmavoretka bělavá) Monacha cartusiana (O. F. Müller, 1774) – non-indigenous Bohemia, Moravia native
- (srstnatka chlupatá) Trochulus hispidus (Linnaeus, 1758) – Bohemia, Moravia
- (srstnatka západní) Trochulus sericeus (Draparnaud, 1801) – Bohemia, Moravia
- (srstnatka huňatá) Trochulus villosulus (Rossmässler, 1838) – Moravia
- (srstnatka karpatská) Trochulus lubomirskii (Ślósarskii, 1881) – Bohemia, Moravia
- (srstnatka bezzubá) Petasina edentula (Draparnaud, 1805) – Bohemia
- (srstnatka jednozubá) Petasina unidentata (Draparnaud, 1805) – Bohemia, Moravia
- (suchomilka rýhovaná) Helicopsis striata (O. F. Müller, 1774) – Bohemia, locally extinct in Moravia
- (suchomilka pannonská) Candidula soosiana (J. Wagner, 1933) – Moravia
- (suchomilka bělavá) Candidula unifasciata (Poiret, 1801) – Bohemia, Moravia
- (suchomilka ladní) Helicella itala (Linnaeus, 1758) – Bohemia, Moravia
- (suchomilka obecná) Xerolenta obvia (Menke, 1828) – Bohemia, Moravia
- (suchomilka přehlížená) Cernuella neglecta (Draparnaud, 1805) – non-indigenous Bohemia
- (dvojzubka lužní) Perforatella bidentata (Gmelin, 1791) – Bohemia, Moravia
- (vlahovka narudlá) Monachoides incarnatus (O. F. Müller, 1774) – Bohemia, Moravia
- (vlahovka karpatská) Monachoides vicinus (Rossmässler, 1842) – Bohemia, Moravia
- (vlahovka rezavá) Pseudotrichia rubiginosa (Rossmässler, 1838) – Bohemia, Moravia
- (žihlobytka stinná) Urticicola umbrosus (C. Pfeiffer, 1828) – Bohemia, Moravia
- (tenkostěnka kýlnatá) Hygromia cinctella (Draparnaud, 1801) – non-indigenous Bohemia since 2010

Helicidae

- (plamatka lesní) Arianta arbustorum (Linnaeus, 1758) – Bohemia, Moravia
- (skalnice kýlnatá) Helicigona lapicida (Linnaeus, 1758) – Bohemia, Moravia
- (skalnice lepá) Faustina faustina (Rossmässler, 1835) – Bohemia, Moravia
- (zuboústka trojzubá) Isognomostoma isognomostomos (Schröter, 1784) – Bohemia, Moravia
- (zuboústka sametová) Causa holosericea (Studer, 1820) – Bohemia, Moravia
- (páskovka keřová) Cepaea hortensis (O. F. Müller, 1774) – Bohemia, Moravia
- (páskovka hajní) Cepaea nemoralis (Linnaeus, 1758) – Bohemia, Moravia
- (páskovka žíhaná) Cepaea vindobonensis (A. Férussac, 1821) – Bohemia, Moravia
- (hlemýždík kropenatý) Cornu aspersum = Helix aspersa (O. F. Müller, 1774) – Bohemia, non-indigenous since 2008
- (hlemýžď balkánský) Helix lucorum Linnaeus, 1758 – non-indigenous Bohemia
- (hlemýžď zahradní) Helix pomatia Linnaeus, 1758 – Bohemia, Moravia

== Freshwater bivalves ==
Freshwater bivalves in the Czech Republic include:

Unionida
Margaritiferidae

- (perlorodka říční) Margaritifera margaritifera (Linnaeus, 1758) – Bohemia, probably locally extinct in Moravia

Unionidae

- (velevrub tupý) Unio crassus Philipsson, 1788 – Bohemia, Moravia
- (velevrub malířský) Unio pictorum (Linnaeus, 1758) – Bohemia, Moravia
- (velevrub nadmutý) Unio tumidus Philipsson, 1788 – Bohemia, Moravia
- (škeble říční) Anodonta anatina (Linnaeus, 1758) – Bohemia, Moravia
- (škeble rybničná) Anodonta cygnea (Linnaeus, 1758) – Bohemia, Moravia
- (škeble plochá) Pseudanodonta complanata (Rossmässler, 1835) – Bohemia, Moravia
- (škeble asijská) Sinanodonta woodiana (Lea, 1834) – non-indigenous in Bohemia since 2001, non-indigenous in Moravia since 1996

Venerida
Corbiculidae

- (korbikula asijská) Corbicula fluminea (O. F. Müller, 1774) – non-indigenous in Bohemia since 2000

Sphaeriidae

- (okružanka rohovitá) Sphaerium corneum (Linnaeus, 1758) – Bohemia, Moravia
- (okružanka mokřadní) Sphaerium nucleus (S. Studer, 1820) – Bohemia, Moravia
- (okružanka říční) Sphaerium rivicola (Lamarck, 1818) – Bohemia, Moravia
- (okrouhlice rybničná) Musculium lacustre (O. F. Müller, 1774) – Bohemia, Moravia
- (hrachovka říční) Pisidium amnicum (O. F. Müller, 1774) – Bohemia, Moravia
- (hrachovka obecná) Pisidium casertanum (Poli, 1791) – Bohemia, Moravia
- (hrachovka kulovitá) Pisidium globulare Clessin, 1873 – Bohemia, Moravia
- (hrachovka hrbolatá) Pisidium henslowanum (Sheppard, 1823) – Bohemia, Moravia
- (hrachovka severní) Pisidium hibernicum Westerlund, 1894 – Bohemia, Moravia
- (hrachovka prosná) Pisidium milium Held, 1836 – Bohemia, Moravia
- (hrachovka nepatrná) Pisidium moitessierianum Paladilhe, 1866 – Bohemia, Moravia
- (hrachovka lesklá) Pisidium nitidum Jenyns, 1832 – Bohemia, Moravia
- (hrachovka tupá) Pisidium obtusale (Lamarck, 1818) – Bohemia, Moravia
- (hrachovka malinká) Pisidium personatum Malm, 1855 – Bohemia, Moravia
- (hrachovka okružankovitá) Pisidium pseudosphaerium Favre, 1927 – Bohemia, Moravia
- (hrachovka otupená) Pisidium subtruncatum Malm, 1855 – Bohemia, Moravia
- (hrachovka obrácená) Pisidium supinum A. Schmidt, 1851 – Bohemia, Moravia
- (hrachovka čárkovaná) Pisidium tenuilineatum Stelfox, 1918 – Bohemia, Moravia

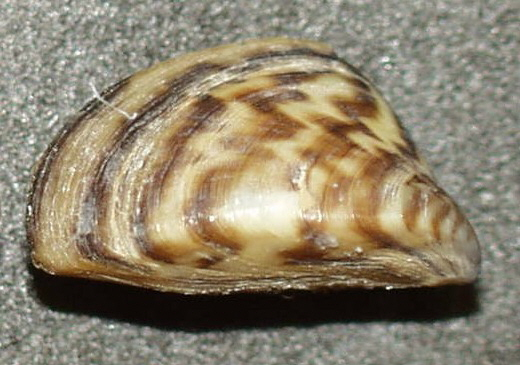
Dreissena polymorpha

Dreissenidae

- (slávička mnohotvárná) Dreissena polymorpha (Pallas, 1771) – non-indigenous in Bohemia, in southern Moravia is probably native

== Synanthropic species ==
These species do not live in the wild or are not recorded in the wild yet, but they live in greenhouses and similar biotopes, as "hothouse alien" species.

List (alphabetically according to their scientific name):

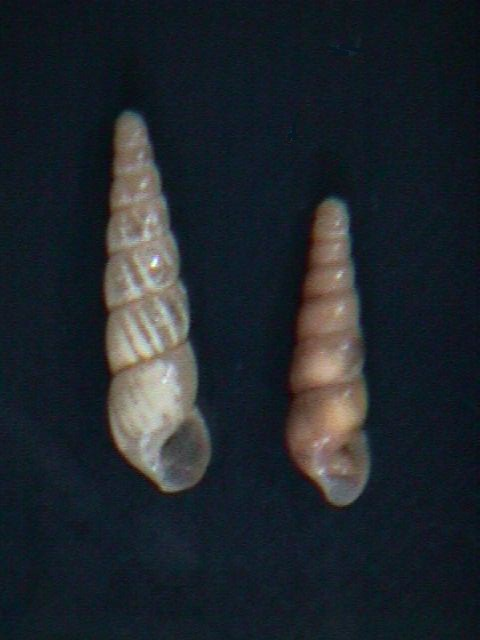
Subulina octona

- Discus rotundatus f. pyramidalis Jeffreys – form of Discus rotundatus (native species) inhabiting greenhouses
1. (křivoústka liberijská) Gulella io Verdcourt, 1974
2. (kružník čínský) Gyraulus chinensis (Dunker, 1848)
3. (skelnatěnka drobná) Hawaiia minuscula (Binney, 1840)
4. (subulína paličkovitá) Lamellaxis clavulinus (Potiez & Michaud, 1838)
5. (podkornatka iberská) Lehmannia valentiana (Férussac, 1823)
6. (piskořka hrbolkovitá) Melanoides tuberculata (O. F. Müller, 1774)
7. (subulína malá) Opeas pumilum (L. Pfeiffer, 1840)
8. one of the following two similar species:
  1. Helisoma anceps (Menke, 1830) – synonym: (okružákovec kýlnatý) Planorbella anceps (Menke, 1830)
  2. (okružákovec floridský) Planorbella duryi (Wetherby, 1879) – It was incorrectly noted as Planorbella trivolvis (Say, 1817) (mentioned under invalid name Helisoma trivolvis).
9. (ampulárka argentinská) Pomacea bridgesii (Reeve, 1856)
10. (blátivka americká) Pseudosuccinea columella (Say, 1817)
11. (subulína americká) Subulina octona (Bruguière, 1798)

== See also ==
- Fauna of the Czech Republic

Lists of non-marine molluscs of surrounding countries:

- List of non-marine molluscs of Poland
- List of non-marine molluscs of Germany
- List of non-marine molluscs of Austria
- List of non-marine molluscs of Slovakia
