= Papillifera solida deburghiae =

Scientific classification
- Domain: Eukaryota
- Kingdom: Animalia
- Phylum: Mollusca
- Class: Gastropoda
- Order: Stylommatophora
- Family: Clausiliidae
- Genus: Papillifera
- Species: P. solida
- Subspecies: P. s. deburghiae

Trinomial name
- Papillifera solida deburghiae (Paulucci, 1878)

Synonyms
- Clausilia deburghiae Paulucci, 1878 (basionym); Papillifera deburghiae (Paulucci, 1878)

Species of gastropod

Papillifera solida deburghiae is a subspecies of small, air-breathing land snail with a clausilium, a terrestrial pulmonate gastropod mollusc in the family Clausiliidae, the door snails.

== Distribution ==
This species occurs on Sicily, Italy
