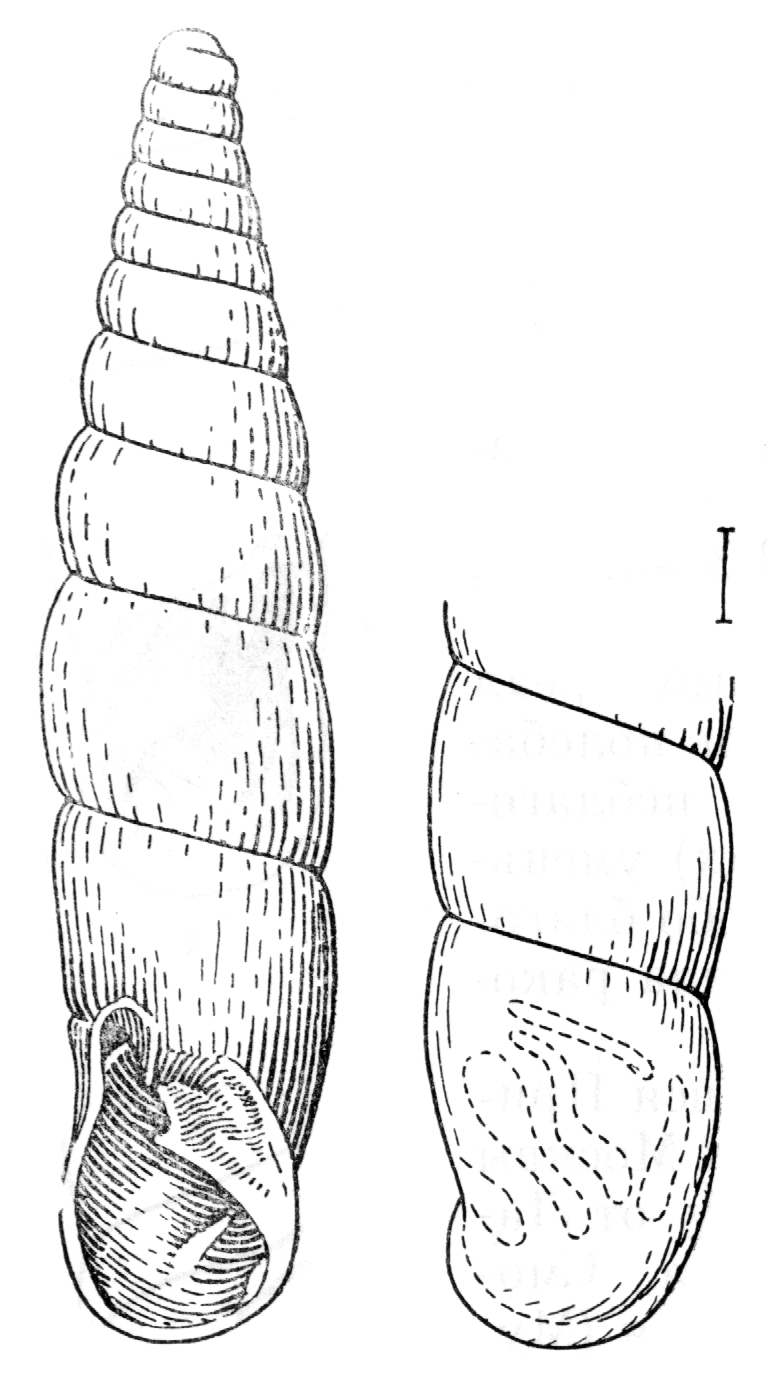

Conservation status
- Least Concern (IUCN 3.1)

Scientific classification
- Kingdom: Animalia
- Phylum: Mollusca
- Class: Gastropoda
- Order: Stylommatophora
- Family: Clausiliidae
- Genus: Cochlodina
- Species: C. costata

Binomial name
- Cochlodina costata (C. Pfeiffer, 1828)

= Cochlodina costata =

Species of gastropod

Cochlodina costata is a species of air-breathing land snail, a terrestrial pulmonate gastropod mollusk in the family Clausiliidae, the door snails, all of which have a clausilium.

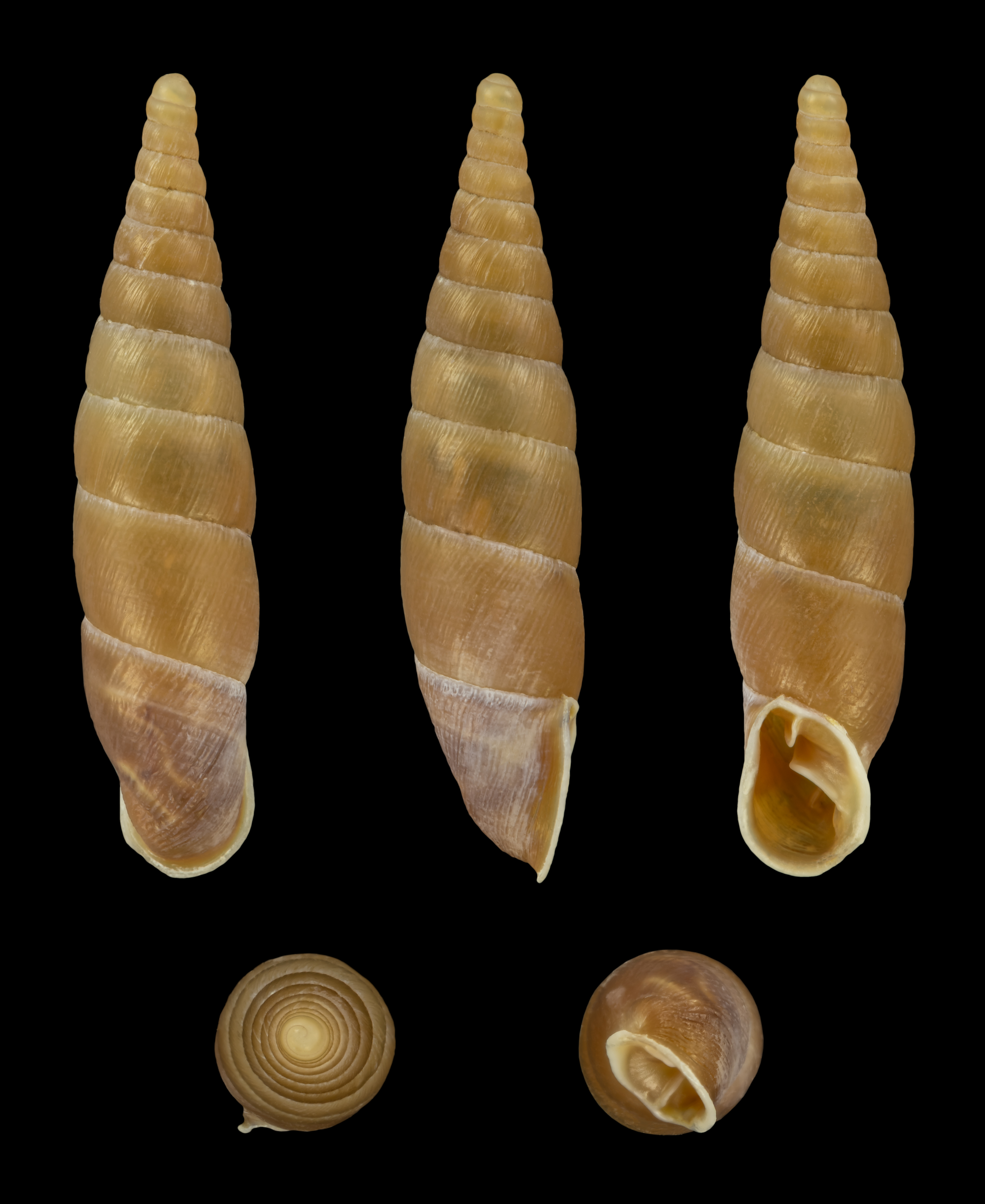
Cochlodina costata franconica

== Distribution ==
Its native distribution is the Eastern Alps and Sudetes. It occurs in:

- Czech Republic - Cochlodina costata commutata (Rossmässler, 1836) - Bohemia, Moravia
- and others
