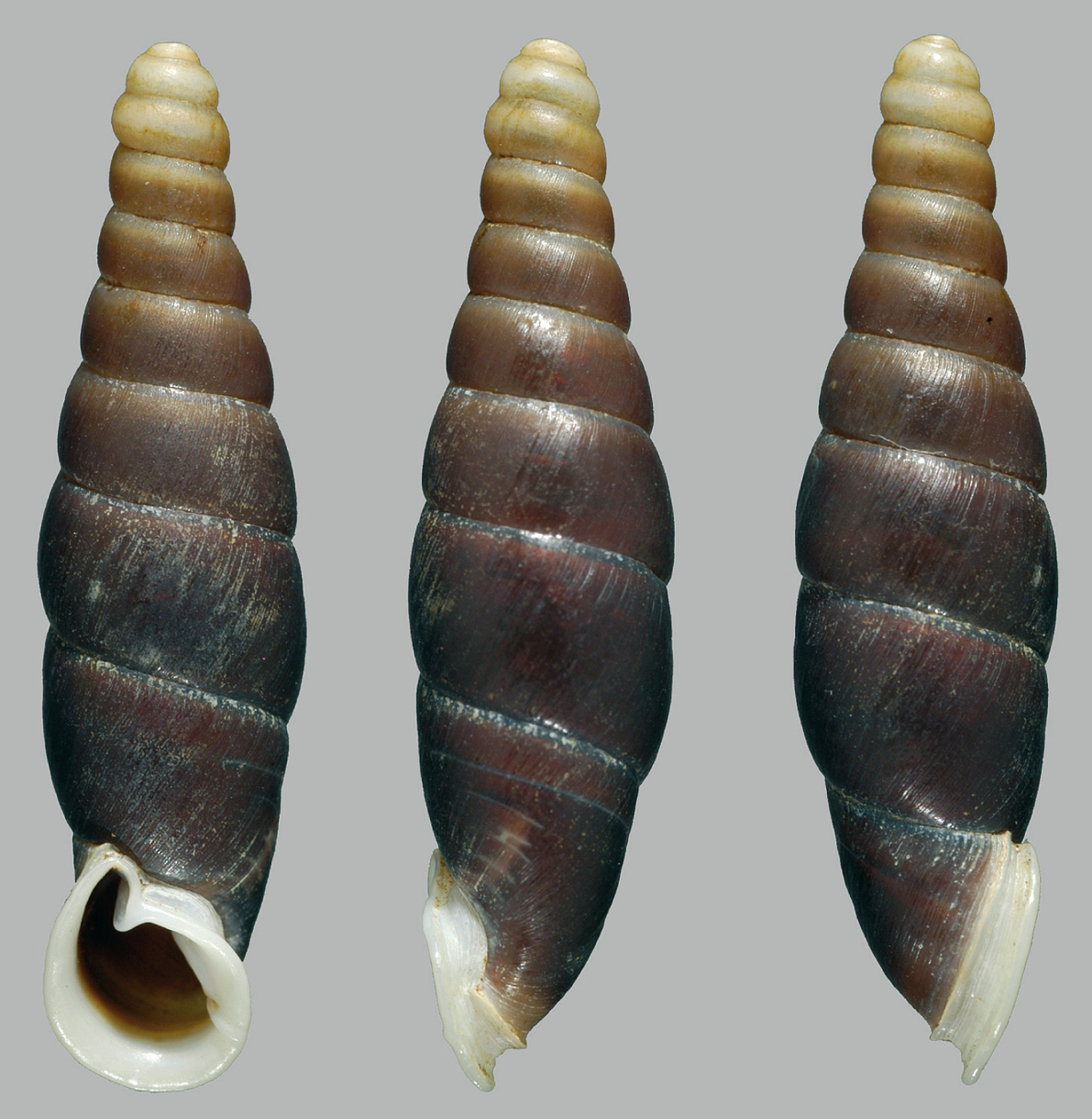

Scientific classification
- Kingdom: Animalia
- Phylum: Mollusca
- Class: Gastropoda
- Order: Stylommatophora
- Family: Clausiliidae
- Genus: Atractophaedusa
- Species: A. smithi

Binomial name
- Atractophaedusa smithi (Maassen & Gittenberger, 2007)

Synonyms
- Oospira smithi Maassen & Gittenberger, 2007

= Atractophaedusa smithi =

Species of gastropod

Atractophaedusa smithi is a species of air-breathing land snail, a terrestrial gastropod mollusk in the family Clausiliidae, the door snails.

This land snail lives in limestone areas in Vietnam. The original description was published in 2007, and included details of the reproductive system and the radula. The shell is sinistral in coiling and has 8 or 9 whorls.

The specific name smithi is in honor of Mr. Jady Smith, the project manager of the field research that resulted in the discovery of this species.

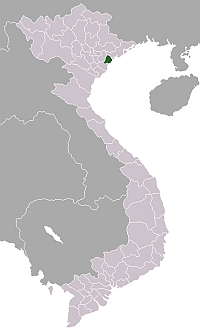
Location of Haiphong, Vietnam where Atractophaedusa smithi occurs.

== Distribution ==
This species occurs in:

- Vietnam

The type locality is Cát Bà Island, near the entrance of the Trung Trang Cave, 6.iv.2001, 20°47.38'N 106°59.87'E, Haiphong Province, Vietnam. All other known localities are also on Cát Bà Island.

== Description ==
The shell is sinistral, not decollate, rather large, fusiform, solid, dark-brown, not translucent. Apical whorls are relatively broad. With 8-9 whorls, changing from apically moderately convex to somewhat flattened. Apical whorls are very finely, spirally punctated, the remaining ones with very fine, regular striae. The striae are rather faint above the aperture and not coarser on the neck. Suture is slightly indented. Neck is without a crest. Peristome is continuous, whitish, broadly reflexed and detached; basic margin more or less semicircular.

Peristome is double; inner lip recognizable as a narrow ridge, contacting the body whorl and closing the umbilicus (visible in not fully grown specimens); outer lip is protruding, forming a small, free tube. Aperture is pear-shaped, whitish inside, with a sinulus which is not defined at the palatal side. Lamella parietalis (= superior) very prominent, reaching the margin of the peristome, which is conspicuously curved at that site; its inner end merging into the lamella spiralis. Inside the shell, the lamella columellaris reaches somewhat further than ventrally, whereas both the lamella subcolumellaris and the spiralis are slightly shorter; without a lamella inserta. In frontal view, the lamella columellaris is visible as a low, nearly straight lamella, not reaching the margin of the peristome, whereas the lamella subcolumellaris reaches the margin of the peristome in most specimens. With six plicae palatales: plica principalis, shortly visible in frontal view, ventro-laterally accompanied by five short, somewhat curved plicae, increasingly diverging from the principalis and nearly running parallel which each other, so that the lowest one runs most obliquely. Inside the body whorl, the plicae are connected by a lunella-like ridge of callus. Clausilial blade is simple, ending with a sharp angle.

The width of the shell is 5.0 (8 whorls)-5.7 mm (9 whorls), on average 5.4 mm. The height of the shell is 18.6 mm (8 whorls)-22.3 mm (9 whorls), on average 20.5 mm.

Among the species in the genus Atractophaedusa, this species is most similar to the recently described Atractophaedusa antibouddah. The other species, viz. Atractophaedusa kebavica, Atractophaedusa pyknosoma, and Atractophaedusa rhopaloides, all have decollated shells when fully grown. Atractophaedusa smithi differs from Atractophaedusa antibouddah (of which a population was discovered at Vietnam, Quang Ninh Prov., Ha Long Bay area, unnamed island in Dau Moi Temper area, 13.ix.2003, 20°55.69'N 107°09.40'E – so far this species was only known from its type locality “Vietnam, Tonkin, 4 km from Cam Pha”) by the more slender shell, with a clearly visible lamella subcolumellaris, and by the shorter plicae palatales.

Reproductive system: Vagina is short to very short. Oviduct is measuring about 2/3 of the length of the proximal part of the pedunculus, which is clearly shorter than its much narrower distal segment. Proximal part of the pedunculus about as broad as the proximal half of the oviduct, which is twice as broad as the distal half; the much narrower diverticulum reaches somewhat further than the bursa of the bursa copulatrix, which is separate from the spermoviduct. Male part of the genitalia forming a loop because the vas deferens and a short, most proximal part of the penis are united by a common sheath; with a single retractor muscle, inserting rather close to the beginning of the vas deferens, without a flagellum or caecum. The luminal structure, as far as visible in the transparent genital slides, enables the distinction of three segments: (1) a short broadest part with a relatively simple, longitudinal, luminal structure, (2) a much longer part, with a more complicated luminal surface of many protuberances that very gradually decrease in size towards segment (3), which has a wall structure with very small, irregular protuberances and changes into the epiphallus near the insertion site of the retractor muscle, without an obvious boundary.

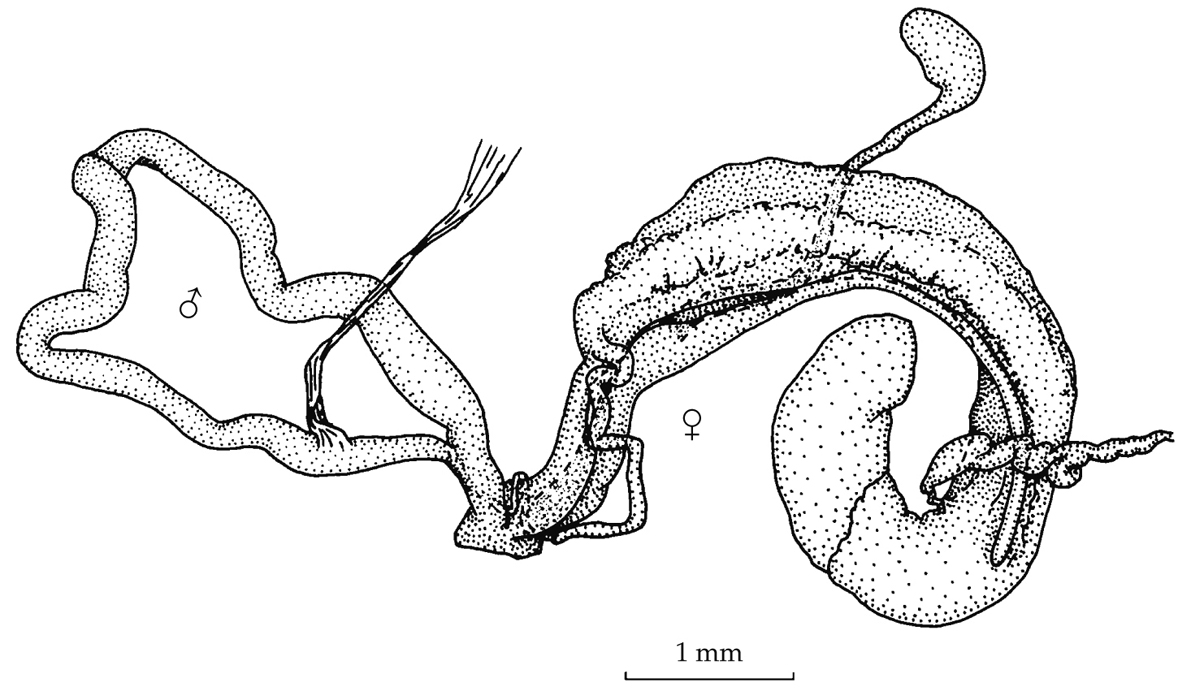
Drawing of the reproductive system of Atractophaedusa smithi.

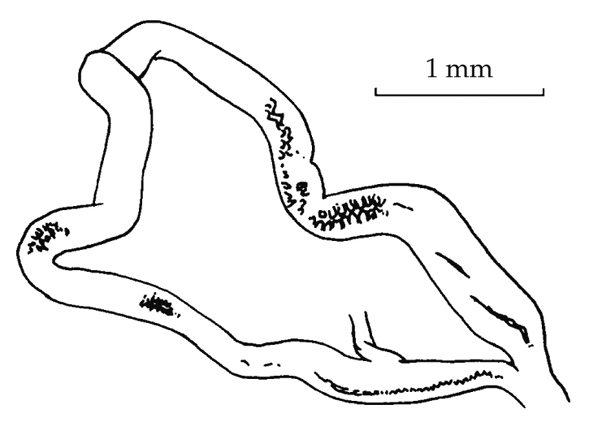
Drawing of the reproductive system: detail of the penial lumen after a transparent specimen.

Radula: The large main cusp of the central tooth is accompanied by very small ectocones. The 7-8 adjoining lateral teeth in half a row have equally small ectocones. All these teeth have prominent basal plates with interrow support ridges. In the first marginal tooth, the main cusp is less symmetrical and the basal plate is less prominently developed. The following 12 (at least) marginal teeth are increasingly more asymmetrical initially, with an endocone, which increases in prominence towards the radular margin, whereas the ectones remain unicuspid or bicuspid at most.

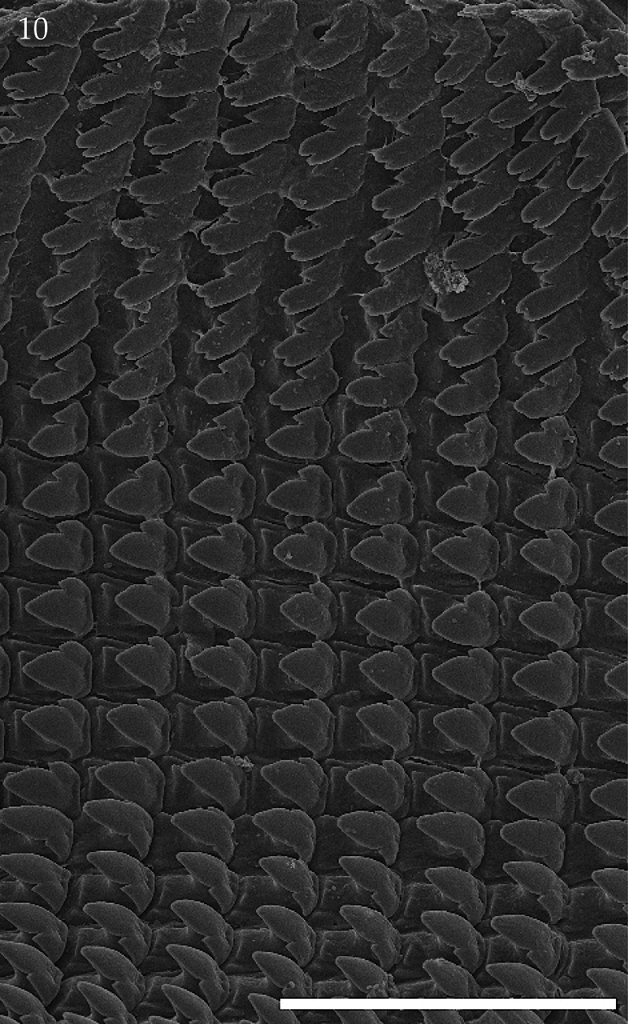
Radula: central tooth, with lateral and 8 marginal teeth.

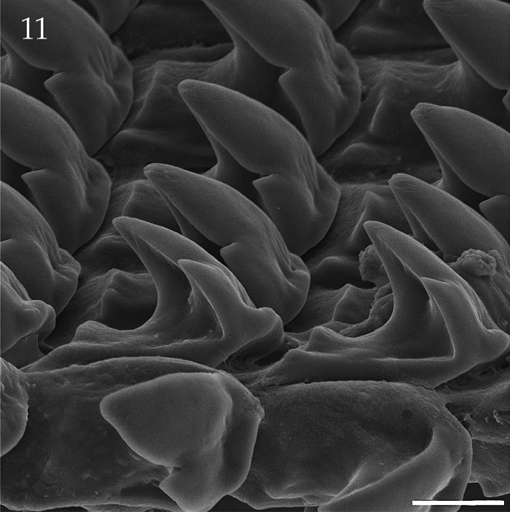
Radula: lateral teeth 3-7.

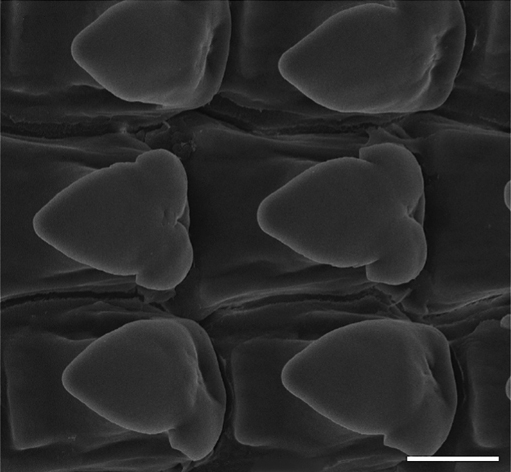
Radula: central tooth with adjoining lateral teeth 1.

== Ecology ==
Atractophaedusa smithi is known to inhabit limestone areas.
