= Cochlodina dubiosa =

Scientific classification
- Kingdom: Animalia
- Phylum: Mollusca
- Class: Gastropoda
- Order: Stylommatophora
- Family: Clausiliidae
- Genus: Cochlodina
- Species: C. dubiosa

Binomial name
- Cochlodina dubiosa (Clessin, 1882)

Species of gastropod

Cochlodina dubiosa is a species of air-breathing land snail, a terrestrial pulmonate gastropod mollusk in the family Clausiliidae the door snails, all of which have a clausilium.

== Distribution ==
This species occurs in

- The Czech Republic
