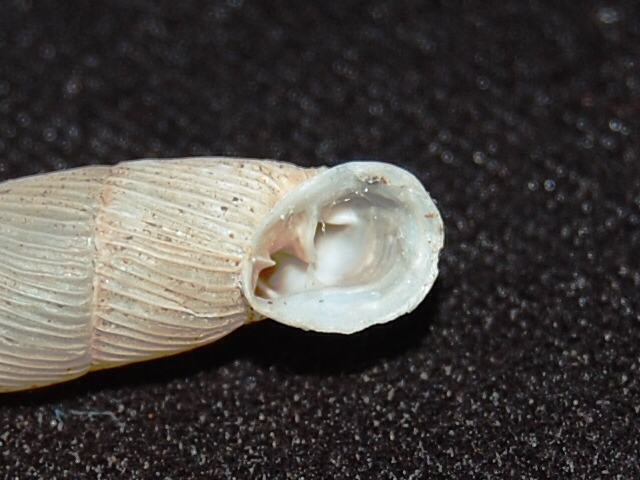
- Detail of apertural view of a shell of Siciliaria grohmanniana.

Scientific classification
- Kingdom: Animalia
- Phylum: Mollusca
- Class: Gastropoda
- Order: Stylommatophora
- Family: Clausiliidae
- Genus: Siciliaria
- Species: S. grohmanniana

Binomial name
- Siciliaria grohmanniana (Rossmässler, 1836)

= Siciliaria grohmanniana =

Species of gastropod

Siciliaria grohmanniana is a species of air-breathing land snail, a terrestrial pulmonate gastropod mollusk in the family Clausiliidae, the door snails, all of which have a clausilium.

Siciliaria grohmanniana is the type species of the genus Siciliaria.

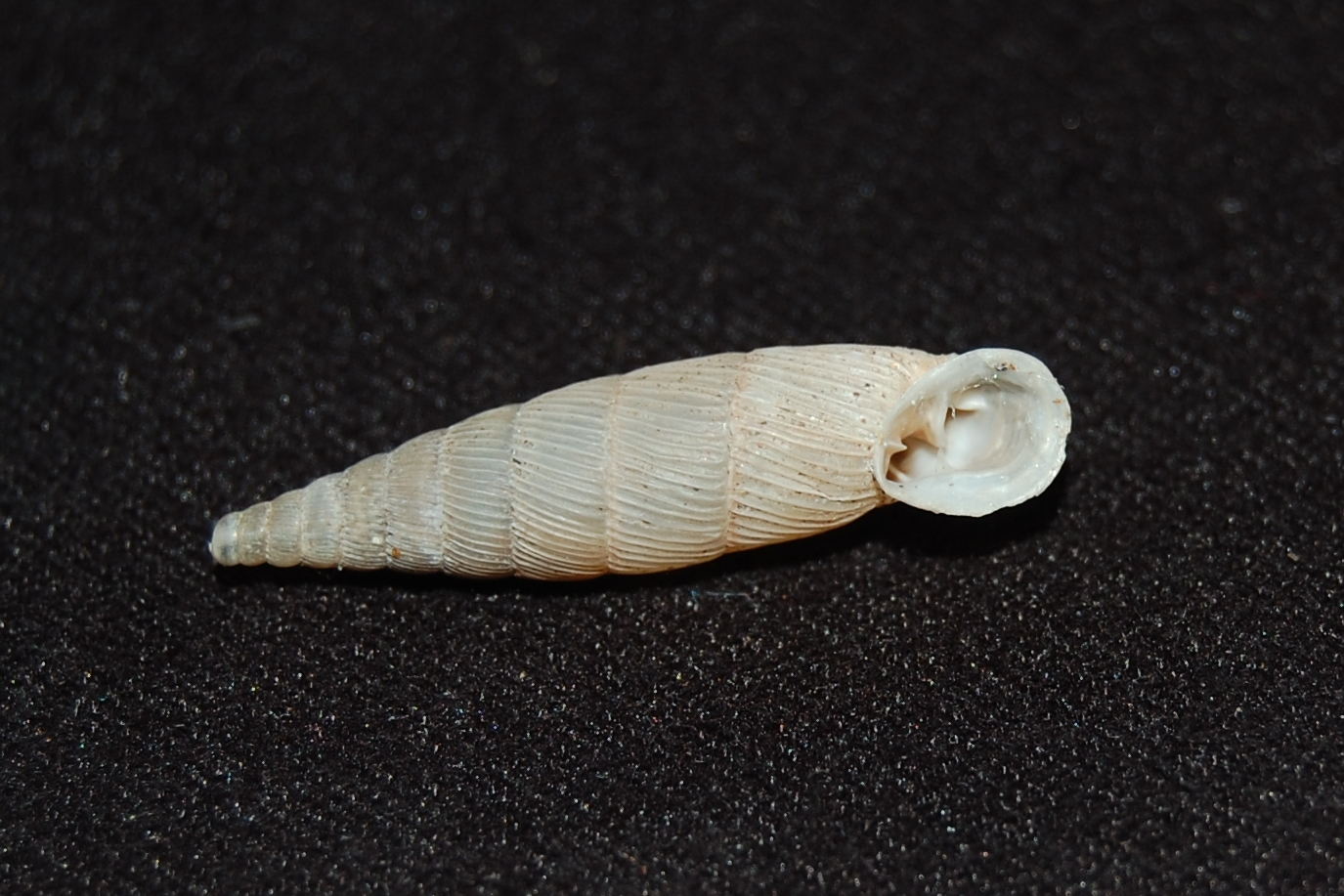
Apertural view of the shell of Siciliaria grohmanniana

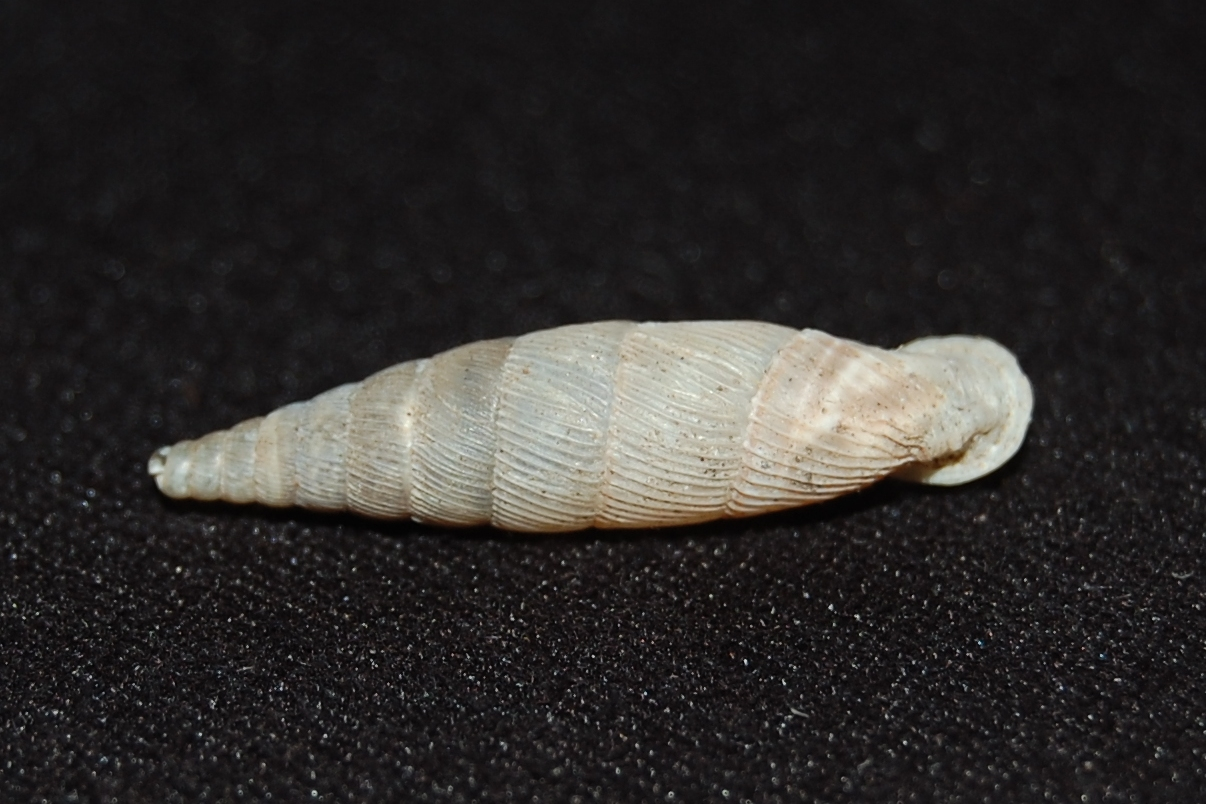
Lateral (abapartural) view of the shell of Siciliaria grohmanniana

== Distribution ==
This species occurs in Sicily.
