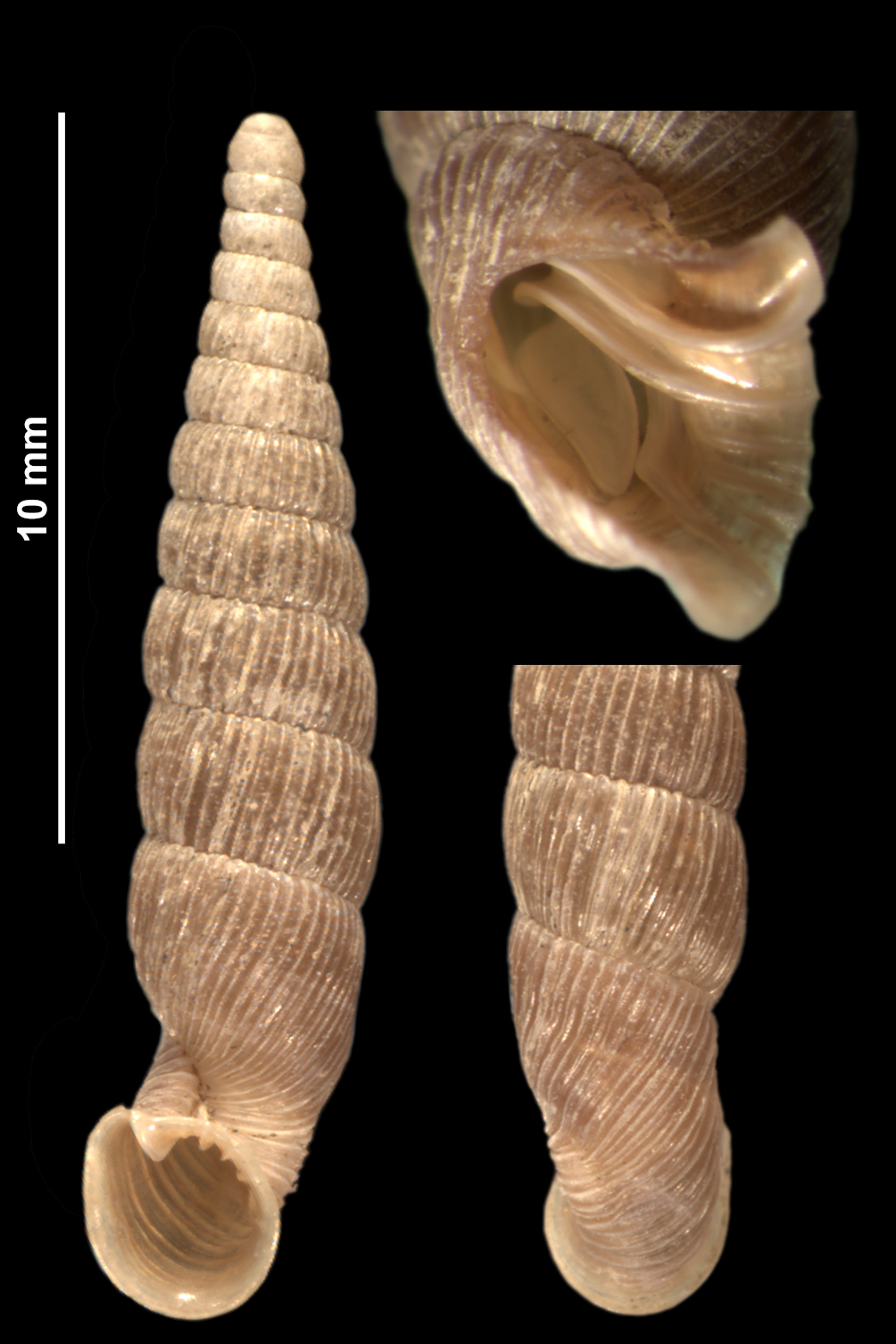
- Shell of Neniatlanta pauli (specimen at MNHN, Paris)

Scientific classification
- Kingdom: Animalia
- Phylum: Mollusca
- Class: Gastropoda
- Order: Stylommatophora
- Family: Clausiliidae
- Genus: Neniatlanta; Bourguignat, 1876

Synonyms
- Laminifera (Neniatlanta) Bourguignat, 1876; Pyrenaica O. Boettger, 1877; Tortula Westerlund, 1878

= Neniatlanta =

Genus of gastropods

Neniatlanta is a genus of small, air-breathing land snails, terrestrial pulmonate gastropod mollusks in the subfamily Laminiferinae of the family Clausiliidae, the door snails, all of which have a clausilium, a sort of sliding door.

== Species ==
Species within the genus Neniatlanta include:

- Neniatlanta pauli (Mabille, 1865)
