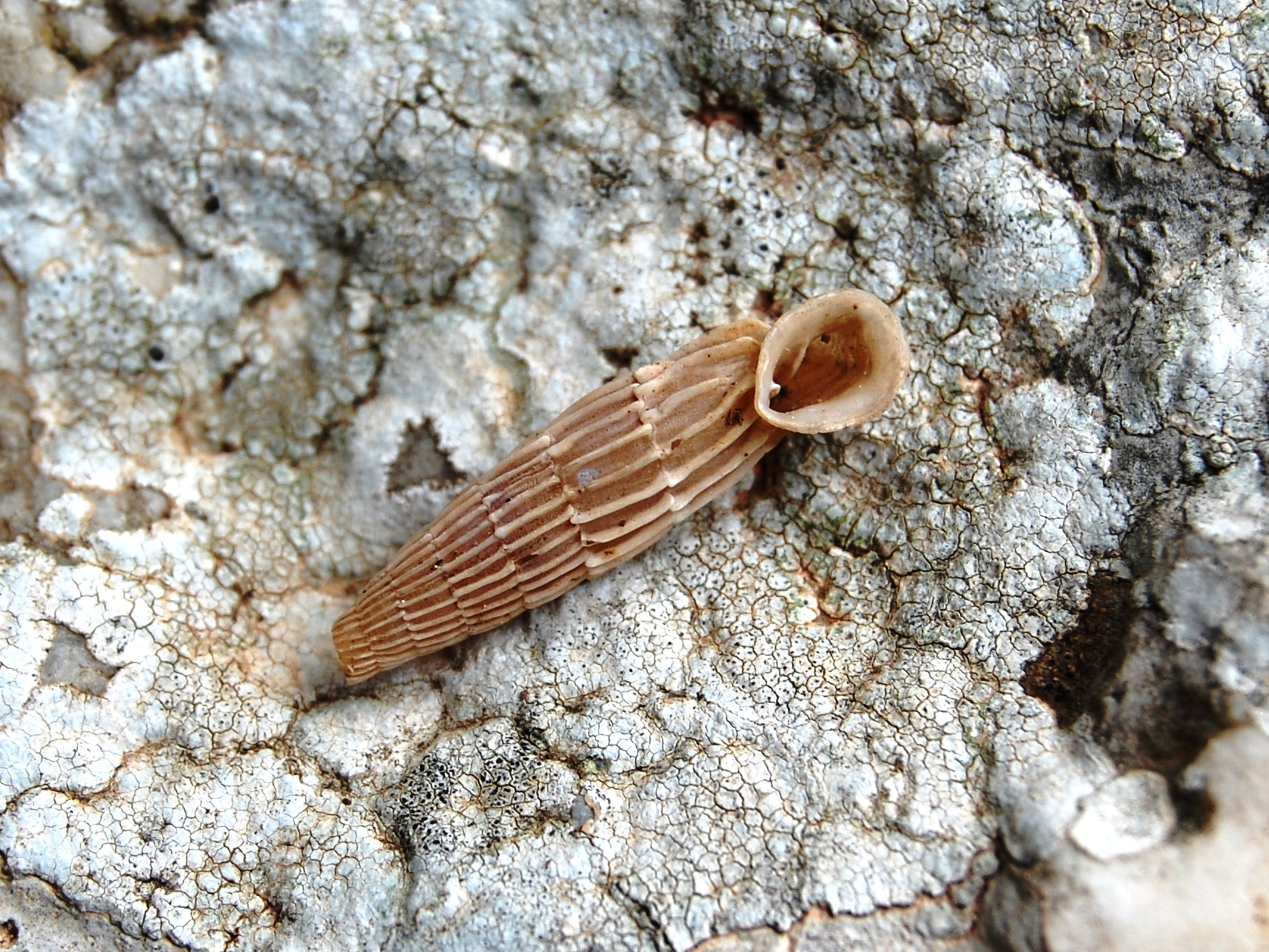

Scientific classification
- Kingdom: Animalia
- Phylum: Mollusca
- Class: Gastropoda
- Order: Stylommatophora
- Family: Clausiliidae
- Genus: Siciliaria
- Species: S. crassicostata

Binomial name
- Siciliaria crassicostata (Pfeiffer, 1856)

= Siciliaria crassicostata =

Species of gastropod

Siciliaria crassicostata is a species of small air-breathing land snail, a terrestrial pulmonate gastropod mollusk in the family Clausiliidae, the door snails, all of which have a clausilium.

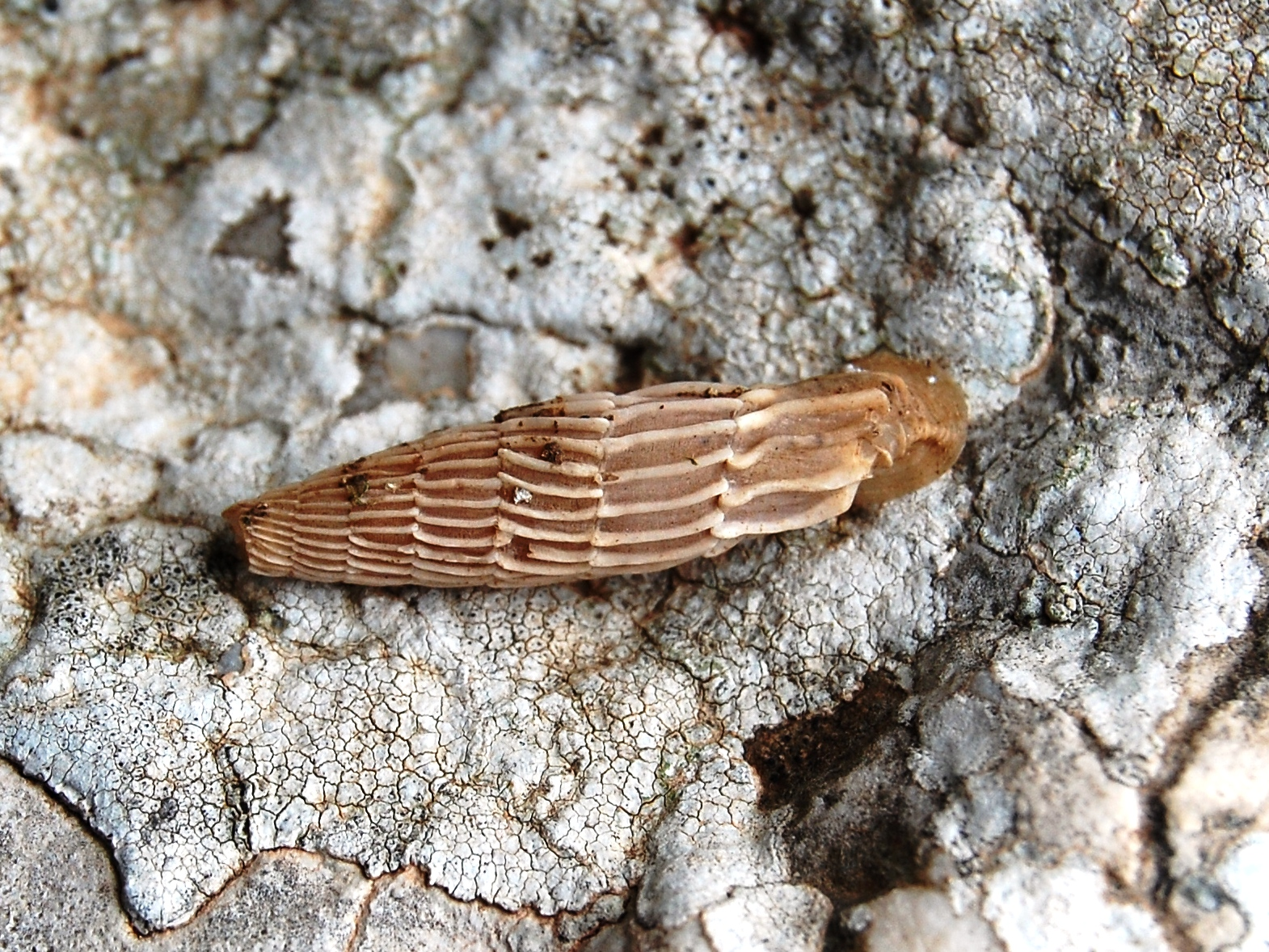
Siciliaria crassicostata

== Distribution ==
This species occurs in the Mediterranean island of Sicily.
