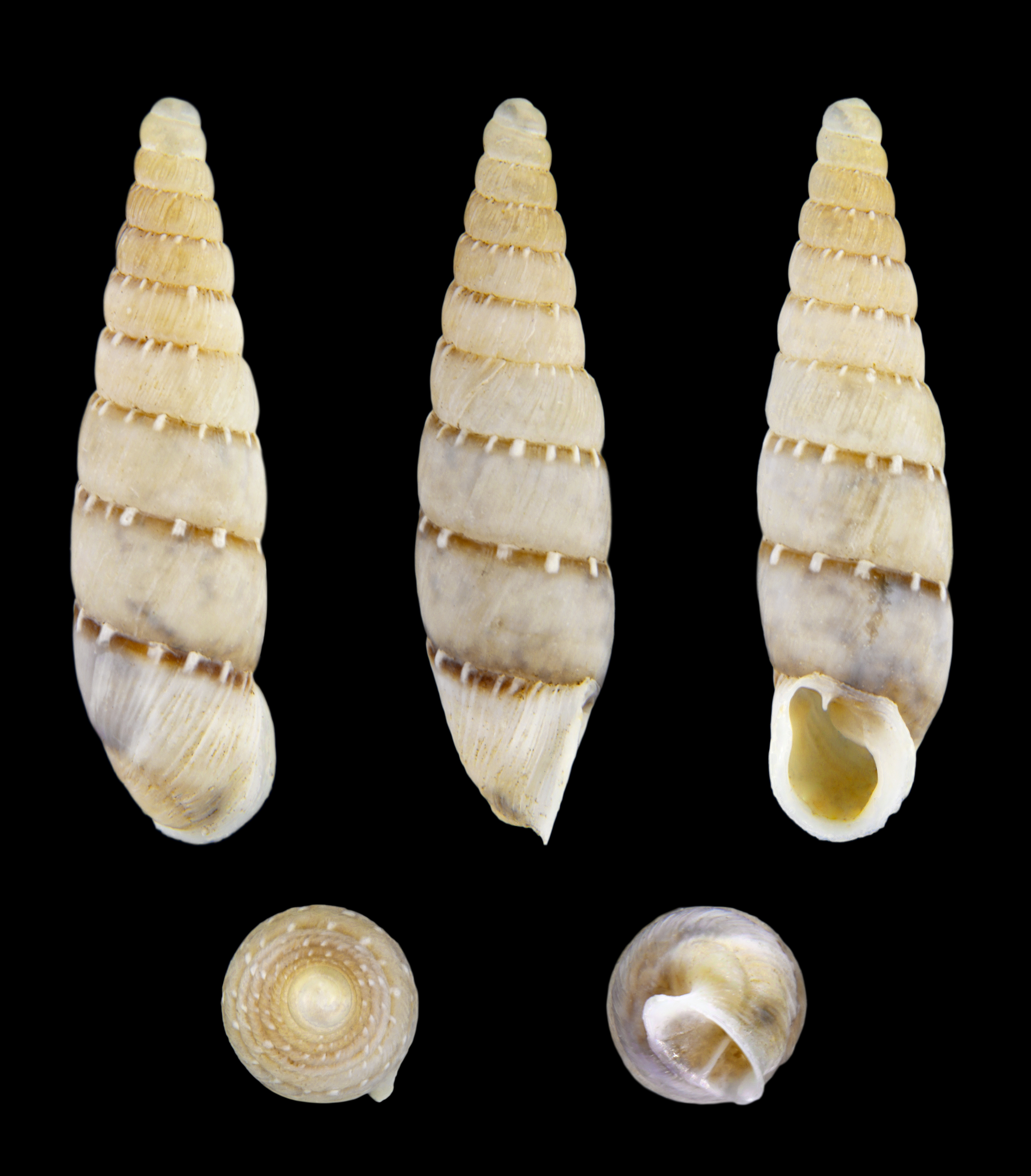

Scientific classification
- Kingdom: Animalia
- Phylum: Mollusca
- Class: Gastropoda
- Order: Stylommatophora
- Family: Clausiliidae
- Genus: Papillifera
- Species: P. papillaris

Binomial name
- Papillifera papillaris (Müller, 1774)

Synonyms
- Papillifera bidens (auct. non Linnaeus, 1758); Clausilia papillaris (O. F. Müller, 1774) (superseded generic combination); Helix papillaris O. F. Müller, 1774 (basionym)

= Papillifera papillaris =

Species of gastropod

Papillifera papillaris, formerly known as Papillifera bidens, is a species of small, air-breathing land snail with a clausilium, a terrestrial pulmonate gastropod mollusc in the family Clausiliidae, the door snails. This is a Mediterranean species, widely introduced beyond its native range with building materials.

In Britain this species is now sometimes called the "Cliveden snail", as in 2004 a very small colony was found to have been living on the estate at Cliveden House, a large stately home in Buckinghamshire, England. Individuals of the species had been living on an Italian balustrade which was imported to Britain in the late 19th century, and have survived at the estate for over a century before they were discovered there.

There is a complicated nomenclatural problem with the name of this species. Some argued that the name should be Papillifera bidens. See further discussion under "Nomenclature".

== Nomenclature ==
The ICZN opinion, number 2176, preserved the name Turbo bidens Linnaeus, 1758 and indicated implicitly that the name Helix papillaris Müller, 1774 was a junior synonym of the same species. However, at this time the meaning of the name Turbo bidens was not fixed with a valid designation of a type specimen. In 2009 Kadolsky reviewed the nomenclatural history of the name Turbo bidens and concluded that a neotype designation proposed by Falkner et al. was invalid because it was based not on an existing specimen but on a figure of Papillifera papillaris published by Gualtieri in 1742, which did not agree with Linnaeus' later description of Turbo bidens, and which Linnaeus did not quote.

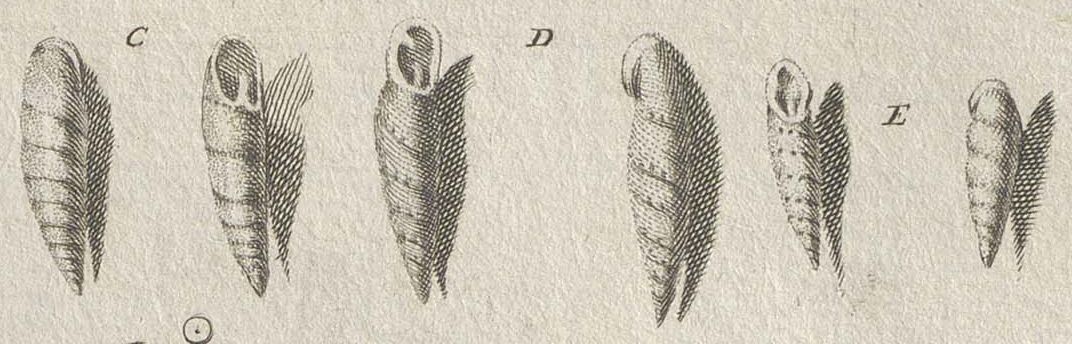
Detail of Plate 4 from Gualtieri's 1742 book. Linnaeus referred to part C when describing Turbo bidens; Schröter and others proposed that he intended to refer to parts D or E, which show P. papillaris

Kadolsky argued that Linnaeus' brief description was consistent with another figure in Gualtieri's work that Linnaeus did quote, and so Kadolsky fixed the meaning of the nominal species Turbo bidens Linnaeus, 1758 with the designation of a neotype. This neotype is a specimen from Florence (where Gualtieri lived and where he might conceivably have collected) of the clausiliid species hitherto known as Cochlodina incisa (Küster, 1876).

However, not all malacologists accepted Kadolsky's interpretation. One reason for this opinion was Linnaeus' description of the shell suture of Turbo bidens as "subcrenata". This does not apply to Cochlodina incisa, except for minute crenellations which hardly deserve the name. But Gualtieri's figure that Linnaeus referred to does actually show these crenellations. Kadolsky argued that Linnaeus accepted the figure as correct and described his species accordingly. Nordsieck and others instead argued that Linnaeus accidentally referred to the wrong figure, but that his verbal description was an accurate description of the Papillifera species.

Kadolsky's neotype designation for Turbo bidens claimed to fix the meaning of this name conclusively. In this case the valid name for the Papillifera species would be Papillifera papillaris (Müller, 1774). Others did not accept that the designation of a neotype was valid, in which case the correct name would be Papillifera bidens (Linnaeus, 1758). The issue was raised with the ICZN and their ruling (Opinion 2355) was not to set aside Kadolsky's neotype of Turbo bidens. Hence the name bidens now officially refers to a species of Cochlodina, and the correct name to use for the subject of this article is Papillifera papillaris (Müller, 1774). A neotype, from Florence, was designated in 2005.

== Subspecies ==
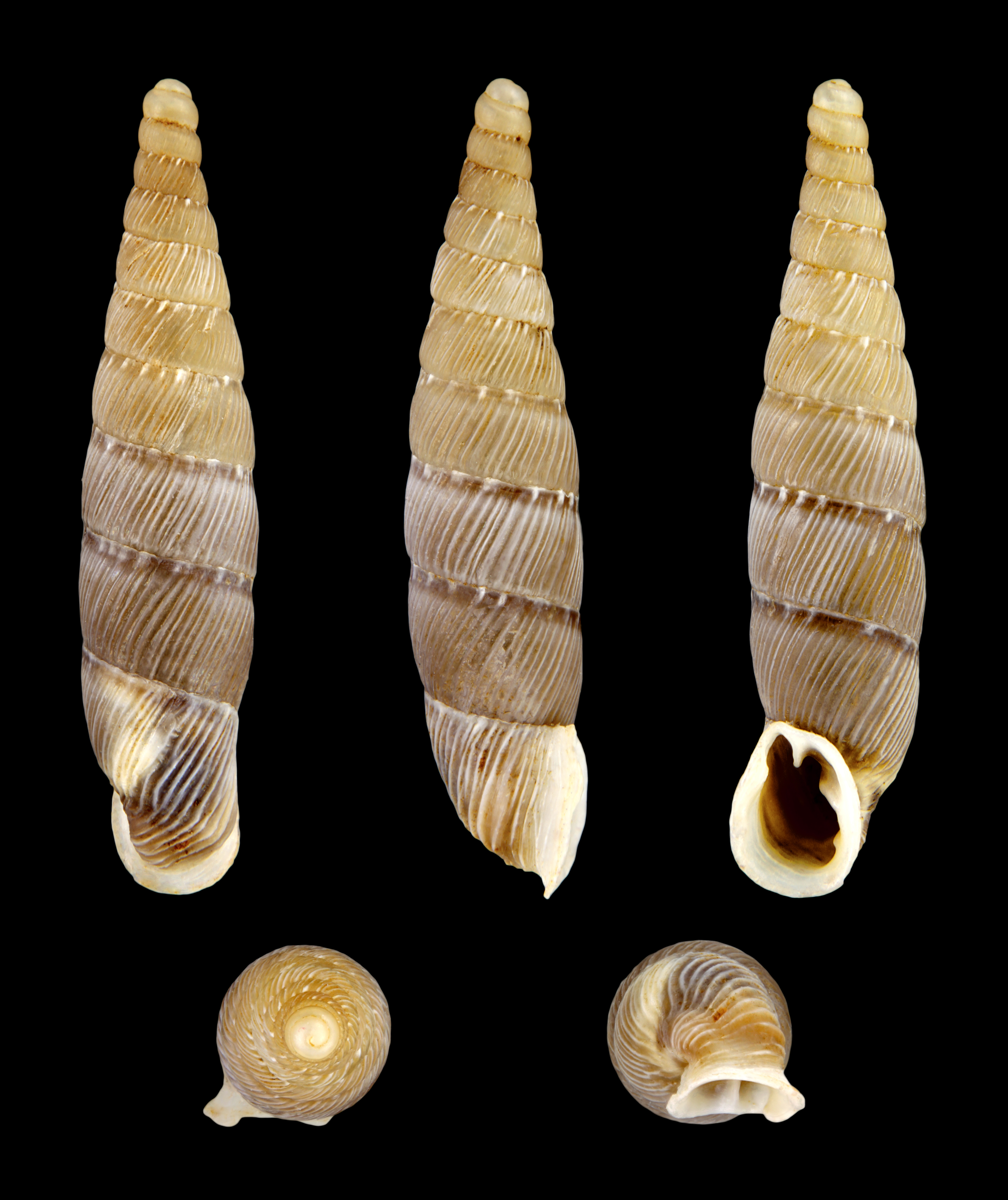
P. papillaris affinis

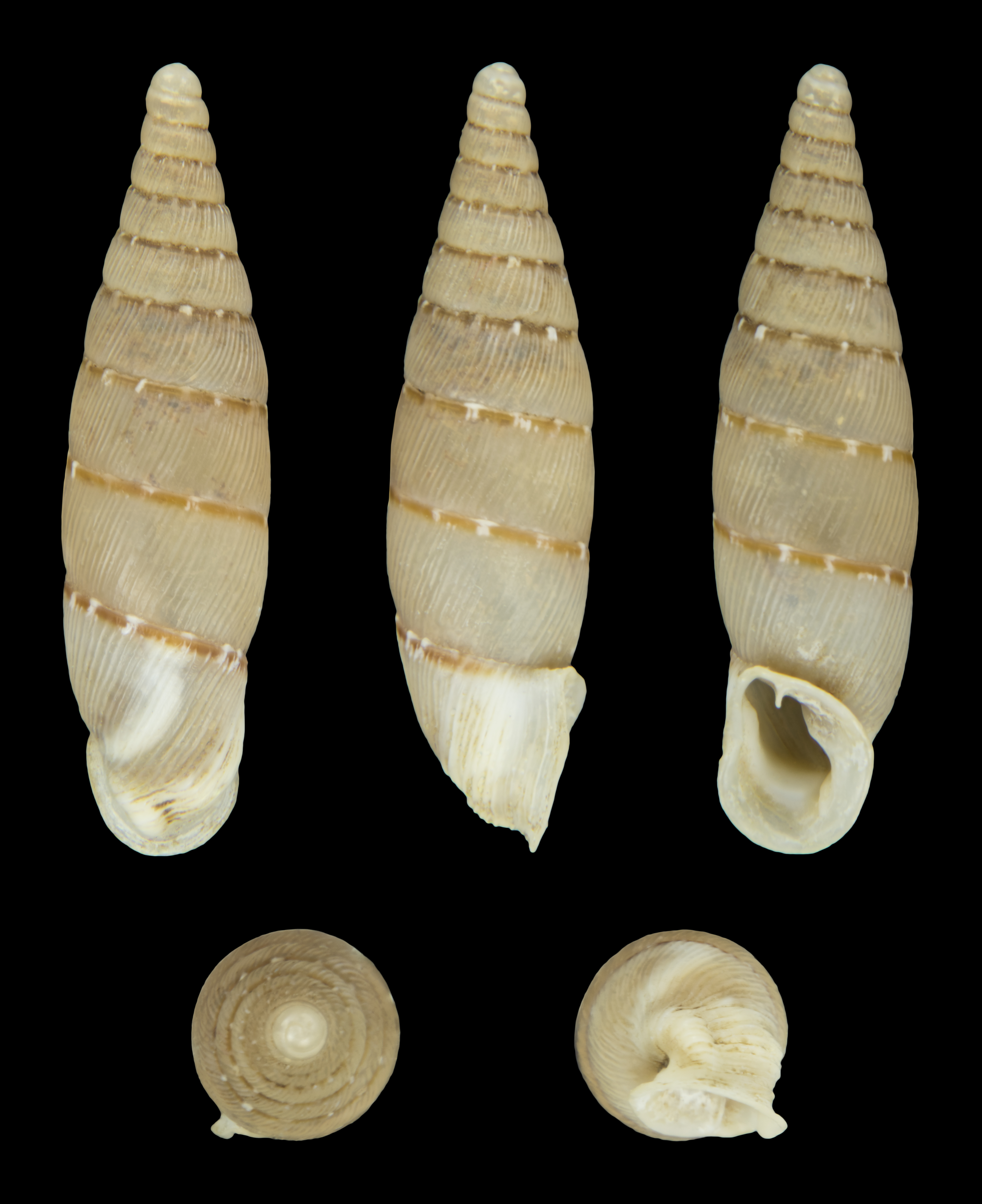
P. papillaris peculiaris

- Papillifera papillaris affinis (Philippi, 1836)
- Papillifera papillaris circinata (Paulucci, 1878)
- Papillifera papillaris papillaris (O. F. Müller, 1774)
- Papillifera papillaris peculiaris (Monterosato, 1892)
- Papillifera papillaris rudicosta (O. Boettger, 1878)
- Papillifera papillaris tinei (Westerlund, 1878)
- Papillifera papillaris transitans (Paulucci, 1878)

== Shell description ==
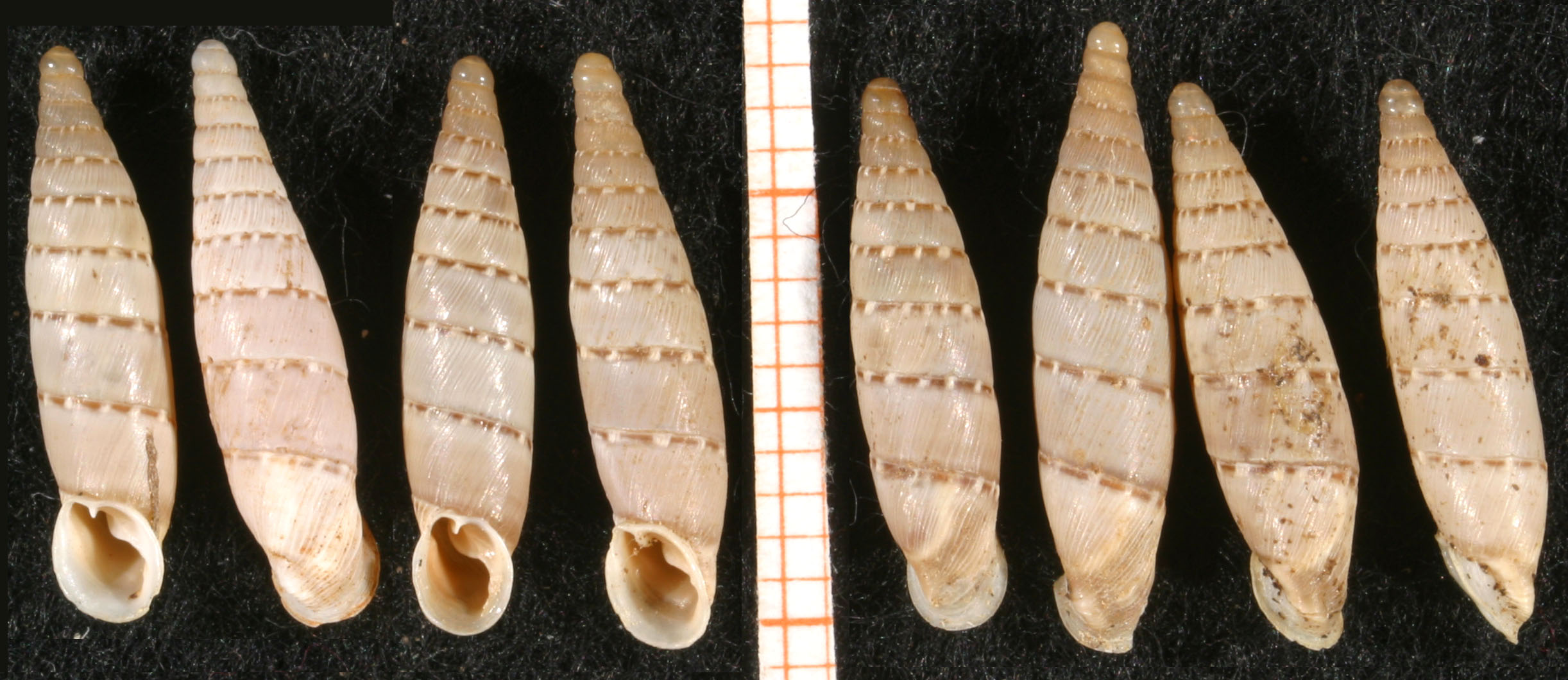
Shells of P. papillaris from Malta. Squares are 1 mm.

The shells of Papillifera papillaris are coiled sinistrally and are, like other clausilids, extremely high-spired, with 10–11 whorls.

Shell width is 3.2–3.8 mm and height 12–15 mm.

The genus name Papillifera means "bearing papules", in other words having pimples, a reference to the small white shell structures along the suture line. The papules are very noticeable.

== Habitat ==
In most of its range, this species lives in rocky limestone habitats. It can often be found near the seashore.

== Distribution ==
The native range of this species is Mediterranean; it is originally native only to Corsica and Italy (mainland, Sardinia, and Sicily).

This species has been introduced and has become established throughout the Mediterranean region, including Malta, Spain (Catalonia and the Balearic Islands), Gibraltar, the south coast of France, southern England, Croatia (Susak), Montenegro, Albania, Greece, Turkey (since 330 AD or before), Libya, Tunisia, Algeria and Morocco. At least some of these introductions appear to have been accidental, on imported stonework, and may in some cases date back to the Roman occupation of these areas. But the process is continuing: in 2009–2010, Papillifera papillaris imported on Italian limestone blocks were found to have survived overwinter in a stonemason's yard near Stuttgart, Germany.

=== In Great Britain ===
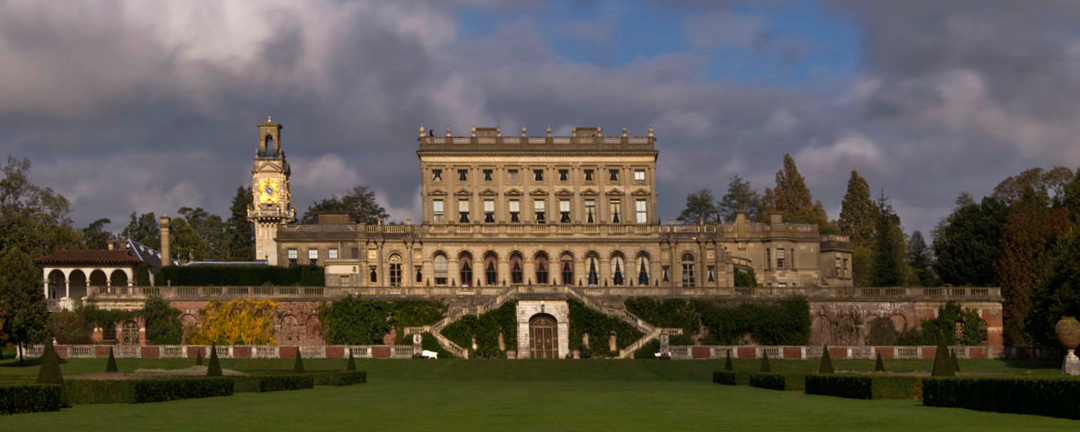
Cliveden House; the Borghese balustrade is visible on the lower level

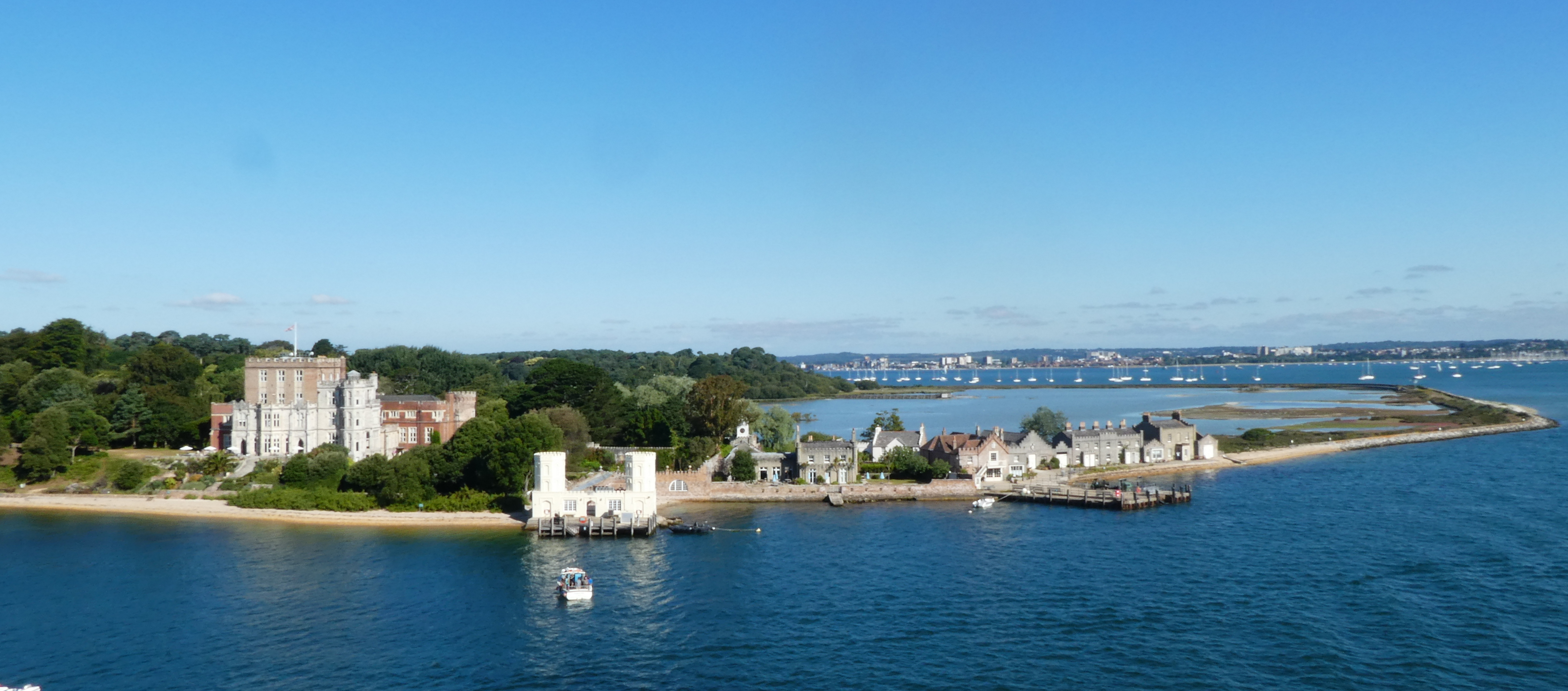
Brownsea Castle

This snail has also been accidentally introduced to southern England at least twice and has become established there.

In 2004, the species was found in Buckinghamshire, southeastern England, in the crevices of a travertine marble and brick balustrade. This balustrade was originally constructed in Italy in about 1816, and had stood in the grounds of the Villa Borghese, in Rome. The balustrade was taken from there and installed in the formal gardens of the country house Cliveden in 1896. These small snails shelter in the many nooks and crannies of the stonework; presumably they feed on lichens that grow on the surfaces of the stone.

The snails at Cliveden were noticed by a specialist volunteer who was cleaning the stonework and statuary; the identity of the snail was recognized by Janet Ridout-Sharpe. The snails have spread from the balustrade to a red-brick terrace and a stone fountain, but apparently no further than that. Although this is certainly an introduced species, it is not an invasive species.

Subsequent to the publicity surrounding this find, it was pointed out that the same species had already been recorded in 1993 from Brownsea Castle on Brownsea Island, Dorset in southwest England. Here, as at Cliveden, the snails live on stonework and statuary imported from Italy a century or more earlier. There are even indications of a Dorset occurrence of this snail, perhaps from the Brownsea locality, 250 years earlier. The snails remain confined an area of around 100 m^{2}.

A third British locality was discovered in 2024 at Burghley House in Lincolnshire. The small colony is around archways constructed in 2010 from tufa imported from Italy.
