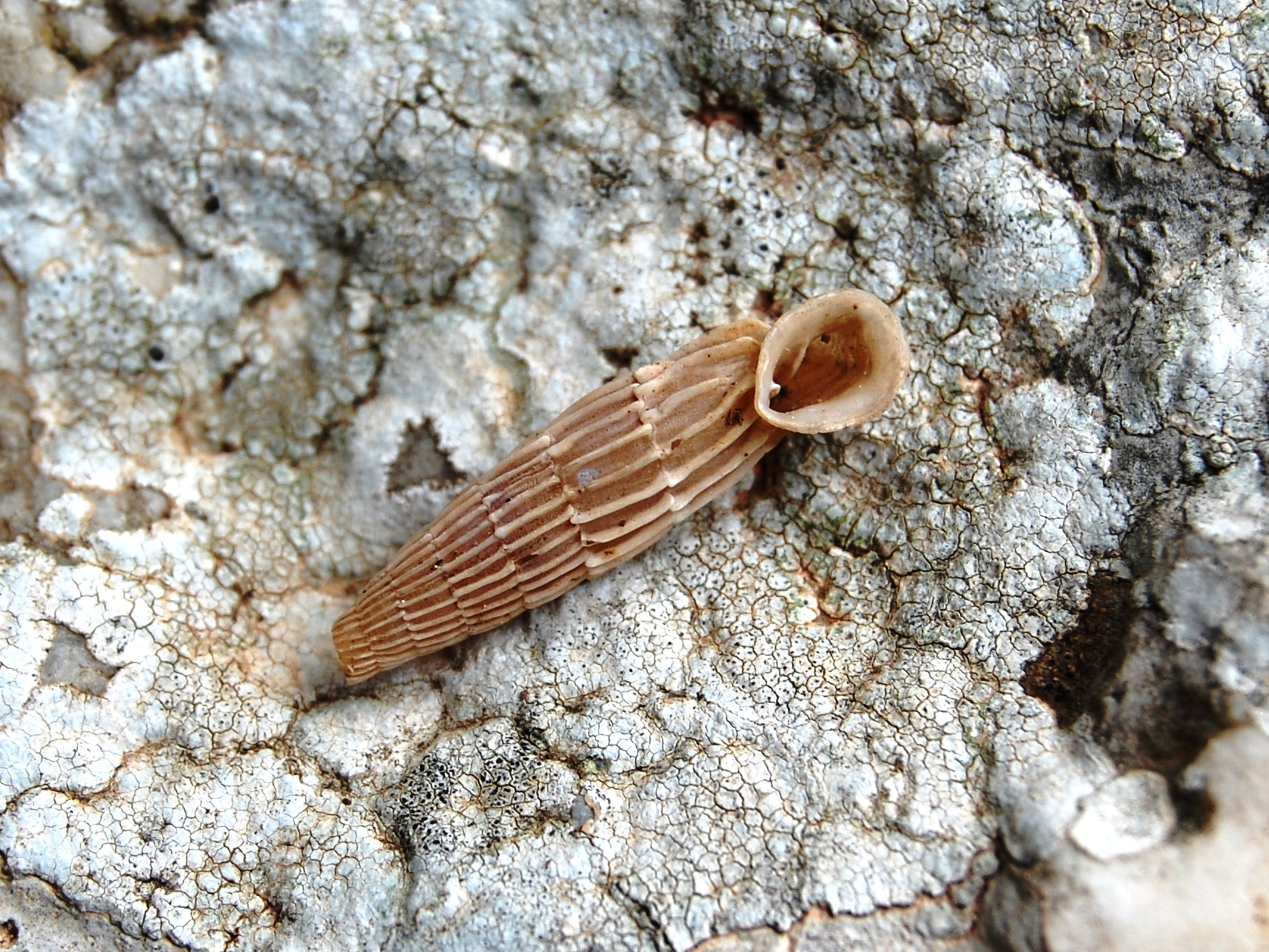
- An empty shell of Siciliaria crassicostata

Scientific classification
- Kingdom: Animalia
- Phylum: Mollusca
- Class: Gastropoda
- Order: Stylommatophora
- Family: Clausiliidae
- Genus: Siciliaria; Vest, 1867

= Siciliaria =

Genus of gastropods

Siciliaria is a genus of small, air-breathing land snails, terrestrial pulmonate gastropod molluscs in the family Clausiliidae, all of which have a clausilium.

== Species ==
Species in the genus Siciliaria include:

- Siciliaria calcarae (Philippi, 1844)
- Siciliaria crassicostata (Pfeiffer, 1856)
- Siciliaria eminens (Schmidt, 1868)
- Siciliaria ernae Fauer, 1978
- Siciliaria ferrox Brandt, 1961
- Siciliaria gibbula (Rossmässler, 1836)
- Siciliaria grohmanniana (Rossmässler, 1836)
- Siciliaria incerta (Küster, 1861)
- Siciliaria kobeltiana (Küster, 1876)
- Siciliaria lamellata (Rossmässler, 1836)
- Siciliaria leucophryna (Pfeiffer, 1862)
- Siciliaria nobilis (Pfeiffer, 1848)
- Siciliaria paestana (Philippi, 1836)
- Siciliaria pantocratoris (Boettger, 1889)
- Siciliaria riberothi Brandt, 1961
- Siciliaria scarificata (Pfeiffer, 1856)
- Siciliaria septemplicata (Philippi, 1836)
- Siciliaria spezialensis Nordsieck, 1984
- Siciliaria splendens Nordsieck, 1996
- Siciliaria stigmatica (Rossmässler, 1836)
- Siciliaria tiberii (Schmidt, 1868)
- Siciliaria vulcanica (Benoit, 1860)
