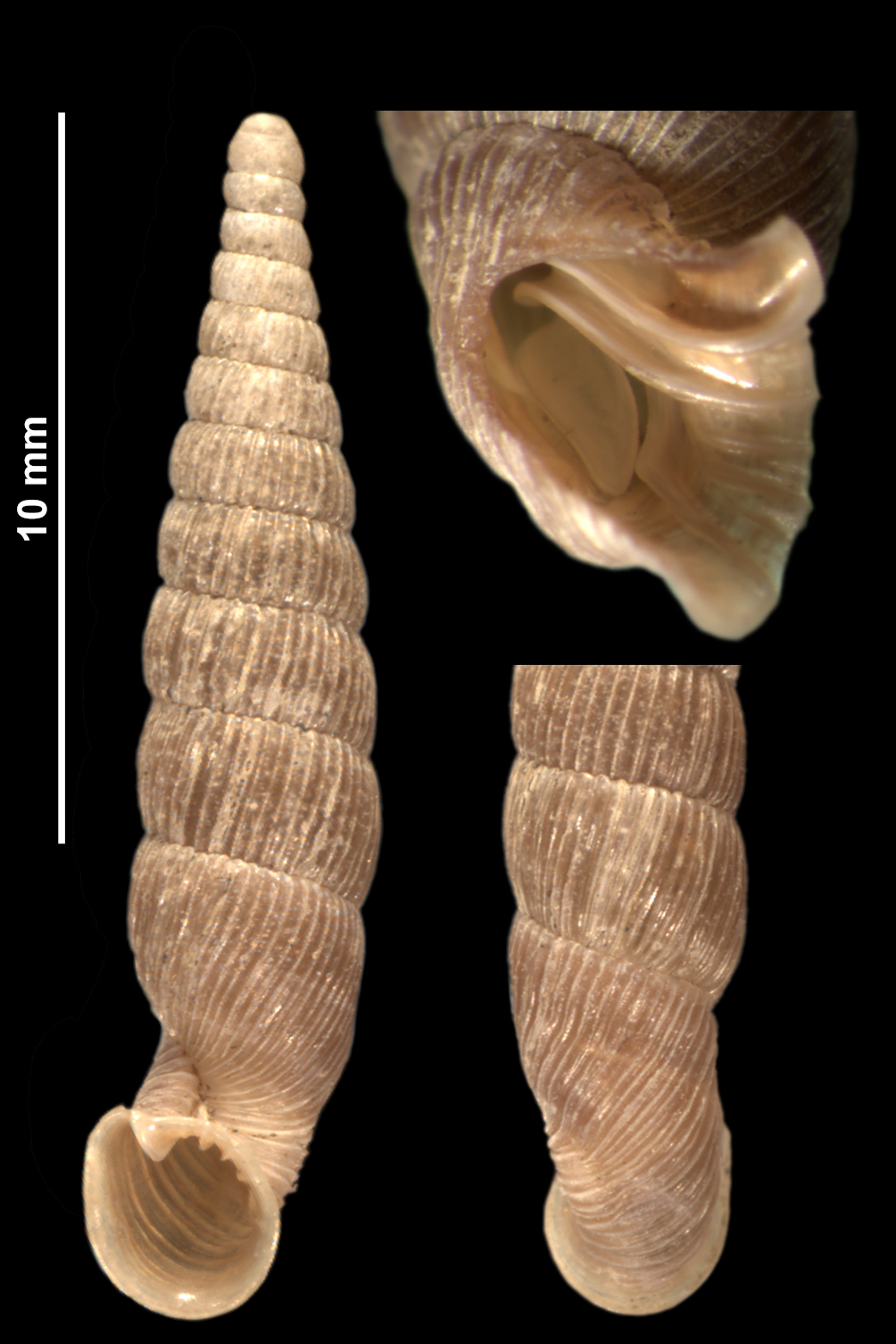

Conservation status
- Least Concern (IUCN 3.1)

Scientific classification
- Kingdom: Animalia
- Phylum: Mollusca
- Class: Gastropoda
- Order: Stylommatophora
- Family: Clausiliidae
- Genus: Neniatlanta
- Species: N. pauli

Binomial name
- Neniatlanta pauli (Mabille, 1865)

Synonyms
- Lamnifera pauli (spelling error)

= Neniatlanta pauli =

Species of gastropod

Neniatlanta pauli is a species of small, air-breathing land snail, a terrestrial pulmonate gastropod mollusk in the family Clausiliidae, the door snails, all of which have a clausilium, a sort of sliding door.

This species is found off Bayonne, France and in Spain.
