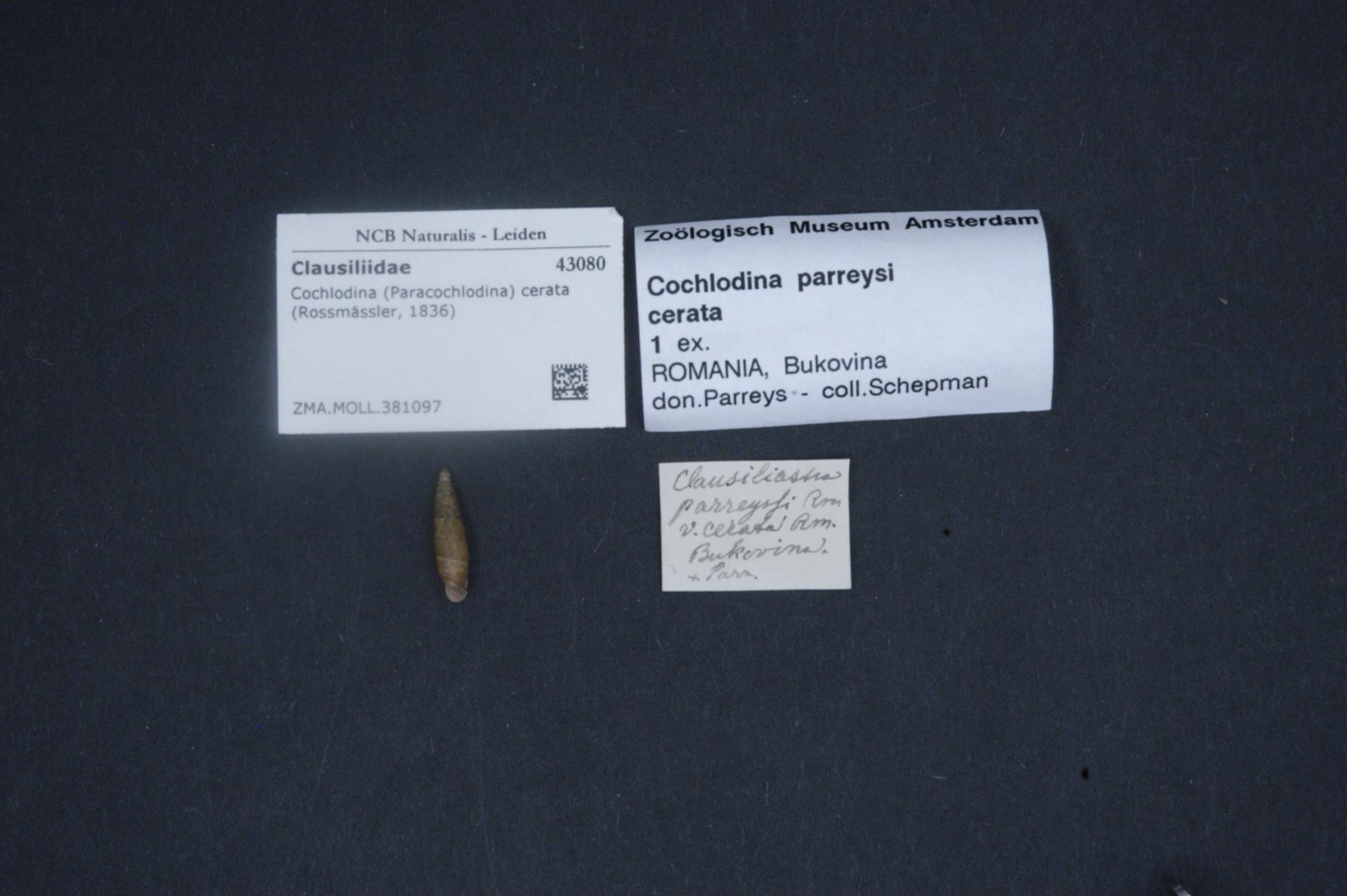

Scientific classification
- Kingdom: Animalia
- Phylum: Mollusca
- Class: Gastropoda
- Order: Stylommatophora
- Family: Clausiliidae
- Genus: Cochlodina
- Species: C. cerata

Binomial name
- Cochlodina cerata (Rossmässler, 1836)

= Cochlodina cerata =

Species of gastropod

Cochlodina cerata is a species of air-breathing land snail in the terrestrial pulmonate gastropod mollusk family Clausiliidae, the door snails, all of which have a clausilium.

== Subspecies ==
Subspecies within this species include:

- Cochlodina cerata opaviensis Brabenec & Mácha, 1960

== Distribution ==
This species occurs in the Carpathians, from Slovakia and northeastern Hungary to northern Romania.
