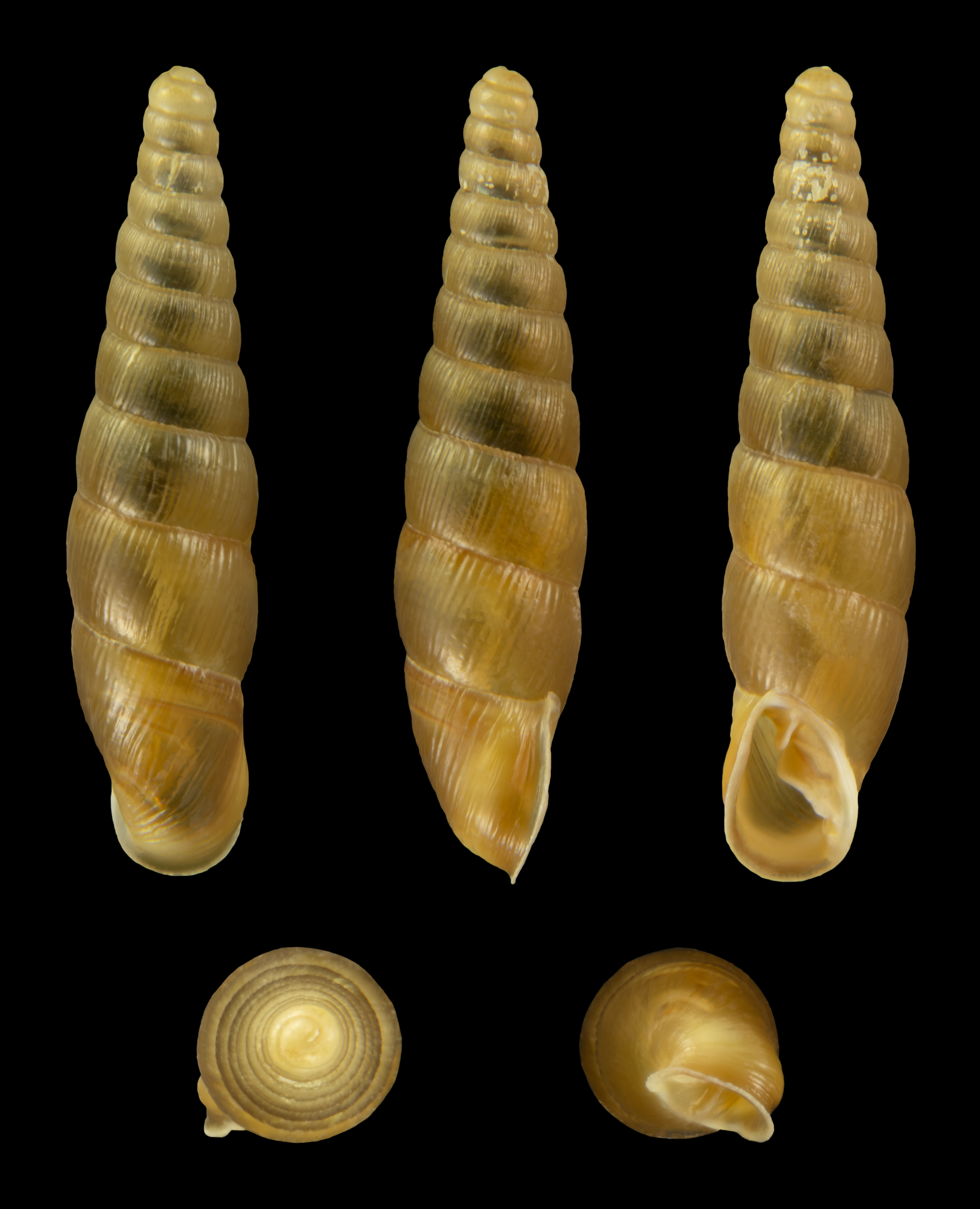
- Cochlodina orthostoma

Scientific classification
- Kingdom: Animalia
- Phylum: Mollusca
- Class: Gastropoda
- Order: Stylommatophora
- Family: Clausiliidae
- Genus: Cochlodina
- Species: C. orthostoma

Binomial name
- Cochlodina orthostoma (Menke, 1828)

= Cochlodina orthostoma =

Species of mollusc

Cochlodina orthostoma is a species of air-breathing land snail, a terrestrial pulmonate gastropod mollusk in the family Clausiliidae, the door snails, all of which have a clausilium.

== Distribution ==
Its native distribution is Central European and Eastern European. It occurs in:

- Czech Republic
- Slovakia
- Ukraine
- and others

== Description ==
The weight of the adult live snail is about 74.7±5.3 mg.

== Ecology ==
The habitat of this species is woodland.
