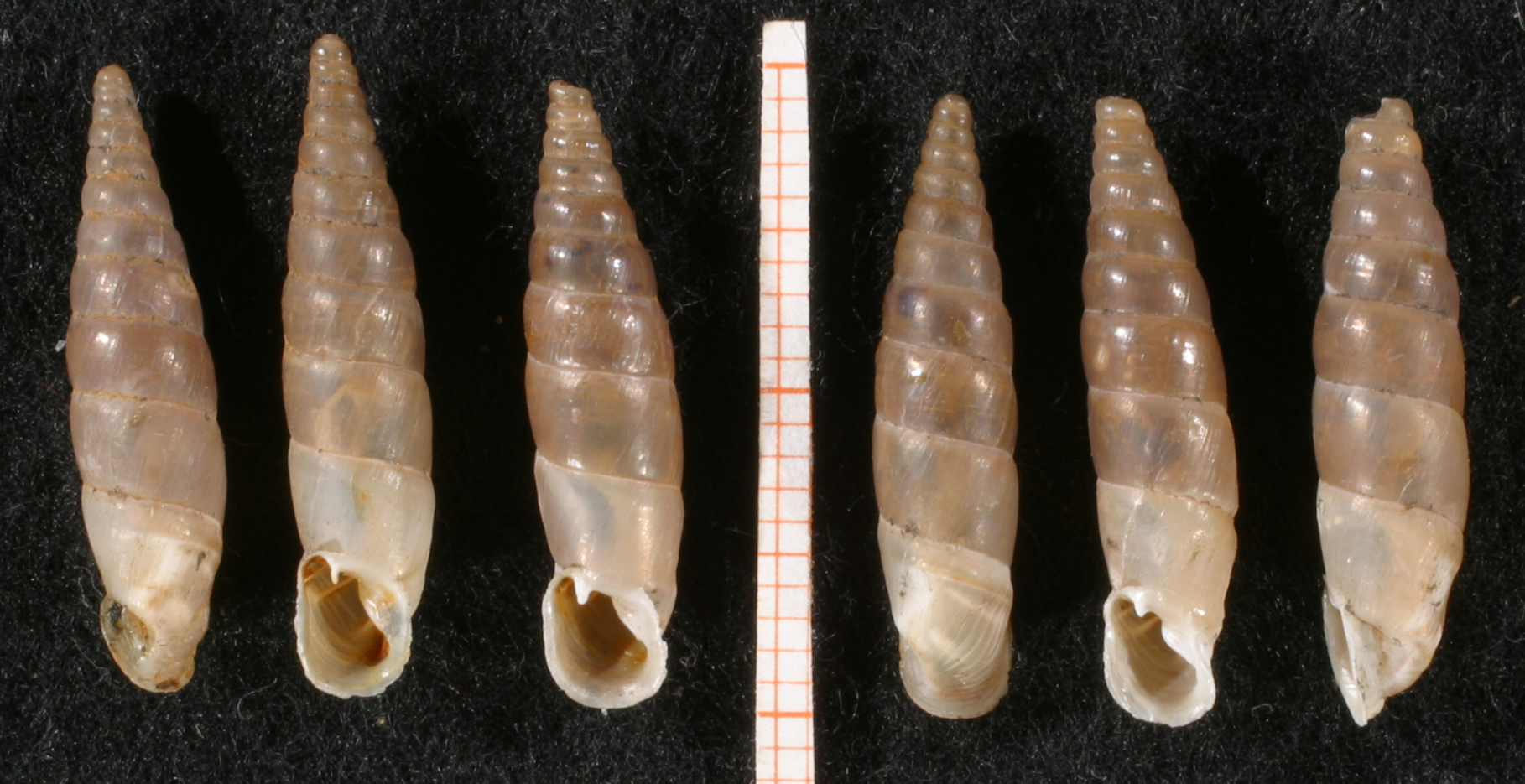
- Shells of Montenegrina cattaroensis, scale bar in mm and cm

Conservation status
- Least Concern (IUCN 3.1)

Scientific classification
- Kingdom: Animalia
- Phylum: Mollusca
- Class: Gastropoda
- Order: Stylommatophora
- Family: Clausiliidae
- Genus: Montenegrina; O. Boettger, 1877
- Species: M. cattaroensis

Binomial name
- Montenegrina cattaroensis (Rossmässler, 1835)

Synonyms
- Clausilia cattaroensis Rossmässler, 1835

= Montenegrina cattaroensis =

Species of gastropod

Montenegrina cattaroensis is a species of air-breathing land snail, a terrestrial pulmonate gastropod mollusk in the family Clausiliidae, the door snails, all of which have a clausilium.

== Distribution and conservation status ==
This species is listed in the IUCN Red List as a least concern species.

The species occurs in:

- Yugoslavia (including Serbia, Kosovo, Voivodina, Montenegro)
