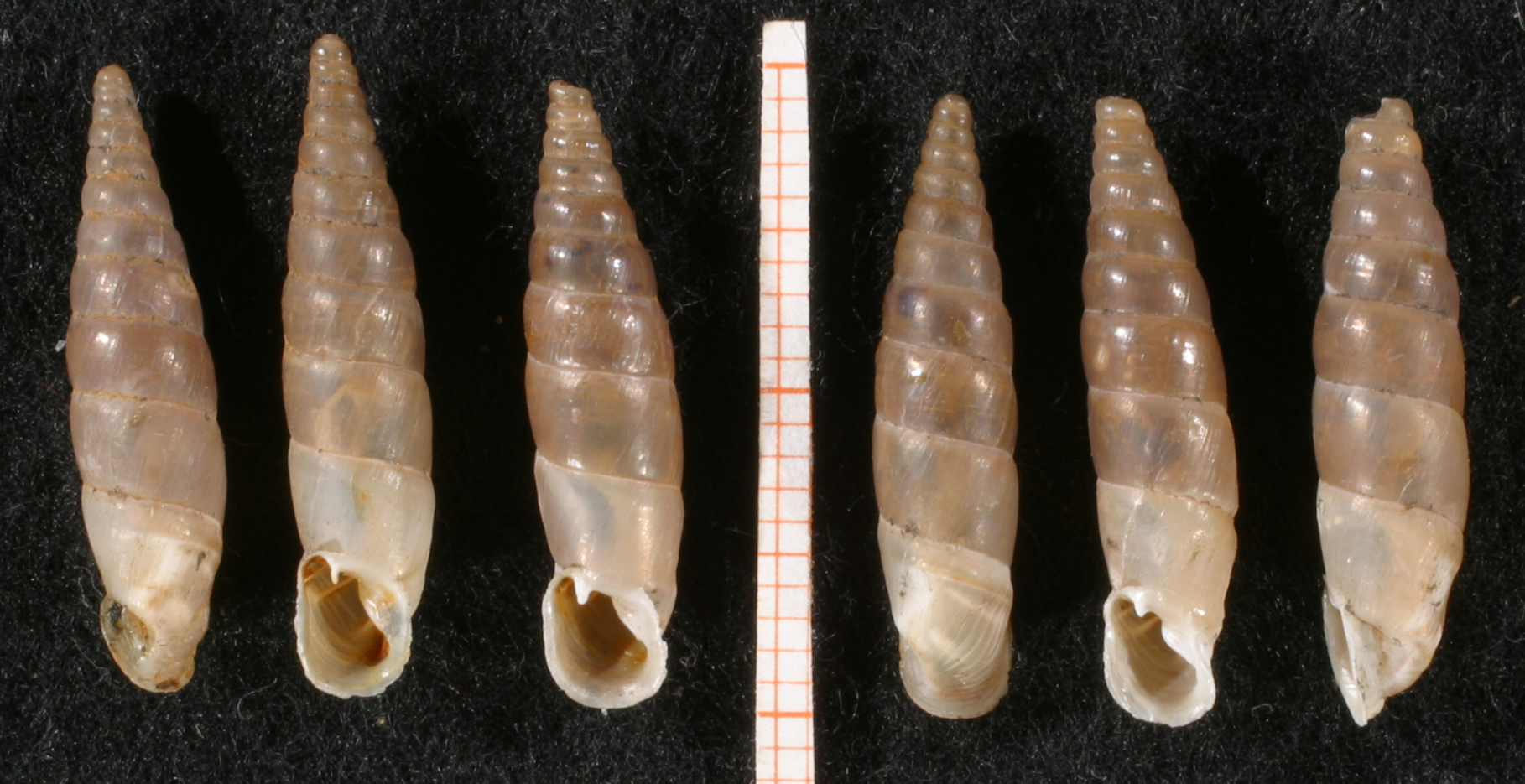
- Shells of Montenegrina cattaroensis, scale bar in mm and cm

Scientific classification
- Kingdom: Animalia
- Phylum: Mollusca
- Class: Gastropoda
- Order: Stylommatophora
- Family: Clausiliidae
- Subfamily: Alopiinae
- Tribe: Alopiini
- Genus: Montenegrina; Boettger, 1877

Type species
- Clausilia cattaroensis Rossmässler, 1835

= Montenegrina =

Genus of gastropods

Montenegrina is a genus of air-breathing land snails, terrestrial pulmonate gastropod mollusks in the family Clausiliidae, the door snails, all of which have a clausilium.

== Species ==
Species within the genus Montenegrina include:

- Montenegrina apfelbecki (Sturany, 1907)
- Montenegrina atanasiensis De Mattia, Fehér, Mason & Haring, 2020
- Montenegrina attemsi (A. J. Wagner, 1914)
- Montenegrina cattaroensis (Rossmässler, 1835)
- Montenegrina chiasma H. Nordsieck, 1972
- Montenegrina csikii Erőss & Szekeres, 2006
- Montenegrina dennisi E. Gittenberger, 2002
- Montenegrina desaretica Fehér & Szekeres, 2016
- Montenegrina dofleini (A. J. Wagner, 1928)
- Montenegrina drimica H. Nordsieck, 1972
- Montenegrina drimmeri Fehér & Szekeres, 2006
- Montenegrina edmundi Szekeres, 2006
- Montenegrina ersekensis H. Nordsieck, 1996
- Montenegrina flava Erőss & Szekeres, 2006
- Montenegrina fuchsi R. A. Brandt, 1961
- Montenegrina fusca Fehér & Szekeres, 2006
- Montenegrina globocica De Mattia, Fehér, Mason & Haring, 2020
- Montenegrina golikutensis Fehér & Szekeres, 2016
- Montenegrina gracilis Erőss & Szekeres, 2006
- Montenegrina grammica H. Nordsieck, 1988
- Montenegrina gregoi Fehér & Szekeres, 2016
- Montenegrina gropana Fehér & Szekeres, 2016
- Montenegrina haringae Fehér & Szekeres, 2016
- Montenegrina helvola (Küster, 1853)
- Montenegrina hiltrudae H. Nordsieck, 1972
- Montenegrina iba H. Nordsieck, 1972
- Montenegrina improvisa Fehér & Szekeres, 2016
- Montenegrina jakupicensis Fauer, 1993
- Montenegrina janinensis (Mousson, 1859)
- Montenegrina kastoriae H. Nordsieck, 1972
- Montenegrina klemmi R. A. Brandt, 1962
- Montenegrina lambdaformis P. L. Reischütz & Sattmann, 1990
- Montenegrina laxa (Küster, 1860)
- Montenegrina lillae Fehér & Szekeres, 2016
- Montenegrina minuscula Erőss & Szekeres, 2006
- Montenegrina miraka H. Nordsieck, 1996
- Montenegrina nana Fehér & Szekeres, 2006
- Montenegrina nobilis Erőss & Szekeres, 2006
- Montenegrina ochridensis (A. J. Wagner, 1925)
- Montenegrina okolensis Szekeres, 2006
- Montenegrina pallida Fauer, 1993
- Montenegrina perstriata (A. J. Wagner, 1919)
- Montenegrina pifkoi Fehér & Szekeres, 2016
- Montenegrina pindica H. Nordsieck, 1988
- Montenegrina pinteri H. Nordsieck, 1974
- Montenegrina prespaensis H. Nordsieck, 1988
- Montenegrina prokletiana Fehér & Szekeres, 2016
- Montenegrina protruda E. Gittenberger, 2002
- Montenegrina puskasi Fehér & Szekeres, 2016
- Montenegrina radikae H. Nordsieck, 1972
- Montenegrina remota Fehér & Szekeres, 2006
- Montenegrina rugilabris (Mousson, 1859)
- Montenegrina sattmanni H. Nordsieck, 1988
- Montenegrina selcensis Fehér & Szekeres, 2016
- Montenegrina skipetarica (Soós, 1924)
- Montenegrina soosi Erőss & Szekeres, 2006
- Montenegrina sporadica H. Nordsieck, 1974
- Montenegrina stankovici (Urbański, 1960)
- Montenegrina sturanyana Fehér & Szekeres, 2016
- Montenegrina subcristata (Küster, 1847)
- Montenegrina tenebrosa H. Nordsieck, 2009
- Montenegrina timeae Erőss & Szekeres, 2006
- Montenegrina tomorosi R. A. Brandt, 1961
- Montenegrina tropojana Fehér & Szekeres, 2016
- Montenegrina umbilicata (O. Boettger, 1879)
- Montenegrina voidomatis H. Nordsieck, 1974
- Montenegrina wagneri Szekeres, 2006
- Montenegrina zilchi H. Nordsieck, 1974
