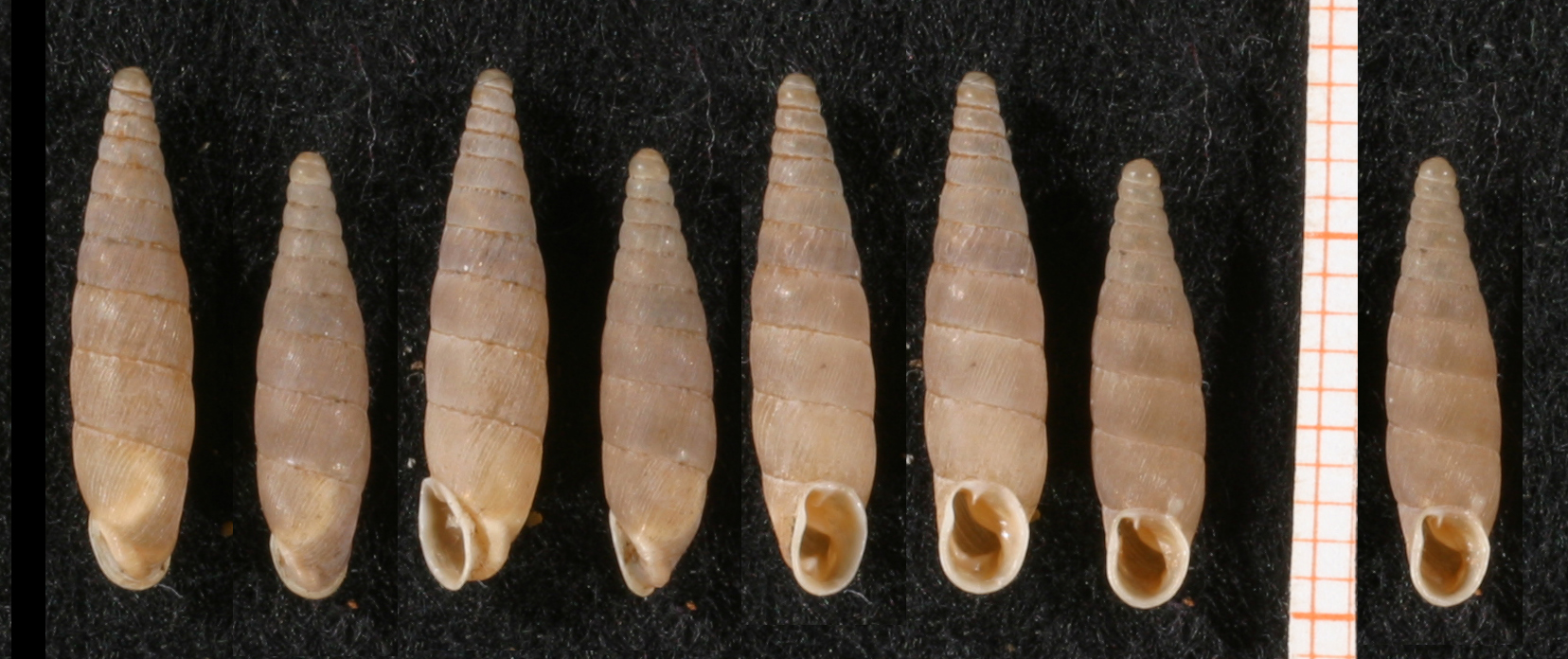
- Eight adult shells of Papillifera solida. Scale bar is in mm.

Scientific classification
- Kingdom: Animalia
- Phylum: Mollusca
- Class: Gastropoda
- Order: Stylommatophora
- Family: Clausiliidae
- Genus: Papillifera
- Species: P. solida

Binomial name
- Papillifera solida (Draparnaud, 1805)

Synonyms
- Clausilia (Papillifera) solida Draparnaud, 1805 (superseded combination); Clausilia solida Draparnaud, 1805 (original combination)

= Papillifera solida =

Species of gastropod

Papillifera solida, is a species of small, air-breathing land snail with a clausilium, a terrestrial pulmonate gastropod mollusk in the family Clausiliidae, the door snails.

Subspecies

- Papillifera solida caietana (Rossmässler, 1842)
- Papillifera solida deburghiae (Paulucci, 1878)
- Papillifera solida diabolina H. Nordsieck, 2013
- Papillifera solida pseudobidens H. Nordsieck, 2013
- Papillifera solida solida(Draparnaud, 1805)
