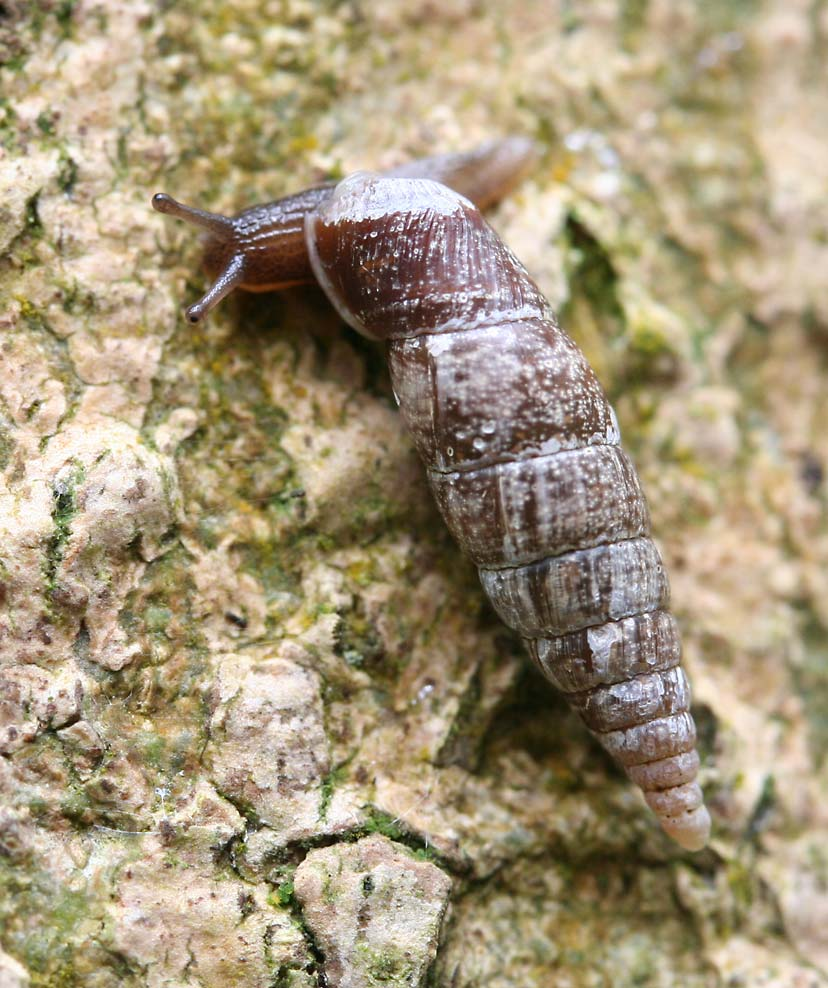
- Cochlodina laminata

Scientific classification
- Kingdom: Animalia
- Phylum: Mollusca
- Class: Gastropoda
- Order: Stylommatophora
- Family: Clausiliidae
- Subfamily: Alopiinae
- Tribe: Cochlodinini
- Genus: Cochlodina; Férussac, 1821

Type species
- Turbo laminatus Montagu, 1803

Synonyms
- Clausilia (Cochlodina) A. Férussac, 1821; Clausiliastra L. Pfeiffer, 1856; Cochlodina (Cochlodina) A. Férussac, 1821· accepted, alternate representation; Cochlodina (Cochlodinastra) H. Nordsieck, 1977· accepted, alternate representation; Cochlodina (Miophaedusa) H. Nordsieck, 1972 †· accepted, alternate representation; Cochlodina (Paracochlodina) H. Nordsieck, 1969· accepted, alternate representation; Cochlodina (Procochlodina) H. Nordsieck, 1969· accepted, alternate representation; Cochlodina (Stabilea) De Betta, 1870· accepted, alternate representation; Helix (Cochlodina) Férussac, 1821 (original rank); Marpessa Gray, 1821; Miophaedusa H. Nordsieck, 1972 †

= Cochlodina =

Genus of gastropods

Cochlodina is a genus of air-breathing land snails in the terrestrial pulmonate gastropod mollusk family Clausiliidae, the door snails.

== Distribution ==
Species within this genus occur in Europe and North Africa.

== Species ==
Species within this genus include:

- Cochlodina bidens (Linnaeus, 1758)
- Cochlodina cerata (Rossmässler, 1836)
- Cochlodina comensis (Pfeiffer, 1850)
- Cochlodina commutata (Rossmässler, 1836)
- Cochlodina costata (Pfeiffer, 1828)
- Cochlodina curta (Rossmässler, 1836)
- Cochlodina dubiosa (Clessin, 1882)
- † Cochlodina esuae H. Nordsieck, 2013
- Cochlodina fimbriata (Rossmässler, 1835)
- Cochlodina inaequalis (A. Schmidt, 1868)
- Cochlodina incisa (Küster, 1876)
- Cochlodina kuesteri (Rossmässler, 1836)
- Cochlodina laminata (Montagu, 1803)
- Cochlodina liburnica (Wagner, 1919)
- Cochlodina marisi (Pfeiffer, 1868)
- Cochlodina meisneriana (Shuttleworth, 1843)
- † Cochlodina oppoliensis H. Nordsieck, 1981
- Cochlodina orthostoma (Menke, 1828)*
- † Cochlodina perforata (O. Boettger, 1877)
- † Cochlodina prolaminata (Sacco, 1889)
- † Cochlodina reinensis Harzhauser & Neubauer in Harzhauser et al., 2014
- Cochlodina triloba (Boettger, 1878)
