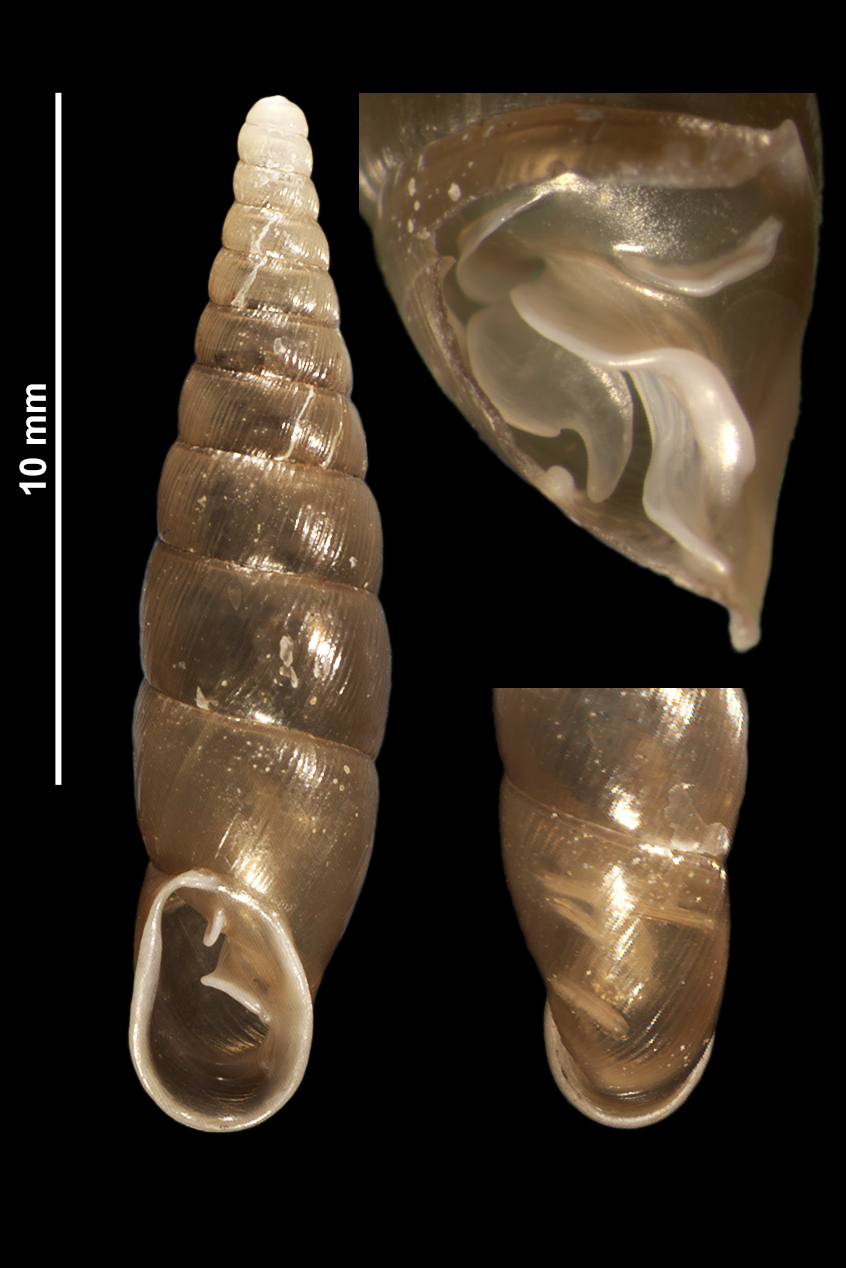

Scientific classification
- Domain: Eukaryota
- Kingdom: Animalia
- Phylum: Mollusca
- Class: Gastropoda
- Order: Stylommatophora
- Family: Clausiliidae
- Genus: Cochlodina
- Species: C. fimbriata

Binomial name
- Cochlodina fimbriata (Rossmässler, 1835)

= Cochlodina fimbriata =

Species of gastropod

Cochlodina fimbriata is a species of gastropods belonging to the family Clausiliidae.

The species is found in Europe.
