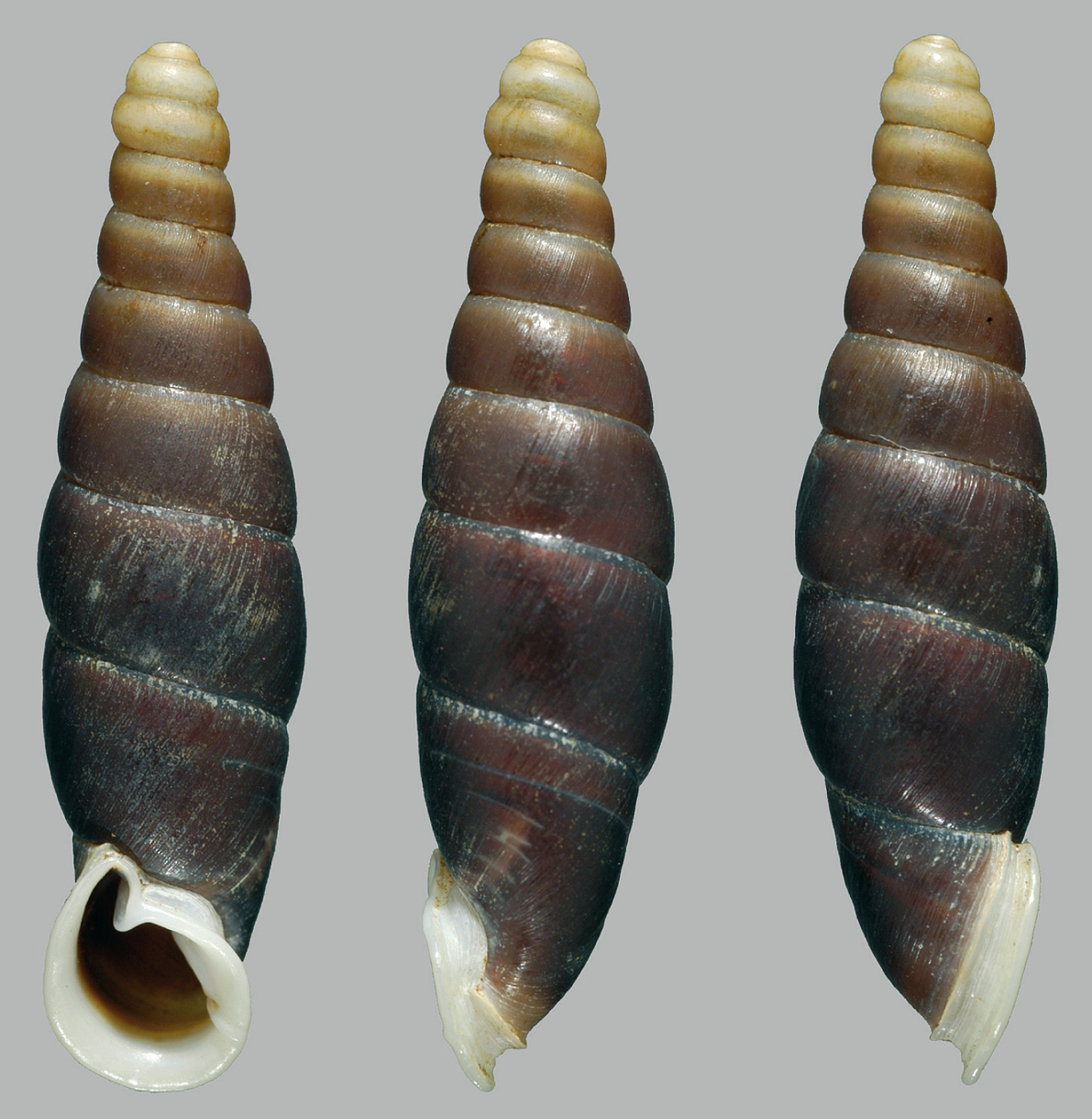
- Atractophaedusa smithi

Scientific classification
- Domain: Eukaryota
- Kingdom: Animalia
- Phylum: Mollusca
- Class: Gastropoda
- Order: Stylommatophora
- Family: Clausiliidae
- Genus: Atractophaedusa; Ehrmann, 1927

Synonyms
- Oospira (Atractophaedusa) Ehrmann, 1927

= Atractophaedusa =

Genus of land snails

Atractophaedusa is a genus of gastropods belonging to the family Clausiliidae. The species of this genus are found in South-eastern Asia.

== Species ==
The following species are recognised in the genus Atractophaedusa:

- Atractophaedusa antibouddah (H.Nordsieck, 2003)
- Atractophaedusa kebavica (Möllendorff, 1901)
- Atractophaedusa ookuboi H.Nordsieck, 2005
- Atractophaedusa pyknosoma (Gittenberger & Vermeulen, 2001)
- Atractophaedusa rhopaloides (Möllendorff, 1901)
- Atractophaedusa smithi (Maassen & Gittenberger, 2007)
- Atractophaedusa takagii (H.Nordsieck, 2005)
