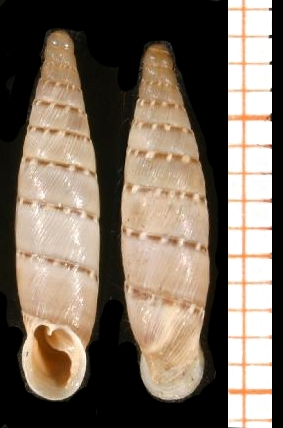
- Shells of Papillifera papillaris. Scale bar is in mm.

Scientific classification
- Kingdom: Animalia
- Phylum: Mollusca
- Class: Gastropoda
- Order: Stylommatophora
- Infraorder: Clausilioidei
- Superfamily: Clausilioidea
- Family: Clausiliidae
- Genus: Papillifera; Hartmann, 1842

Synonyms
- Clausilia (Papillifera) W. Hartmann, 1842 (superseded combination); Papillina Moquin-Tandon, 1856

= Papillifera =

Genus of gastropods

Papillifera is a genus of air-breathing land snails with a clausilium, a terrestrial pulmonate gastropod mollusc in the subfamily Alopiinae of the family Clausiliidae, the door snails.

== Species ==
- Papillifera papillaris (O. F. Müller, 1774)
- Papillifera solida (Draparnaud, 1805) – type species

Species brought into synonymy

- Papillifera bidens (Linnaeus, 1758): synonym of Papillifera papillaris (O. F. Müller, 1774)
- Papillifera deburghiae (Paulucci, 1878): synonym of Papillifera solida deburghiae (Paulucci, 1878)
