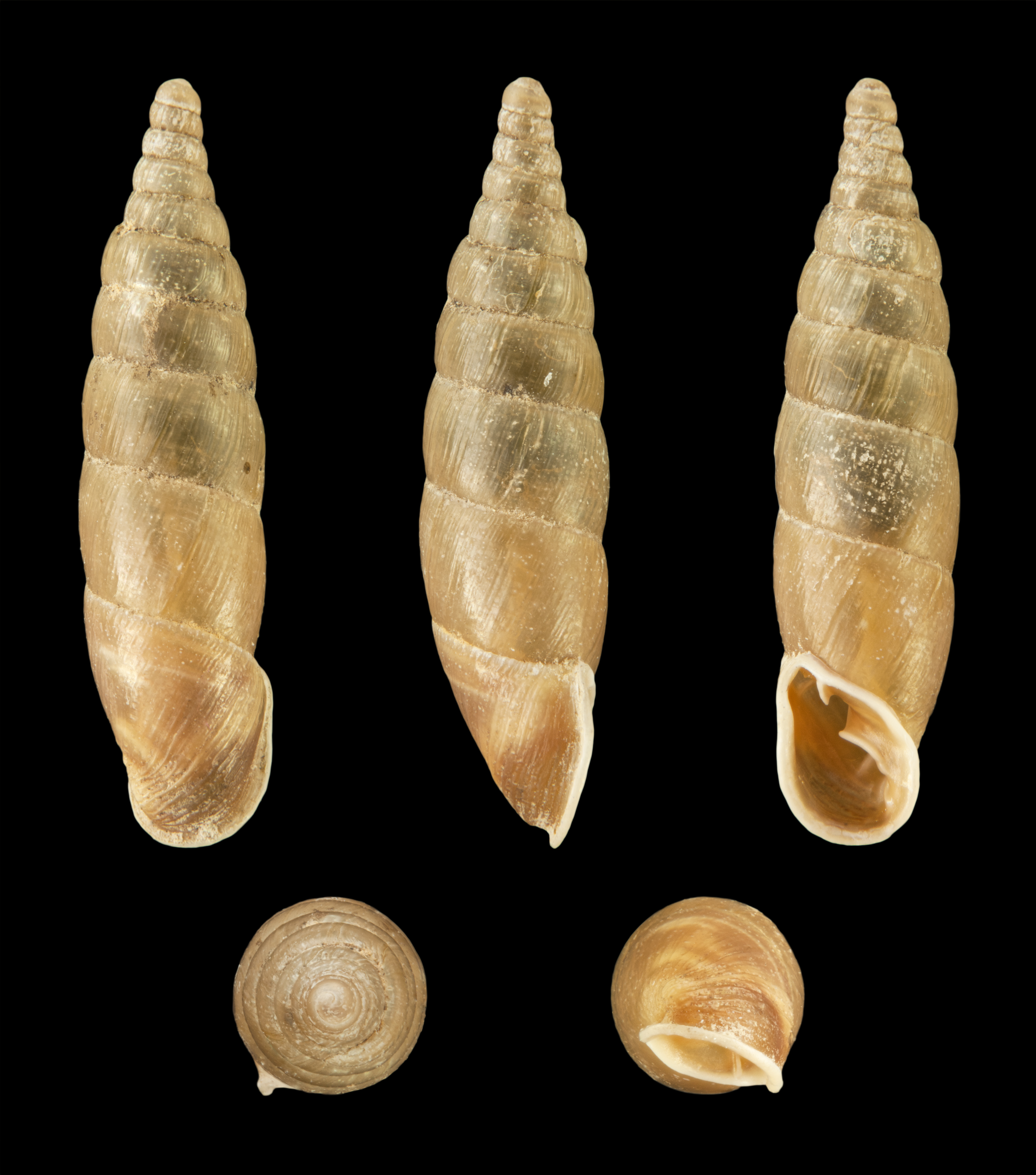
- Shell of Cochlodina laminata

Conservation status
- Least Concern (IUCN 3.1)

Scientific classification
- Kingdom: Animalia
- Phylum: Mollusca
- Class: Gastropoda
- Order: Stylommatophora
- Family: Clausiliidae
- Genus: Cochlodina
- Species: C. laminata

Binomial name
- Cochlodina laminata (Montagu, 1803)

Synonyms
- {{collap[sible list |: Clausilia (Clausiliastra) laminata (Montagu, 1803); Clausilia laminata (Montagu, 1803); Clausilia laminata var. granatina L. Pfeiffer, 1848; Clausilia laminata var. occidentalis Bourguignat, 1877; Clausilia laminata var. subrubra Wattebled, 1889; Cochlodina (Cochlodina) laminata (Montagu, 1803); Turbo laminatus Montagu, 1803; }}

= Cochlodina laminata =

Species of gastropod

Cochlodina laminata is a species of air-breathing land snail, a terrestrial pulmonate gastropod mollusk in the family Clausiliidae, the door snails, all of which have a clausilium.

Six subspecies are recognized:

- Cochlodina laminata albanica S. H. F. Jaeckel, 1956
- Cochlodina laminata grossa (Rossmässler, 1835)
- Cochlodina laminata laminata (Montagu, 1803)
- Cochlodina laminata nana (Möllendorff, 1873)
- Cochlodina laminata oreinos (A. J. Wagner, 1914)
- Cochlodina laminata partita (Westerlund, 1892)

== Distribution ==
This species occurs in much of Europe, as well as Russia and Ukraine.

== Description ==
Like all species in the family Clausiliidae, Cochlodina laminata has a clausilium or "door". The second image shows the shape of the clausilium in this species.

The shell is brown to cherry red, nearly smooth and shiny. The parietalis is small, the columellaris is more prominent, the palatal callus is weak, the subcolumellaris is visible in an oblique view.

The weight of the adult live snail is about 138±5 mg.

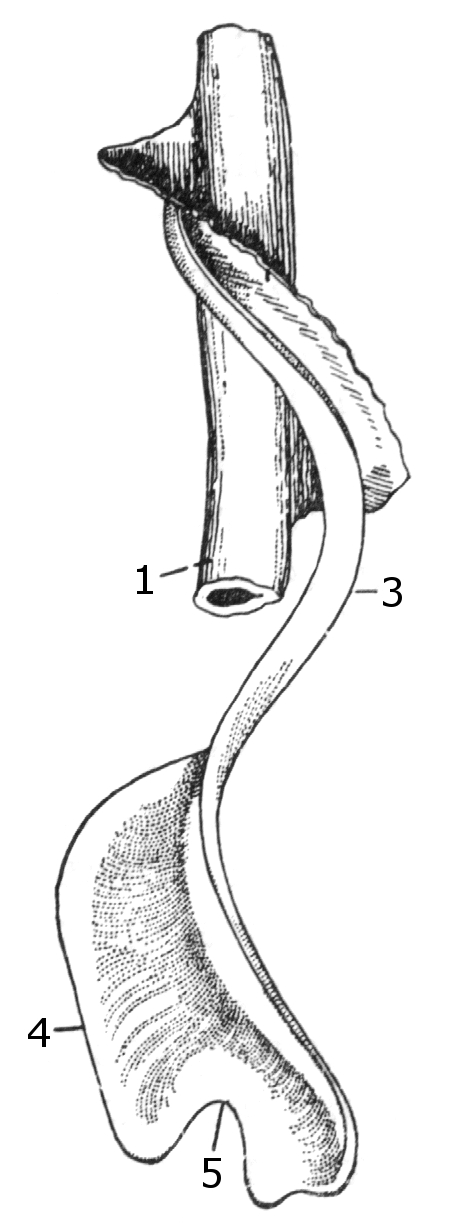
The clausilium of Cochlodina laminata
