= Clausilium =

Anatomical structure in some land snails

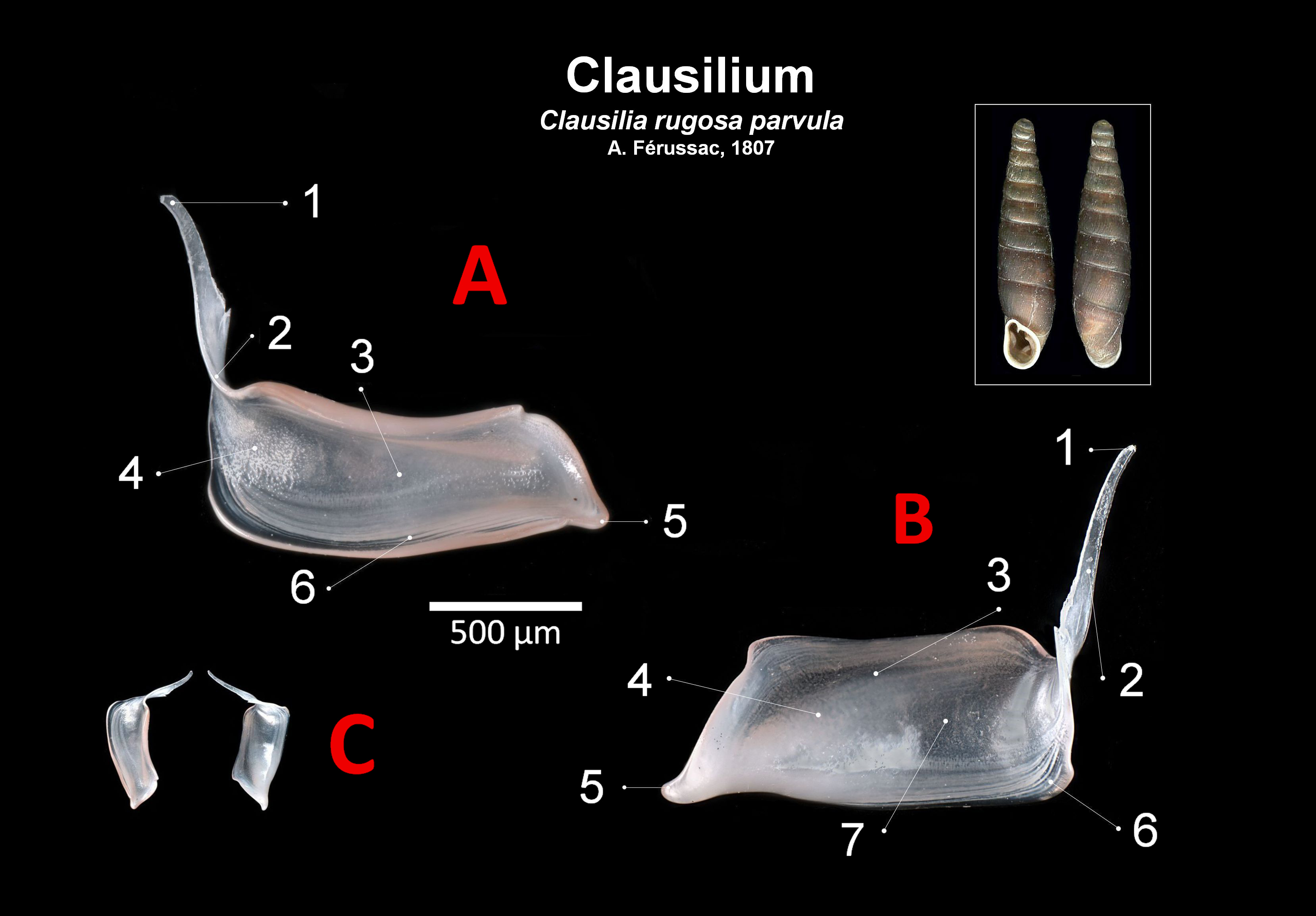
Clausilium of Clausilia rugosa parvula A: Exterior B: Interior C: Vertical views 1: Clausilium attachment point 2: Spiraled columella 3: Translucent calcareous plate 4: Uneven surface texture 5: Protruding nose 6: Growth line 7: Depression

The clausilium is a calcareous anatomical structure which is found in one group of air-breathing land snails: terrestrial pulmonate gastropod mollusks in the family Clausiliidae, the door snails. The clausilium is one part of the clausilial apparatus.

The presence of a clausilium is the reason for the common name "door snails", because all the snails in this family have a roughly spoon-shaped "door" or clausilium, which can slide down to close the aperture of the shell. However, this structure is emphatically not the same thing as an operculum, which is virtually non-existent in pulmonate snails, only occurring in the Amphiboloidea.

The exact shape of the clausilium varies from genus to genus: it can be tongue-shaped, spoon-shaped or spatula-shaped. The wide flat end of the clausilium can close the aperture of the snail shell, and thus protect the soft parts against predation by animals such as carnivorous beetle larvae. The narrow end of the clausilium slides in a groove, which is formed by spiral folds on the inside of the shell around the columella. Because the groove is long, and the muscles that control the clausilium are also long, the whole structure can be retracted into the shell. The mechanism is totally different, but the clausilium is vaguely reminiscent of an automated garage door opener.

== Gallery ==
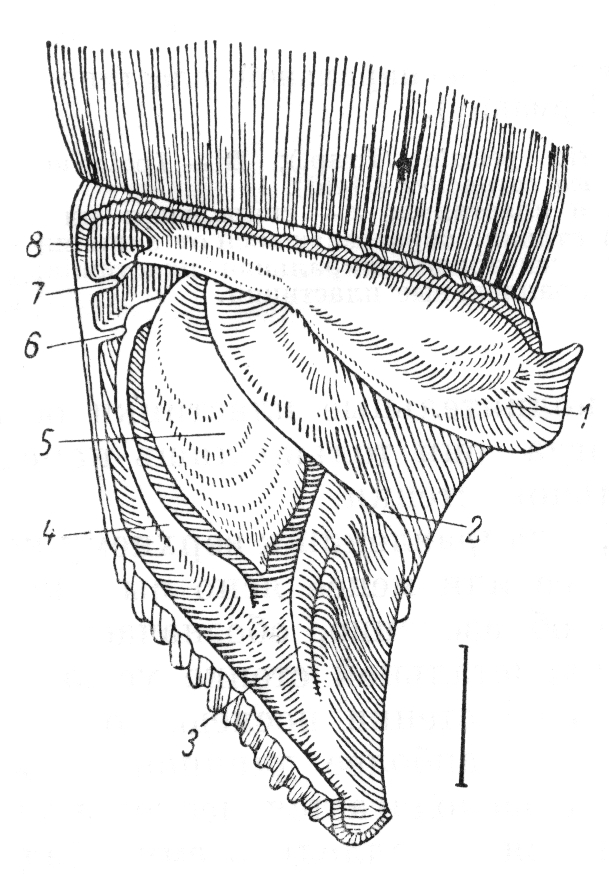
Drawing of the inner shell anatomy of Alinda biplicata shown through a partly broken-open shell. The spoon-shaped end of the clausilium is labelled number 5. Other numbers depicts various plicae and lamellae.

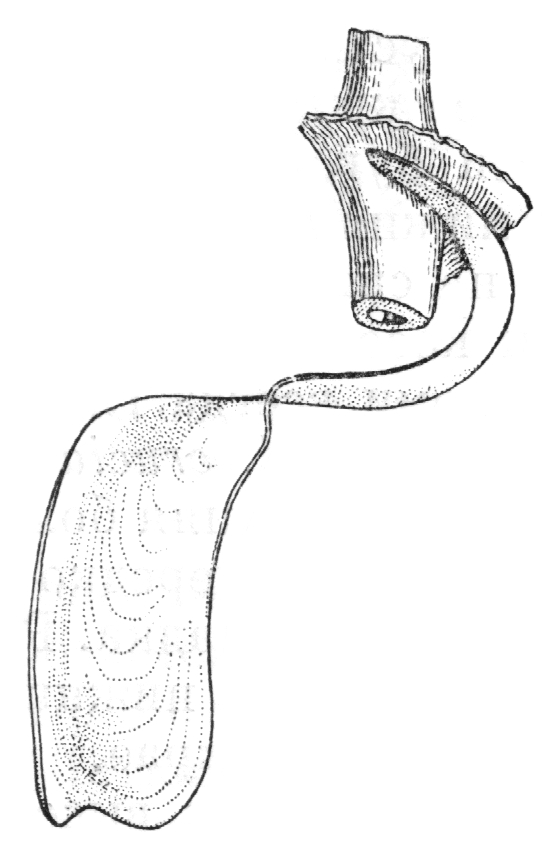
The clausilium of Clausilia dubia, as it articulates with the columella of the shell (upper right).

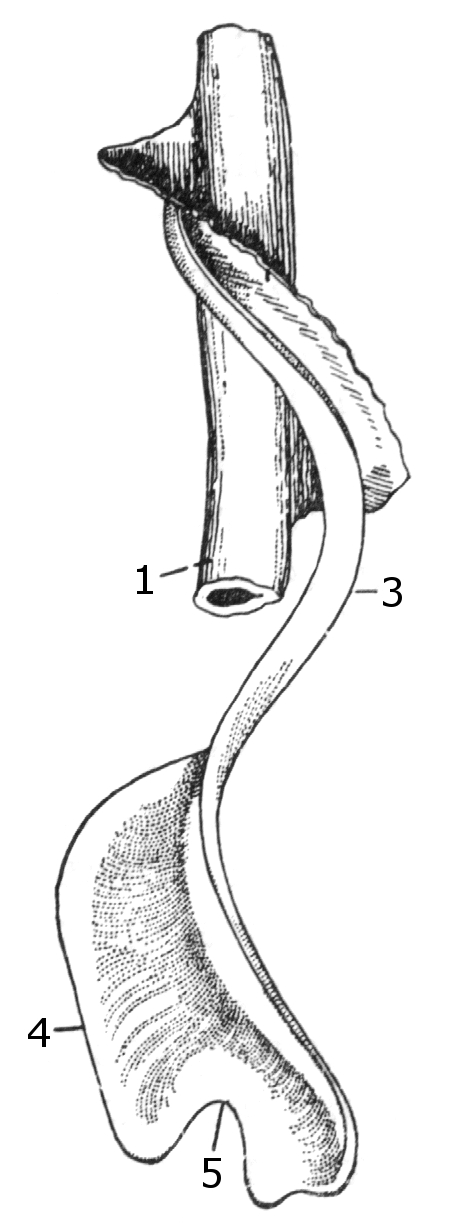
Clausilium of Cochlodina laminata.

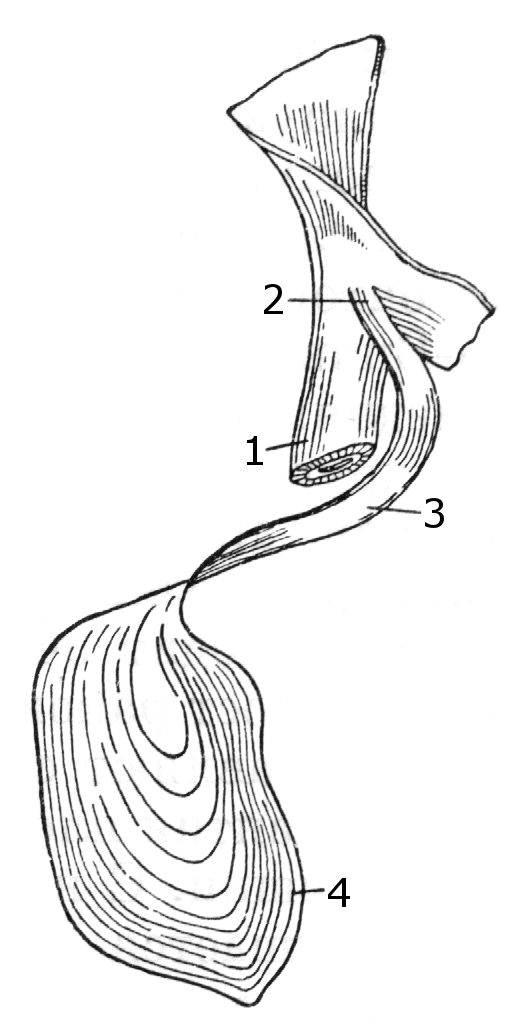
Clausilium of Macrogastra plicatula.
