= Oxychilus albuferensis =

Scientific classification
- Kingdom: Animalia
- Phylum: Mollusca
- Class: Gastropoda
- Order: Stylommatophora
- Family: Oxychilidae
- Genus: Oxychilus
- Species: O. albuferensis

Binomial name
- Oxychilus albuferensis Altaba, 2007

Species of gastropod

Oxychilus albuferensis is a species of air-breathing land snail, a terrestrial pulmonate gastropod mollusk in the family Oxychilidae, the glass snails.

The species is recognized as a of part of malacofauna of Mallorca. As of 2023 there are no detailed information about Oxychilus albuferensis since its species description.

== Distribution ==
This species occurs in Mallorca.
