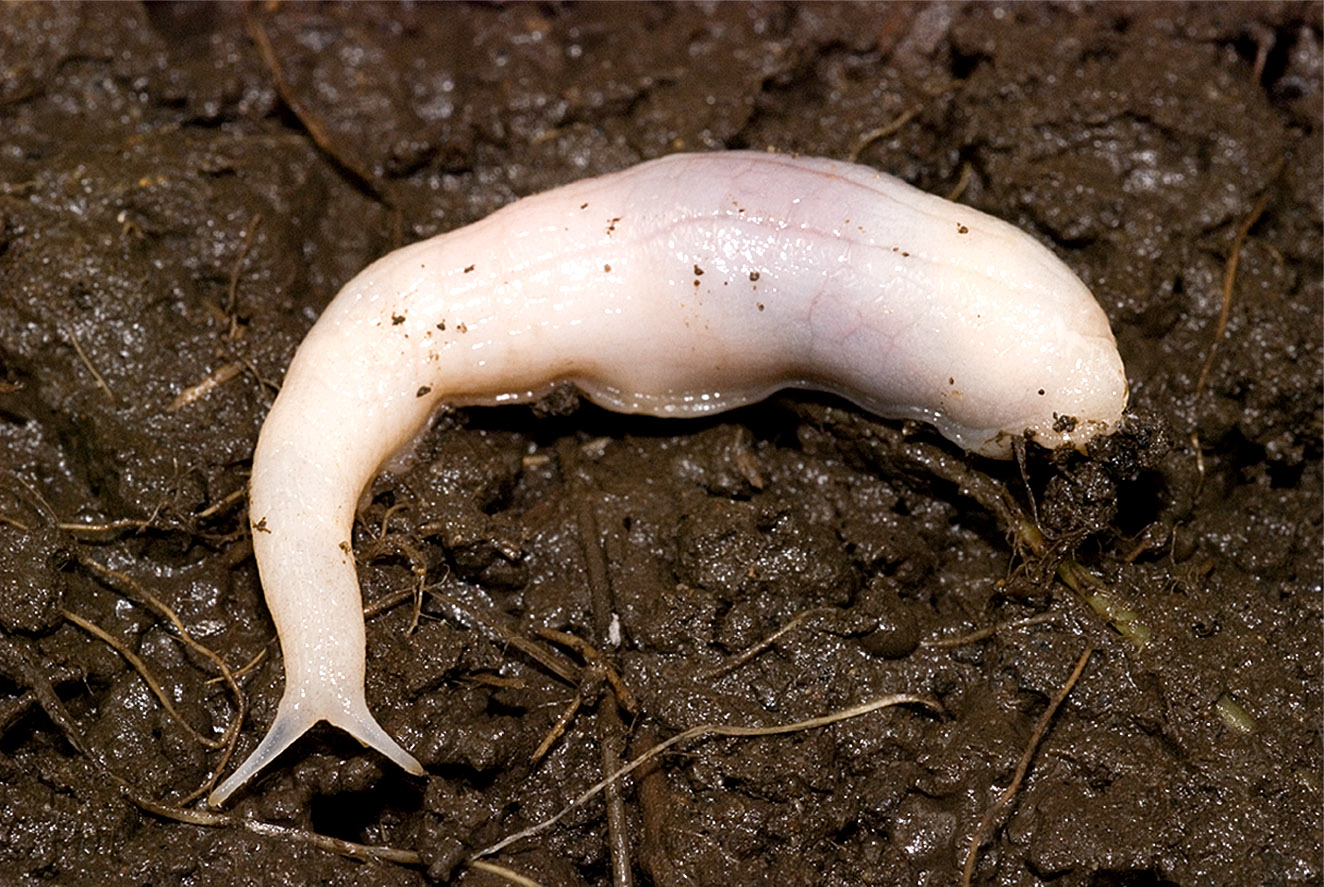
- A live Selenochlamys ysbryda, head towards lower left

Conservation status
- Data Deficient (IUCN 3.1)

Scientific classification
- Kingdom: Animalia
- Phylum: Mollusca
- Class: Gastropoda
- Order: Stylommatophora
- Family: Oxychilidae
- Genus: Selenochlamys
- Species: S. ysbryda

Binomial name
- Selenochlamys ysbryda Rowson & Symondson, 2008

= Selenochlamys ysbryda =

Ghost slug

Species of gastropod

Selenochlamys ysbryda, the ghost slug, is a species of predatory air-breathing land slug. It is a shell-less pulmonate gastropod mollusc in the family Oxychilidae, although when first described it was assumed to be in the Trigonochlamydidae.

The species was first recognised from various sites in Wales and was formally described and named in 2008 by Ben Rowson, a taxonomist at the National Museum Wales (Amgueddfa Cymru), and Bill Symondson, an ecologist at Cardiff University. It has subsequently turned up at numerous further sites in South Wales and a few sites in England, but it is believed to be an introduction in the UK, occurring mostly in gardens.

Specimens likely to be this species have also now been identified from two sites in natural mountain forest in the Crimea in Ukraine, indicating that the Crimean Mountains are within its native range.

== Description and ecology ==
This slug can reach 6.4 cm (2.5 in) in size, with its body extended. It has no eyes, and is white in colour. It is predominantly burrowing, living up to a metre underground, and rarely, at night, coming to the surface. Unlike the majority of slugs, it is a carnivore, feeding on earthworms using its blade-like teeth. Both the mantle and the breathing hole are found at the tail end of the body.

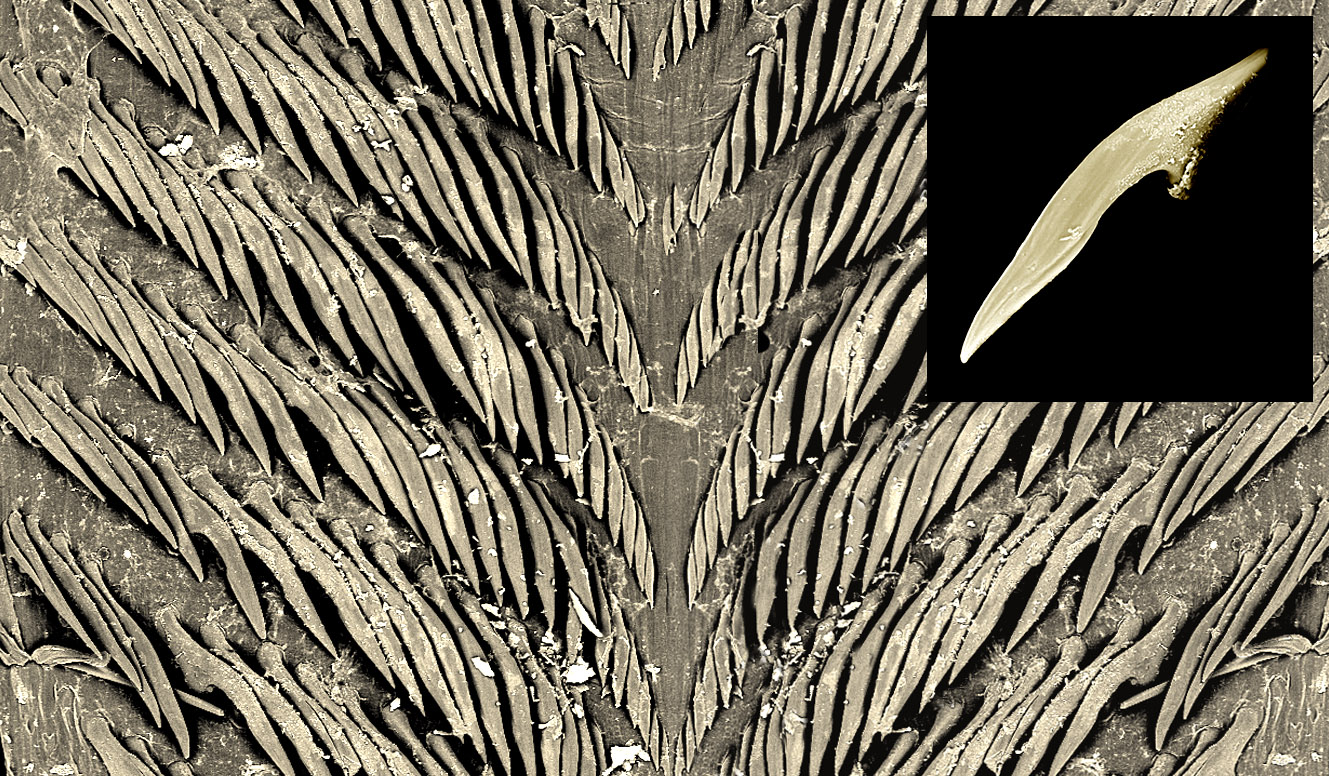
An electronmicrograph of the radula ribbon of the species. The inset shows one individual tooth.

Because of the slug's white colour and nocturnal habits, and because it is so rarely seen, it was given the species name ysbryda, the word ysbryd meaning 'ghost' in the Welsh language. This in turn gave rise to the common name "ghost slug".

== Distribution ==
Other slug species in this family are found in Turkey and Georgia, but no representatives had been found in Western Europe prior to the discovery in Britain. Although the species is almost certainly introduced, its country of origin and how it made its way into Britain was unknown at the time of its original description. Bill Symondson speculated that the slug originally evolved in cave systems alien to the UK, and may possibly have arrived in Wales in soil in a potted plant.

The first specimen was collected in the churchyard of Brecon cathedral on 29 December 2004, but its significance was overlooked at the time. A second specimen was found in a lane in Caerphilly on 29 October 2006. This single specimen was photographed and then released. A year later, another slug was found by a gardener near Cardiff, Wales, where it was brought to the attention of the National Museum Wales. By August 2014 the species was known from over 25 sites, mostly in South Wales but with a few sites in England, including an outlier in Oxfordshire. Records in Britain are usually from gardens, allotments, or nearby roads and riversides in populated areas.

The slug is not harmful to humans, but as a presumed introduced species, more records from Britain are being solicited, partly on the basis of an appeal to the public. As more information is gathered, the distribution of the species will be monitored to check that it does not become an invasive pest species as it presumably spreads across South Wales.

Two specimens of what is probably the same species (they were immature, so difficult to identify) have been recognised from two sites in the Crimean Mountains in Ukraine. The first specimen had been collected in 1989 from under a boulder in a natural mountain forest. The second was found on the floor of a cave, 10 m from the entrance. These were the first records of Selenochlamys in Crimea. The Crimean specimens differ from Selenochlamys pallida in the same way as does S. ysbryda, making it likely that they are the latter species. Because it occurs in natural habitat in the Crimean Mountains, S. ysbryda is probably native there and may be endemic.

Selenochlamys ysbryda was selected as one of "The Top 10 New Species" described in 2008 by The International Institute for Species Exploration and an international committee of taxonomists.

== Etymology ==
The specific epithet ysbryda, is derived from Welsh ysbryd, meaning a ghost or spirit. The word was Latinized by the addition of a feminine ending a, and is to be treated as a noun in apposition. The name alludes to the species' ghostly appearance, nocturnal, predatory behaviour and the element of mystery surrounding its origin.
