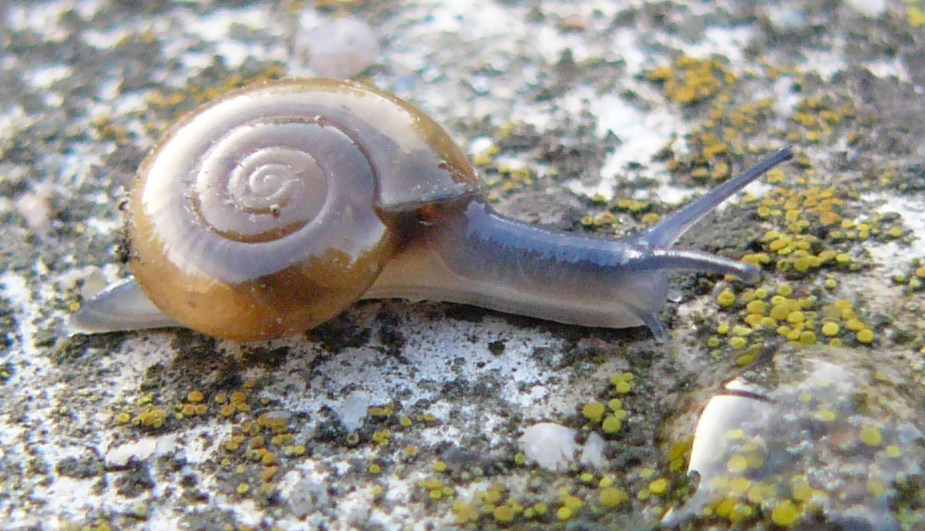
- Oxychilus draparnaudi
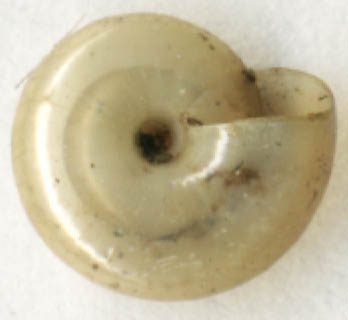
- The ventral surface of a shell of Oxychilus cellarius

Scientific classification
- Kingdom: Animalia
- Phylum: Mollusca
- Class: Gastropoda
- Order: Stylommatophora
- Superfamily: Gastrodontoidea
- Family: Oxychilidae
- Subfamily: Oxychilinae
- Genus: Oxychilus; Fitzinger, 1833

Type species
- Helix cellaria O. F. Müller, 1774

Synonyms
- List: Aplostoma Moquin-Tandon, 1855; Cretozonites Kobelt, 1890; Euhyalina Albers, 1857; Euhyalinia J. W. Taylor, 1907; Helicella Gray, 1847; Hyalina Gray, 1847; Hyalina A. Férussac, 1821; Hyalina (Euhyalina) Albers, 1857; Hyalinia Charpentier, 1837; Hyalinia (Hyalinia) Charpentier, 1837; Hyalinia (Polita) Held, 1838; Hyalofulgida Monterosato, 1892; Lindholmella C.R. Boettger, 1930; Omalota Scudder, 1882; Oxychilops C.R. Boettger, 1930; Oxychilus (Alzonula) Giusti, 1969; Oxychilus (Atlantoxychilus) A. Riedel, 1964; Oxychilus (Calloretinella) F. Haas, 1934; Oxychilus (Costoxychilus) Neubert, 1998; Oxychilus (Drouetia) Gude, 1911; Oxychilus (Helicophana) Westerlund, 1886; Oxychilus (Hyalocornea) Monterosato, 1892; Oxychilus (Hyalofusca) Monterosato, 1892; Oxychilus (Longiphallus) A. Riedel, 1958; Oxychilus (Ortizius) Forcart, 1957; Oxychilus (Oxychilus) Fitzinger, 1833; Oxychilus (Radiolus) Wollaston, 1878·; Oxychilus (Tauroxychilus) Balashov, 2016; Polita Held, 1838; Zonites (Hyalinia) Charpentier, 1837

= Oxychilus =

Genus of gastropods

Oxychilus is a genus of small air-breathing land snails, terrestrial pulmonate gastropods in the subfamily Oxychilinae of the family Oxychilidae, the glass snails.

== Species ==
The following species are recognised in the genus Oxychilus:

- Oxychilus absoloni (A. J. Wagner, 1914)
- Oxychilus aegopinoides (Maltzan, 1883)
- Oxychilus agostinhoi Martins, 1981
- Oxychilus alicurensis (Benoit, 1857)
- Oxychilus alliarius (Miller, 1822)
- Oxychilus alpedrizensis Holyoak & Mendes, 2022
- Oxychilus altimirai A. Riedel, 1972
- Oxychilus amblyopus (J. Mabille, 1869)
- Oxychilus andrei Frias Martins, 2017
- Oxychilus anjana Altonaga, 1986
- † Oxychilus applanatus (K. Miller, 1907)
- Oxychilus aracenensis Holyoak & Martín, 2022
- Oxychilus atlanticus (Morelet & Drouët, 1857)
- Oxychilus batalhanus de Winter, 1989
- Oxychilus beckmanni Falkner, 2007
- Oxychilus blauneri (Shuttleworth, 1843)
- Oxychilus brincki A. Riedel, 1964
- † Oxychilus brujasensis (Fontannes, 1884)
- Oxychilus camelinus (Bourguignat, 1852)
- Oxychilus canini (Benoit, 1843)
- Oxychilus caspius (O. Boettger, 1880)
- Oxychilus cellarius (O. F. Müller, 1774)
- † Oxychilus chantrei (Locard, 1878)
- Oxychilus clarus (Held, 1838)
- Oxychilus colliourensis (Locard, 1894)
- Oxychilus concinnus (Westerlund, 1896)
- Oxychilus costatus A. Riedel, 1989
- Oxychilus courquini (Bourguignat, 1870)
- Oxychilus cyprius (L. Pfeiffer, 1847)
- Oxychilus decipiens Riedel, 1966
- Oxychilus deilus (Bourguignat, 1857)
- Oxychilus denatale (L. Pfeiffer, 1856)
- Oxychilus denselineata (P. Hesse, 1914)
- † Oxychilus deplanatus (Thomä, 1845)
- Oxychilus diaphanellus (Krynicki, 1836)
- Oxychilus diductus (Westerlund, 1886)
- Oxychilus draparnaudi (Beck, 1837)
- Oxychilus edmundi Falkner, 2008
- Oxychilus egadiensis A. Riedel, 1973
- Oxychilus emmae (Akramowski, 1955)
- † Oxychilus falsani (Locard, 1878)
- † Oxychilus falunorum (Collot, 1911)
- Oxychilus farinesianus (Bourguignat, 1870)
- Oxychilus filicum (Krynicki, 1836)
- † Oxychilus flavus (Eichwald, 1830)
- † Oxychilus fleckensteinensis Schlickum & Geissert, 1980
- Oxychilus furtadoi Frias Martins, 1989
- † Oxychilus globosus (K. Miller, 1907)
- Oxychilus hobbit A. Riedel, 1981
- †Oxychilus irenae Schlickum & Strauch, 1979
- Oxychilus juvenostriatus A. Riedel, 1964
- Oxychilus lagrecai Giusti, 1973
- Oxychilus lathyri (J. Mabille, 1869)
- Oxychilus lederi (O. Boettger, 1880)
- Oxychilus lentiformis (Kobelt, 1882)
- Oxychilus lineolatus Martins & Ripken, 1991
- Oxychilus maceanus (Bourguignat, 1870)
- Oxychilus majori (Westerlund, 1886)
- Oxychilus mariensis Gittenberger, 2008
- Oxychilus mavromoustakisi (F. Haas, 1934)
- Oxychilus melanoides Frias Martins, 2017
- † Oxychilus mendicus (Slavík, 1869)
- Oxychilus mercadali Gasull, 1970
- Oxychilus miceui Frias Martins, 1989
- Oxychilus micromphalus Frias Martins, 2017
- Oxychilus miguelinus (L. Pfeiffer, 1856)
- Oxychilus mingrelicus (Mousson, 1863)
- Oxychilus minor A. Riedel, 1964
- Oxychilus mortilleti (Pfeiffer, 1859)
- Oxychilus navarricus (Bourguignat, 1870) - formerly known as Oxychilus helveticus (Blum, 1881)
- Oxychilus nortoni (Calcara, 1843)
- Oxychilus obscuratus (A. Villa & J. B. Villa, 1841)
- Oxychilus oglasicola Giusti, 1968
- Oxychilus oppressus (Shuttleworth, 1877)
- Oxychilus ornatus A. Riedel, 1964
- Oxychilus oschtenicus (O. Boettger, 1888)
- Oxychilus paphlagonicus A. Riedel, 1993
- Oxychilus perspectivus (Kobelt, 1881)
- Oxychilus pilula (Westerlund, 1886)
- Oxychilus pityusanus A. Riedel, 1969
- Oxychilus profundus Neubert, 1998
- Oxychilus rateranus (Servain, 1880)
- Oxychilus renanianus (Pallary, 1939)
- Oxychilus requienii (Moquin-Tandon, 1855)
- Oxychilus reticulatus (O. Boettger, 1883)
- Oxychilus scoliura Frias Martins, 1989
- Oxychilus secernendus (Retowski, 1889)
- Oxychilus seidli A. Riedel, 1999
- Oxychilus shuttleworthianus (Pini, 1883)
- Oxychilus spatiosus (Lindholm, 1922)
- Oxychilus spectabilis (Milne-Edwards, 1885)
- Oxychilus suaneticus (O. Boettger, 1883)
- Oxychilus subeffusus (Boettger, 1879)
- Oxychilus superfluus (L. Pfeiffer, 1849)
- Oxychilus tomlini (E. A. Smith, 1905)
- Oxychilus translucidus (Mortillet, 1853)
- Oxychilus tropidophorus (J. Mabille, 1869)
- Oxychilus uziellii (Issel, 1872)
- Oxychilus valicourti Bertrand, 2022
- Oxychilus viridescens Frias Martins, Brito & Backeljau, 2013
- Oxychilus volutella (L. Pfeiffer, 1856)

Species brought into synonymy

- Oxychilus amaltheae Riedel & Subai, 1982: synonym of Mediterranea amaltheae (A. Riedel & Subai, 1982) (original combination)
- Oxychilus depressus (Sterki, 1880): synonym of Mediterranea depressa (Sterki, 1880)
- Oxychilus deubeli (A. J. Wagner, 1914) - synonym: Oxychilus orientalis (Clessin, 1887); synonym of Cellariopsis deubeli (A. J. Wagner, 1914)
- Oxychilus glaber (Rossmässler, 1835): synonym of Morlina glabra (Rossmässler, 1835)
- Oxychilus inopinatus (Uličný, 1887): synonym of Mediterranea inopinata (Uličný, 1887) (unaccepted combination)
