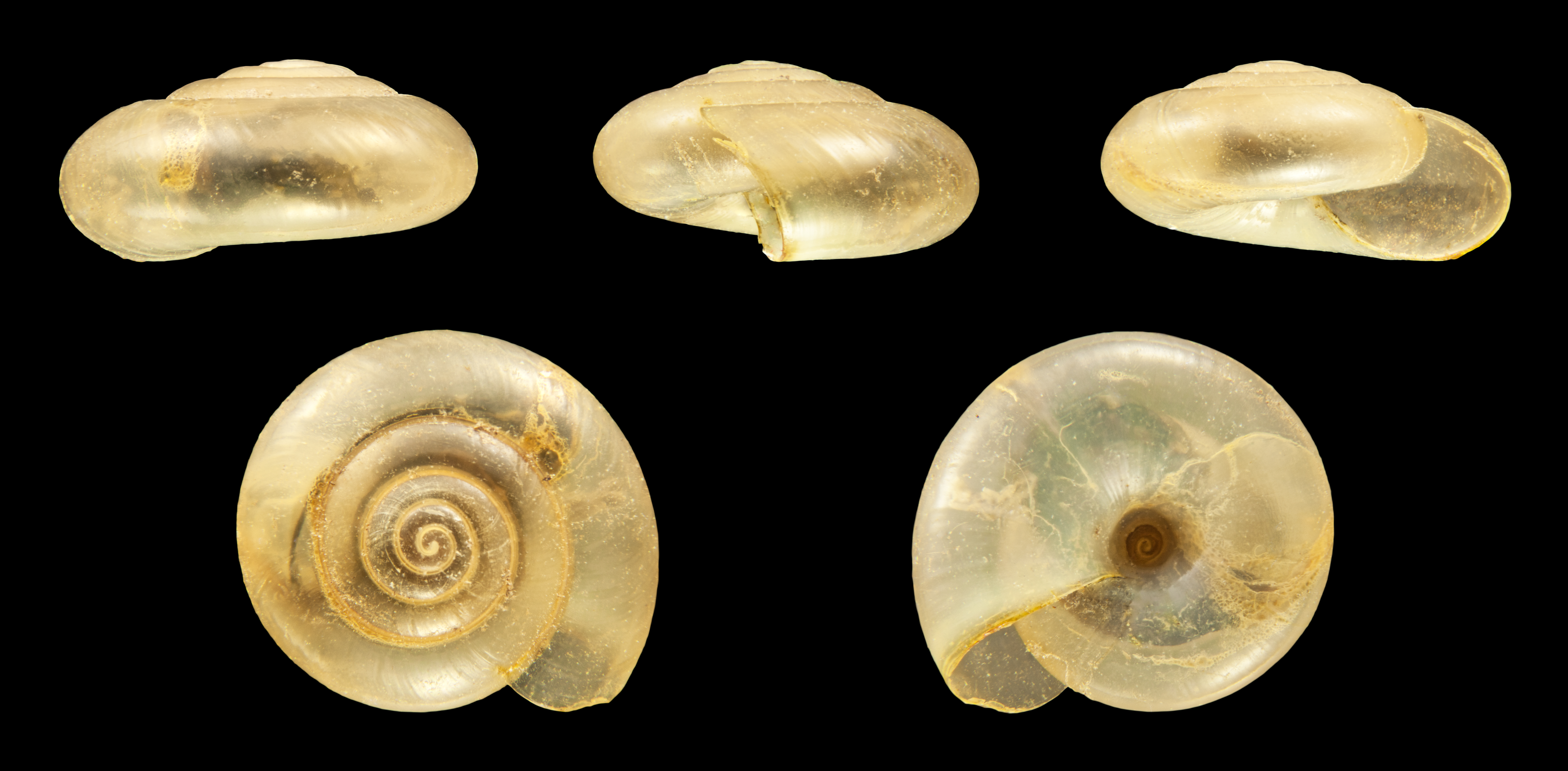
- Shell of Oxychilus alliarius

Conservation status
- Least Concern (IUCN 3.1)

- Secure (NatureServe)

Scientific classification
- Kingdom: Animalia
- Phylum: Mollusca
- Class: Gastropoda
- Order: Stylommatophora
- Family: Oxychilidae
- Genus: Oxychilus
- Species: O. alliarius

Binomial name
- Oxychilus alliarius (Miller, 1822)

Synonyms
- Helix alliaria Miller, 1822

= Oxychilus alliarius =

Species of gastropod

Oxychilus alliarius, commonly known as the garlic snail or garlic glass-snail, is a species of small, air-breathing land snail, a terrestrial pulmonate gastropod mollusk in the glass snail family, Oxychilidae.

== Etymology ==
The specific name alliarius refers to Allium which means garlic. The common name also refers to the fact that when this animal is disturbed, it gives off a strong smell similar to that of raw garlic.

== Distribution ==
This species occurs in a number of countries and islands including Great Britain, Ireland, Netherlands, Poland, the Czech Republic and other areas. The eastern boundary of its native distribution is in western Bohemia in the Czech Republic.

=== Non-indigenous distribution ===
The non-indigenous distribution of Oxychilus alliarius includes Latvia, Colombia, Hawaii, California, and New Zealand.

== Description ==
The 3.5–4 by 5–7 millimetres (0.14 in–0.16 in × 0.20 in–0.28 in) shell has four or four and a half slightly convex whorls. The last whorl is often weakly descending near aperture. The whorls from whorl 3 onwards are more narrowly coiled than in Oxychilus cellarius, the last whorl descending lower. The umbilicus is wide (one sixth of diameter). The shell is smooth, shiny, weakly reddish to greenish brown. The animal is blackish blue. Anatomy: The internal ornamentation of the proximal penis consisting of not more than four longitudinal pleats, usually straight, sometimes slightly wavy, but never laterally branched or papillate.
