= Oxychilus oglasicola =

Conservation status
- Vulnerable (IUCN 2.3)

Scientific classification
- Kingdom: Animalia
- Phylum: Mollusca
- Class: Gastropoda
- Order: Stylommatophora
- Family: Oxychilidae
- Genus: Oxychilus
- Species: O. oglasicola

Binomial name
- Oxychilus oglasicola Giusti, 1968

Species of gastropod

Oxychilus oglasicola is a species of small air-breathing land snail, a terrestrial pulmonate gastropod mollusk in the family Oxychilidae, a family of glass snails.

This species is endemic to Italy, and is threatened by habitat loss.
