= Carpathica =

Scientific classification
- Kingdom: Animalia
- Phylum: Mollusca
- Class: Gastropoda
- Order: Stylommatophora
- Family: Oxychilidae
- Genus: Carpathica; A. J. Wagner, 1895

Genus of gastropods

Carpathica is a genus of air-breathing land snails, terrestrial pulmonate gastropod mollusks in the family Oxychilidae.

== Distribution ==
Distribution of Carpathica include south-eastern Europe and Turkey.

== Description ==
Animal cannot withdraw into the shell. The shell is with 0.5-2 whorls. The last whorl is much inflated.

Reproductive system: Penis is more or less long, usually cylindrical, with appendix (flagellum) at its terminal end. Vas deferens is inserting laterally (subterminally). Retractor connects at appendix. Vagina is usually shorter, surrounded by a vaginal gland in its posterior part. Spermatheca duct is usually short and usually inserting in the zone covered by the vaginal gland. The spermatheca is spherical or ovoid. Oviduct is usually short and sometimes thinner than penis and vagina. Atrium is short.

Carpathica differs from Daudebardia in the presence of an appendix or flagellum at the apical end of the penis; vas deferens inserts subterminally (in Daudebardia terminally).

If Daudebardia transsylvanica is conspecific with Carpathica langi, which is likely if results by Alexandru Vasile Grossu (1983) are tenable (they suggest an uninterrupted gradient between both forms), then there are no differences between Daudebardia and Carpathica, neither in shell not in the anatomy, and the species classified in Carpathica should be placed in Daudebardia.

== Species ==
Species within the genus Carpathica include:

- Carpathica amisena (Forcart, 1950)
- Carpathica bielawskii Riedel, 1963
- Carpathica boettgeri (Clessin, 1883)
- Carpathica calophana (Westerlund, 1881) – type species
- Carpathica cretica (Forcart, 1950)
- Carpathica denticulata Grossu, 1969
- Carpathica insularis Riedel, 1988
- Carpathica langi (Pfeiffer, 1846)
- Carpathica stussineri (Wagner, 1895)
- Carpathica wirthi Forcart, 1971
