= Nastia viridula =

Scientific classification
- Kingdom: Animalia
- Phylum: Mollusca
- Class: Gastropoda
- Order: Stylommatophora
- Family: Oxychilidae
- Genus: Nastia
- Species: N. viridula

Binomial name
- Nastia viridula Riedel, 1989

Species of gastropod

Nastia viridula is a species of small, air-breathing land snail, a terrestrial pulmonate gastropod mollusk in the family Oxychilidae.

== Description ==
The width of the shell is 12 mm (0.47 in).

== Distribution ==
The distribution of Nastia viridula includes north-eastern Turkey.
