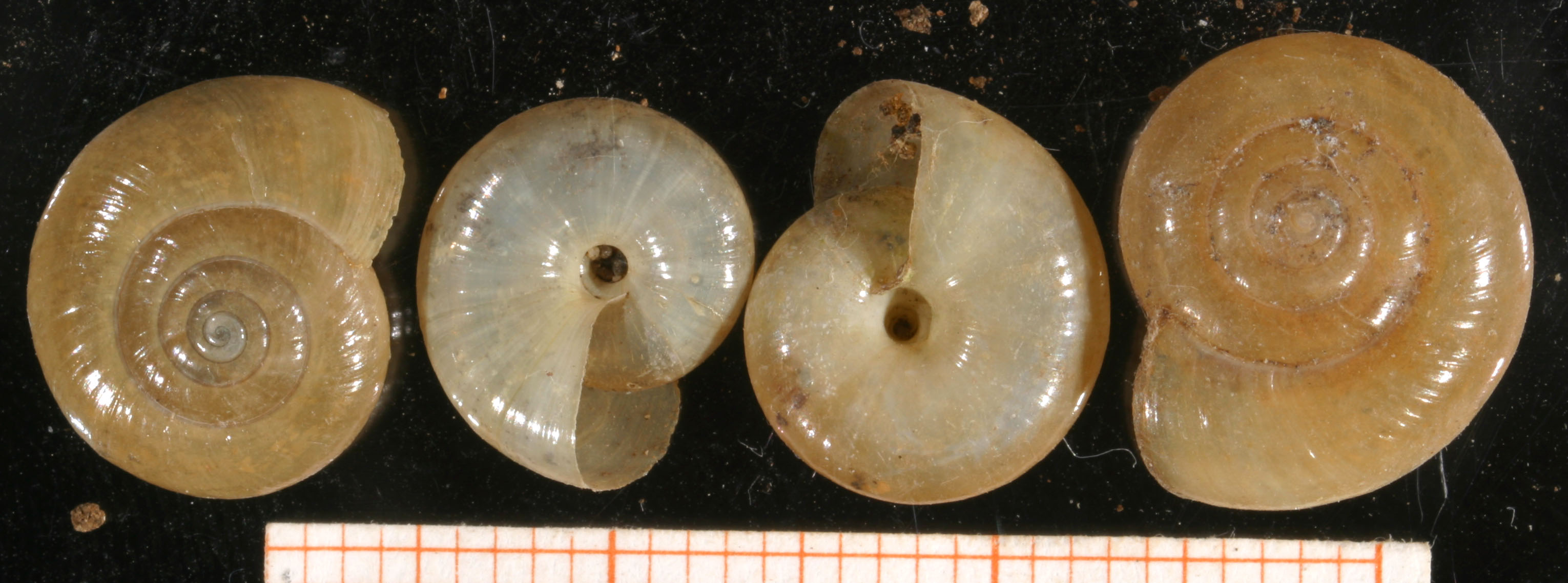
- Four shells of Oxychilus mortilleti

Scientific classification
- Kingdom: Animalia
- Phylum: Mollusca
- Class: Gastropoda
- Order: Stylommatophora
- Family: Oxychilidae
- Genus: Oxychilus
- Species: O. mortilleti

Binomial name
- Oxychilus mortilleti (L. Pfeiffer, 1859)

Synonyms
- Helix Mortilleti Pfeiffer, 1859

= Oxychilus mortilleti =

Species of gastropod

Oxychilus mortilleti is a species of air-breathing land snail, a terrestrial pulmonate gastropod mollusk in the family Oxychilidae.

The specific name mortilleti is in honor of French scientist Louis Laurent Gabriel de Mortillet (1821–1898).

== Distribution ==
The type locality is Lombardia, northern Italy.

This species is known to occur in:

- Czech Republic - in Bohemia only
