= Mediterranea (disambiguation) =

Mediterranea is the region of lands around the Mediterranean Sea.

Mediterranea may also refer to:

- Mediterranea (film), a 2015 film directed by Jonas Carpignano
- Mediterranea (song), a 2020 song by Irama
- Mediterranea (gastropod), a genus of gastropods
- Adora Mediterranea, a Spirit-class cruise ship operated by Adora Cruises that was formerly known as Mediterranea
