= Carpathica calophana =

Scientific classification
- Kingdom: Animalia
- Phylum: Mollusca
- Class: Gastropoda
- Order: Stylommatophora
- Family: Oxychilidae
- Genus: Carpathica
- Species: C. calophana

Binomial name
- Carpathica calophana (Westerlund, 1881)

Species of gastropod

Carpathica calophana is a species of air-breathing land snail, a terrestrial pulmonate gastropod mollusk in the family Oxychilidae.

== Distribution ==
The distribution of this species is eastern-carpathian.

It occurs in:

- Slovakia
- Ukraine
