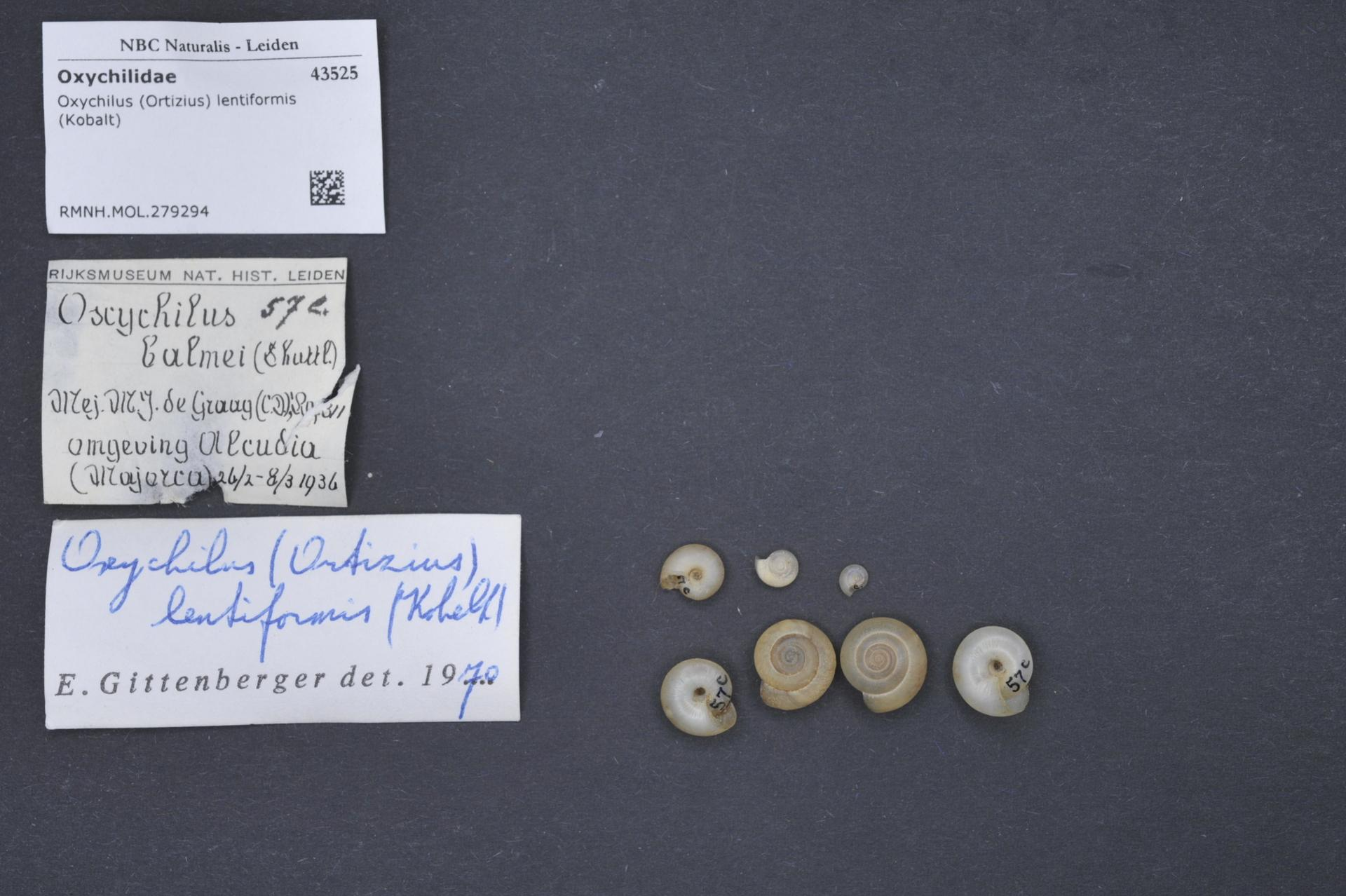
- Oxychilus lentiformis shells

Scientific classification
- Kingdom: Animalia
- Phylum: Mollusca
- Class: Gastropoda
- Order: Stylommatophora
- Family: Oxychilidae
- Genus: Oxychilus
- Species: O. lentiformis

Binomial name
- Oxychilus lentiformis Kobelt, 1882

= Oxychilus lentiformis =

Species of gastropod

Oxychilus lentiformis is a species of air-breathing land snail, a terrestrial pulmonate gastropod mollusk in the family Oxychilidae, the glass snails.

== Distribution ==
This species is found in Mallorca.
