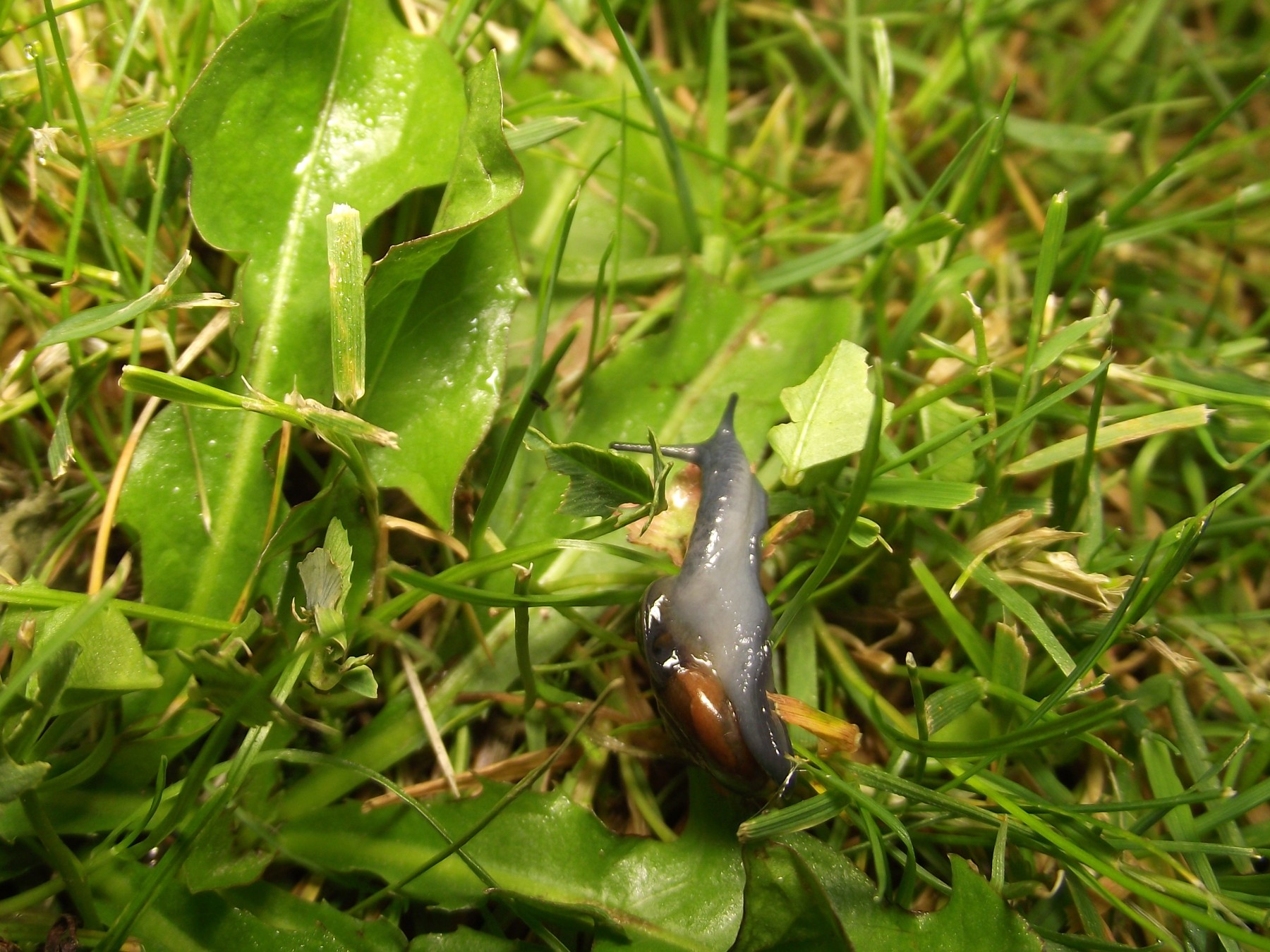
- A live individual of Oxychilus cellarius, the shell seen from the side

Conservation status
- Least Concern (IUCN 3.1)

- Secure (NatureServe)

Scientific classification
- Kingdom: Animalia
- Phylum: Mollusca
- Class: Gastropoda
- Order: Stylommatophora
- Family: Oxychilidae
- Genus: Oxychilus
- Species: O. cellarius

Binomial name
- Oxychilus cellarius (O. F. Müller, 1774)

Synonyms
- Helix cellaria Müller, 1774

= Oxychilus cellarius =

Species of gastropod

Oxychilus cellarius, common name cellar glass-snail, is a species of small air-breathing land snail, a terrestrial pulmonate gastropod mollusk in the family Oxychilidae, the glass snails.

== Description ==
The shell has 5.5-6 regularly increasing whorls. The last whorl is not inflated and narrower than in Oxychilus draparnaudi. The shell is nearly smooth and shiny and only very faintly striated. The umbilicus is moderately deep and open.

The width of the shell is 7–11 mm, 0.28–0.43 in (14 mm, 0.55 in maximum). The height of the shell is 4.5–6 mm, 0.18–0.24 in.

The animal is usually pale bluish grey. Genitalia: Penis cylindrical without constrictions (in contrast to Oxychilus draparnaudi), rows of papillae of penis continuous without interruption (interrupted at the constriction in Oxychilus draparnaudi).

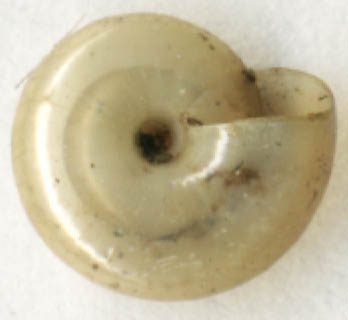
Photo of the shell.

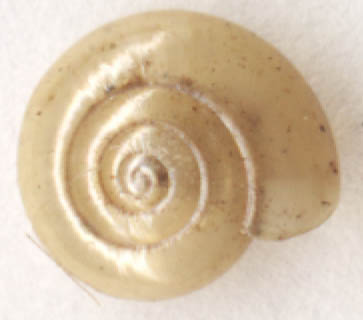
Photo of the shell.

== Distribution ==
This species occurs in countries and islands including:

- Czech Republic
- Poland
- Slovakia
- Great Britain
- Ireland
- New Zealand (e.g. Dunedin).

== Habitat ==
Oxychilus cellarius occurs in a number of habitats, like in forests and in habitats modified by humans, such as gardens and green houses.
