= Oxychilus lineolatus =

Conservation status
- Least Concern (IUCN 3.1)

Scientific classification
- Kingdom: Animalia
- Phylum: Mollusca
- Class: Gastropoda
- Order: Stylommatophora
- Family: Oxychilidae
- Genus: Oxychilus
- Species: O. lineolatus

Binomial name
- Oxychilus lineolatus Martins & Ripken, 1991

Species of gastropod

Oxychilus lineolatus is a species of small air-breathing land snail, a terrestrial pulmonate gastropod mollusk in the family Oxychilidae, the glass snails. This species is endemic to the Azores.
