= Oxychilus agostinhoi =

Conservation status
- Critically Endangered (IUCN 3.1)

Scientific classification
- Kingdom: Animalia
- Phylum: Mollusca
- Class: Gastropoda
- Order: Stylommatophora
- Family: Oxychilidae
- Genus: Oxychilus
- Species: O. agostinhoi

Binomial name
- Oxychilus agostinhoi Martins, 1981

Species of gastropod

Oxychilus agostinhoi is a species of small air-breathing land snail, a terrestrial pulmonate gastropod mollusk in the family Oxychilidae, the glass snails. This species is endemic to Azores islands (Portugal).
