= Hyaline shield =

Part of the radula in some molluscs

The hyaline shield (hy.sh.) attached to an Octopus radula. Scale bar: 0.5 mm.

The hyaline shield is a part of the radula in many kinds of molluscs. It serves as an attachment point for the muscles that retract the radula, and is thus located on the upper surface of the radula, arching backwards into the mouth. This retraction fires any food particles backwards into the mouth.

The hyaline shield is constructed from chitin and is present in most radula-bearing molluscan groups, including the cephalopods and the chitons.
