= Selenochlamys pallida =

Scientific classification
- Kingdom: Animalia
- Phylum: Mollusca
- Class: Gastropoda
- Order: Stylommatophora
- Family: Oxychilidae
- Genus: Selenochlamys
- Species: S. pallida

Binomial name
- Selenochlamys pallida O. Boettger, 1883

Synonyms
- Selenochlamys plumbea Simroth, 1912

Species of gastropod

Selenochlamys pallida is a species of predatory air-breathing land slug. It is a shell-less pulmonate gastropod mollusc in the family Oxychilidae.

Selenochlamys pallida is the type species of the genus Selenochlamys.

== Distribution ==
The distribution of Selenochlamys pallida includes:

- Western Georgia
- Abkhazia
- South of Maykop, Russia
- Northern Turkey (Vilayets Samsum, Çoruh)

The type locality is Kutaisi, Georgia.

== Description ==
The size of preserved specimens is 13–18 mm. Live individuals are larger.

== Ecology ==
Selenochlamys pallida is found in Turkey. It lives under stones or in moss, in mountains that have deciduous forests.
