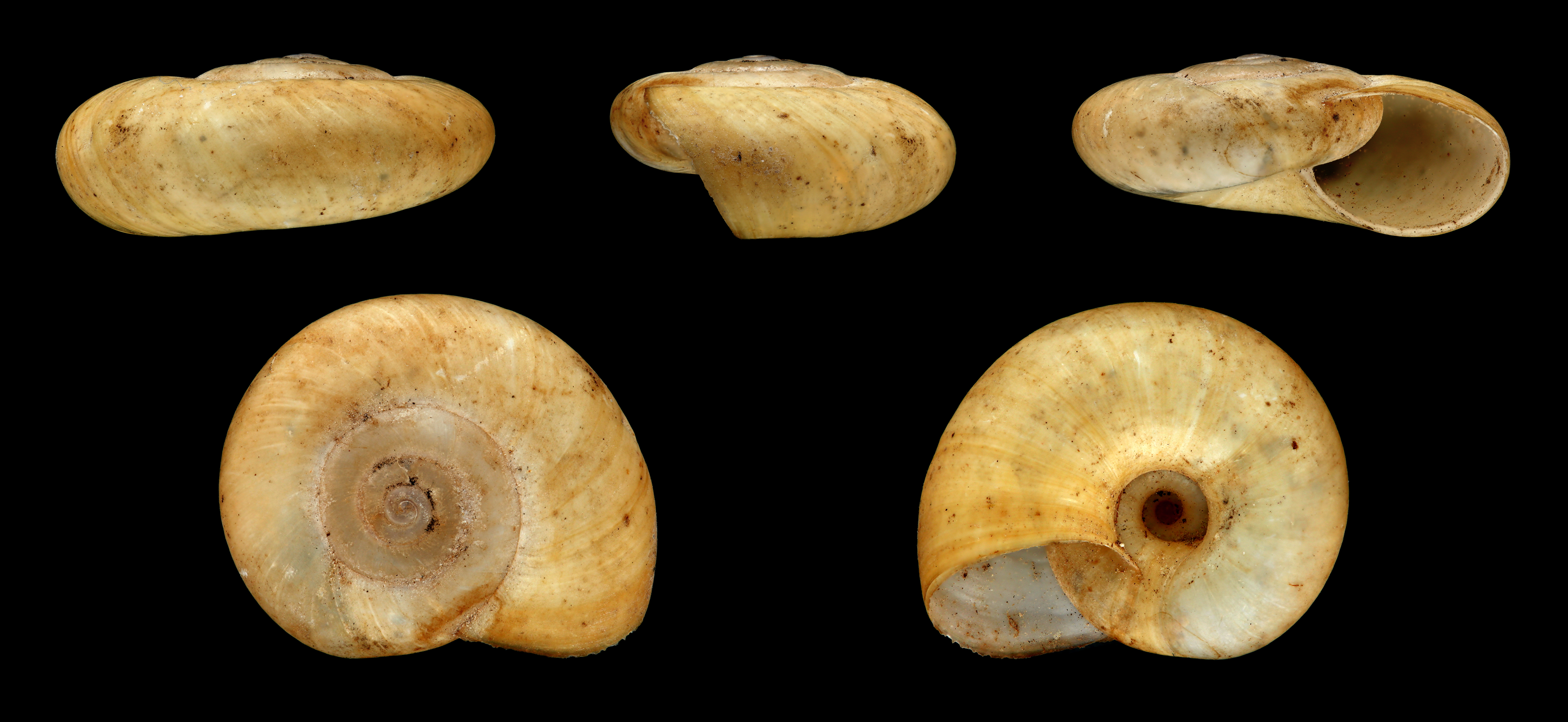
- Eopolita protensa

Scientific classification
- Domain: Eukaryota
- Kingdom: Animalia
- Phylum: Mollusca
- Class: Gastropoda
- Order: Stylommatophora
- Family: Oxychilidae
- Genus: Eopolita; Pollonera, 1916

= Eopolita =

Genus of molluscs

Eopolita is a genus of gastropods belonging to the family Oxychilidae.

The species of this genus are found in Mediterranean.

Species:

- Eopolita derbentina (Boettger, 1886)
- Eopolita forcarti (Brandt, 1958)
- Eopolita protensa (Férussac, 1832)
