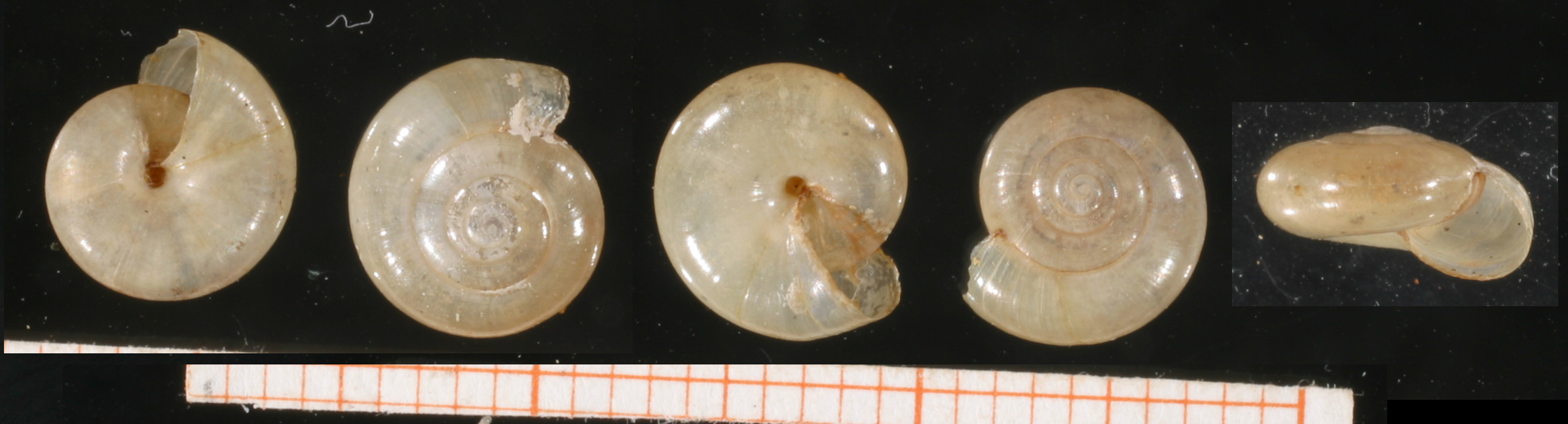

Scientific classification
- Kingdom: Animalia
- Phylum: Mollusca
- Class: Gastropoda
- Order: Stylommatophora
- Family: Oxychilidae
- Genus: Mediterranea
- Species: M. depressa

Binomial name
- Mediterranea depressa (Sterki, 1880)

Synonyms
- Hyalina depressa Sterki, 1880 (original combination); Oxychilus (Riedelius) depressus (Sterki, 1880)

= Mediterranea depressa =

Species of gastropod

Mediterranea depressa is a species of air-breathing land snail, a terrestrial pulmonate gastropod mollusc in the family Oxychilidae.

== Distribution ==
This species is known to occur in the Czech Republic, Ukraine, Germany and other countries.
