= Nastia (gastropod) =

Scientific classification
- Kingdom: Animalia
- Phylum: Mollusca
- Class: Gastropoda
- Order: Stylommatophora
- Family: Oxychilidae
- Genus: Nastia; Riedel, 1989

Genus of gastropods

Nastia is a genus of air-breathing land snails, terrestrial gastropod mollusks in the family Oxychilidae.

Nastia is the type genus of the subfamily Nastiinae, which, sometimes, is a synonym of Oxychilinae.

== Distribution ==
Distribution of Nastia include north-eastern Turkey.

== Species ==
Species within the genus Nastia include:

- Nastia viridula Riedel, 1989 - type species
