= Radula =

Anatomical structure of mollusks used for eating

The radula (US: /ˈrædʒʊlə/; pl.: radulae or radulas) is an anatomical structure found only in most mollusks, serving as their primary feeding tool. Often compared to a tongue, this minutely toothed, chitinous ribbon typically functions by scraping or cutting food before it enters the esophagus. Mollusks in every class possess a radula, except for bivalves, which instead employ waving cilia to draw in minute organisms for feeding.

The radula typically functions as a rasping organ to scrape food particles. However, its form and use have diversified significantly; it is modified for drilling holes in prey shells (e.g., in Muricidae), transformed into venomous harpoons (e.g., in Conidae using conotoxins), or reduced/lost in fluid feeders (such as in the Pyramidellidae where the highly specialized, needle-like radula is called a stylet).

Within the gastropods, the radula is used in feeding by both herbivorous and carnivorous snails and slugs. The arrangement of teeth (denticles) on the radular ribbon varies considerably from one group to another.

In most of the more ancient lineages of gastropods, the radula is used to graze, by scraping diatoms and other microscopic algae off rock surfaces and other substrates.

Predatory marine snails such as the Naticidae use the radula plus an acidic secretion to bore through the shell of other mollusks. Other predatory marine snails, such as the Conidae, use a specialized radular tooth as a poisoned harpoon. Predatory pulmonate land slugs, such as the ghost slug, use elongated razor-sharp teeth on the radula to seize and devour earthworms. Predatory cephalopods, such as squid, use the radula for cutting prey.

The introduction of the term "radula" (Latin, "little scraper") is usually attributed to the Russian zoologist Alexander von Middendorff in 1847.

== Components ==
A typical radula comprises a number of bilaterally-symmetrical self-similar rows of teeth rooted in a radular membrane in the floor of their mouth cavity. Some species have teeth that bend with the membrane as it moves over the odontophore, whereas in other species, the teeth are firmly rooted in place, and the entire radular structure moves as one entity.

=== Radular membrane ===
The elastic, delicate radular membrane may be a single tongue, or may split into two (bipartite).

=== Hyaline shield ===
See Hyaline shield for more details.

=== Odontophore ===
The odontophore is the eversible, fleshy tongue underlying the radular membrane. It controls the organ's protrusion and return. It can be likened to a pulley wheel over which the radular 'string' is pulled.

=== Teeth ===
The radula comprises multiple, identical (or near-enough) rows of teeth, fine, flat, or spiney out-growths; often, each tooth in a row (along with its symmetric partner) will have a unique morphology.

Each tooth can be divided into three sections: a base, a shaft, and a cusp. In radulae that sweep (rather than rasp) the underlying substrate, the shaft and cusp are often continuous and cannot be differentiated.

The radular teeth can generally bend in a sideways direction. In the patellogastropods, though, the teeth lost this ability and became fixed.

The teeth often tesselate with their neighbours, and this interlocking serves to make it more difficult for them to be removed from the radular ribbon.

== Radula formulae ==
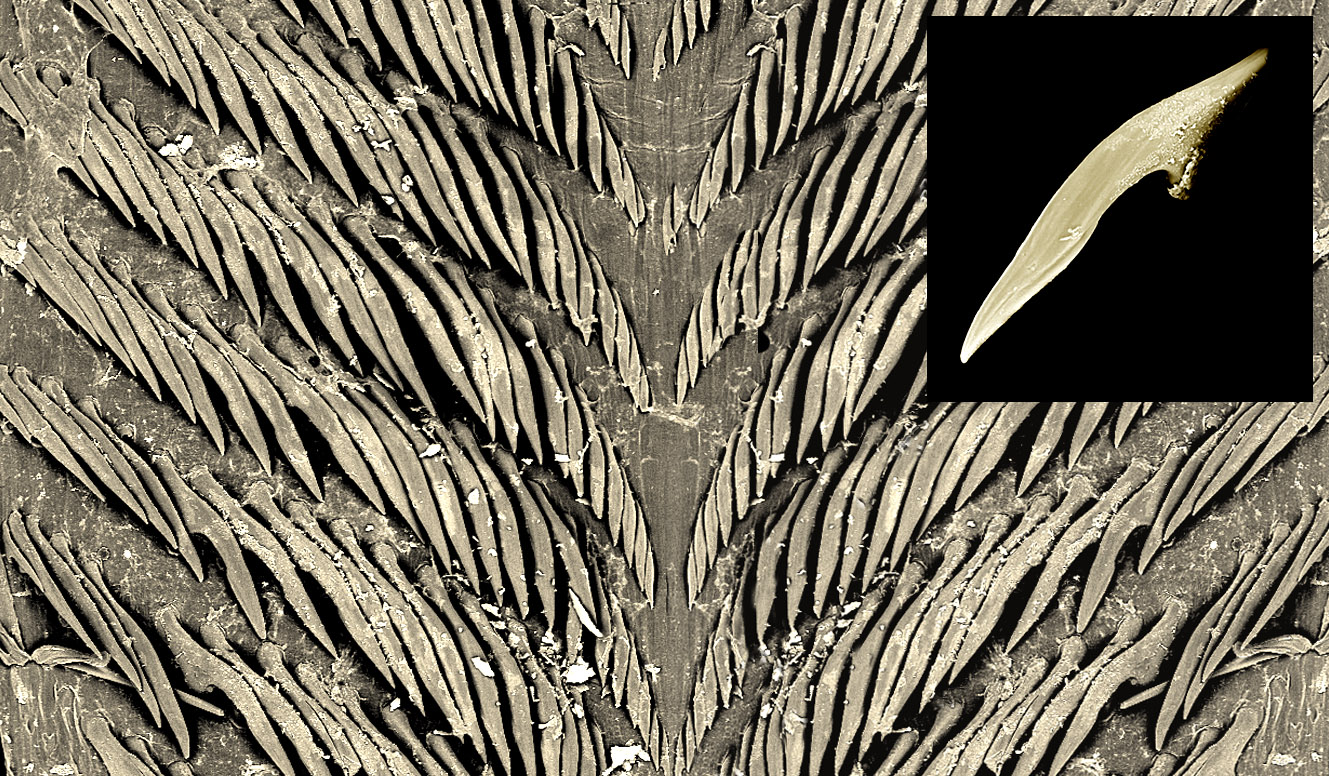
Radula and individual tooth of the predatory ghost slug, Selenochlamys ysbryda

The number, shape, and specialized arrangement of molluscan teeth in each transverse row is consistent on a radula, and the different patterns can be used as a diagnostic characteristic to identify the species in many cases.

Each row of radular teeth consists of

- One central or median tooth (or rachidian tooth, rachis tooth)
- On each side: one or more lateral teeth
- And then beyond that: one or more marginal teeth.

This arrangement is expressed in a radular tooth formula, with the following abbreviations :

- R : designates the central tooth or the rachis tooth (in case of lack of central tooth : the zero sign 0)
- the lateral teeth on each side are expressed by a specific number or D, in case the outer lateral tooth is dominant.
- the marginal teeth are designated by a specific number or, in case they are in very large numbers, the infinity symbol ∞

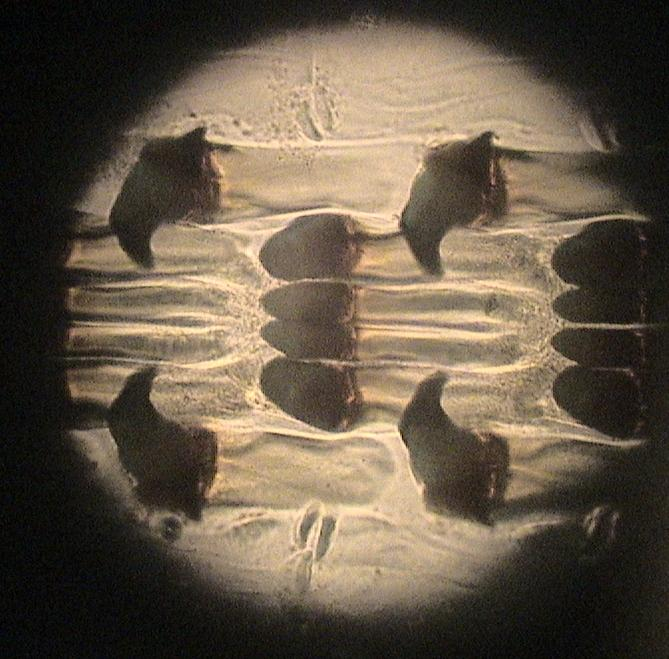
Microscopic detail of a docoglossan radula showing the denticles or teeth

This can be expressed in a typical formula such as:

3 + D + 2 + R + 2 + D + 3

This formula means: Across the radula there are 3 marginal teeth, 1 dominant lateral tooth, 2 lateral teeth, and one central tooth.

Another formula for describing radulae omits the use of letters and simply gives a sequence of numbers in the order marginal-lateral-rachidian-lateral-marginal, thus:

1-1-1-1-1

This particular formula, which is common to the scaphopods, means one marginal tooth, one lateral tooth, one rachidian tooth, one lateral tooth, and one marginal tooth across the ribbon.

== Morphology ==
The morphology of the radula is related to diet. However, it is not fixed per species; some mollusks can adapt the form of their radular teeth according to which food sources are abundant.

Pointed teeth are best suited to grazing on algal tissue, whereas blunt teeth are preferable if feeding habits entail scraping epiphytes from surfaces.

== Use ==
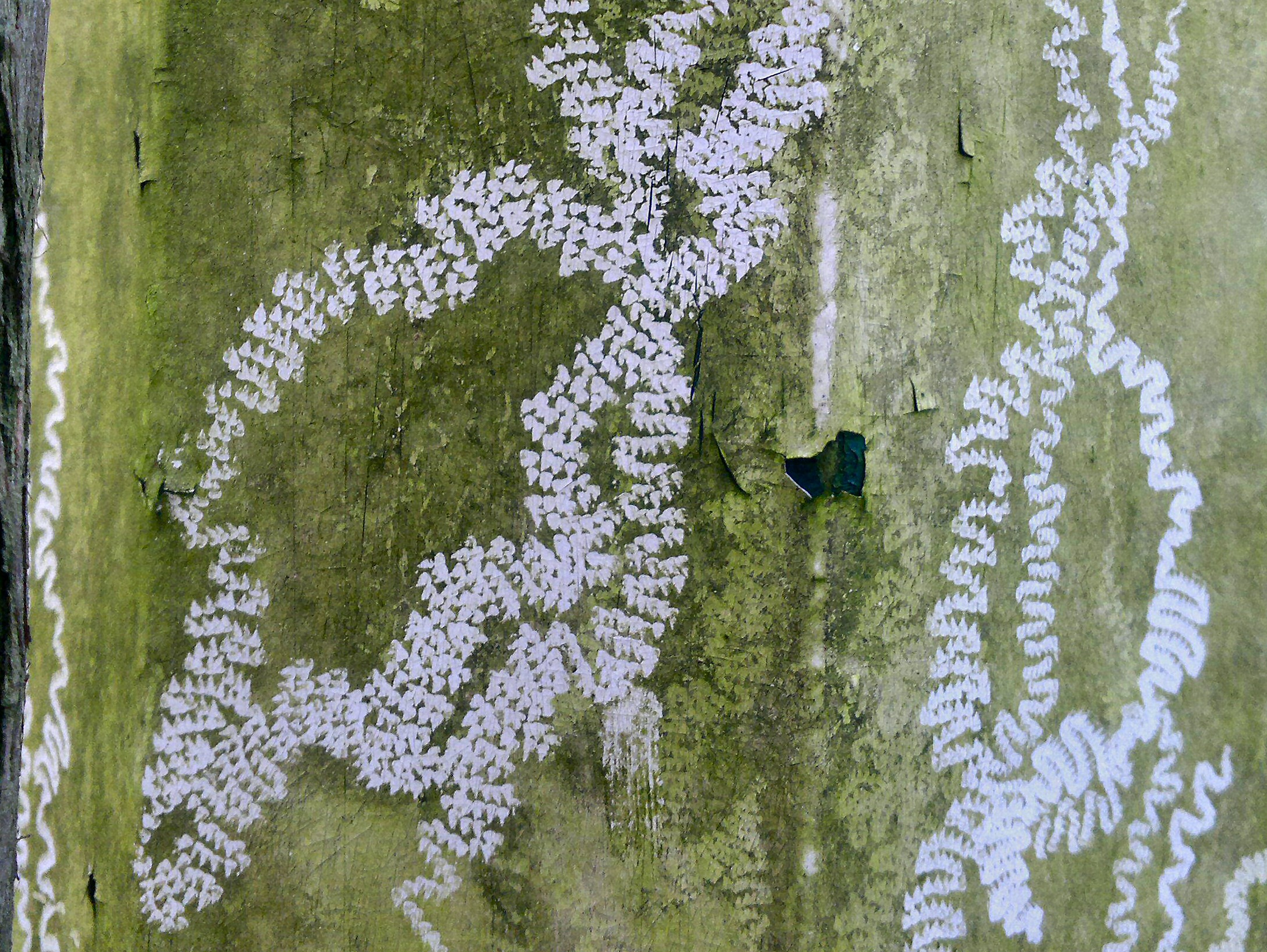
Tracks made by terrestrial gastropods with their radulas, scraping green algae from a surface inside a greenhouse

The radula is used in two main ways: either as a rake, generally to comb up microscopic, filamentous algae from a surface; or as a rasp, to feed directly on a plant. The rhipidoglossan (see below) and, to a lesser extent, the taenigloissan radular types are suited to less strenuous modes of feeding, brushing up smaller algae or feeding on soft forms; mollusks with such radulae are rarely able to feed on leathery or coralline algae. On the other hand, the docoglossan gastropod radula allows a very similar diet to the polyplacophora, feeding primarily on these resistant algae, although microalgae are also consumed by species with these radular types.

The sacoglossans (sea slugs) form an interesting anomaly in that their radula comprises a single row; they feed by sucking on cell contents, rather than rasping at tissue, and most species feed on a single genus or species of alga. Here, the shape of the radular teeth has a close match with the food substrate on which they are used. Triangular teeth are suited to diets of calcified algae, and are also present in radulae used to graze on Caulerpa; in both these cases the cell walls are predominantly composed of xylan. Sabot-shaped teeth – rods with a groove along one side – are associated with diets of crossed-fibrillar cellulose-walled algae, such as the Siphonocladaceae and Cladophorales, whereas blade-shaped teeth are more generalist.

== Early mollusks ==
The first bona fide radula dates to the Early Cambrian, although trace fossils from the earlier Ediacaran have been suggested to have been made by the radula of the organism Kimberella.

A so-called radula from the early Cambrian was discovered in 1974, this one preserved with fragments of the mineral ilmenite suspended in a quartz matrix, and showing similarities to the radula of the modern cephalopod Sepia. However, this was since re-interpreted as Salterella. [/Volborthella?]

Based on the bipartite nature of the radular dentition pattern in solenogasters, larval gastropods and larval polyplacophora, it has been postulated that the ancestral mollusk bore a bipartite radula (although the radular membrane may not have been bipartite).

== In chitons ==
Each row of the polyplacophoran radula has two mineralized teeth used to abrade the substrate, and two longer teeth that sweep up any debris. The other 13 teeth on each row do not appear to be involved in feeding.

The teeth of Chaetopleura apiculata comprise fibres surrounded by magnetite, sodium and magnesium.

== In gastropods ==
Diagrammatic saggital view of the buccal cavity of a gastropod, showing the radula and how it is used. The rest of the body of the snail is shown in green. The food is shown in blue. Muscles that control the radula are shown in brown. The surface of the radular ribbon, with numerous teeth, is shown as a zig-zag line

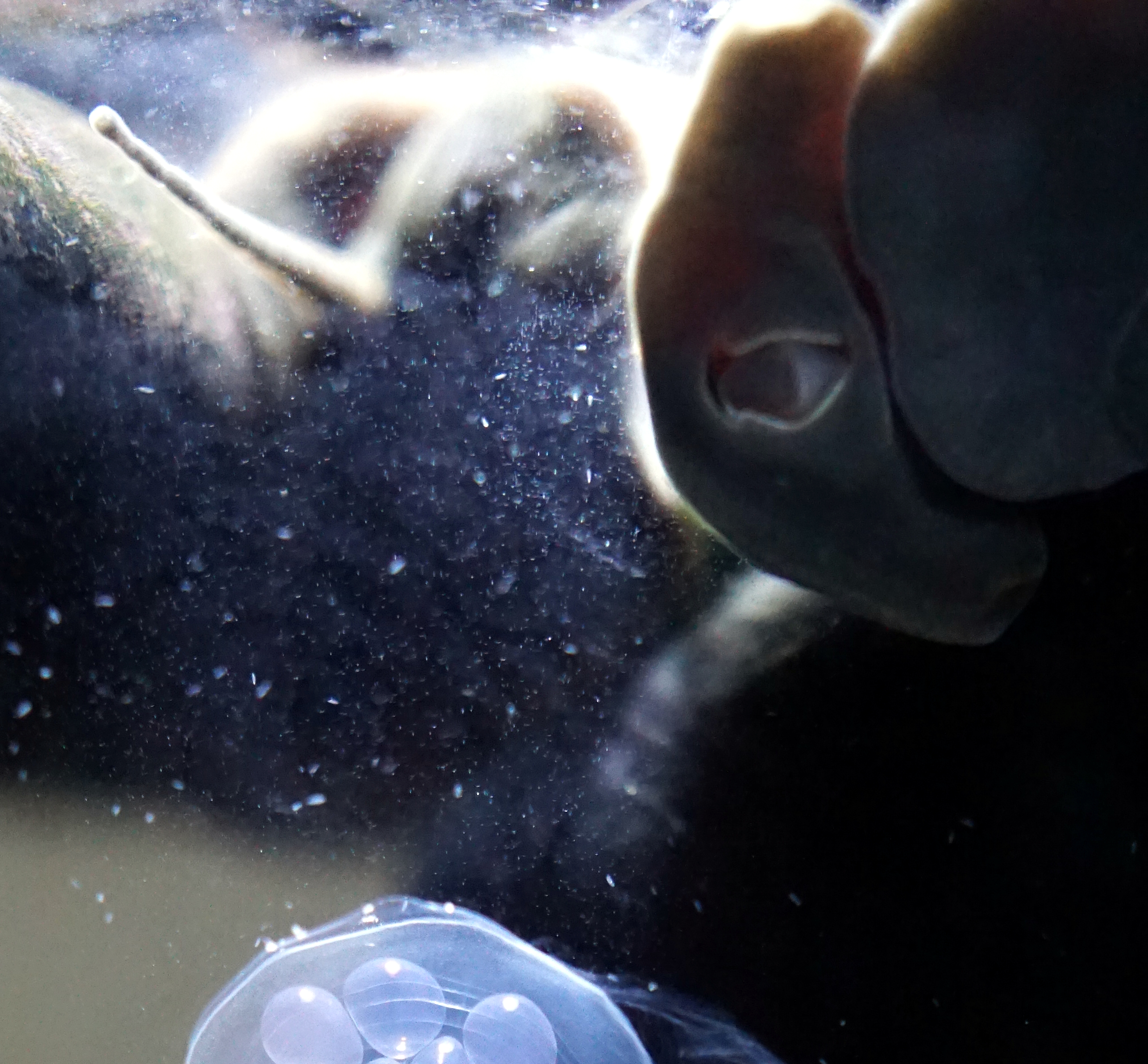
Upper right: Mouth of a Planorbarius corneus freshwater snail with the radula visible.

=== Anatomy and method of functioning ===
The mouth of the gastropods is located below the anterior part of the mollusk. It opens into a pocket-like buccal cavity, containing the radular sac, an evaginated pocket in the posterior wall of this cavity.

The radula apparatus consists of two parts :

- the cartilaginous base (the odontophore), with the odontophore protractor muscle, the radula protractor muscle and the radula retractor muscle.
- the radula itself, with its longitudinal rows of chitinous and recurved teeth, the cuticula.

The odontophore is movable and protractible, and the radula itself is movable over the odontophore. Through this action the radular teeth are being erected. The tip of the odontophore then scrapes the surface, while the teeth cut and scoop up the food and convey the particles through the esophagus to the digestive tract.

In a flexoglossate radula (the primitive condition), the teeth flex outwards to the sides as they round the tip of the odontophore, before flexing back inwards. In the derived stereoglossate condition, the teeth do not flex.

These actions continually wear down the frontal teeth. New teeth are continuously formed at the posterior end of the buccal cavity in the radular sac. They are slowly brought forward to the tip by a slow forward movement of the ribbon, to be replaced in their turn when they are worn out.

Teeth-production is rapid (some species produce up to five rows per day). The radular teeth are produced by odontoblasts, cells in the radular sac.

The number of teeth present depends on the species of mollusk and may number more than 100000. Large numbers of teeth in a row (actually v-shaped on the ribbon in many species) is presumed to be a more primitive condition, but this may not always be true.

The greatest number of teeth per row is found in Pleurotomaria (deep water gastropods in an ancient lineage) which has over 200 teeth per row (Hyman, 1967).

The shape and arrangement of the radular teeth is an adaptation to the feeding regimen of the species.

The teeth of the radula are lubricated by the mucus of the salivary gland, just above the radula. Food particles are trapped into this sticky mucus, smoothing the progress of transferring food into the esophagus.

Certain gastropods use their radular teeth to hunt other gastropods and bivalve mollusks, scraping away the soft parts for ingestion. Cone shells have a single radular tooth, that can be thrust like a harpoon into its prey, releasing a neurotoxin.

==== Seven basic types ====
Types of radula.

- The docoglossan or stereoglossan radula: in each row there is one usually small central tooth, flanked by 1–3 laterals (with the outer one dominant) and a few (3 at the most) hooked marginals. The central tooth may even be absent. The teeth are fixed in a stiff position on the radular ribbon. This is the most primitive radular type, and we could assume it represents the plesiomorphic condition i.e., the primitive character state, that is taken from an ancestor without change, such as would be possessed by the earliest mollusks (Eogastropoda, also Polyplacophora; limpet families Patellidae, Lottiidae, Lepetidae). The radula operates like a chain of 'shovels', and the rigid structure operates like a rasp, scraping at hardened macroalgae. Accordingly, docoglossan radulae are often hardened by biomineralization. Spaces between the teeth make the radula ill-suited to collecting microalgae.
  - Formula: 3 + D + 2 + R + 2 + D + 3
  - Or: 3 + D + 2 + 0 + 2 + D + 3
- Rhipidoglossan radula: a large central and symmetrical tooth, flanked on each side by several (usually five) lateral teeth and numerous closely packed flabellate marginals, called uncini (typical examples: Vetigastropoda, Neritomorpha). This already marks an improvement over the simple docoglossan state. These radulae generally operate like 'brooms', brushing up loose microalgae.
  - Formula: ∞ + 5 + R + 5 + ∞
  - In case of a dominant lateral tooth: ∞ + D + 4 + R + 4 + D + ∞

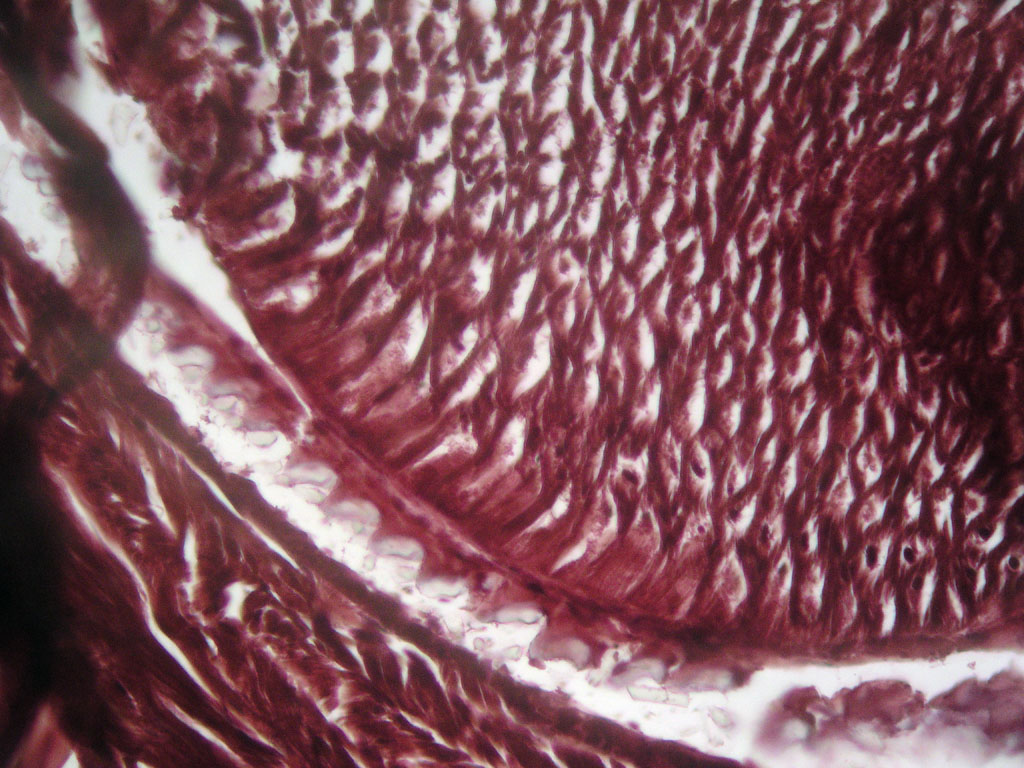
Radula (magn. 400x) of the gray garden slug (Deroceras laeve) showing the chitinous lingual ribbons with numerous inward-pointing denticles

- Hystrichoglossan radula: each row with lamellate and hooked lateral teeth and hundreds of uniform marginal teeth that are tufted at their ends (typical example : Pleurotomariidae).
  - The radular formula of, for example, Pleurotomaria (Entemnotrochus) rumphii is : ∞. 14. 27. 1. 27. 14. ∞
- Taenioglossan radula: seven teeth in each row: one middle tooth, flanked on each side by one lateral and two marginal teeth (characteristic of the majority of the Caenogastropoda). These operate like 'rakes', scraping algae and gathering the resultant detritus.
  - Formula : 2 + 1 + R + 1 + 2
- Ptenoglossan radula: rows with no central tooth but a series of several uniform, pointed marginal teeth (typical example : Epitonioidea).
  - Formula : n + 0 + n
- Stenoglossan or rachiglossan radula: each row has one central tooth and one lateral tooth on each side (or no lateral teeth in some cases) (most Neogastropoda).
  - Formula : 1 + R + 1
  - Or : 0 + R + 0
- Toxoglossan radula: The middle teeth are very small or completely absent. Each row has only two teeth of which only one is in use at a time. These grooved teeth are very long and pointed, with venom channels (neurotoxins) and barbs, and are not firmly fixed to the basal plate. The teeth can therefore be individually transferred to the proboscis and ejected like a harpoon into the prey (typical example : Conoidea).
  - formula : 1 + 0 + 1

These radular types show the evolution in the gastropods from herbivorous to carnivorous feeding patterns. Scraping algae requires many teeth, as is found in the first three types.

Carnivorous gastropods generally need fewer teeth, especially laterals and marginals. The ptenoglossan radula is situated between the two extremes and is typical for those gastropods which are adapted to a life as parasites on polyps.

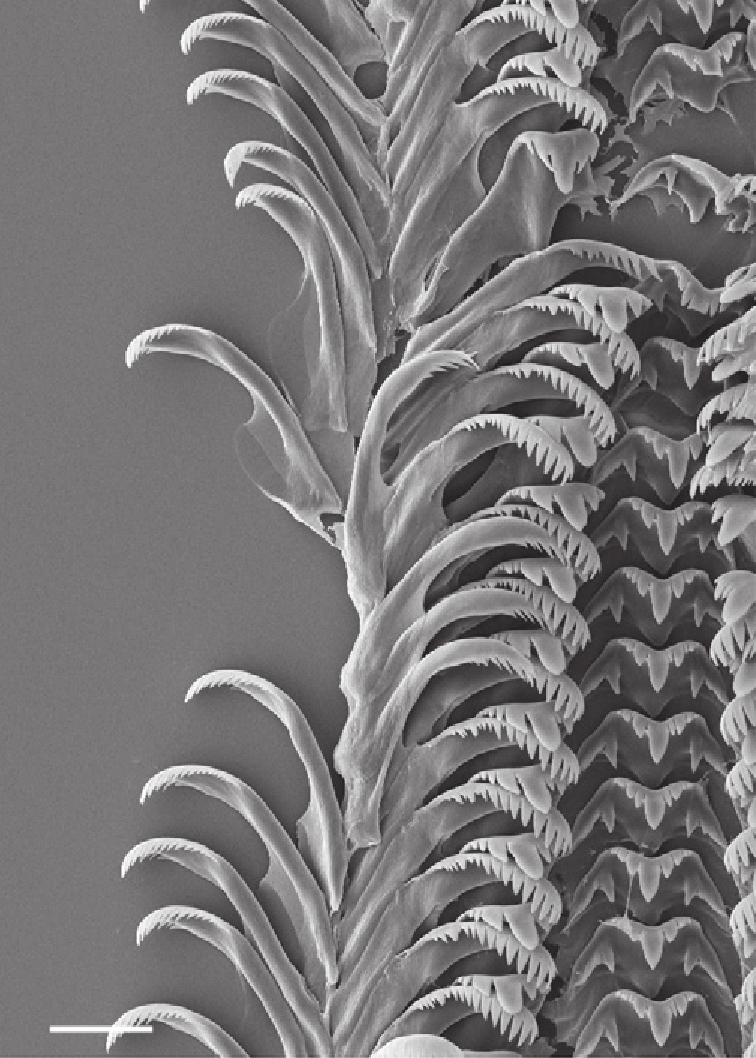
A portion of the radula of Marstonia comalensis showing outer marginal teeth (on the left), inner marginal teeth and immediately next to them lateral teeth, central teeth. Scale bar is 20 μm.

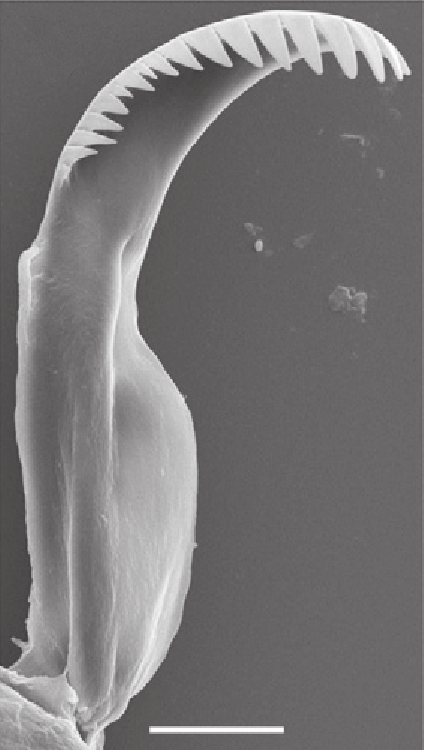
Inner marginal tooth. Scale bar is 10 μm.

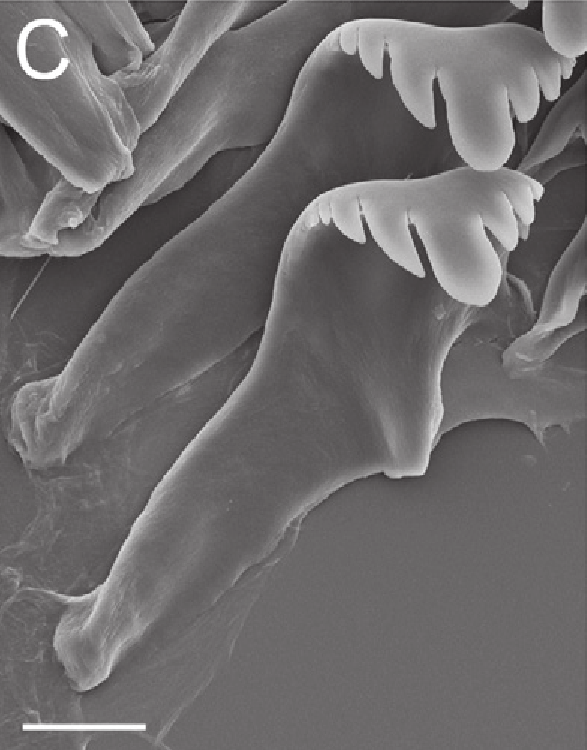
Lateral teeth. Scale bar is 10 μm.

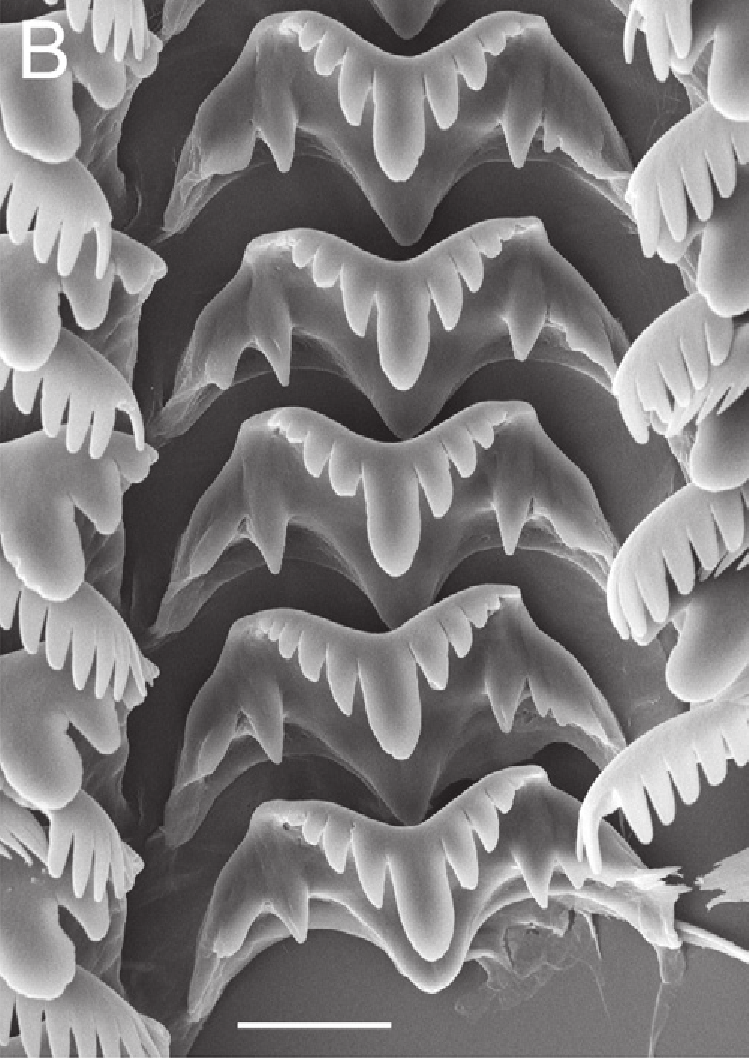
Central teeth. Scale bar is 10 μm.

=== Gastropods with no radula ===
The streptaxid Careoradula perelegans is the only known terrestrial gastropod which has no radula.

Some marine gastropods lack a radula. For example, all species of sea slugs in the family Tethydidae have no radula, and a clade of dorids (the Porostomata) as well as all species of the genus Clathromangelia (family Clathurellidae) likewise lack the organ. The radula has been lost a number of times in the Opisthobranchia.

== In cephalopods ==
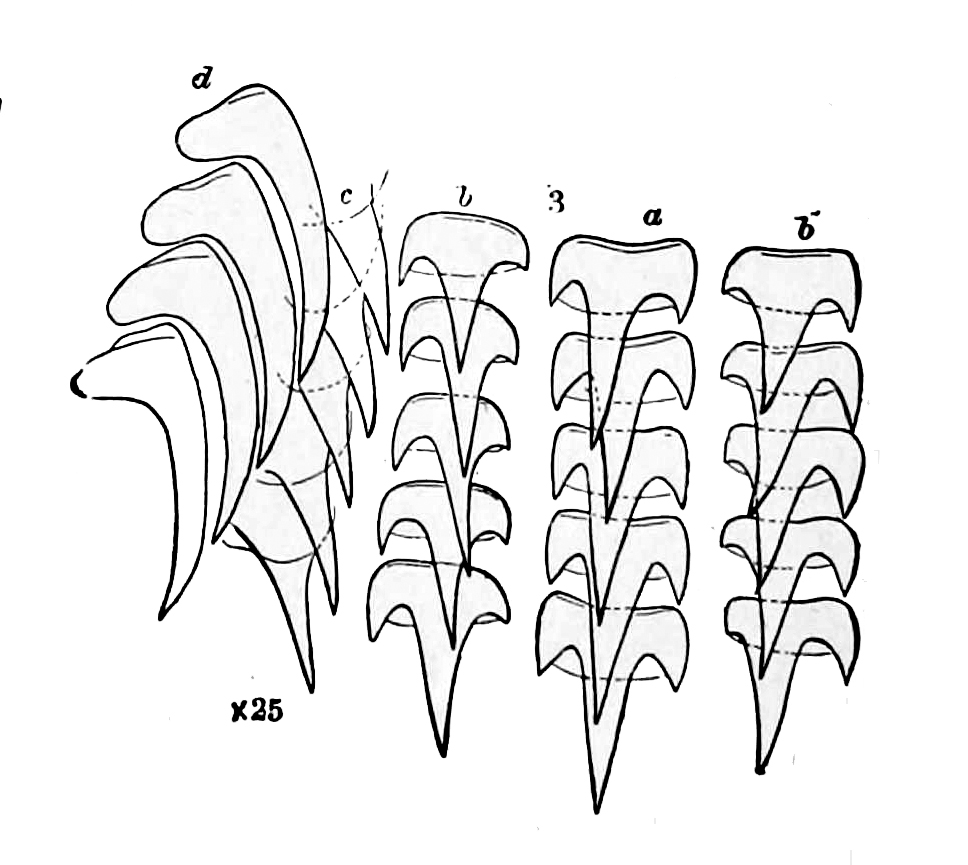
Radular teeth of the squid Illex illecebrosus

Most cephalopods possess a radula as well as a horny chitinous beak, although the radula is reduced in octopuses and absent in Spirula.

The cephalopod radula rarely fossilizes: it has been found in around one in five ammonite genera, and is rarer still in non-ammonoid forms. Indeed, it is known from only three non-ammonoid taxa in the Palaeozoic era: Michelinoceras, Paleocadmus, and an unnamed species from the Soom Shale.

== In solenogastres ==
The solenogastres radula is akin to that of other mollusks, with regularly spaced rows of teeth produced at one end and shed at the other. The teeth within each row are similar in shape, and get larger in size towards the outer extreme. A number of teeth occur on each row; this number is usually constant but prone to small variations from row to row; indeed, it increases over time, with teeth being added to the middle of rows by addition or by the division of existing teeth. A number of radular formulae are exhibited by this class: 1:0:1 is most common, followed by 0:1:0 and n:0:n.

== In caudofoveates ==
The radula of the caudofoveate Falcidens is unlike the conchiferan radula. It has a reduced form, comprising just a single row of teeth. On each side of the apparatus, two teeth appear at the front; behind these, the third teeth fuse to form a mineralized axial plate. Bars occur posterior to this, behind which a sheath encircles the apparatus. The rear of the apparatus consists of a large plate, the 'radular cone'. The unusual form of the radula is accompanied by an unusual purpose: rather than rasping substrates, Falcidens uses its teeth as pincers to grasp prey items.

== See also ==
- Hypostome
- Subradular organ
