= Mediterranea amaltheae =

Conservation status
- Critically Endangered (IUCN 3.1)

Scientific classification
- Kingdom: Animalia
- Phylum: Mollusca
- Class: Gastropoda
- Order: Stylommatophora
- Family: Oxychilidae
- Genus: Mediterranea
- Species: M. amaltheae

Binomial name
- Mediterranea amaltheae (Riedel & Subai, 1982)

Species of gastropod

Mediterranea amaltheae is a species of small air-breathing land snail, a terrestrial pulmonate gastropod mollusc in the family Oxychilidae, the glass snails.

This species is endemic to Greece and was found on Crete.
