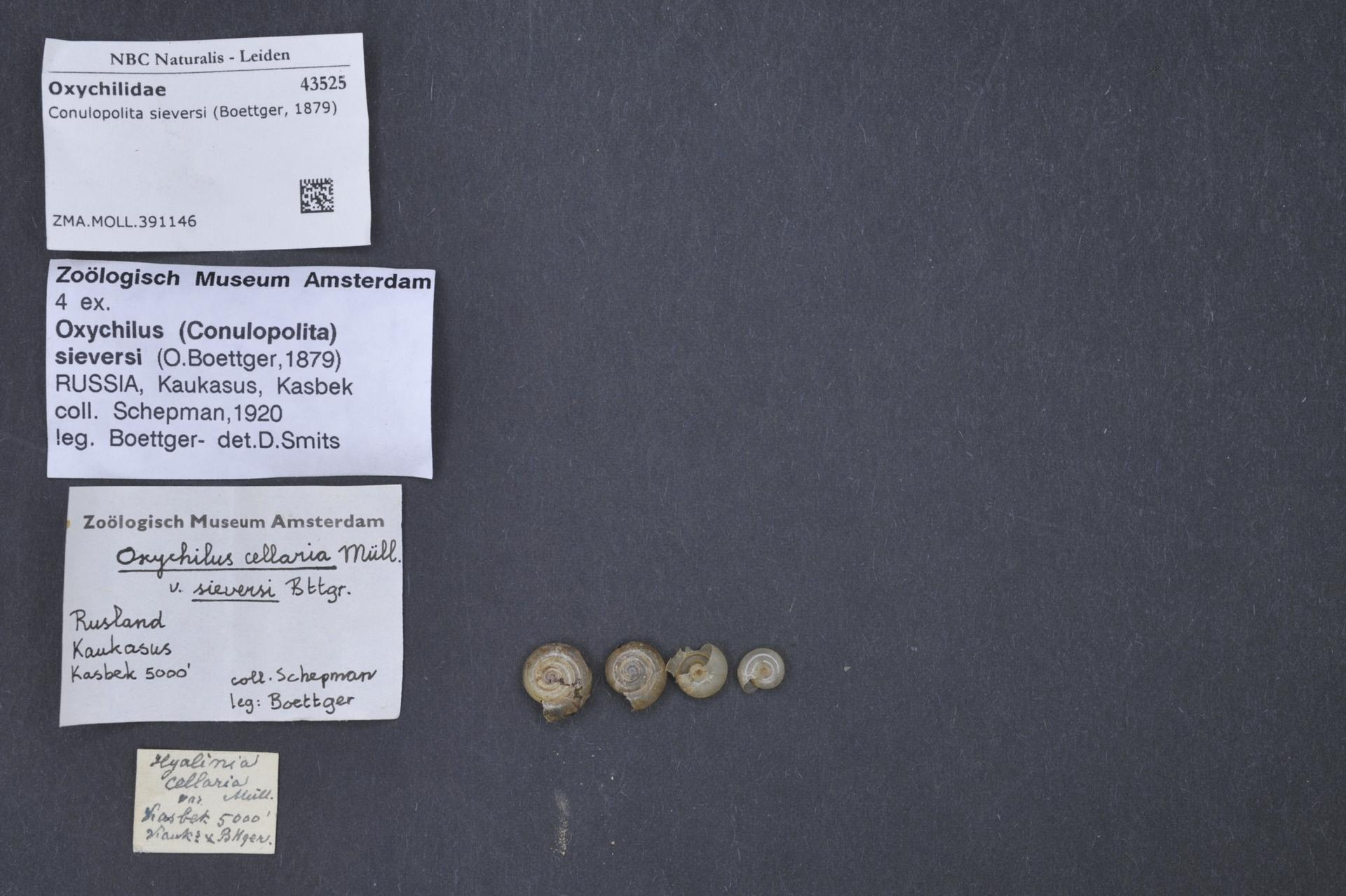
- A Conulopolita sieversi exhibit at the Zoological Museum of Amsterdam

Scientific classification
- Domain: Eukaryota
- Kingdom: Animalia
- Phylum: Mollusca
- Class: Gastropoda
- Order: Stylommatophora
- Family: Oxychilidae
- Genus: Conulopolita; Boettger, 1879

= Conulopolita =

Genus of gastropods

Conulopolita is a genus of gastropods belonging to the family Oxychilidae.

Species:

- Conulopolita birsteini (Tzvetkov, 1940)
- Conulopolita cavatica (A.Riedel, 1966)
- Conulopolita crenimargo (Retowski, 1889)
- Conulopolita impressa (A.Riedel, 1966)
- Conulopolita menkhorsti (A.Riedel, 1995)
- Conulopolita nautilus (Riedel, 1994)
- Conulopolita raddei (O.Boettger, 1879)
- Conulopolita retowskii (Lindholm, 1914)
- Conulopolita sieversi (O.Boettger, 1879)
- Conulopolita stopnevichi (Rosen, 1925)
- Conulopolita sumelensis (A.Riedel, 1989)
- Conulopolita zilchi (A.Riedel, 1984)
