= Cellariopsis =

Scientific classification
- Kingdom: Animalia
- Phylum: Mollusca
- Class: Gastropoda
- Order: Stylommatophora
- Superfamily: Gastrodontoidea
- Family: Oxychilidae
- Subfamily: Oxychilinae
- Genus: Cellariopsis; A. J. Wagner, 1914

Synonyms
- Oxychilus (Cellariopsis) A. J. Wagner, 1914; Schistophallus (Cellariopsis) A. J. Wagner, 1914

Genus of gastropods

Cellariopsis is a genus of small air-breathing land snails, terrestrial pulmonate gastropods in the subfamily Oxychilinae of the family Oxychilidae, the glass snails.

== Species ==
- Cellariopsis deubeli (A. J. Wagner, 1914)
