= Cellariopsis deubeli =

Scientific classification
- Kingdom: Animalia
- Phylum: Mollusca
- Class: Gastropoda
- Order: Stylommatophora
- Family: Oxychilidae
- Genus: Cellariopsis
- Species: C. deubeli

Binomial name
- Cellariopsis deubeli (A. J. Wagner, 1914)

Synonyms
- Oxychilus orientalis (Clessin, 1887); Schistophallus (Cellariopsis) deubeli A. J. Wagner, 1914 (original combination)

Species of gastropod

Cellariopsis deubeli is a species of air-breathing land snail, a terrestrial pulmonate gastropod mollusk in the family Oxychilidae.

== Distribution ==
This species occurs in Slovakia.
