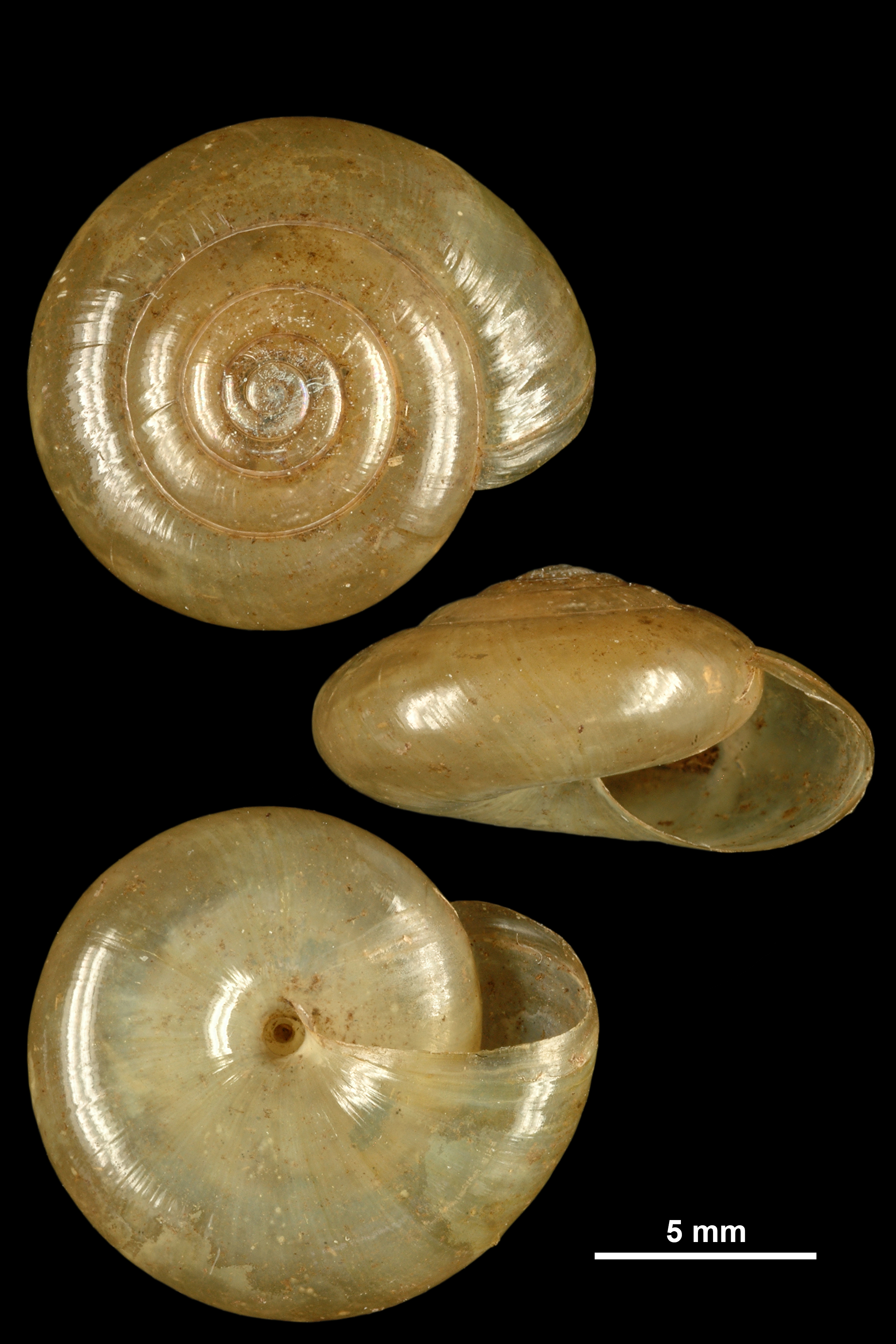
- Shell of Morlina glabra (specimen at MNHN, Paris)

Scientific classification
- Kingdom: Animalia
- Phylum: Mollusca
- Class: Gastropoda
- Order: Stylommatophora
- Infraorder: Limacoidei
- Superfamily: Gastrodontoidea
- Family: Oxychilidae
- Genus: Morlina; A. J. Wagner, 1914

Synonyms
- Gemma Hazay, 1885; Hyalinia (Morlina) A. J. Wagner, 1914; Oxychilus (Morlina) A. J. Wagner, 1914 (unaccepted rank)

= Morlina =

Genus of gastropods

Morlina is a genus of small air-breathing land snails, terrestrial pulmonate gastropods in the family Oxychilidae, the glass snails.

== Species ==
- Morlina glabra (Rossmässler, 1835)
- Morlina urbanskii (A. Riedel, 1963)
