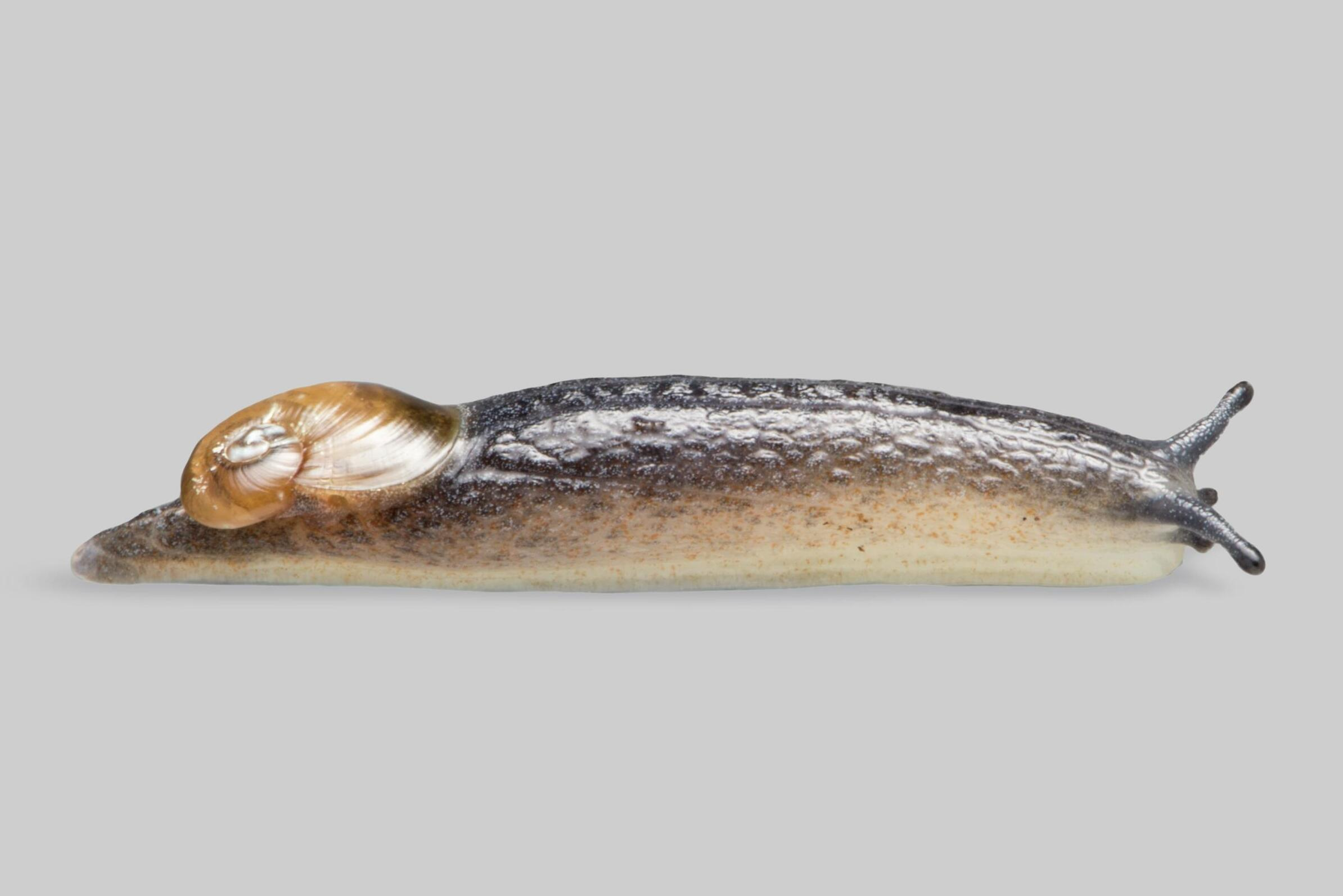

Conservation status
- Least Concern (IUCN 3.1)

Scientific classification
- Kingdom: Animalia
- Phylum: Mollusca
- Class: Gastropoda
- Order: Stylommatophora
- Family: Oxychilidae
- Genus: Daudebardia
- Species: D. rufa

Binomial name
- Daudebardia rufa (Draparnaud, 1805)

= Daudebardia rufa =

Species of gastropod

Daudebardia rufa is a species of air-breathing land snail or semi-slug, a terrestrial pulmonate gastropod mollusk in the family Oxychilidae, which belongs to the limacoid clade.

Daudebardia rufa is the type species of the genus Daudebardia. This species is a predatory carnivore.

== Description ==
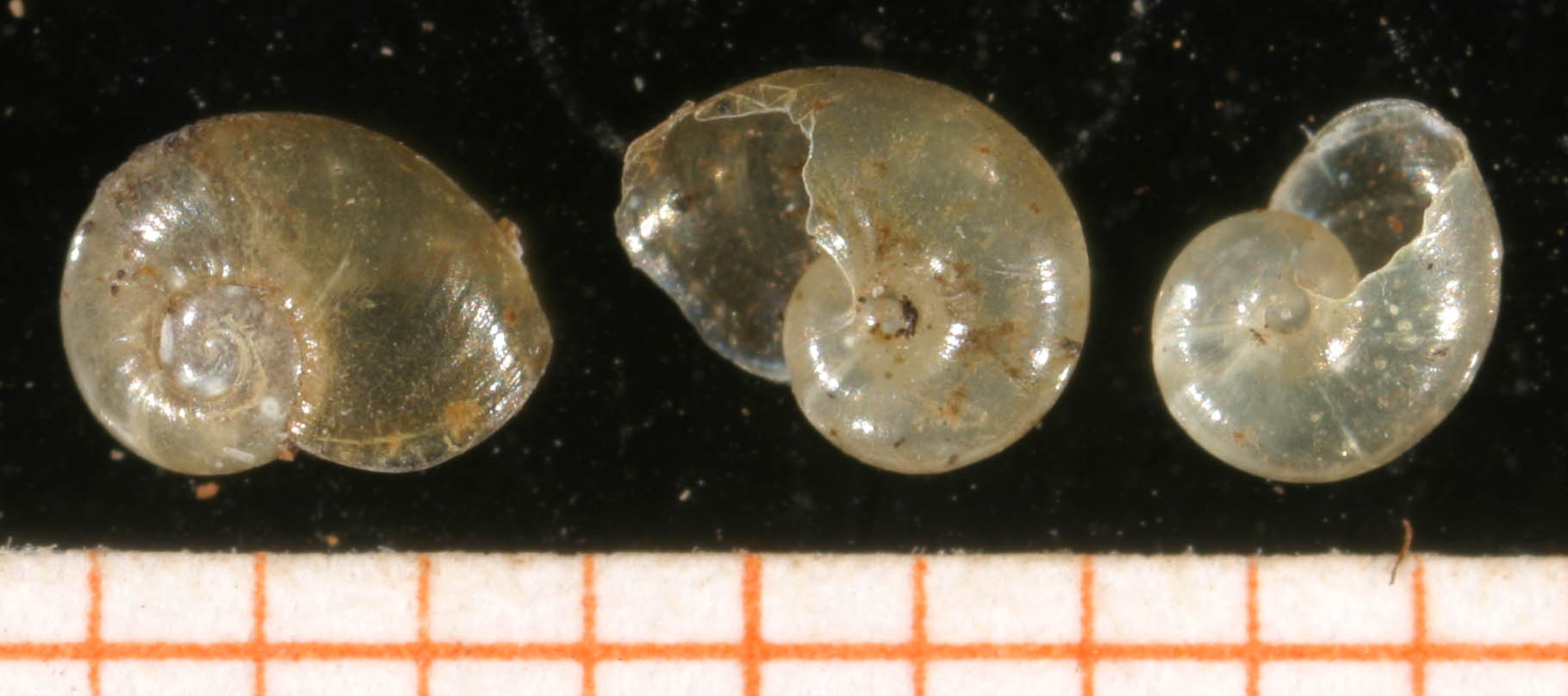
Three shells

The length of the body 16–20 mm (0.63–0.79 in). The color of the skin is blue-grey.

The shell is perforate, depressed, transversely dilated, with fine striations and very glossy surface, and corneous or rufous in colour. The spire is moderate and sublateral. The shell has three whorls. The last whorl in adults is elongated and is not angulated. The aperture is large and has a rounded oval shape. The length of the shell is 5.5 mm (0.22 in).

== Distribution ==
The distribution of this species is in central and southern Europe including Bulgaria, Czech Republic, Slovakia, and Ukraine.
