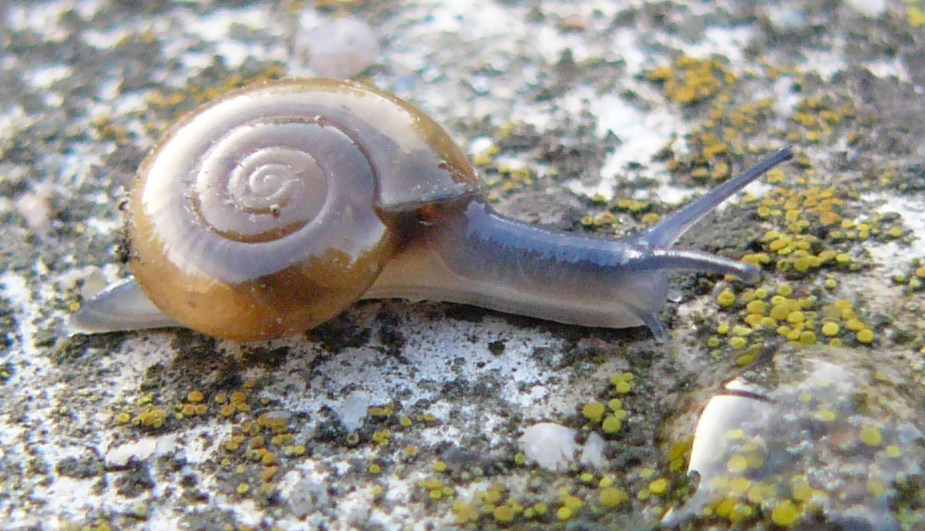

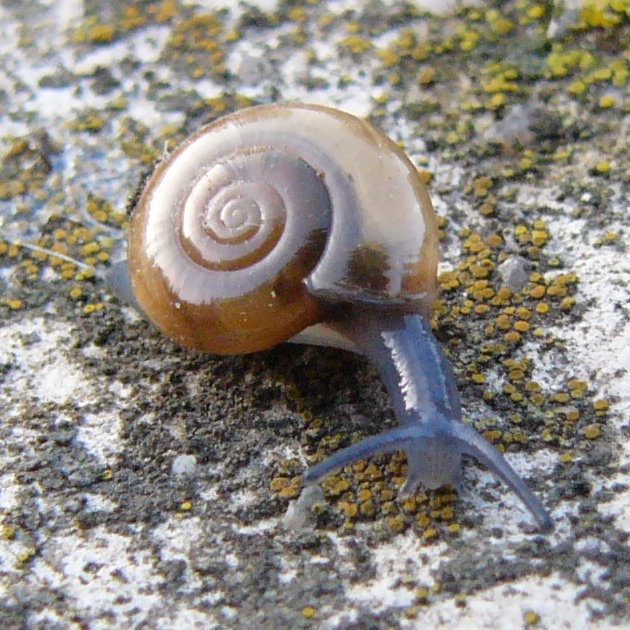

Conservation status
- Least Concern (IUCN 3.1)

- Secure (NatureServe)

Scientific classification
- Kingdom: Animalia
- Phylum: Mollusca
- Class: Gastropoda
- Order: Stylommatophora
- Family: Oxychilidae
- Genus: Oxychilus
- Species: O. draparnaudi

Binomial name
- Oxychilus draparnaudi (Beck, 1837)

= Oxychilus draparnaudi =

Species of gastropod

Oxychilus draparnaudi, or Draparnaud's glass snail, is a species of small land snail, a terrestrial pulmonate gastropod mollusc in the family Oxychilidae, the glass snails.

== Description ==
Oxychilus draparnaudi is large for a glass snail, also called the dark-bodied glass snail with a shell of about 14 mm (0.55 in) in maximum dimension. The shell is glossy and is a translucent yellowish-brown and gold in color, somewhat whiter underneath.

The visible soft parts of the animal are a very unusual strong dark blue, mixed with grey.

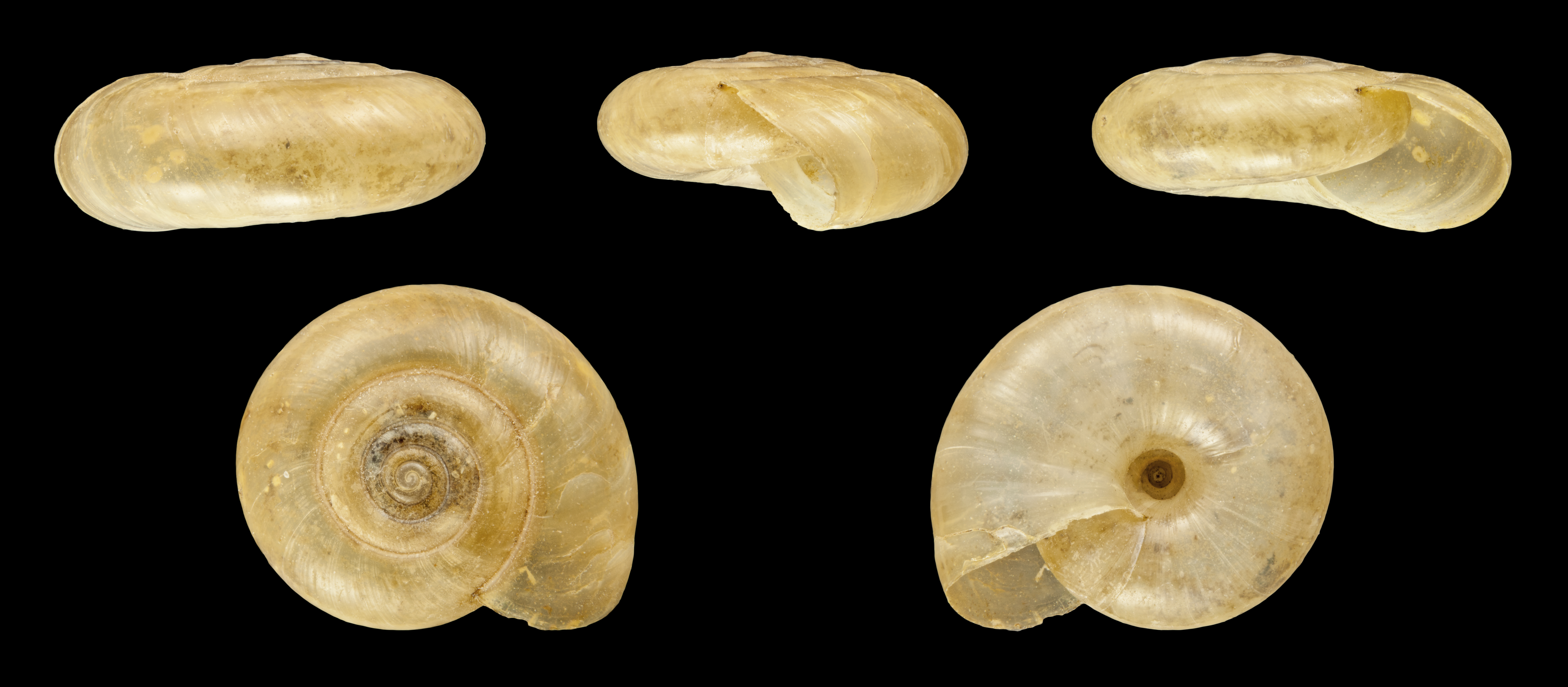
Shell of an Adult specimen (Ø 1.3 cm, 0.51 in)

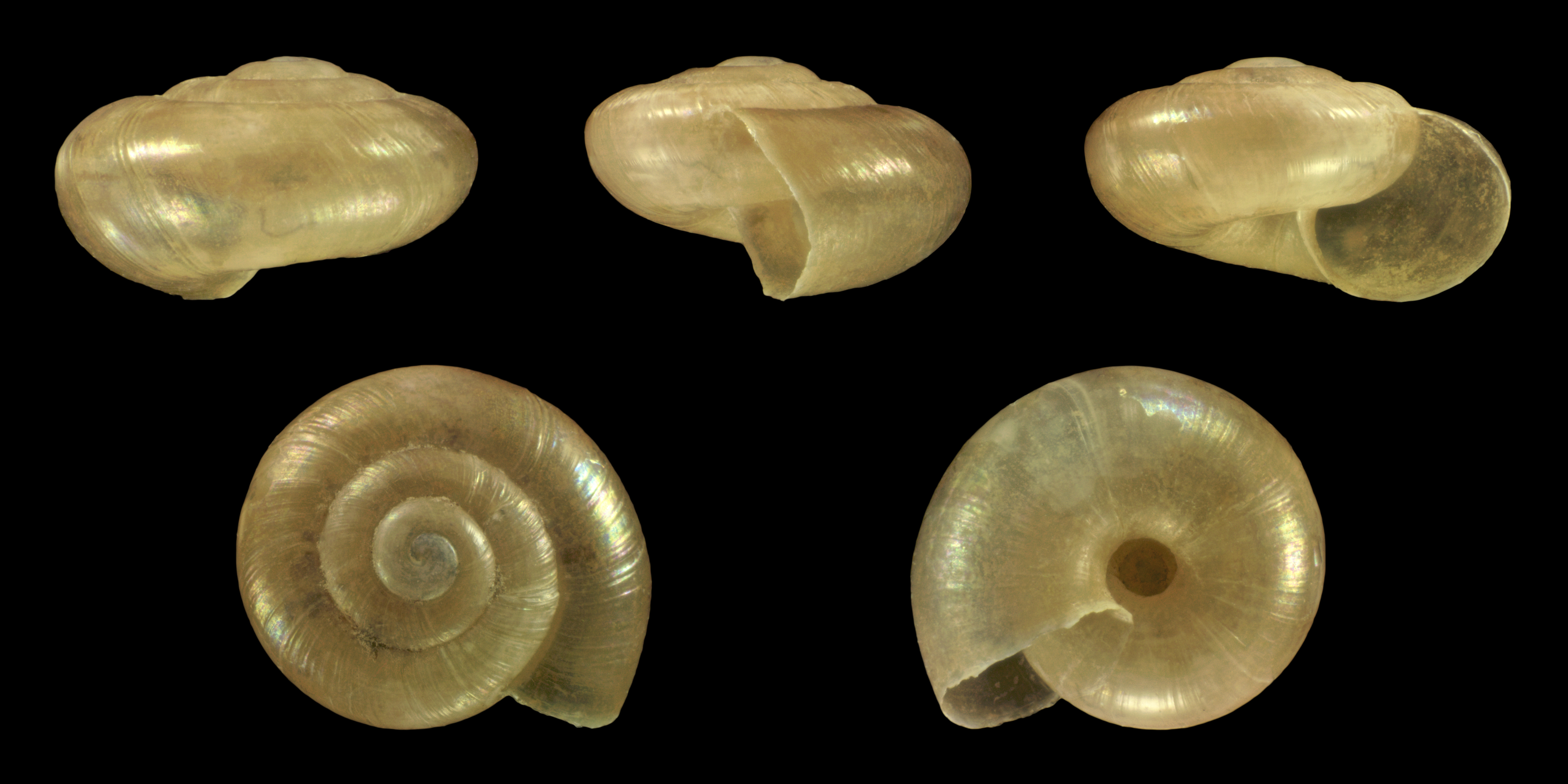
Shell of a Juvenile specimen (Ø 4 mm, 0.16 in)

== Distribution ==
This species occurs in countries and islands including:

- Czech Republic
- Slovakia
- Ukraine
- Great Britain
- Ireland
- Malaysia
- Singapore
- Hawaii
- Bulgaria
- Canada

and other areas

== Synonyms ==
Synonyms include Oxychilus drapanaldi, Oxychilus lucidum, Helix lucida, Helix nitida, Helicella draparnaldi, and Polita draparnaldi.
