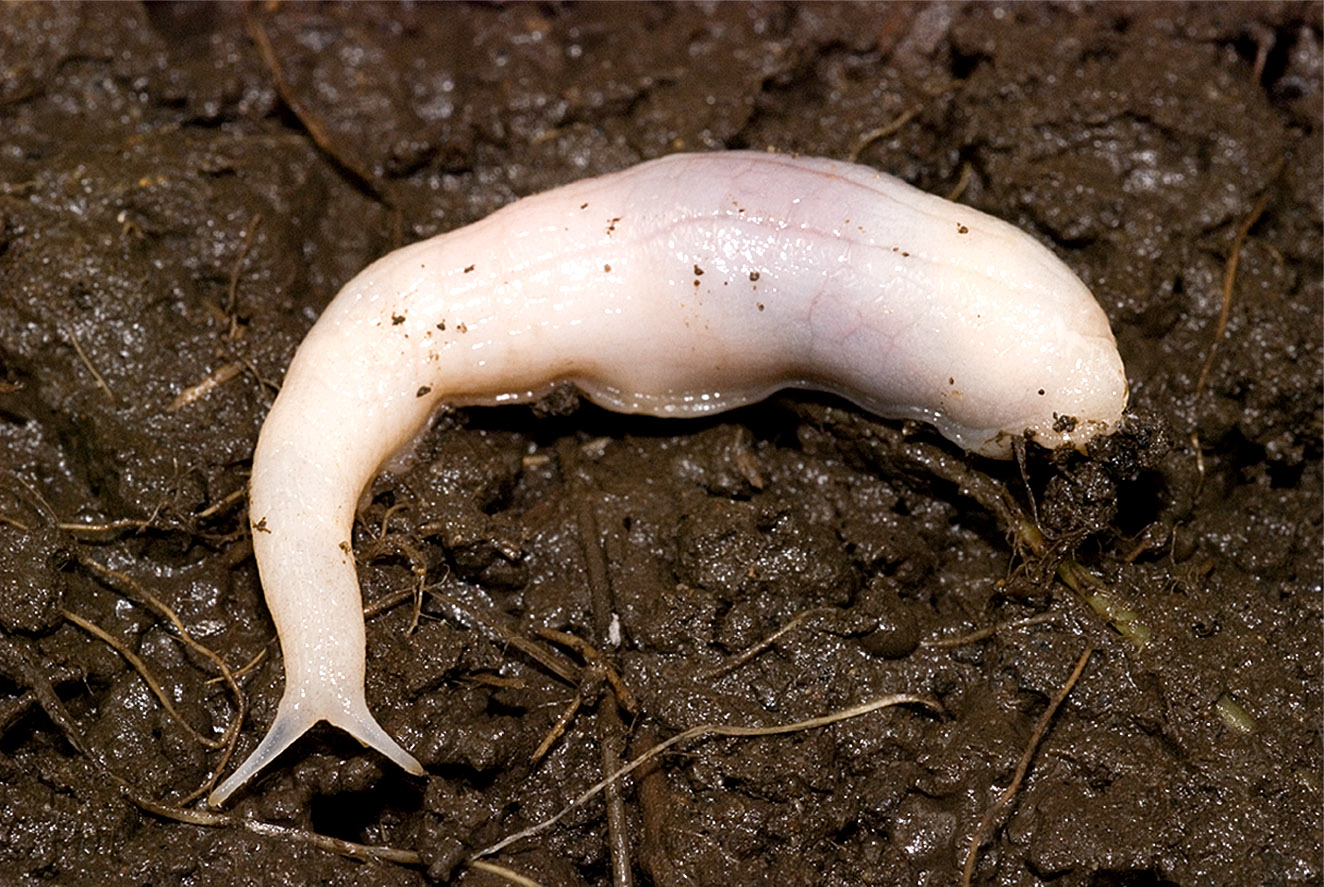
- A live individual of Selenochlamys ysbryda, head end towards the lower left

Scientific classification
- Kingdom: Animalia
- Phylum: Mollusca
- Class: Gastropoda
- Order: Stylommatophora
- Family: Oxychilidae
- Genus: Selenochlamys; Boettger, 1883

Type species
- Selenochlamys pallida Boettger, 1883

= Selenochlamys =

Genus of gastropod

Selenochlamys is a genus of predatory air-breathing land slugs, shell-less pulmonate gastropod molluscs. When described it was supposed to be in the family Trigonochlamydidae, but DNA evidence has shown it to be in the Oxychilidae instead.

== Species ==
Species within the genus Selenochlamys include:

- Selenochlamys pallida Boettger, 1883 - the type species
- Selenochlamys ysbryda Rowson & Symondson, 2008
