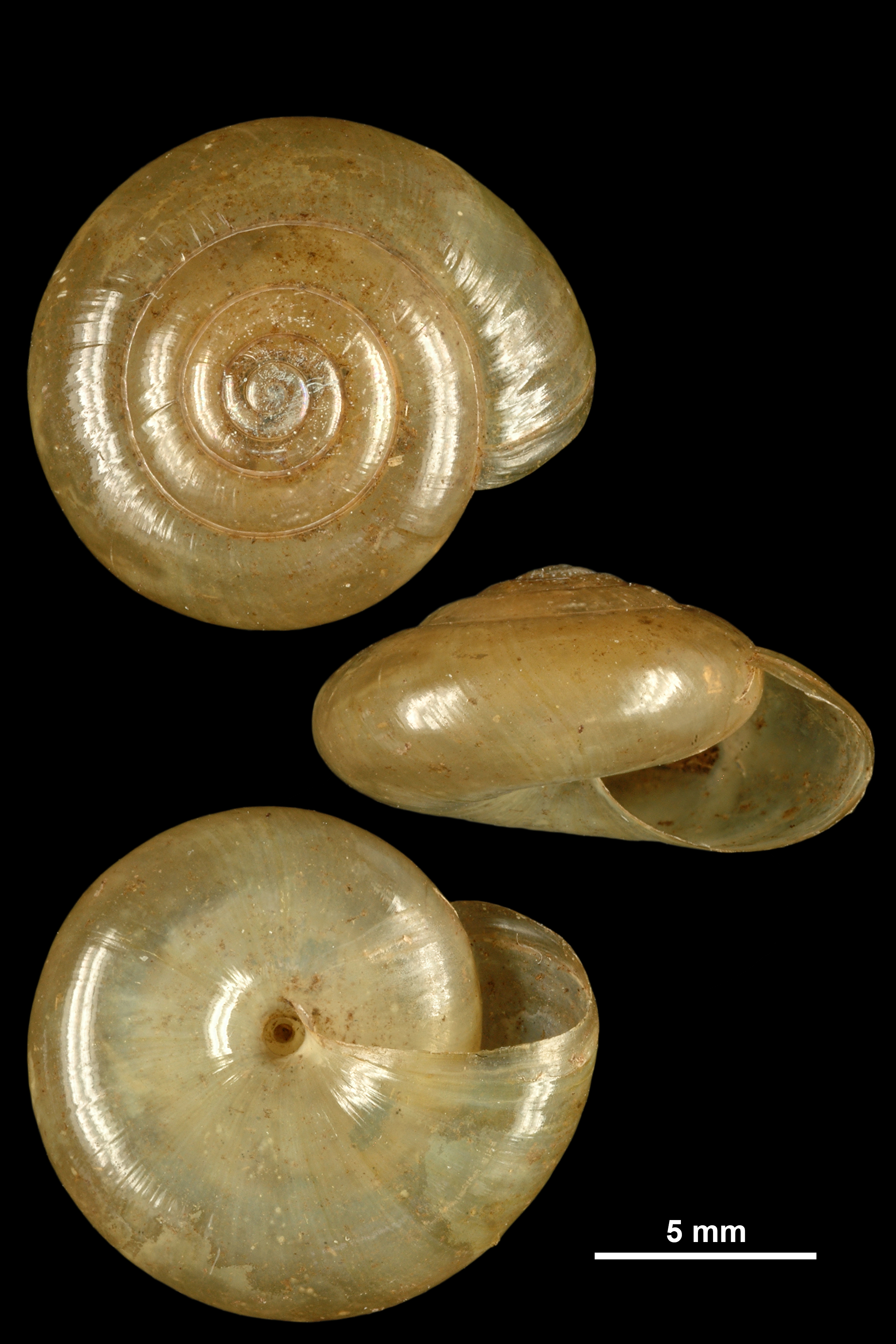

Scientific classification
- Kingdom: Animalia
- Phylum: Mollusca
- Class: Gastropoda
- Order: Stylommatophora
- Family: Oxychilidae
- Genus: Morlina
- Species: M. glabra

Binomial name
- Morlina glabra (Rossmässler, 1835)

Synonyms
- Helix glabra Rossmässler, 1835 (original combination); Oxychilus (Morlina) glaber (Rossmässler, 1835); Zonites glaber (Rossmässler, 1835) (unaccepted combination)

= Morlina glabra =

Species of gastropod

Morlina glabra is a species of gastropods belonging to the family Oxychilidae.

Subspecies:

- Morlina glabra ercica (Benoit, 1859)
- Morlina glabra glabra (Rossmässler, 1835)
- Morlina glabra harlei (Fagot, 1884)
- Morlina glabra nitidissima (Mousson, 1859)
- Morlina glabra striaria (Westerlund, 1881)

== Distribution ==
This species occurs in:

- The Czech Republic
- Ukraine
