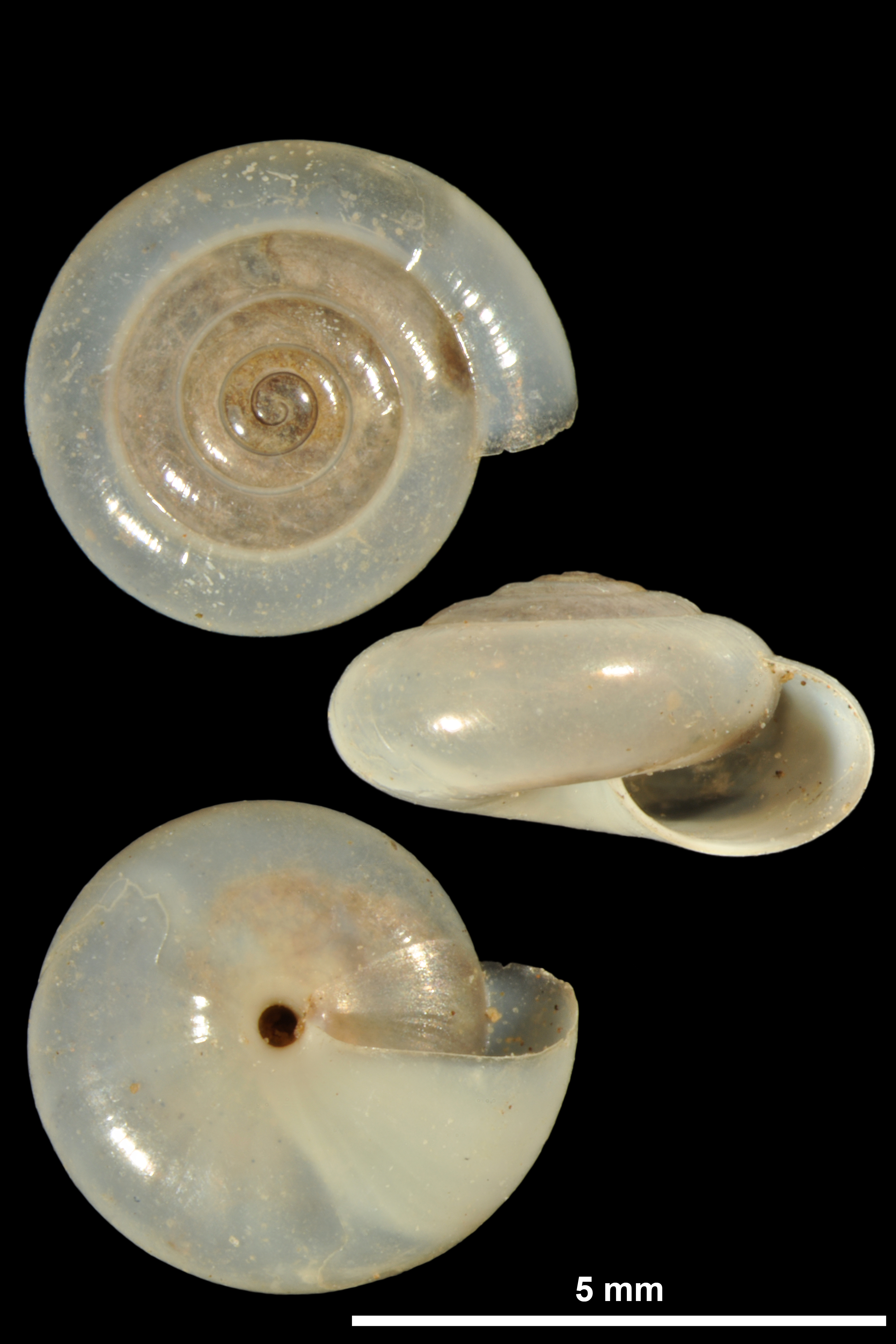
- Shell of Mediterranea hydatina hydatina (specimen at MNHN, Paris)

Scientific classification
- Kingdom: Animalia
- Phylum: Mollusca
- Class: Gastropoda
- Order: Stylommatophora
- Superfamily: Gastrodontoidea
- Family: Oxychilidae
- Subfamily: Oxychilinae
- Genus: Mediterranea; Clessin, 1880

Synonyms
- Diaphanella P. Hesse, 1916; Geodiaphana Thiele, 1917; Hydatina Westerlund, 1886; Oxychilus (Riedelius) Hudec, 1961; Riedeliconcha Schileyko, 2003; Riedelius Hudec, 1961

= Mediterranea (gastropod) =

Genus of gastropods

Mediterranea is a genus of small air-breathing land snails, terrestrial pulmonate gastropods in the family Oxychilidae, the glass snails.

== Species ==
- Mediterranea adamii (Westerlund, 1886)
- Mediterranea aliatahani (A. Riedel, 1984)
- Mediterranea amaltheae (A. Riedel & Subai, 1982)
- Mediterranea depressa (Sterki, 1880)
- Mediterranea hydatina (Rossmässler, 1838)
- Mediterranea inopinata (Uličný, 1887)
- Mediterranea ionica (A. Riedel & Subai, 1978)
- Mediterranea juliae (A. Riedel, 1990)
- Mediterranea montivaga (M. Kimakowicz, 1890)
- Mediterranea planorbis (Möllendorff, 1899)
- Mediterranea planospiroides (A. Riedel, 1969)
- Mediterranea polygyra (Pollonera, 1885)
- Mediterranea pygmaea (A. Riedel, 1983)
- Mediterranea samsunensis (Retowski, 1889)
- Mediterranea serbica (A. Riedel, 1969)
- Mediterranea wiktori (A. Riedel, 1997)
- Mediterranea xylocola Örstan, 2020

Uncertain species

- Mediterranea mariensis E. Gittenberger, 2008
- Mediterranea mylonasi (A. Riedel, 1983)
- Mediterranea pieperi (A. Riedel, 1973)
