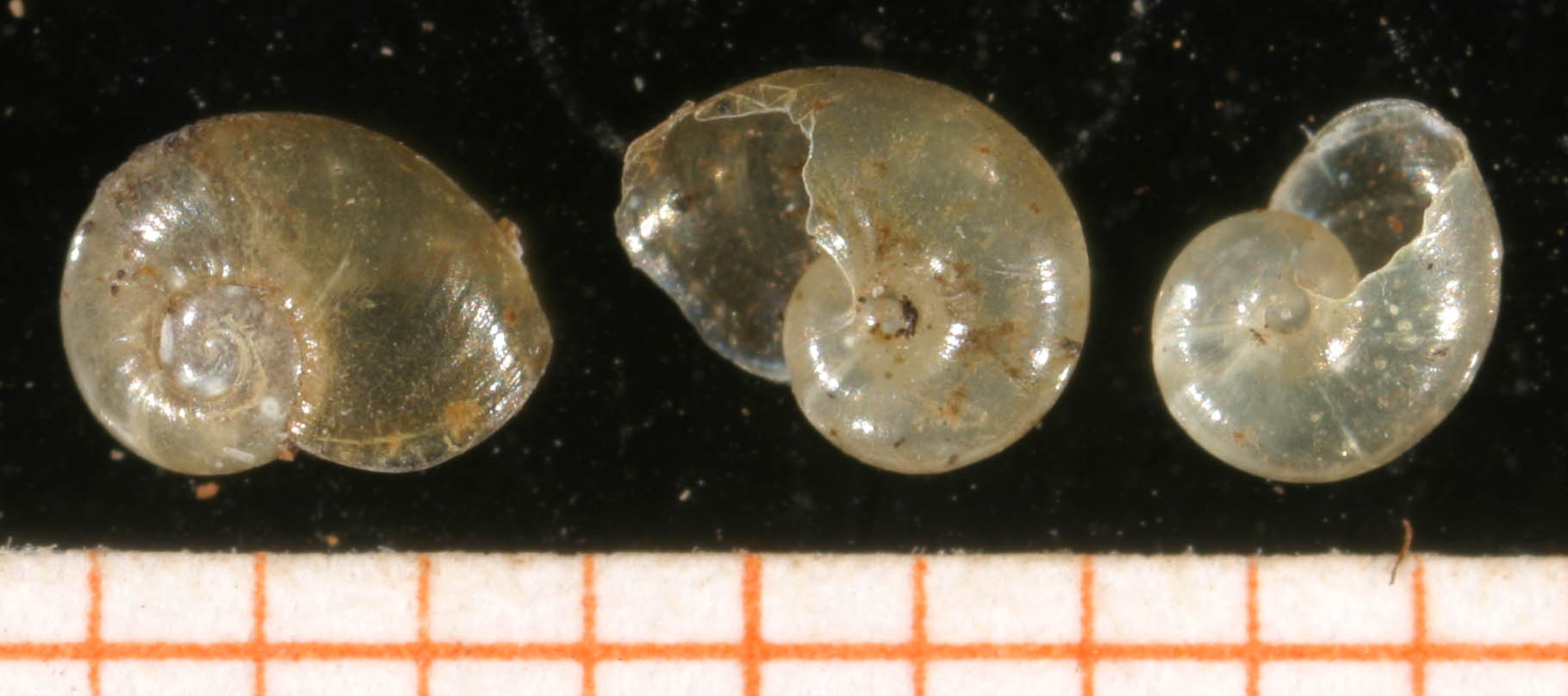
- Daudebardia rufa

Scientific classification
- Kingdom: Animalia
- Phylum: Mollusca
- Class: Gastropoda
- Order: Stylommatophora
- Family: Oxychilidae
- Subfamily: Daudebardiinae
- Genus: Daudebardia; Hartmann, 1821

= Daudebardia =

Genus of gastropods

Daudebardia are small air-breathing land snails or semi-slugs, terrestrial pulmonate gastropods in the family Oxychilidae, the glass snails.

== Species ==
Species within the genus Daudebardia include:

  - Daudebardia brevipes (Draparnaud, 1805)
  - Daudebardia rufa (Draparnaud, 1805)
- subgenus Libania
  - Daudebardia saulcyi (Bourguignat, 1852)
