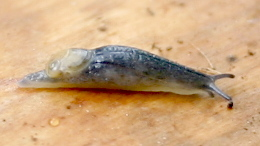
- A live individual of the semi-slug species Daudebardia rufa

Scientific classification
- Kingdom: Animalia
- Phylum: Mollusca
- Class: Gastropoda
- Order: Stylommatophora
- Superfamily: Gastrodontoidea
- Family: Oxychilidae; Hesse in Geyer, 1927 (1879)

Subfamilies
- Daudebardiinae; Godwiniinae; Nastiinae; Oxychilinae

Synonyms
- Daudebardiidae

= Oxychilidae =

Family of gastropods

Oxychilidae is a taxonomic family of air-breathing land snails, terrestrial pulmonate gastropod mollusks in the superfamily Gastrodontoidea.

== Distribution ==
The distribution of Oxychilidae includes the Nearctic, western-Palearctic, eastern-Palearctic, Neotropical, Ethiopia and Hawaii.

== Taxonomy ==
The following three subfamilies were recognized in the taxonomy of Bouchet & Rocroi (2005):

- Subfamily Oxychilinae Hesse, 1927 (1879) - synonyms: Helicellinae H. Adams & A. Adams, 1855 (inv.); Hyalininae Clessin, 1876 (inv.); Hyaliniinae Strebel & Pfeffer, 1879; Nastiinae A. Riedel, 1989
- Subfamily Daudebardiinae Kobelt, 1906
- Subfamily Godwiniinae Cooke, 1921
- Subfamily Nastiinae A. Riedel, 1989

== Genera ==
Genera within the Oxychilidae include:

Subfamily Oxychilinae

- Allogenes Gude, 1911
- Araboxychilus A. Riedel, 1977
- Cellariopsis A.J.Wagner, 1914
- Conulopolita O. Boettger, 1879
- Discoxychilus A. Riedel, 1966
- Eopolita Pollonera, 1916
- Gastranodon O. Boettger, 1889
- Iranoxychilus A. Riedel, 1998
- Mediterranea Clessin, 1880 - sometimes as a subgenus of Oxychilus
- Morlina A. J. Wagner 1914 - sometimes as a subgenus of Oxychilus
- Oxychilus Fitzinger, 1833
  - subgenus Oxychilus Fitzinger 1833
  - subgenus Riedelius Hudec 1961
- Pseudopolita Germain, 1908
- Vitrinoxychilus A. Riedel, 1963

Subfamily Daudebardiinae

- Carpathica A. J. Wagner, 1895
- Daudebardia Hartmann, 1821 - type genus of the subfamily Daudebardiinae

Subfamily Nastiinae

- Nastia Riedel, 1989
- Schistophallus A. J. Wagner, 1914

Subfamily incertae sedis

- Selenochlamys Boettger, 1883

== Cladogram ==
The following cladogram shows the phylogenic relationships of this family to the other families within the limacoid clade:

- limacoid clade
  - Staffordioidea
    Staffordiidae
  - - - Dyakioidea
        Dyakiidae
      - Gastrodontoidea
        - Pristilomatidae
        - - Chronidae
          - - Euconulidae
            - Trochomorphidae
          - - Gastrodontidae
            - Oxychilidae
    - - Parmacelloidea
        - Trigonochlamydidae
        - Parmacellidae
        - Milacidae
      - - - Zonitoidea
            Zonitidae
          - Helicarionoidea
            - Helicarionidae
            - - Ariophantidae
              - Urocyclidae
        - Limacoidea
          - Vitrinidae
          - - Boettgerillidae
            - - Limacidae
              - Agriolimacidae
