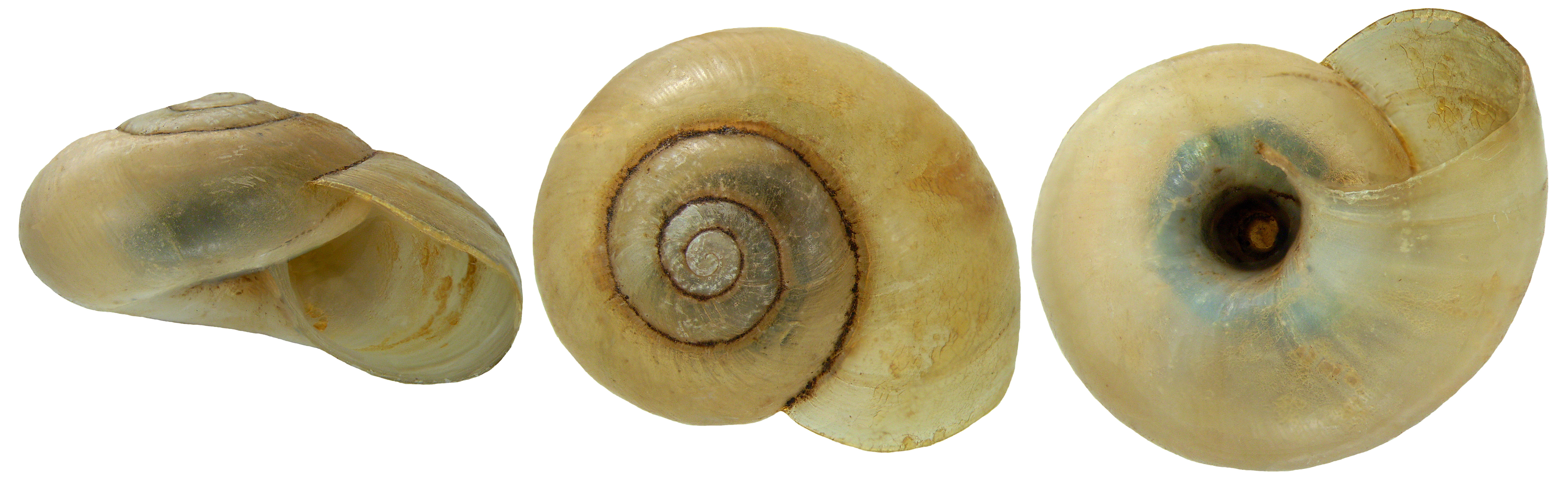
- Retinella hiulca size 10 to 14mm

Scientific classification
- Kingdom: Animalia
- Phylum: Mollusca
- Class: Gastropoda
- Order: Stylommatophora
- Infraorder: Limacoidei
- Superfamily: Gastrodontoidea
- Family: Gastrodontidae
- Genus: Retinella; P. Fischer, 1877

Type species
- Helix olivetorum Gmelin, 1791

Synonyms
- Aegopina Kobelt, 1879; Hyalina (Retinella) P. Fischer, 1877 (unaccepted rank); Oxychilus (Retinella) P. Fischer, 1877; Retinella (Lyrodiscus) Pilsbry, 1893 · alternate representation; Retinella (Retinella) P. Fischer, 1877 · alternate representation; Retinella (Retinelloides) A. Riedel, 1977 · alternate representation

= Retinella =

Genus of gastropods

Retinella is a genus of air-breathing land snails, terrestrial pulmonate gastropod mollusks in the family Gastrodontidae.

== Species ==
Species within the genus Retinella include:

- Retinella actinophora (Dall, 1900)
- † Retinella applanata Kókay, 2006
- Retinella circumsessa (Shuttleworth, 1852)
- † Retinella depressissima (Sacco, 1884)
- † Retinella elephantium (Bourguignat, 1869)
- † Retinella forcarti Schlickum & Strauch, 1979
- Retinella giustii A. Riedel, 1998
- Retinella hierroensis M. R. Alonso & Ibáñez, 2013
- Retinella hiulca (Albers, 1850)
- Retinella incerta (Draparnaud, 1805)
- Retinella lenis (Shuttleworth, 1852)
- Retinella olivetorum (Gmelin, 1791)
- Retinella osoriensis (Wollaston, 1878)
- Retinella radiatella (Reinhardt, 1877)
- Retinella rochebruni (J. Mabille, 1882)
- Retinella (Retinelloides) stabilei (Pollonera, 1886) (uncertain)

Synonyms

- Retinella chathamensis (Dall, 1893): synonym of Glyphyalus chathamensis (Dall, 1893) (unaccepted combination)
- Retinella cypria (L. Pfeiffer, 1847): synonym of Schistophallus cyprius (L. Pfeiffer, 1847): synonym of Oxychilus cyprius (L. Pfeiffer, 1847) (unaccepted combination)
- Retinella graziadei Boeckel, 1940: synonym of Aegopinella graziadei (Boeckel, 1940) (original combination)
- Retinella insecta (E. von Martens, 1877): synonym of Glyphyalinia insecta (E. von Martens, 1877) (unaccepted combination)
- Retinella kobelti Lindholm, 1910: synonym of Schistophallus kobelti (Lindholm, 1910) (original combination)
- Retinella mavromoustakisi F. Haas, 1934: synonym of Oxychilus mavromoustakisi (F. Haas, 1934) (original combination)
- Retinella radiatula (Alder, 1830): synonym of Perpolita hammonis (Strøm, 1765) (junior synonym)
- Retinella subhyalina (L. Pfeiffer, 1867): synonym of Nesovitrea subhyalina (L. Pfeiffer, 1867) (unaccepted combination)
- Retinella zikmundi Branson, 1964: synonym of Glyphyalinia wheatleyi (Bland, 1883)
