= Zonitoides lateumbilicatus =

Conservation status
- Vulnerable (NatureServe)

Scientific classification
- Kingdom: Animalia
- Phylum: Mollusca
- Class: Gastropoda
- Order: Stylommatophora
- Superfamily: Gastrodontoidea
- Family: Gastrodontidae
- Genus: Zonitoides
- Species: Z. lateumbilicatus

Binomial name
- Zonitoides lateumbilicatus (Pilsbry, 1895)

Synonyms
- Gastrodonta (Pseudohyalina) lateumbilicata Pilsbry, 1895 (original combination)

Species of gastropod

Zonitoides lateumbilicatus is a species of small, air-breathing land snail, a terrestrial pulmonate gastropod mollusk in the family Gastrodontidae.

== Description ==
The altitude of the shell attains 1.4 mm (0.06 in), its diameter 4.3 mm (0.17 in).

(Original description) The shell resembles Pseudohyalina limatula (synonym of Zonitoides limatulus (A. Binney, 1840) ) in color, texture and sculpture, but it is much depressed. The upper surface is almost flat, the last whorl has a much smaller calibre, the umbilicus is very much wider, shallow. And its cavity is widely open and saucer-shaped, much as in Helicodiscus lineatus (Say, 1817) (synonym of Helicodiscus parallelus (Say, 1821)).

== Distribution ==
This calcifile species is found in eastern Kentucky and northeastern Alabama, USA.
