= Zonitoides cretaceus =

Scientific classification
- Kingdom: Animalia
- Phylum: Mollusca
- Class: Gastropoda
- Order: Stylommatophora
- Superfamily: Gastrodontoidea
- Family: Gastrodontidae
- Genus: Zonitoides
- Species: †Z. cretaceus

Binomial name
- †Zonitoides cretaceus Yen, 1969

Species of gastropod

Zonitoides cretaceus is an extinct species of small, air-breathing land snail, a terrestrial pulmonate gastropod mollusk in the family Gastrodontidae.

== Distribution ==
This species was originally found in Shantung, China
