= Zonitoides wenzi =

Scientific classification
- Domain: Eukaryota
- Kingdom: Animalia
- Phylum: Mollusca
- Class: Gastropoda
- Order: Stylommatophora
- Superfamily: Gastrodontoidea
- Family: Gastrodontidae
- Genus: Zonitoides
- Species: †Z. wenzi

Binomial name
- †Zonitoides wenzi (Royo Gómez, 1928)

Synonyms
- † Patula wenzi Royo Gómez, 1928 superseded combination

Species of gastropod

Zonitoides wenzi is an extinct species of small, air-breathing land snail, a terrestrial pulmonate gastropod mollusk in the family Gastrodontidae.

== Distribution ==
Fossils of this species were originally found in Spain.
