= Zonitoides kirbyi =

Conservation status
- Imperiled (NatureServe)

Scientific classification
- Kingdom: Animalia
- Phylum: Mollusca
- Class: Gastropoda
- Order: Stylommatophora
- Superfamily: Gastrodontoidea
- Family: Gastrodontidae
- Genus: Zonitoides
- Species: Z. kirbyi

Binomial name
- Zonitoides kirbyi R. W. Fullington, 1974

Species of gastropod

Zonitoides kirbyi is a species of small, air-breathing land snail, a terrestrial pulmonate gastropod mollusk in the family Gastrodontidae.

== Description ==
The altitude of the shell attains 3.4 mm (0.13 in), its diameter 6.3 mm (0.25 in).

== Distribution ==
This species was originally found in Schulze Cave approximately 28 miles northeast of Rocksprings, Edwards County, Texas, USA. Since then it has also been found above the soil surface (epigeal), about the mouth of caves or under logs.
