= Zonitoides schaireri =

Scientific classification
- Kingdom: Animalia
- Phylum: Mollusca
- Class: Gastropoda
- Order: Stylommatophora
- Superfamily: Gastrodontoidea
- Family: Gastrodontidae
- Genus: Zonitoides
- Species: †Z. schaireri

Binomial name
- †Zonitoides schaireri Schlickum, 1978

Synonyms
- † Zonitoides (Zonitoides) schaireri Schlickum, 1978 alternate representation

Species of gastropod

Zonitoides schaireri is an extinct species of small, air-breathing land snail, a terrestrial pulmonate gastropod mollusk in the family Gastrodontidae.

== Distribution ==
Fossils of this species were originally found in Pannonian strata in the Vienna Basin, Austria.

== Bibliography ==
- Schlickum, W.R. (1978). Zur oberpannonen Molluskenfauna von Öcs, I. Archiv für Molluskenkunde. 108 (4-6), 245-261
- Harzhauser, M., Binder, H. (2004). Synopsis of the Late Miocene mollusc fauna of the classical sections Richardhof and Eichkogel in the Vienna Basin (Austria, Pannonian, MN 9-MN11). Archiv für Molluskenkunde. 133 (1-2), 1-57.
