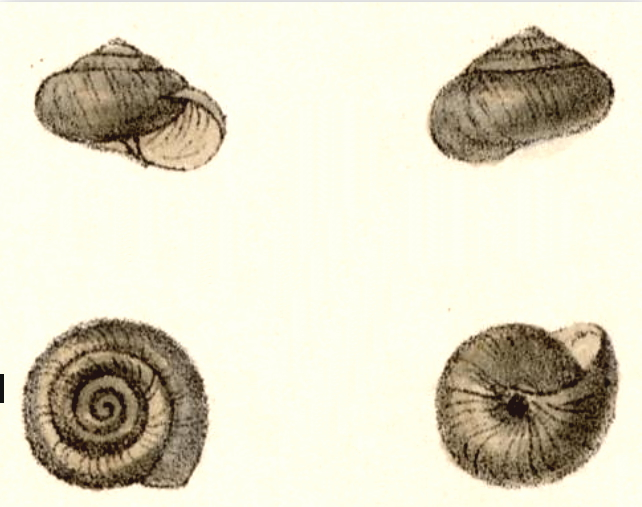
- Shell of Zonitoides glomerulus (holotype)

Scientific classification
- Kingdom: Animalia
- Phylum: Mollusca
- Class: Gastropoda
- Order: Stylommatophora
- Superfamily: Gastrodontoidea
- Family: Gastrodontidae
- Genus: Zonitoides
- Species: Z. glomerulus

Binomial name
- Zonitoides glomerulus (E. von Martens, 1892)

Synonyms
- Hyalinia glomerula E. von Martens, 1892; Zonitoides (Zonitellus) glomerulus (E. von Martens, 1892); Zonitoides (Zonitoides) glomerulus (E. von Martens, 1892) · alternate representation

= Zonitoides glomerulus =

Species of gastropod

Zonitoides glomerulus is a European species of small, air-breathing land snail, a terrestrial pulmonate gastropod mollusk in the family Gastrodontidae.

== Description ==
The diameter of the shell varies between 4.3 and 5 mm (0.17 and 0.20 in), its altitude is 2 mm (0.079 in).

(Original description in Latin) The shell has a narrow umbilicus. It is globular subdepressed. It is shiny, white and transparent. The shell contains four convex whorls. There are no spiral striae. The suture is deep. The body whorl is subequally convex above and below, slightly bent anteriorly. The aperture is slightly oblique, lunate-subcircular, with the edges removed to insert into each other. The wide columella is arched.

== Distribution ==
This species occurs in Guatemala.
