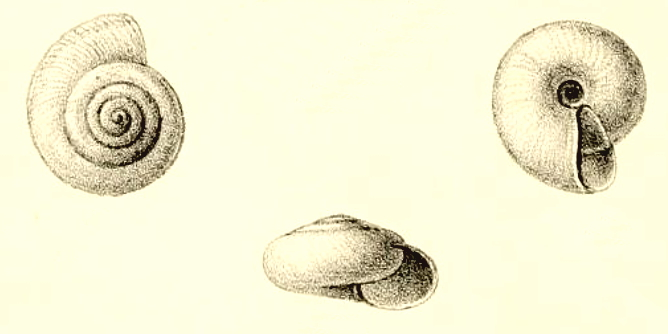
- Shell of Zonitoides notabilis (holotype)

Scientific classification
- Kingdom: Animalia
- Phylum: Mollusca
- Class: Gastropoda
- Order: Stylommatophora
- Superfamily: Gastrodontoidea
- Family: Gastrodontidae
- Genus: Zonitoides
- Species: Z. notabilis

Binomial name
- Zonitoides notabilis (Sykes, 1897)

Synonyms
- Polita notabilis Sykes, 1897

= Zonitoides notabilis =

Species of gastropod

Zonitoides notabilis is a species of small, air-breathing land snail, a terrestrial pulmonate gastropod mollusk in the family Gastrodontidae.

== Distribution ==
This species occurs in Sri Lanka
