= Zonitoides tehuantepecensis =

Scientific classification
- Kingdom: Animalia
- Phylum: Mollusca
- Class: Gastropoda
- Order: Stylommatophora
- Superfamily: Gastrodontoidea
- Family: Gastrodontidae
- Genus: Zonitoides
- Species: Z. tehuantepecensis

Binomial name
- Zonitoides tehuantepecensis (Crosse & P. Fischer, 1870)

Synonyms
- Zonites tehuantepecensis Crosse & P. Fischer, 1870 (original combination); Zonitoides (Zonitellus) tehuantepecensis (Crosse & P. Fischer, 1870); Zonitoides (Zonitoides) tehuantepecensis (Crosse & P. Fischer, 1870) · alternate representation

Species of gastropod

Zonitoides tehuantepecensis is a species of small, air-breathing land snail, a terrestrial pulmonate gastropod mollusk in the family Gastrodontidae.

== Distribution ==
This species occurs Guatemala and on the coast of the state of Oaxaca (Mexico).
