= Zonitoides jaccetanicus =

Conservation status
- Data Deficient (IUCN 3.1)

Scientific classification
- Kingdom: Animalia
- Phylum: Mollusca
- Class: Gastropoda
- Order: Stylommatophora
- Family: Gastrodontidae
- Genus: Zonitoides
- Species: Z. jaccetanicus

Binomial name
- Zonitoides jaccetanicus (Bourguignat, 1870)

Synonyms
- Zonites jaccetanicus Bourguignat, 1870 (original combination); Zonitoides (Zonitoides) jaccetanicus (Bourguignat, 1870) · alternate representation

Species of gastropod

Zonitoides jaccetanicus is a species of small, air-breathing land snail, a terrestrial pulmonate gastropod mollusk in the family Gastrodontidae.

== Distribution ==
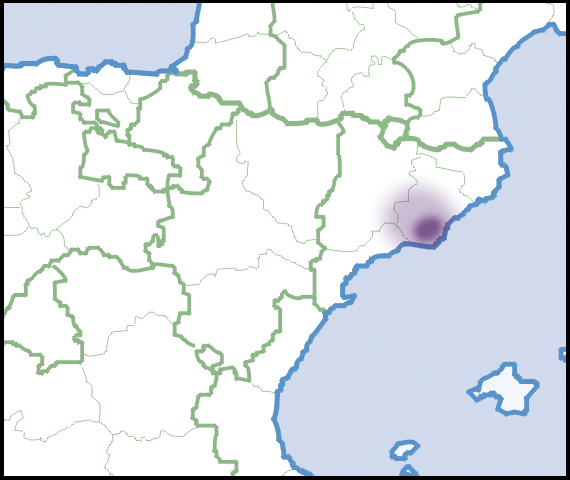
Distribution

Zonitoides jaccetanicus is endemic to Montserrat mountain near Barcelona, Catalonia, Spain. It is a rare species, possibly endemic to Catalonia. The species has declined due to construction activities in the growing city of Barcelona.

== Description ==
The shell is evenly horny-brownish, fragile and transparent, finely striated on the upper side, and early smooth on the lower side. The shell has 5 weakly convex whorls with pronounced suture. The upper side is flattened. The lower side is convex. The last whorl is not much wider than the penultimate whorl. The aperture is oblique. The apertural margin is straight. The umbilicus is relatively narrow.

The width of the shell is 4–5 mm (0.16–0.20 in). The height of the shell is 2.6–3.4 mm (0.10–0.13 in).

The shell is very much like that of Zonitoides arboreus, but slightly larger. There are however anatomical differences between the two species.
