= Zonitoides apneus =

Scientific classification
- Kingdom: Animalia
- Phylum: Mollusca
- Class: Gastropoda
- Order: Stylommatophora
- Superfamily: Gastrodontoidea
- Family: Gastrodontidae
- Genus: Zonitoides
- Species: †Z. apneus

Binomial name
- †Zonitoides apneus (Bourguignat, 1881)

Synonyms
- † Zonites apneus Bourguignat, 1881 superseded combination

Species of gastropod

Zonitoides apneus is an extinct species of small, air-breathing land snail, a terrestrial pulmonate gastropod mollusk in the family Gastrodontidae.

== Distribution ==
This species was originally found in France.
