= Zonitoides subradiatulus =

Scientific classification
- Kingdom: Animalia
- Phylum: Mollusca
- Class: Gastropoda
- Order: Stylommatophora
- Superfamily: Gastrodontoidea
- Family: Gastrodontidae
- Genus: Zonitoides
- Species: †Z. subradiatulus

Binomial name
- †Zonitoides subradiatulus (Łomnicki, 1886)

Synonyms
- † Hyalina (Polita) subradiatula Łomnicki, 1886 superseded combination

Species of gastropod

Zonitoides subradiatulus is an extinct species of small, air-breathing land snail, a terrestrial pulmonate gastropod mollusk in the family Gastrodontidae.

== Distribution ==
Fossils of this species were originally found in Ukraine.
