= Zonitoides nitidopsis =

Scientific classification
- Kingdom: Animalia
- Phylum: Mollusca
- Class: Gastropoda
- Order: Stylommatophora
- Superfamily: Gastrodontoidea
- Family: Gastrodontidae
- Genus: Zonitoides
- Species: Z. nitidopsis

Binomial name
- Zonitoides nitidopsis (Morelet, 1851)

Synonyms
- Helix nitidopsis Morelet, 1851; Zonitoides (Zonitellus) nitidopsis (Morelet, 1851); Zonitoides (Zonitoides) nitidopsis (Morelet, 1851) · alternate representation

Species of gastropod

Zonitoides nitidopsis is a species of small, air-breathing land snail, a terrestrial pulmonate gastropod mollusk in the family Gastrodontidae.

== Description ==
The altitude of the shell attains 4 mm (0.16 in), its diameter 7 mm (0.28 in).

(Original text in Latin) The thin, amber shell is perforated, convex-depressed, glabrous, brown, ribbed and marked with small striae. It contains four barely convex whorls. The last whorl is concave. The aperture is lunate-circular. The peristome is acute and thin.
