= Zonitoides choukoutienensis =

Scientific classification
- Domain: Eukaryota
- Kingdom: Animalia
- Phylum: Mollusca
- Class: Gastropoda
- Order: Stylommatophora
- Superfamily: Gastrodontoidea
- Family: Gastrodontidae
- Genus: Zonitoides
- Species: †Z. choukoutienensis

Binomial name
- †Zonitoides choukoutienensis (Ping, 1929)

Synonyms
- † Helix choukoutienensis Ping, 1929 superseded combination

Species of gastropod

Zonitoides choukoutienensis is an extinct species of small, air-breathing land snail, a terrestrial pulmonate gastropod mollusk in the family Gastrodontidae.

== Distribution ==
This species was originally found in Heibei, China
