= Zonitoides cesseyensis =

Scientific classification
- Domain: Eukaryota
- Kingdom: Animalia
- Phylum: Mollusca
- Class: Gastropoda
- Order: Stylommatophora
- Superfamily: Gastrodontoidea
- Family: Gastrodontidae
- Genus: Zonitoides
- Species: †Z. cesseyensis

Binomial name
- †Zonitoides cesseyensis Schlickum, 1975

Synonyms
- † Zonitoides (Zonitoides) cesseyensis Schlickum, 1975 alternate representation

Species of gastropod

Zonitoides cesseyensis is an extinct species of small, air-breathing land snail, a terrestrial pulmonate gastropod mollusk in the family Gastrodontidae.

== Distribution ==
This species was originally found in France.
