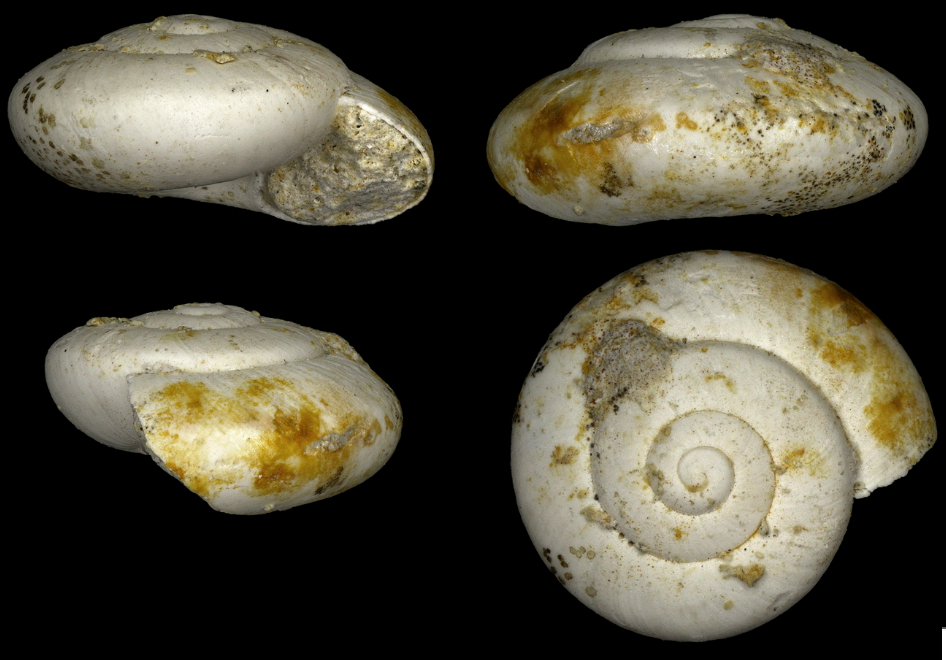
- Shell of Zonitoides pellati (specimen at MNHN, Paris)

Scientific classification
- Kingdom: Animalia
- Phylum: Mollusca
- Class: Gastropoda
- Order: Stylommatophora
- Superfamily: Gastrodontoidea
- Family: Gastrodontidae
- Genus: Zonitoides
- Species: †Z. pellati

Binomial name
- †Zonitoides pellati (Deshayes, 1863)

Synonyms
- † Helix pellati Deshayes, 1863 superseded combination

= Zonitoides pellati =

Species of gastropod

Zonitoides pellati is an extinct species of small, air-breathing land snail, a terrestrial pulmonate gastropod mollusk in the family Gastrodontidae.

== Distribution ==
This species was originally found in Eocene strata about Épernay, France.
