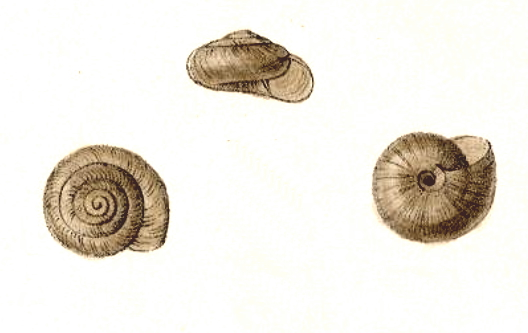
- Shell of Zonitoides hoffmanni (holotype)

Scientific classification
- Kingdom: Animalia
- Phylum: Mollusca
- Class: Gastropoda
- Order: Stylommatophora
- Superfamily: Gastrodontoidea
- Family: Gastrodontidae
- Genus: Zonitoides
- Species: Z. hoffmanni

Binomial name
- Zonitoides hoffmanni (E. von Martens, 1892)

Synonyms
- Hyalinia hoffmanni E. von Martens, 1892; Vitrea (Oxychilus) hoffmanni (E. von Martens, 1892); Zonitoides (Zonitellus) hoffmanni (E. von Martens, 1892); Zonitoides (Zonitoides) hoffmanni (E. von Martens, 1892) · alternate representation

= Zonitoides hoffmanni =

Species of gastropod

Zonitoides hoffmanni is a European species of small, air-breathing land snail, a terrestrial pulmonate gastropod mollusk in the family Gastrodontidae.

== Description ==
The diameter of the shell varies between 5.3 and 6 mm (0.21 and 0.24 in), its altitude is 2.5 mm (0.098 in).

(Original description in Latin) The shell has a broad umbilicus. It is conoid-depressed and is striated. It is smooth with a pale greenish color. The shell contains 4½ convex whorls. The suture is deep enough. The body whorl is rounded, not bent anteriorly, excavated below, gradually reaching almost to the umbilicus. The aperture is slightly oblique, emarginate-subcircular, with removed edges. The columella is distinctly ascending.

== Distribution ==
This species occurs in Costa Rica.
