= Zonitoides suevicus =

Scientific classification
- Kingdom: Animalia
- Phylum: Mollusca
- Class: Gastropoda
- Order: Stylommatophora
- Superfamily: Gastrodontoidea
- Family: Gastrodontidae
- Genus: Zonitoides
- Species: †Z. suevicus

Binomial name
- †Zonitoides suevicus (Jooss, 1918)

Synonyms
- † Hyalinia (Polita) suevica Jooss, 1918 superseded combination

Species of gastropod

Zonitoides suevicus is an extinct species of small, air-breathing land snail, a terrestrial pulmonate gastropod mollusk in the family Gastrodontidae.

== Distribution ==
Fossils of this species were originally found in Germany.
