= Zonitoides patuloides =

Conservation status
- Vulnerable (NatureServe)

Scientific classification
- Kingdom: Animalia
- Phylum: Mollusca
- Class: Gastropoda
- Order: Stylommatophora
- Superfamily: Gastrodontoidea
- Family: Gastrodontidae
- Genus: Zonitoides
- Species: Z. patuloides

Binomial name
- Zonitoides patuloides (Pilsbry, 1895)

Synonyms
- Gastrodonta (Pseudohyalina) patuloides Pilsbry, 1895 (original combination); Gastrodonta patuloides Pilsbry, 1895 superseded combination

Species of gastropod

Zonitoides patuloides is a species of small, air-breathing land snail, a terrestrial pulmonate gastropod mollusk in the family Gastrodontidae.

== Description ==
The altitude of the shell attains 2.5 mm (0.10 in), its diameter 5.1 mm (0.20 in).

(Original description) The shell has about the size and form of Pyramidula striatella (J. G. Anthony, 1840) (synonym of Discus whitneyi (Newcomb, 1864) ). It is light green and hardly transparent. The shell is irregularly but closely rib-striate above, below and in the umbilicus. The first 1½ whorls are smooth. The 4½ whorls are slowly increasing, convex, with impressed sutures. The last whorl is rather tubular, rounded at periphery and below. The aperture has about the size of the umbilicus. It is round-lunate, flattened above. The lip is simple. The upper margin is flattened down and arched forward, as in Selenites or Gastrodonta elliotti and retracted at insertion. The umbilicus is large, showing all the whorls very plainly.

It is much smaller than Gastrodonta elliotti Redf., with far larger, open umbilicus and heavier sculpture, recalling a Pyramidula.

== Distribution ==
This species is found on the Thunderhead Mountain along the border between Tennessee and North Carolina, USA on mountainsides and ravines on moist leaves.
