= Zonitoides elliotti =

Conservation status
- Apparently Secure (NatureServe)

Scientific classification
- Kingdom: Animalia
- Phylum: Mollusca
- Class: Gastropoda
- Order: Stylommatophora
- Superfamily: Gastrodontoidea
- Family: Gastrodontidae
- Genus: Zonitoides
- Species: Z. elliotti

Binomial name
- Zonitoides elliotti (Redfield, 1858)

Synonyms
- Helix elliotti Redfield, 1858 (original combination); Ventridens elliotti (Redfield, 1856) - Pilsbry, 1949; Zonites elliotti (Redfield, 1858) (unaccepted combination)

Species of gastropod

Zonitoides elliotti, the green dome, is a species of small air-breathing land snail, a terrestrial pulmonate gastropod mollusk in the family Gastrodontidae.

== Description ==
The height of the shell ranges between 4 and 4.9 mm (0.16 and 0.19 in), its diameter varies from 7.5 to 9 mm (0.30 to 0.35 in).

"This shell, featuring a moderately narrow umbilicus, is depressed-orbicular, exhibiting fine transverse striations. Its coloration is a greenish horn, with a subtle translucence and a glossy interior. The spire is convex, though not significantly elevated. It comprises five moderately convex whorls, with the body whorl occasionally showing a slight depression at the aperture. The suture is deeply impressed. The aperture is markedly oblique and lunate-circular. The peristome is slightly sinuate, acute, and thickened internally."

== Distribution ==
This species inhabits North America; it is native to the eastern United States (southern Appalachian Mountains, from West Virginia to northern Georgia and Alabama), found in leaf litter and among spongy logs.
