= Zonitoides multivolvis =

Scientific classification
- Kingdom: Animalia
- Phylum: Mollusca
- Class: Gastropoda
- Order: Stylommatophora
- Superfamily: Gastrodontoidea
- Family: Gastrodontidae
- Genus: Zonitoides
- Species: Z. multivolvis

Binomial name
- Zonitoides multivolvis Pilsbry, 1926

Synonyms
- Zonitoides (Zonitellus) multivolvis Pilsbry, 1926; Zonitoides (Zonitoides) multivolvis Pilsbry, 1926 · alternate representation

Species of gastropod

Zonitoides multivolvis is a species of small, air-breathing land snail, a terrestrial pulmonate gastropod mollusk in the family Gastrodontidae.

== Distribution ==
This species is found in Costa Rica.
