= Zonitoides silvanus =

Scientific classification
- Kingdom: Animalia
- Phylum: Mollusca
- Class: Gastropoda
- Order: Stylommatophora
- Superfamily: Gastrodontoidea
- Family: Gastrodontidae
- Genus: Zonitoides
- Species: †Z. silvanus

Binomial name
- †Zonitoides silvanus Wenz, 1924

Species of gastropod

Zonitoides silvanus is an extinct species of small, air-breathing land snail, a terrestrial pulmonate gastropod mollusk in the family Gastrodontidae.

== Distribution ==
Fossils of this species were originally found in Germany
