= Zonitoides apertus =

Scientific classification
- Kingdom: Animalia
- Phylum: Mollusca
- Class: Gastropoda
- Order: Stylommatophora
- Superfamily: Gastrodontoidea
- Family: Gastrodontidae
- Genus: Zonitoides
- Species: Z. apertus

Binomial name
- Zonitoides apertus Pilsbry & Hirase, 1904

Synonyms
- Nesovitrea (Perpolita) aperta Pilsbry & Hirase 1904

Species of gastropod

Zonitoides apertus is a species of small air-breathing land snail, a terrestrial pulmonate gastropod mollusk in the family Gastrodontidae.

== Description ==
The altitude of the shell is 2.1 mm (0.08 in), its diameter 4.7 mm (0.18 in).

(Original description) The shell is depressed and has a wide, open umbilicus. The spire is lightly convex. Its color is pale greenish corneous-brown when fresh. "Dead" shells are light brown. The glossy surface is closely, deeply and irregularly striate throughout except the first whorl which is nearly smooth. There are no spiral striae. The shell contains four whorls. These are slightly increasing at first. The body whorl is much wider, double the width of the penultimate whorl. They are rounded at the periphery. The aperture is oblique, oval-lunate, decidedly wider than high. The peristome is simple.

== Distribution ==
This species occurs in Japan.
