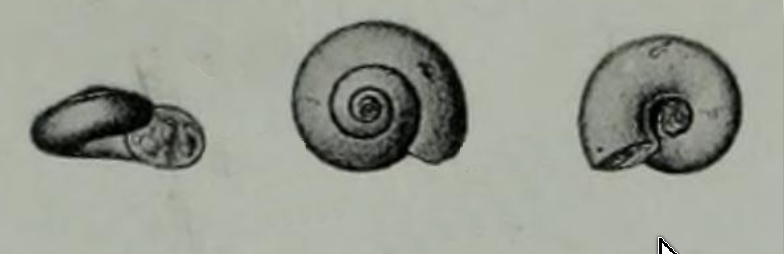
- Shell of Aegopinella reussi (holotype)

Scientific classification
- Domain: Eukaryota
- Kingdom: Animalia
- Phylum: Mollusca
- Class: Gastropoda
- Order: Stylommatophora
- Family: Gastrodontidae
- Genus: Aegopinella
- Species: †A. reussi

Binomial name
- †Aegopinella reussi (M. Hörnes, 1856)

Synonyms
- † Hyalina reussi Schlosser, 1907 junior subjective synonym; † Oxychilus (Oxychilus) reussi M. Hörnes, 1856 superseded combination; † Planorbis reussi M. Hörnes, 1856 superseded combination

= Aegopinella reussi =

Species of gastropod

Aegopinella reussi is an extinct species of small land snail, a terrestrial pulmonate gastropod mollusk in the family Gastrodontidae, the glass snails.

== Description ==
The shell's diameter is 8.3 mm (0.33 inches), and its height is 4.2 mm (0.17 inches).

(Original description in German) The shell is very flat and conical, with an almost flat apex and a moderately flattened, not very wide, and continuously umbilical lower end. It consists of five slightly arched whorls, separated by deep sutures. The body whorl is approximately three-quarters the height of the total shell. The obliquely positioned aperture is broadly moon-shaped and features simple, sharp edges.

== Distribution ==
Fossils of this extinct species were found in late Miocene strata in the Vienna Basin, Austria.
