= Retinella stabilei =

Conservation status
- Data Deficient (IUCN 3.1)

Scientific classification
- Kingdom: Animalia
- Phylum: Mollusca
- Class: Gastropoda
- Order: Stylommatophora
- Family: Gastrodontidae
- Genus: Retinella
- Species: R. stabilei

Binomial name
- Retinella stabilei (Pollonera, 1886)

Species of gastropod

Retinella stabilei is a species of snail in the family Zonitidae, the true glass snails. This species is endemic to Italy, where it lives in shady woodland habitat.
