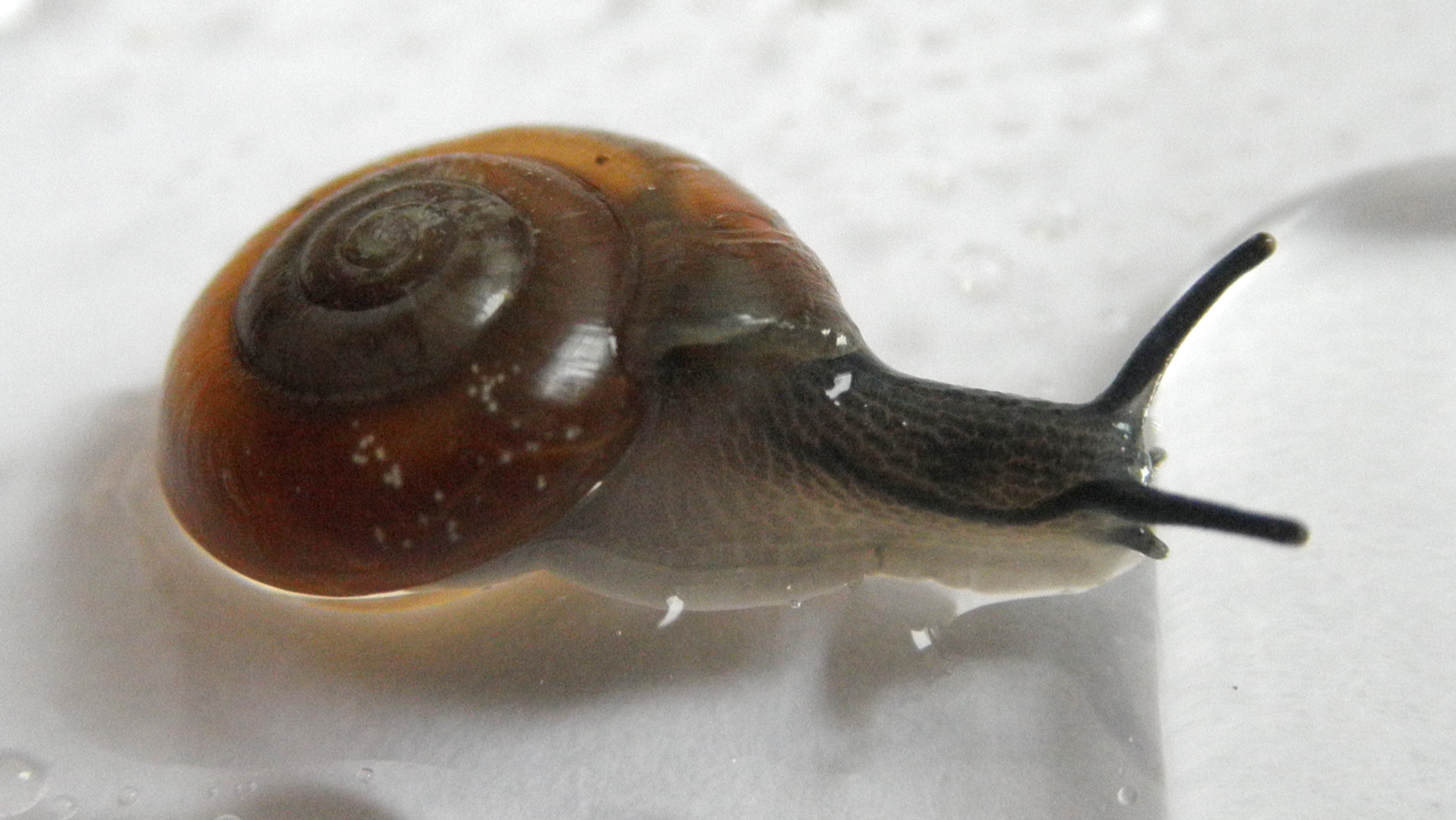
- a live Aegopinella nitidula

Scientific classification
- Kingdom: Animalia
- Phylum: Mollusca
- Class: Gastropoda
- Order: Stylommatophora
- Infraorder: Limacoidei
- Superfamily: Gastrodontoidea
- Family: Gastrodontidae
- Genus: Aegopinella; Lindholm, 1927

Type species
- Helix pura Alder, 1830

Synonyms
- Aegopina (Aegopinella) Lindholm, 1927 (original rank); Aegopinella (Politenella) Balashov, 2016 junior subjective synonym; Politenella Balashov, 2016

= Aegopinella =

Genus of gastropods

Aegopinella is a genus of small, air-breathing land snails, terrestrial pulmonate gastropod mollusks in the family Gastrodontidae, the glass snails.

== Species ==
Species in the genus Aegopinella include:

- † Aegopinella bourdieri Rousseau & Puisségur, 1989
- Aegopinella cisalpina A. Riedel, 1983
- † Aegopinella denudata (Reuss in Reuss & Meyer, 1849) (accepted > unreplaced junior homonym, junior homonym of Helix denudata Rossmässler, 1836)
- † Aegopinella depressula Harzhauser & Neubauer, 2018
- Aegopinella epipedostoma (Fagot, 1879)
- † Aegopinella erecta (Gottschick, 1920)
- Aegopinella forcarti A. Riedel, 1983
- Aegopinella graziadei (Boeckel, 1940)
- † Aegopinella lozeki Schlickum, 1975
- † Aegopinella lozekiana Stworzewicz, 1976
- Aegopinella minor (Stabile, 1864)
- Aegopinella nitens (Michaud, 1831)
- Aegopinella nitidula (Draparnaud, 1805)
- † Aegopinella procellaria (Jooss, 1918)
- Aegopinella pura (Alder, 1830)
- Aegopinella ressmanni (Westerlund, 1883)
- † Aegopinella reussi (M. Hörnes, 1856)
- † Aegopinella reyi Schlickum, 1975
- † Aegopinella subnitens (Klein, 1853)
- † Aegopinella vetusta (Klika, 1891)

Synonyms

- Aegopinella inermis A. J. Wagner, 1907: synonym of Aegopinella minor (Stabile, 1864) (junior synonym)
- † Aegopinella lozeki Stworzewicz, 1975 : synonym of † Aegopinella lozekiana Stworzewicz, 1976 (junior homonym of Aegopinella lozeki Schlickum, 1975; Aegopinella lozekiana is a replacement name)
