= Aegopinella reyi =

Scientific classification
- Domain: Eukaryota
- Kingdom: Animalia
- Phylum: Mollusca
- Class: Gastropoda
- Order: Stylommatophora
- Family: Gastrodontidae
- Genus: Aegopinella
- Species: †A. reyi

Binomial name
- †Aegopinella reyi Schlickum, 1975

Species of gastropod

Aegopinella reyi is an extinct species of small land snail, a terrestrial pulmonate gastropod mollusk in the family Gastrodontidae, the glass snails.

== Distribution ==
Fossils of this extinct species were found in late Pliocene strata in Cessey-sur-Tille, Côte-d'Or, France.
