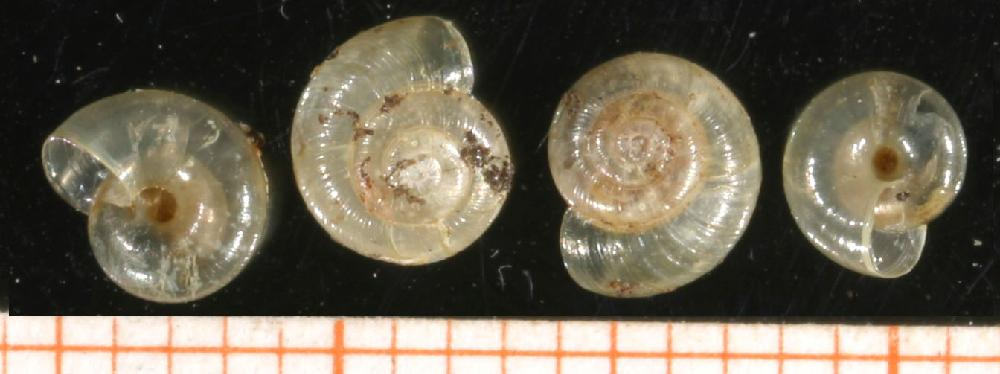

Scientific classification
- Kingdom: Animalia
- Phylum: Mollusca
- Class: Gastropoda
- Order: Stylommatophora
- Family: Gastrodontidae
- Genus: Perpolita
- Species: P. petronella

Binomial name
- Perpolita petronella (L. Pfeiffer, 1853)

Synonyms
- Helix petronella L. Pfeiffer, 1853 (original combination); Hyalinia petronella (L. Pfeiffer, 1853) (unaccepted combination); Nesovitrea petronella (L. Pfeiffer, 1853)

= Perpolita petronella =

Species of gastropod

Perpolita petronella is a species of air-breathing land snail, a terrestrial pulmonate gastropod mollusc in the family Gastrodontidae.

== Distribution ==
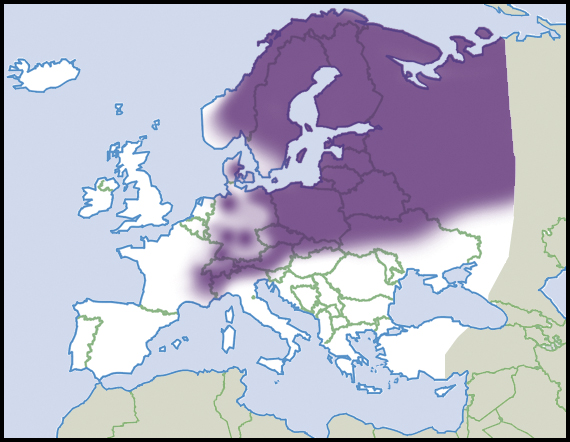
Distribution

This species occurs in:

- Norway
- Czech Republic
- Ukraine
