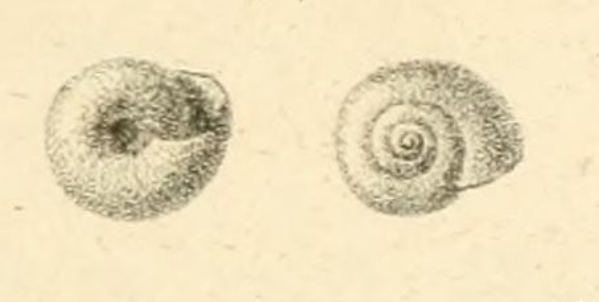
- Shell of Aegopinella subnitens (holotype)

Scientific classification
- Domain: Eukaryota
- Kingdom: Animalia
- Phylum: Mollusca
- Class: Gastropoda
- Order: Stylommatophora
- Family: Gastrodontidae
- Genus: Aegopinella
- Species: †A. subnitens

Binomial name
- †Aegopinella subnitens (Klein, 1853)

Synonyms
- † Helix subnitens Klein, 1853 superseded combination; † Hyalina undorfensis Clessin, 1894 junior subjective synonym; † Hyalinia (Hyalinia) subnitens (Klein, 1853) superseded combination; † Hyalinia (Hyalinia) subnitens f. recedens Gottschick, 1920 junior subjective synonym; † Oxychilus subnitens (Klein, 1853) superseded combination; † Oxychilus subnitens recedens (Gottschick, 1920) junior subjective synonym

= Aegopinella subnitens =

Species of gastropod

Aegopinella subnitens is an extinct species of small land snail, a terrestrial pulmonate gastropod mollusk in the family Gastrodontidae, the glass snails.

== Description ==
(Original description in Latin) The shell is distinctly umbilicate and depressed, with a flat and glabrous surface. It is shiny and consists of 4.5 convex whorls that gradually increase in size, with the body whorl slightly expanded anteriorly. The aperture is ovate-lunate, and the peristome is simple and acute, with the apertural lip being non-callous.

== Distribution ==
Fossils of this extinct species were found in late Miocene strata in Baden-Württemberg, Germany and in southern Poland.
