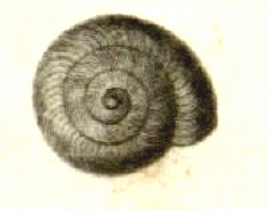
- Drawing of Zonitoides limatulus (original image)

Conservation status
- Apparently Secure (NatureServe)

Scientific classification
- Kingdom: Animalia
- Phylum: Mollusca
- Class: Gastropoda
- Order: Stylommatophora
- Superfamily: Gastrodontoidea
- Family: Gastrodontidae
- Genus: Zonitoides
- Species: Z. limatulus

Binomial name
- Zonitoides limatulus (A. Binney, 1840)

Synonyms
- Helix limatulus A. Binney, 1840

= Zonitoides limatulus =

Species of gastropod

Zonitoides limatulus is a species of small, air-breathing land snail, a terrestrial pulmonate gastropod mollusk in the family Gastrodontidae.

== Description ==
The altitude of the shell attains 2.5 mm (0.10 in), its diameter 5.1 mm (0.20 in).

The small shell is convex-depressed. The epidermis is white and immaculate. The suture is distinctly impressed. The shell contains more than four whorls. These are convex with very fine, oblique, parallel striae, which become obsolete on the base. The aperture is sub-circular, slightly modified by the penultimate whorl. The lip is thin and acute. The umbilicus is large and deep, not exhibiting all the whorls.

== Distribution ==
This species is found in many places in Ohio and Indiana, USA. It is found on low grounds bordering on the Ohio and its tributaries.
