= Aegopinella procellaria =

Scientific classification
- Domain: Eukaryota
- Kingdom: Animalia
- Phylum: Mollusca
- Class: Gastropoda
- Order: Stylommatophora
- Family: Gastrodontidae
- Genus: Aegopinella
- Species: †A. procellaria

Binomial name
- †Aegopinella procellaria (Jooss, 1918)

Synonyms
- † Hyalinia procellaria Jooss, 1918 superseded combination; † Hyalinia (Hyalina) procellaria Jooss, 1918 superseded combination; † Oxychilus procellarius (Jooss, 1918) superseded combination

Species of gastropod

Aegopinella procellaria is an extinct species of small land snail, a terrestrial pulmonate gastropod mollusk in the family Gastrodontidae, the glass snails.

== Description ==
(Original description in German) The shell is thin and shiny, with an almost flat upper surface and a strongly flattened lower surface. It is moderately wide and has a continuous umbilicus. The shell consists of five whorls, which are extremely finely striped and separated by deep sutures. The body whorl is very weakly keeled. The aperture is obliquely positioned and broadly moon-shaped, and has simple, sharp edges.

== Distribution ==
Fossils of this extinct species were found in late Miocene strata in Mössingen, Baden-Württemberg, Germany.
