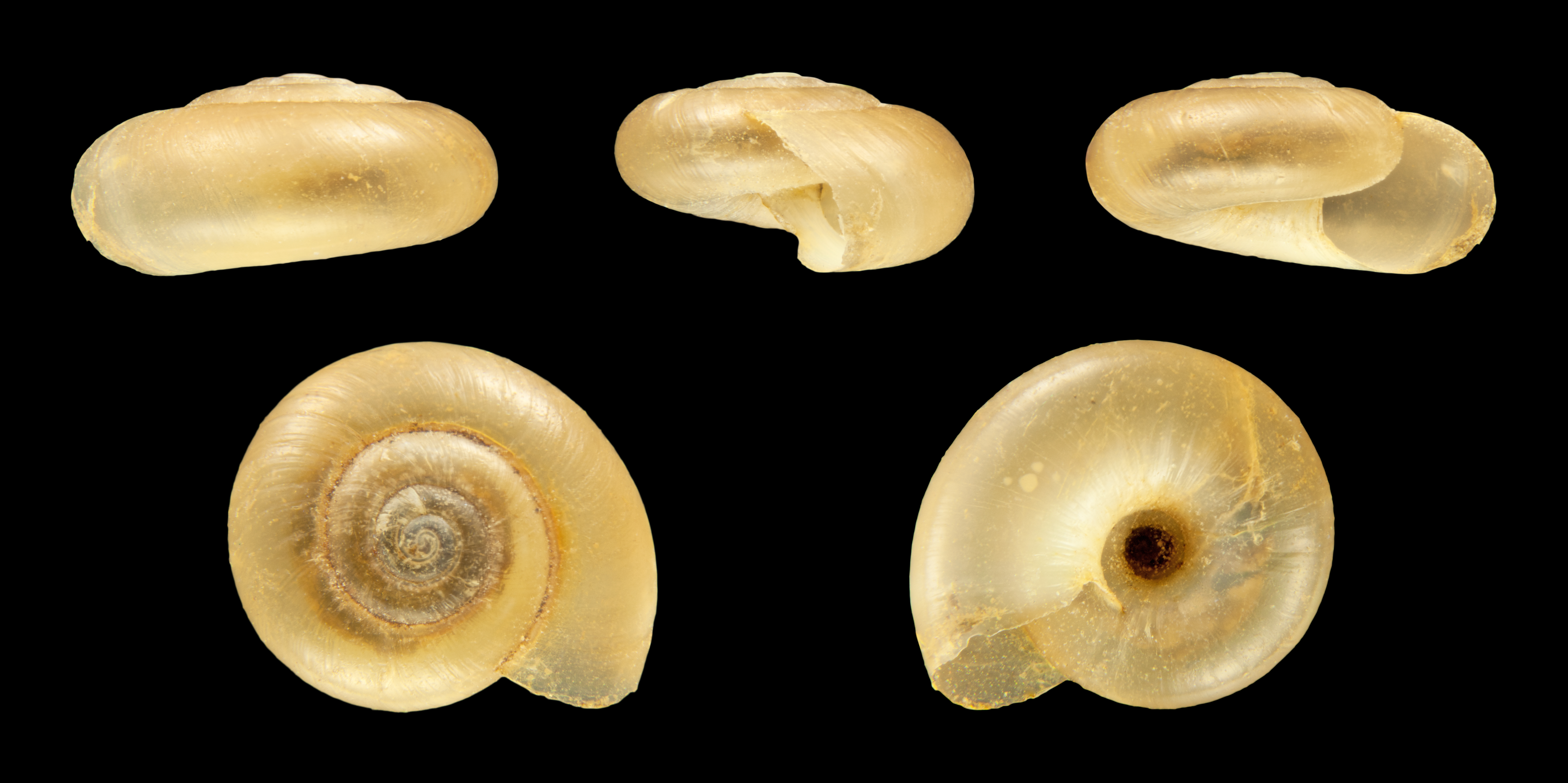
- Two shells of Zonitoides nitidus

Conservation status
- Secure (NatureServe)

Scientific classification
- Kingdom: Animalia
- Phylum: Mollusca
- Class: Gastropoda
- Order: Stylommatophora
- Superfamily: Gastrodontoidea
- Family: Gastrodontidae
- Genus: Zonitoides
- Species: Z. nitidus

Binomial name
- Zonitoides nitidus (Müller, 1774)

Synonyms
- Helicella nitida (O. F. Müller, 1774) superseded combination; Helix hydrophyla Miles, 1861 (nomen nudum); Helix nitida O. F. Müller, 1774 (original combination); Hyalina (Euhyalina) yessoensis Reinhardt, 1877 (junior synonym); Oxychilus lucidus (Draparnaud, 1801) junior subjective synonym; Zonites nitidus (O. F. Müller, 1774) superseded combination; Zonitoides (Zonitoides) nitidus (O. F. Müller, 1774) alternate representation; Zonitoides nitidus var. borealis Clessin, 1878 (junior synonym); Zonitoides subarboreus Pilsbry, 1902 (junior synonym)

= Zonitoides nitidus =

Species of gastropod

Zonitoides nitidus (sometimes Zonitoides nitida), also known as the shiny glass snail or black gloss, is a species of small, air-breathing land snail, a terrestrial pulmonate gastropod mollusc in the family Gastrodontidae.

It is the type species of the genus Zonitoides.

== Distribution ==
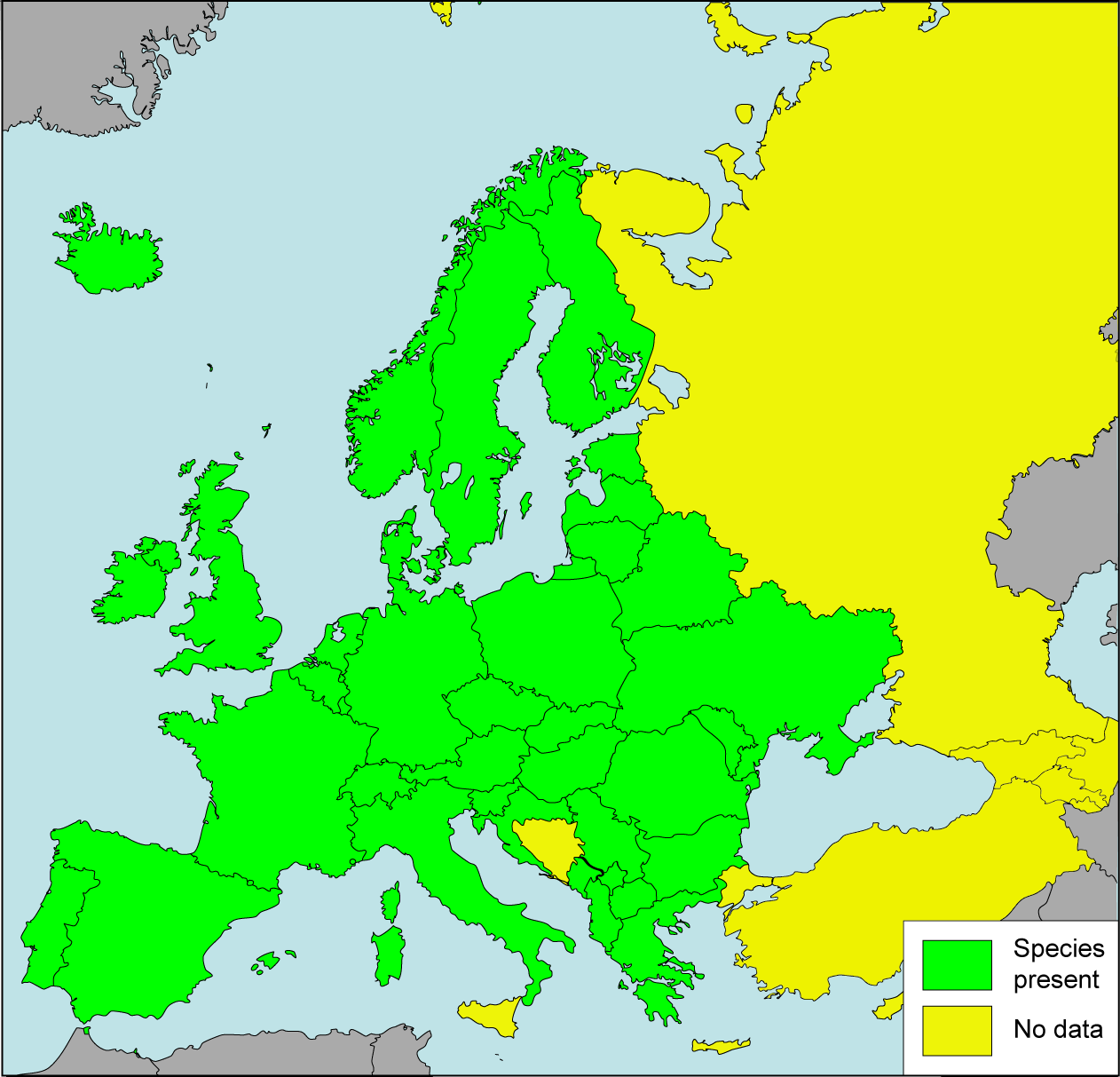
Distribution

Zonitoides nitidus has a Holarctic distribution. It is found in most of Europe, except the southernmost regions.

- Czech Republic – least concern (LC)
- Netherlands
- Russia – Tver, Moscow, Novgorod, and Ulyanovsk
- Ukraine
- Slovakia
- Great Britain – north British highland zones and not in north Scotland. In some regions in Britain the species has declined due to drainage.
- Ireland
- Hebrides
- Orkney
- Shetland
- rare in northern Greece
- Canada

The non-indigenous distribution of this species includes:

- introduced to Menorca

== Description ==
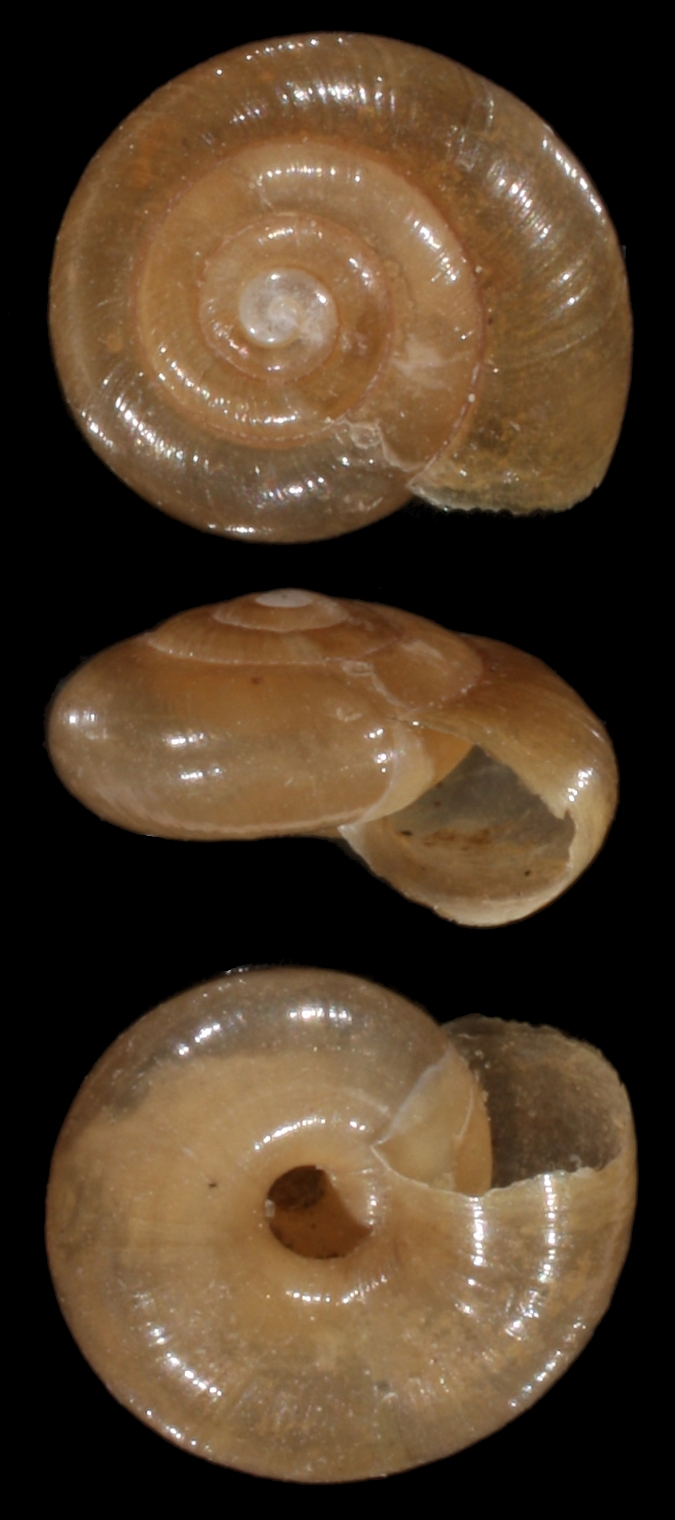
Photo of the shell.

The shell of Z. nitidus is reddish brown. The umbilicus is large: almost 25% of shell diameter. The shell has radial growth lines. It is wider than it is tall. It is 6–7 mm (0.24–0.28 in) wide and 3.5–4.0 mm (0.14–0.16 in) tall.

The body of the adult animal is black with an orange dash: the (mantle gland is visible under the shell's aperture). Juveniles are whitish grey with light brown translucent shells.

== Ecology ==
Zonitoides nitidus occurs in wet meadows and river woods, usually near water bodies, swamps and swampy forests, in the zone of emergent vegetation. Man-made habitats such as pools in old quarries are sometimes colonized after a few years. In Switzerland it is found up to 2100m (6900 ft) of altitude.

Zonitoides nitidus is largely herbivorous, but is malacophagous in summer. Z. nitidus feed on disintegrating leaves, mushrooms, roots and fruit, but they do not eat dry leaves. When consuming soft food such as mushrooms or soft fruits, Z. nitidus penetrates perpendicularly inside; the entire animal including its shell can penetrate inside the fruit. In summer, Z. nitidus prey upon snails and bivalves.

In Germany up to three clutches of 2–9 eggs per individual are laid in all seasons, with some days or weeks spacing between egg-laying. Egg diameter is 1.0–1.6 mm (0.04–0.06 in). Eggs are laid loose into the soil. Juveniles have 1.5 whorls (diameter 1–1.2 mm, 0.04–0.05 in) after hatching. They start feeding on disintegrating plant remains in the soil. After 3 months the shell diameter reaches up to 3 mm (0.12 in) under favourable conditions, after 10 months 6 mm (0.24 in), and full size after slightly more than one year. Maximum age is 18 months under laboratory conditions.

Parasites of Zonitoides nitidus include:

- Elaphostrongylus spp.
- Parelaphostrongylus tenuis
