= Aegopinella erecta =

Scientific classification
- Domain: Eukaryota
- Kingdom: Animalia
- Phylum: Mollusca
- Class: Gastropoda
- Order: Stylommatophora
- Family: Gastrodontidae
- Genus: Aegopinella
- Species: †A. erecta

Binomial name
- †Aegopinella erecta (Gottschick, 1920)

Synonyms
- † Hyalinia (Hyalinia) subnitens var. erecta Gottschick, 1920 (superseded rank and combination); † Oxychilus subnitens erectum (Gottschick, 1920) (superseded rank and combination)

Species of gastropod

Aegopinella erecta is an extinct species of small land snail, a terrestrial pulmonate gastropod mollusk in the family Gastrodontidae, the glass snails.

== Distribution ==
Fossils of this extinct species were found in Tertiary strata in Steinheim am Albuch, Baden-Württemberg, Germany.
