= Aegopinella depressula =

Scientific classification
- Kingdom: Animalia
- Phylum: Mollusca
- Class: Gastropoda
- Order: Stylommatophora
- Family: Gastrodontidae
- Genus: Aegopinella
- Species: †A. depressula

Binomial name
- †Aegopinella depressula Harzhauser & Neubauer, 2018

Species of gastropod

Aegopinella depressula is an extinct species of small land snail, a terrestrial pulmonate gastropod mollusk in the family Gastrodontidae, the glass snails.

== Description ==
The diameter of the shell attains 6 mm (0.24 in), its height 1.45 mm (0.06 in).

== Distribution ==
Fossils of this extinct species were found in middle Miocene strata near Opole, Poland.
