= Aegopinella denudata =

Scientific classification
- Domain: Eukaryota
- Kingdom: Animalia
- Phylum: Mollusca
- Class: Gastropoda
- Order: Stylommatophora
- Family: Gastrodontidae
- Genus: Aegopinella
- Species: †A. denudata

Binomial name
- †Aegopinella denudata (Reuss, 1849)

Synonyms
- † Helix denudata Reuss, 1849 superseded combination; † Hyalina denudata (Reuss, 1849) superseded combination; † Hyalina denudata var. sculpta Babor, 1897 junior subjective synonym; † Oxychilus (Oxychilus) denudatum (Reuss, 1849) superseded combination; † Oxychilus (Oxychilus) denudatum sculptum (Babor, 1897) junior subjective synonym

Species of gastropod

Aegopinella denudata is an extinct species of small land snail, a terrestrial pulmonate gastropod mollusk in the family Gastrodontidae, the glass snails.

== Description ==
The diameter of the shell attains 14 mm (0.6 in), its height 4.5 mm (0.2 in).

(Original description in Latin) The solid shell is depressed and flat spire and a broad, open umbilicus. It is shiny and shows microscopically small spiral striations. It features 5.5 convex whorls. The sutures are moderately impressed. The wide and elongate-ovoid aperture is depressed-lunate. The body whorl expands rapidly. The peristome is acute, simple, and straight. It exhibits a creeping growth pattern.

== Distribution ==
Fossils of this extinct species were found in Miocene strata in the Czech Republic.
