= Aegopinella bourdieri =

Scientific classification
- Domain: Eukaryota
- Kingdom: Animalia
- Phylum: Mollusca
- Class: Gastropoda
- Order: Stylommatophora
- Family: Gastrodontidae
- Genus: Aegopinella
- Species: †A. bourdieri

Binomial name
- †Aegopinella bourdieri Rousseau & Puisségur, 1989

Species of gastropod

Aegopinella bourdieri is an extinct species of small land snail, a terrestrial pulmonate gastropod mollusk in the family Gastrodontidae, the glass snails.

== Distribution ==
Fossils of this extinct species were found in Normandy, France.
