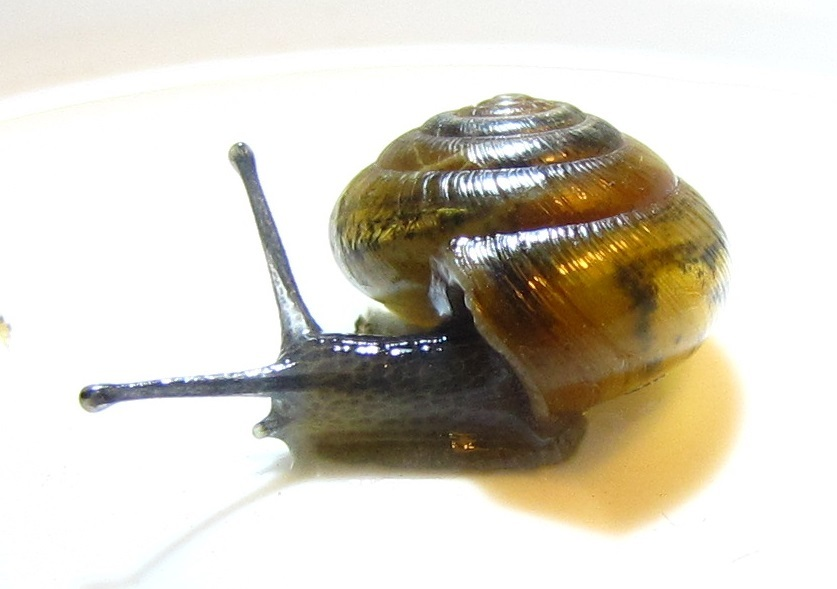
- Ventridens demissus

Scientific classification
- Kingdom: Animalia
- Phylum: Mollusca
- Class: Gastropoda
- Order: Stylommatophora
- Family: Gastrodontidae
- Genus: Ventridens; Binney & Bland, 1869

= Ventridens =

Genus of gastropods

Ventridens is a genus of air-breathing land snails, terrestrial pulmonate gastropod mollusks in the family Gastrodontidae.

== Species ==
Species in the genus Ventridens include:

- Ventridens acerra – glossy dome
- Ventridens arcellus – golden dome
- Ventridens brittsi – western dome
- Ventridens cerinoideus – wax dome
- Ventridens coelaxis – bidentate dome
- Ventridens collisella – sculptured dome
- Ventridens decussatus – crossed dome
- Ventridens demissus – perforate dome
- Ventridens eutropis – carinate dome
- Ventridens gularis – throaty dome
- Ventridens intertextus – pyramid dome
- Ventridens lasmodon – hollow dome
- Ventridens lawae – rounded dome
- Ventridens ligera – globose dome
- Ventridens monodon – blade dome
- Ventridens percallosus – Tennessee dome
- Ventridens pilsbryi – yellow dome
- Ventridens suppressus – flat dome
- Ventridens theloides – copper dome
- Ventridens virginicus – split-tooth dome
- Ventridens volusiae – Seminole dome

== See also ==
=== Studies ===
- C. M. Sinclair-Winters, Journal of Molluscan Studies, 2014. Upstream or downstream? Population structure of the land snail Ventridens ligera (Say, 1821) in the Potomac River drainage basin. 80 (), 280 - 285
