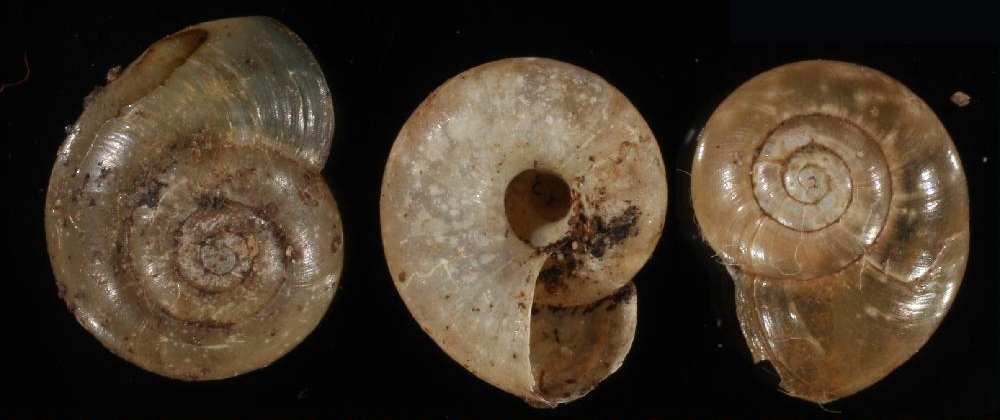
- Shell of Aegopinella forcarti

Scientific classification
- Domain: Eukaryota
- Kingdom: Animalia
- Phylum: Mollusca
- Class: Gastropoda
- Order: Stylommatophora
- Family: Gastrodontidae
- Genus: Aegopinella
- Species: A. forcarti

Binomial name
- Aegopinella forcarti A. Riedel, 1983
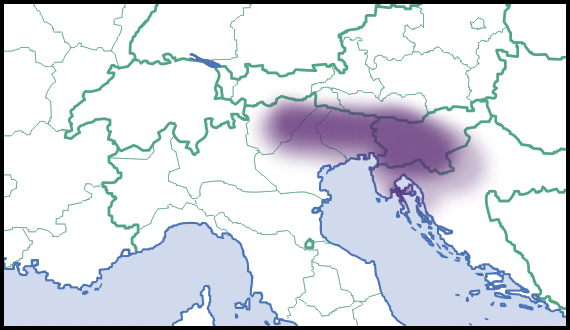

= Aegopinella forcarti =

Species of gastropod

Aegopinella forcarti is a species of small land snail, a terrestrial pulmonate gastropod mollusk in the family Gastrodontidae, the glass snails.

== Description ==
The diameter of the shell attains 11 mm (0.43 in), its height 5.5 mm (0.22 in).

== Distribution ==
This species occurs in the Southeastern Alps: Italy, Southern Austria, Slovenia and Croatia.
