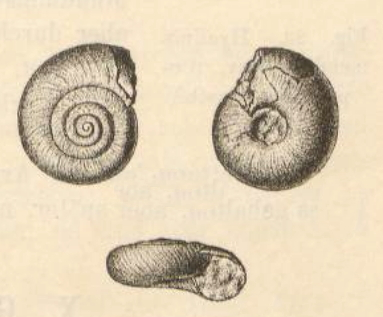
- Shell of † Aegopinella vetusta (holotype)

Scientific classification
- Domain: Eukaryota
- Kingdom: Animalia
- Phylum: Mollusca
- Class: Gastropoda
- Order: Stylommatophora
- Family: Gastrodontidae
- Genus: Aegopinella
- Species: †A. vetusta

Binomial name
- †Aegopinella vetusta (Klika, 1891)

Synonyms
- † Hyalinia vetusta Klika, 1891 superseded combination; † Oxychilus (Oxychilus) vetustum (Klika, 1891) superseded combinatio

= Aegopinella vetusta =

Species of gastropod

Aegopinella vetusta is an extinct species of small land snail, a terrestrial pulmonate gastropod mollusk in the family Gastrodontidae, the glass snails.

== Description ==
The diameter of the shell attains 10 mm (0.39 in), its height 4.2 mm (0.17 in).

(Original description in Latin) The shell is solid, flattened, and shiny, with a wide, accessible umbilicus. It features five whorls that are nearly flat on top and convex, with a very obtuse keel. These whorls are separated by a thin, superficial suture. The first and second whorls are smooth, while the remaining whorls are adorned with oblique, flattened ribs. The lower part of the shell is almost glabrous and shiny. The aperture is almost rounded, with simple, sharp lips joined by a thin callus.

(Originally described in German) The shell is fairly thick and shiny, with a very flat top and a wide, fully umbilical underside. It consists of five whorls that are almost flat on top and curved below, with very blunt keels. The whorls are separated by narrow, superficial sutures. Except for the smooth first and second whorls, the whorls are covered with clear, blunt, and extensive growth striations. The underside is almost smooth and shiny. The aperture is elongated and rounded, slightly oblique, with simple, sharp edges connected by a fine callus.

== Distribution ==
Fossils of this extinct species were found in Miocene strata in the Czech Republic.
