= Ventridens acerra =

Conservation status
- Apparently Secure (NatureServe)

Scientific classification
- Kingdom: Animalia
- Phylum: Mollusca
- Class: Gastropoda
- Order: Stylommatophora
- Family: Gastrodontidae
- Genus: Ventridens
- Species: V. acerra

Binomial name
- Ventridens acerra (Lewis, 1870)

Synonyms
- Helix acerra Lewis, 1871; Helix annae Lewis, 1871

Species of gastropod

Ventridens acerra, commonly known as the glossy dome, is a species of small land snail in the family Gastrodontidae.

== Distribution ==
Ventridens acerra is found in Alabama, the southwest of Virginia, West Virginia, Tennessee, North Carolina and Georgia.

== Habitat ==
It is found in hardwood forests on hillsides under leaf litter, under 1200 m in elevation.
