= Edusa =

Edusa may refer to:

- Edusa Chevrolat in Dejean, 1836, a synonym of Edusella, a genus of leaf beetles
- Edusa Gistel, 1848, illegitimate homonym and synonym of Thalia, a genus of tunicates
- Edusa Albers, 1860, illegitimate homonym and synonym of Mesomphix, a genus of gastropods
- Edusa, also known as Edesia and Edulica, a Roman goddess of nourishment who guarded over children as they learned to eat solid foods
