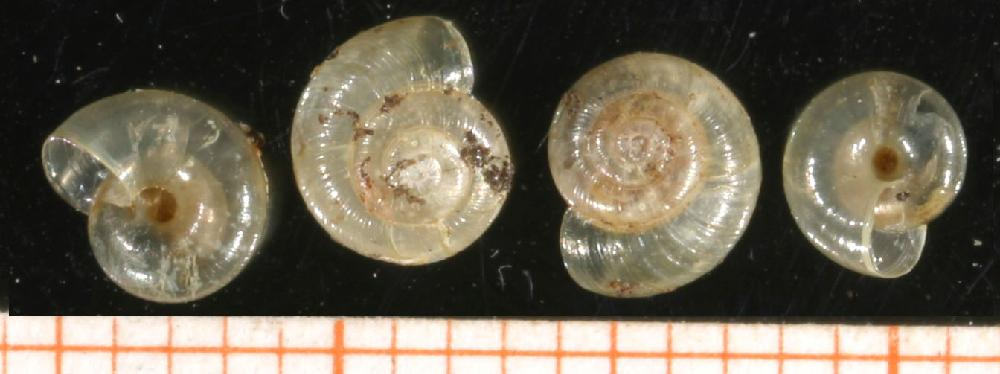

Scientific classification
- Kingdom: Animalia
- Phylum: Mollusca
- Class: Gastropoda
- Order: Stylommatophora
- Infraorder: Limacoidei
- Superfamily: Gastrodontoidea
- Family: Gastrodontidae
- Genus: Perpolita; Baker, 1928

Type species
- † Perplicaria perplexa Dall, 1890

Synonyms
- Nesovitrea (Perpolita) H. B. Baker, 1928; Retinella (Perpolita) H. B. Baker, 1928

= Perpolita =

Genus of molluscs

Perpolita is a genus of air-breathing land snails, terrestrial pulmonate gastropod mollusks in the family Gastrodontidae.

== Species ==
Species within this genus include:

- Perpolita binneyana (Morse, 1864)
- Perpolita boettgeriana (Clessin, 1877)
- Perpolita dalliana (Simpson, 1889)
- †Perpolita disciformis Lueger, 1981
- Perpolita electrina (Gould, 1841)
- †Perpolita gliesei Schlickum & Strauch, 1975
- Perpolita hammonis (Strøm, 1765)
- † Perpolita mattiaca (O. Boettger, 1903)
- †Perpolita miocaenica (Andreae, 1902)
- Perpolita petronella (L.Pfeiffer, 1853)
- Perpolita pulchra (Pierce, 1992)
- † Perpolita riedeli Schlickum & Strauch, 1975
- † Perpolita subhammonis (Gottschick, 1928)
- Perpolita suzannae W.L.Pratt, 1978
- † Perpolita wenzi Schlickum & Strauch, 1975
