= Aegopinella lozekiana =

Scientific classification
- Domain: Eukaryota
- Kingdom: Animalia
- Phylum: Mollusca
- Class: Gastropoda
- Order: Stylommatophora
- Family: Gastrodontidae
- Genus: Aegopinella
- Species: †A. lozekiana

Binomial name
- †Aegopinella lozekiana Stworzewicz, 1976

Synonyms
- Aegopinella lozeki Stworzewicz, 1975 (junior homonym of Aegopinella lozeki Schlickum, 1975; Aegopinella lozekiana is a replacement name).

Species of gastropod

Aegopinella lozekiana is an extinct species of small land snail, a terrestrial pulmonate gastropod mollusk in the family Gastrodontidae, the glass snails.

== Distribution ==
Fossils of this extinct species were found in early Pleistocene strata in Kielniki near Częstochowa, Katowice Province, Poland.
