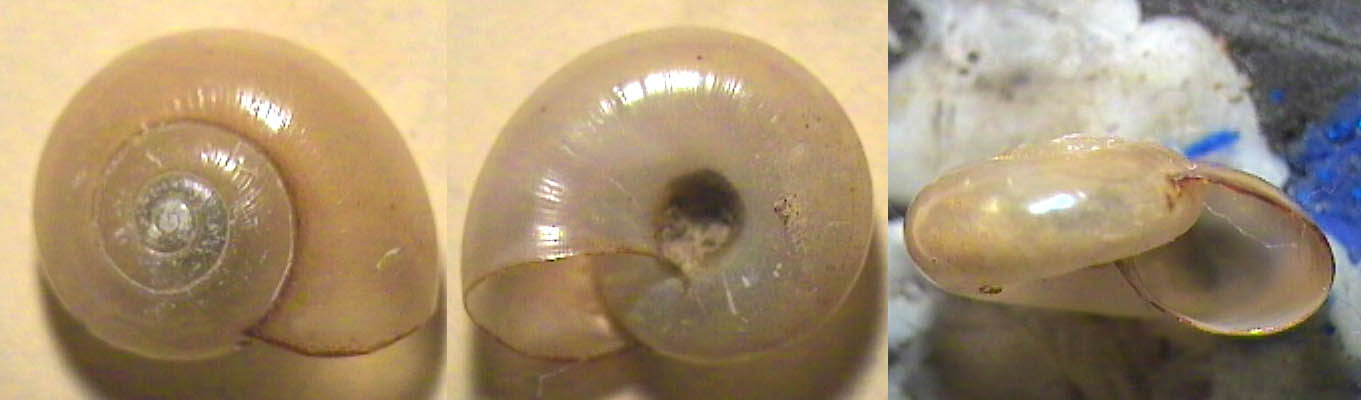
- Shell of Aegopinella cisalpina

Scientific classification
- Domain: Eukaryota
- Kingdom: Animalia
- Phylum: Mollusca
- Class: Gastropoda
- Order: Stylommatophora
- Family: Gastrodontidae
- Genus: Aegopinella
- Species: A. cisalpina

Binomial name
- Aegopinella cisalpina A. Riedel, 1983
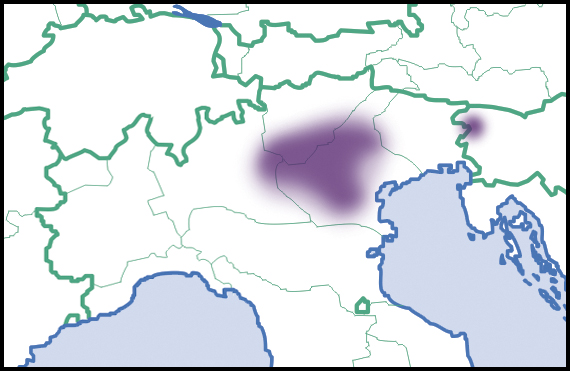

= Aegopinella cisalpina =

Species of gastropod

Aegopinella cisalpina is a species of small land snail, a terrestrial pulmonate gastropod mollusk in the family Gastrodontidae, the glass snails.

== Description ==
The diameter of the shell reaches 10–15.5 mm (0.4–0.6 in), its height 6–8 mm (0.2–0.3 in).

== Distribution ==
This species occurs in Italy.
