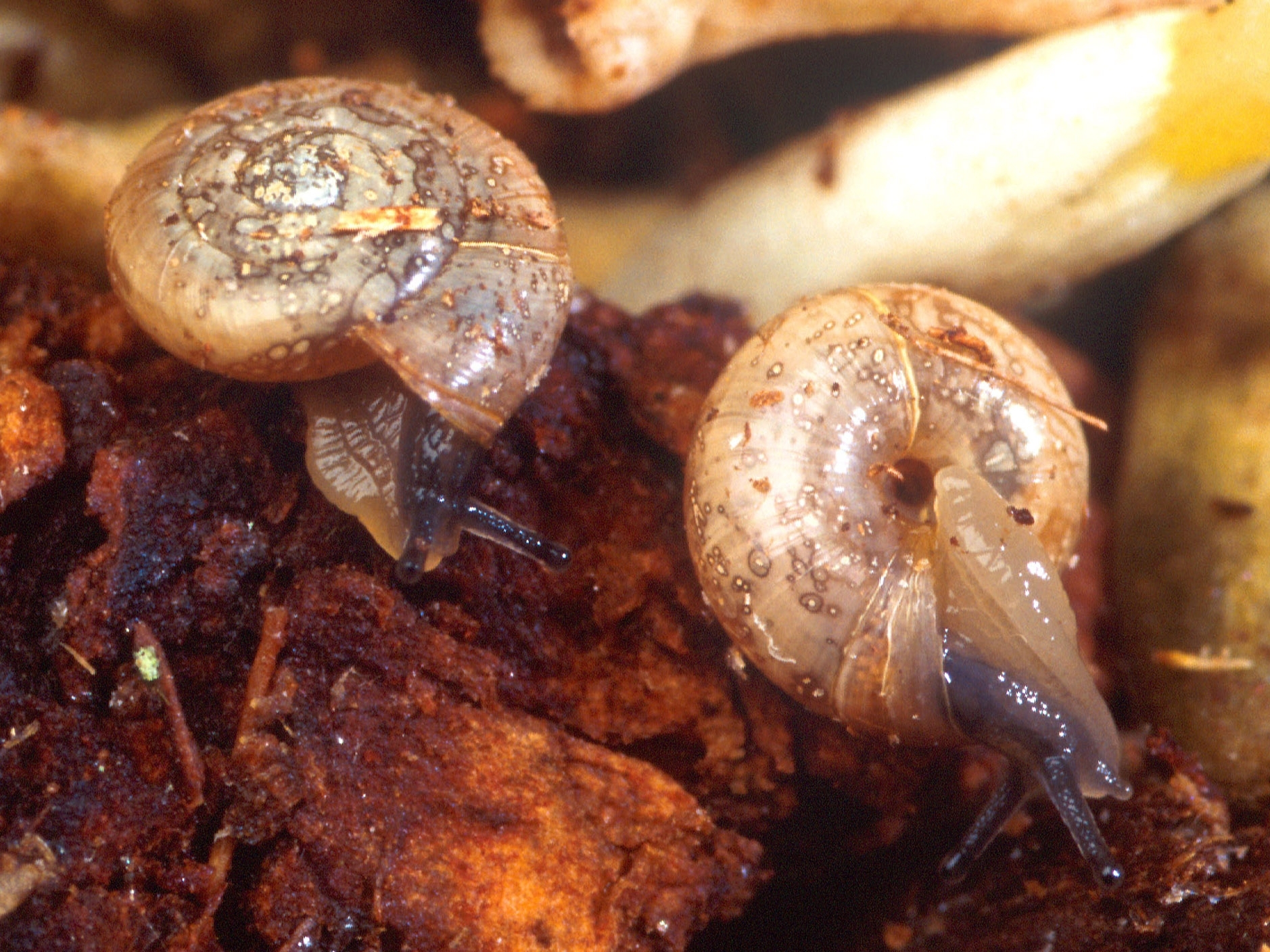
- Two individuals of Zonitoides arboreus on orchid plants

Scientific classification
- Kingdom: Animalia
- Phylum: Mollusca
- Class: Gastropoda
- Order: Stylommatophora
- Infraorder: Limacoidei
- Superfamily: Gastrodontoidea
- Family: Gastrodontidae
- Genus: Zonitoides; Lehmann, 1862

Synonyms
- Alienitor Iredale, 1937 (junior synonym); Hyalina (Zonitoides) Lehmann, 1862 superseded combination; Hyalinia (Zonitoides) Lehmann, 1862 (superseded generic combination); Zonitellus H. B. Baker, 1928; Zonitoides (Elliottius) Pilsbry, 1946 · alternate representation; Zonitoides (Pseudohyalus) H. B. Baker, 1929 · alternate representation; Zonitoides (Ventricallus) Pilsbry, 1946 · alternate representation; Zonitoides (Ventridens) W. G. Binney & Bland, 1869 · alternate representation; Zonitoides (Zonitellus) H. B. Baker, 1928 (junior synonym); Zonitoides (Zonitoides) Lehmann, 1862 · alternate representation

= Zonitoides =

Genus of gastropods

Zonitoides is a genus of air-breathing land snails, terrestrial gastropod mollusks in the family Gastrodontidae.

== Distribution ==
The distribution of Zonitoides includes North America, eastern and northern Asia, and Europe. Also in Australia (Queensland, Victoria, New South Wales, Lord Howe Island and Norfolk Island).

== Species ==
Species within the genus Zonitoides include:

- Zonitoides apertus Pilsbry & Hirase, 1904
- † Zonitoides apneus (Bourguignat, 1881)
- Zonitoides arboreus (Say, 1817)
- † Zonitoides cesseyensis Schlickum, 1975
- † Zonitoides choukoutienensis (Ping, 1929)
- † Zonitoides cretaceus Yen, 1969
- Zonitoides elliotti (Redfield, 1858)
- Zonitoides excavatus (Alder, 1830)
- Zonitoides glomerulus (E. von Martens, 1892)
- Zonitoides hoffmanni (Martens, 1892)
- Zonitoides jaccetanicus (Bourguignat, 1870)
- Zonitoides kirbyi R. W. Fullington, 1974
- Zonitoides lateumbilicatus (Pilsbry, 1895)
- Zonitoides limatulus (A. Binney, 1840)
- Zonitoides multivolvis (Pilsbry, 1926)
- Zonitoides nitidopsis (Morelet, 1851)
- Zonitoides nitidus (Müller, 1774) - type species
- Zonitoides notabilis (Sykes, 1897)
- Zonitoides ostauri Pilsbry, 1926
- Zonitoides patuloides (Pilsbry, 1895)
- † Zonitoides pellati (Deshayes, 1863)
- † Zonitoides schaireri Schlickum, 1978
- † Zonitoides sepultus Ložek, 1964
- † Zonitoides silvanus Wenz, 1924
- † Zonitoides subradiatulus (Łomnicki, 1886)
- † Zonitoides suevicus (Jooss, 1918)
- Zonitoides tehuantepecensis (Crosse & P. Fischer, 1870)
- † Zonitoides wenzi (Royo Gómez, 1928)

== Anatomy ==
Species in this genus of snails make and use love darts.
