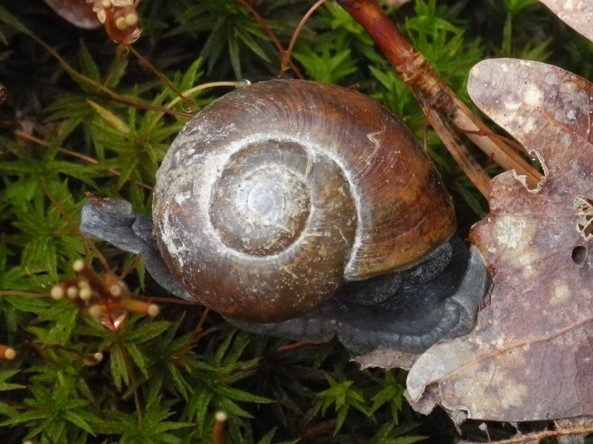
- Mesomphix rugeli

Scientific classification
- Domain: Eukaryota
- Kingdom: Animalia
- Phylum: Mollusca
- Class: Gastropoda
- Order: Stylommatophora
- Infraorder: Limacoidei
- Superfamily: Gastrodontoidea
- Family: Gastrodontidae
- Genus: Mesomphix; Rafinesque, 1819

Synonyms
- List: Edusa Albers, 1860; Hyalinia (Mesomphix) Rafinesque, 1819; Mesomphix (Mesomphix) Rafinesque, 1819; Mesomphix (Micromphix) Pilsbry, 1911; Mesomphix (Moreletia) Gray, 1855; Mesomphix (Omphalina) Rafinesque, 1831; Mesomphix (Omphix) Pilsbry, 1911·; Mesomphix (Zonyalina) E. von Martens, 1865; Murphitella (Namoitena) Iredale, 1933; Namoitena Iredale, 1933; Omphalina Rafinesque, 1831

= Mesomphix =

Genus of molluscs

Mesomphix is a genus of terrestrial gastropods belonging to the family Gastrodontidae.

The species of this genus are found in Europe, North America, and New Zealand.

== Species ==
- Mesomphix andrewsae (Pilsbry, 1895)
- Mesomphix anurus Hubricht, 1962
- Mesomphix bilineatus (L. Pfeiffer, 1846)
- Mesomphix capnodes (W.G. Binney, 1857)
- Mesomphix cupreus (Rafinesque, 1831)
- Mesomphix euryomphala (L. Pfeiffer, 1845)
- Mesomphix flora (L. Pfeiffer, 1850)
- Mesomphix friabilis (W.G. Binney, 1857)
- Mesomphix globosus (MacMillan, 1940)
- Mesomphix inornatus (Say, 1822)
- Mesomphix latior (Pilsbry, 1900)
- Mesomphix lucubratus (Say, 1829)
- Mesomphix luisant Dourson, 2015
- Mesomphix martensianus (Pilsbry, 1903)
- Mesomphix modestus (E. von Martens, 1892)
- Mesomphix paradensis (L. Pfeiffer, 1860)
- Mesomphix perfragilis (Wetherby, 1894)
- Mesomphix perlaevis (Pilsbry, 1900)
- Mesomphix pilsbryi (Clapp, 1904)
- Mesomphix pittieri (Bartsch, 1909)
- Mesomphix ptychoraphe (Weinland & Martens, 1859)
- Mesomphix rugeli (W.G. Binney, 1879)
- Mesomphix subplanus (A. Binney, 1842)
- Mesomphix tuxtlensis (Crosse & P. Fischer, 1870)
- Mesomphix vulgatus H. B. Baker, 1933
- Mesomphix zonites (L. Pfeiffer, 1845)

Species brought into synonymy

- Mesomphix derochetus Hubricht, 1962: synonym of Mesomphix vulgatus H. B. Baker, 1933
- Mesomphix ruidus Hubricht, 1958: synonym of Mesomphix globosus (MacMillan, 1940)
