= Janulus pompylius =

Conservation status
- Critically Endangered (IUCN 3.1)

Scientific classification
- Kingdom: Animalia
- Phylum: Mollusca
- Class: Gastropoda
- Order: Stylommatophora
- Family: Gastrodontidae
- Genus: Janulus
- Species: J. pompylius

Binomial name
- Janulus pompylius (Shuttleworth, 1852)

Synonyms
- Helix pompylia Shuttleworth, 1852

Species of gastropod

Janulus pompylius was a species of air-breathing land snail, a terrestrial pulmonate gastropod mollusk in the family Gastrodontidae. This species is now considered to be extinct.

== Distribution ==
This species was endemic to the island of La Palma, in the Canary Islands.
