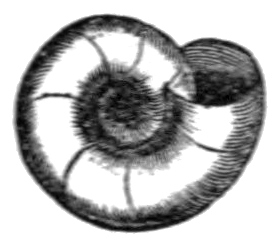
- An umbilical view of a shell of Striatura milium

Scientific classification
- Kingdom: Animalia
- Phylum: Mollusca
- Class: Gastropoda
- Order: Stylommatophora
- Family: Gastrodontidae
- Genus: Striatura; Morse, 1864

= Striatura =

Genus of gastropods

Striatura is a genus of minute air-breathing land snails, terrestrial pulmonate gastropod mollusks or micromollusks in the family Gastrodontidae.

== Species ==
Species within the genus Striatura include:

- Striatura milium
