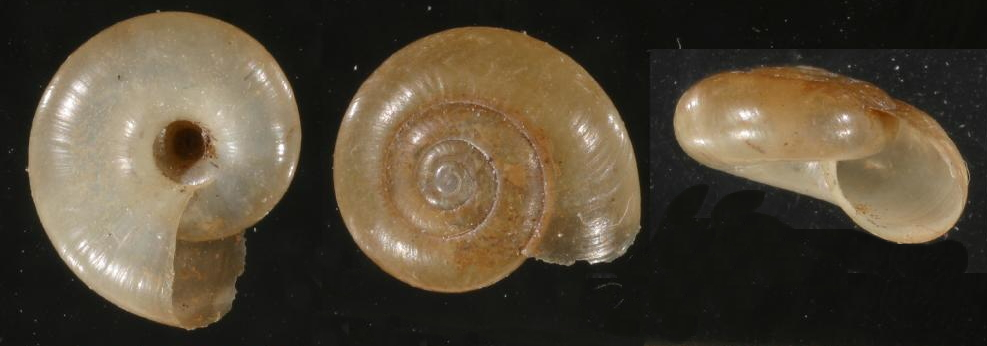
- Shell of Aegopinella graziadei

Scientific classification
- Kingdom: Animalia
- Phylum: Mollusca
- Class: Gastropoda
- Order: Stylommatophora
- Family: Gastrodontidae
- Genus: Aegopinella
- Species: A. graziadei

Binomial name
- Aegopinella graziadei (Boeckel, 1940)
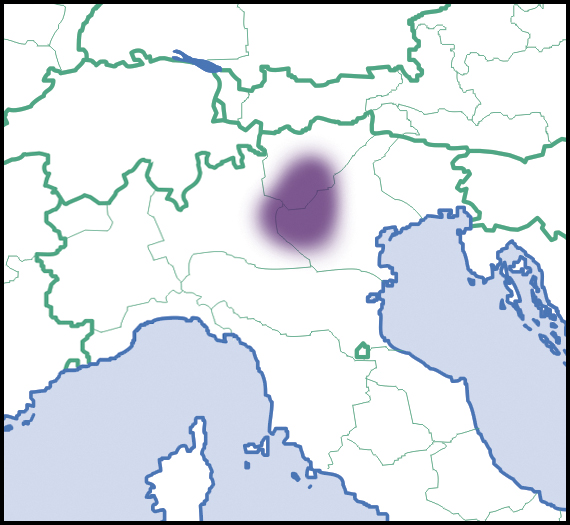

Synonyms
- Retinella graziadei Boeckel, 1940 (original combination)

= Aegopinella graziadei =

Species of gastropod

Aegopinella graziadei is a species of small land snail, a terrestrial pulmonate gastropod mollusk in the family Gastrodontidae, the glass snails.

== Description ==
The diameter of the shell attains 13 mm (0.51 in), its length 7 mm (0.28 in).

== Distribution ==
This species occurs in northern Italy.
