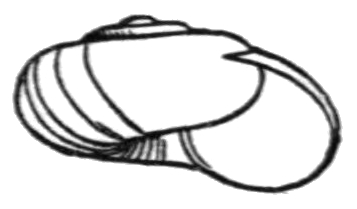
- Drawing of an apertural view of a shell of Nesovitrea binneyana

Conservation status
- Secure (NatureServe)

Scientific classification
- Kingdom: Animalia
- Phylum: Mollusca
- Class: Gastropoda
- Order: Stylommatophora
- Family: Oxychilidae
- Genus: Nesovitrea
- Species: N. binneyana

Binomial name
- Nesovitrea binneyana (E. S. Morse, 1864)

Synonyms
- Vitrea binneyana

= Nesovitrea binneyana =

Species of gastropod

Nesovitrea binneyana, common name the blue glass snail, is a species of air-breathing land snail, a terrestrial pulmonate gastropod mollusk in the family Oxychilidae, the glass snails.

This species is named in honor of the American malacologist William G. Binney. It lives in environments under rocks and logs, with leaf litter present and can be found both inland and in coastal areas.

== Distribution ==
This species occurs in North America.
