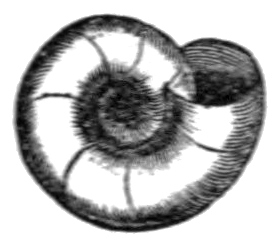
- Engraving of an umbilical view of a shell of Striatura milium

Conservation status
- Secure (NatureServe)

Scientific classification
- Kingdom: Animalia
- Phylum: Mollusca
- Class: Gastropoda
- Order: Stylommatophora
- Family: Gastrodontidae
- Genus: Striatura
- Species: S. milium

Binomial name
- Striatura milium (Whittemore, 1859)

= Striatura milium =

Species of gastropod

Striatura milium, common name the fine-ribbed striate snail, is a species of small air-breathing land snail, a terrestrial pulmonate gastropod mollusk or micromollusk in the family Gastrodontidae.

== Distribution ==
The distribution of Striatura milium includes:

- North America
- The Azores
