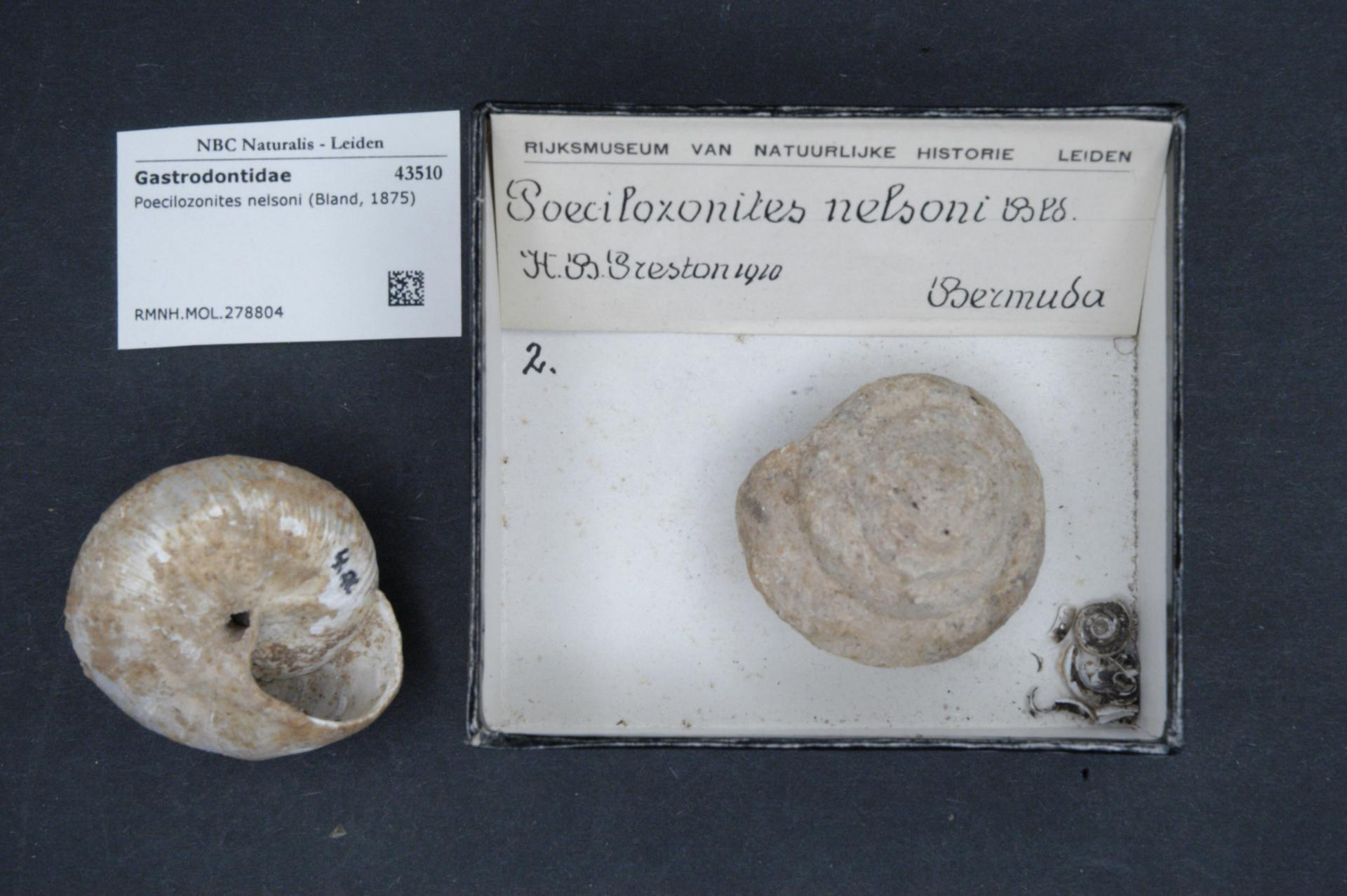
- Preserved specimen of †P. nelsoni at Naturalis Biodiversity Center.

Scientific classification
- Kingdom: Animalia
- Phylum: Mollusca
- Class: Gastropoda
- Order: Stylommatophora
- Family: Gastrodontidae
- Genus: Poecilozonites; O. Boettger, 1884

Species
- See text.

= Bermuda land snail =

Bermuda land snails

Genus of molluscs

Bermuda land snails, scientific name Poecilozonites, are an endemic genus of pulmonate land snail in the family Gastrodontidae (according to the taxonomy of the Gastropoda by Bouchet & Rocroi, 2005). 12 species are known from the fossil record, and 4 of these species (P. bermudensis, P. nelsoni, P. circumfirmatus, P. reinianus) survived into modern times, but due to the highly negative effects of human development, the extant species has been reduced down to only P. bermudensis and P. circumfirmatus.

Scientists believe that Poecilozonites colonised the mid-Atlantic island of Bermuda at least 300,000 years ago. Poecilozonites makes up 95% of Bermuda's terrestrial fossils. Only one other large pulmonate, Succinea, has been found as a fossil.

== Research ==
The major contributor to the natural history of Poecilozonites was Harvard paleontologist Stephen Jay Gould who did his doctorate and early academic research on Bermuda's snails. On December 21, 1999, Dr. Gould described to The Royal Gazette of first visiting Bermuda as a deckhand on a Woods Hole Research Center boat in 1959. "I was a geology major. I had a look around and found all these wonderful fossil snails in all their variety. The geology of Bermuda had already been worked out by then and I thought these snails would become a pretty good PhD."

Poecilozonites is a member of the Gastrodontidae family and is likely to have colonised Bermuda from North America as one specimen via flotsam. Gould cites research which uses the "probability of self-impregnation" as the justification of this view.

Gould claims the proto-poecilozonites "underwent a vigorous and presumably rapid adaptive radiation" and diversified into three subgenera and 15 species, ranging in size from P. nelsoni (max dia. 46 mm) to the subspecies' of P. gastrelasmus and P. discozonites which were found to rarely exceed 5 mm. Although extinction of various species occurred in prehistoric times, with the introduction of predators by man in the 16th century, namely hogs, dogs, cats, and rats, the snail suffered, but has apparently hung on.

It was the introduction of the predator snails Euglandina and Gonaxis in the 1950s and 1960s and the increased use of pesticides that led to the presumed extinction of the surviving Poecilozonites species by the 1970s.

The apparently accidental introduction of the edible snail, Otala in the mid-1920s set the die for the destruction of Poecilozonites as by the 1950s, Otala had become a pest and measures were taken to control their numbers. By the time of Gould's research in the mid-1960s, P. bermudensis and P. circumfirmatus were still common. He wrote of talking to an elderly woman who remembered a time when the shells were collected and burned for lime. By the mid-1970s, a Bermuda Biological Station scientist remembers opening his kitchen door and seeing none other than Gould exclaim "If I could only find one alive!"

In Eight Little Piggies, a book from 1993, Gould wrote: "I don't even think Euglandina has even dented Otala but it devastated the native Poecilozonites. I used to find them by the thousands throughout the Island. When I returned in 1973... I could not find a single animal alive. Last year (1991) I relocated one species, the smallest and most cryptic, but the large P. bermudensis, the major subject of my research, is probably extinct."

(Poecilozonites) are part of a class that are uniquely found on islands. Islands have these strange fauna because of their isolation. Back when I was studying them, we did not know where they came from or their closest relative. That can be done now with genetic research. Poecilozonites had a very impressive radiation in Bermuda. By far one of the largest for a species. It is a wonderful example of an experiment in local evolution. It's just that people did not realise that with the Euglandina, it would eat other snails too. Not just Otala, which by then had become a pest. No one ever said that Poecilozonites ever caused them trouble. It certainly is a tragic story.

— Stephen Jay Gould

In 2002, a Bermuda Aquarium, Museum and Zoo summer intern, Alex Lines, was sent out to Gould's old sites and is understood to have found a clutch of survivors. Several dozen snails were sent to London to aid their propagation.

Poecilozonites circumfirmatus is protected in Bermuda under the Protected Species Act (2003) and a Protected Species Recovery Plan was published for it in 2010 by the Bermuda Government, Department of Conservation Services.

In 2014 it was reported in The Royal Gazette that a live colony of Poecilozonites bermudensi (greater Bermuda land snail) had been found in an overgrown alley in Hamilton. The colony was apparently isolated from the rest of the island, including the effects of invasive species, by colonizing the alley early on. A captive breeding program was carried out at Chester Zoo and the Zoological Society of London in the UK, resulting in the release of more than 4,000 snails into nature reserves on the island by June 2019.

In 2020, Chester Zoo also reintroduced 800 lesser Bermuda land snails to the island, which were thought to have been extinct from the island since 2004. The IUCN Red List considers both extant species to be Critically Endangered, with P. circumfirmatus being possibly extinct in the wild.

== Species ==
Species in the genus Poecilozonites include:

- Subgenus Poecilozonites:
  - Greater Bermuda land snail (Poecilozonites bermudensis)
  - †Poecilozonites cupula
  - †Poecilozonites dalli
  - †Poecilozonites nelsoni
    - †P. n. callosus
    - †P. n. nelsoni
- Subgenus Gastrelasmus:
  - †Poecilozonites acussitimus
  - Lesser Bermuda land snail (Poecilozonites circumfirmatus)
  - †Poecilozonites discrepans
- †Poecilozonites reinianus
