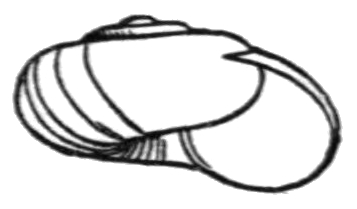
- Apertural view of a shell of Nesovitrea binneyana

Scientific classification
- Kingdom: Animalia
- Phylum: Mollusca
- Class: Gastropoda
- Order: Stylommatophora
- Family: Oxychilidae
- Genus: Nesovitrea; Cooke, 1921

= Nesovitrea =

Nesovitrea binneyana

Genus of gastropods

Nesovitrea is a genus of air-breathing land snails, terrestrial pulmonate gastropod mollusks in the family Oxychilidae, the glass snails.

== Species ==
Species within the genus Nesovitrea include:

- Nesovitrea binneyana
- Nesovitrea dalliana
- Nesovitrea hammonis

Synonyms:

- Nesovitrea electrina (Gould, 1841), accepted as Perpolita electrina (Gould, 1841)

== Distribution ==
This genus occurs in North America.
