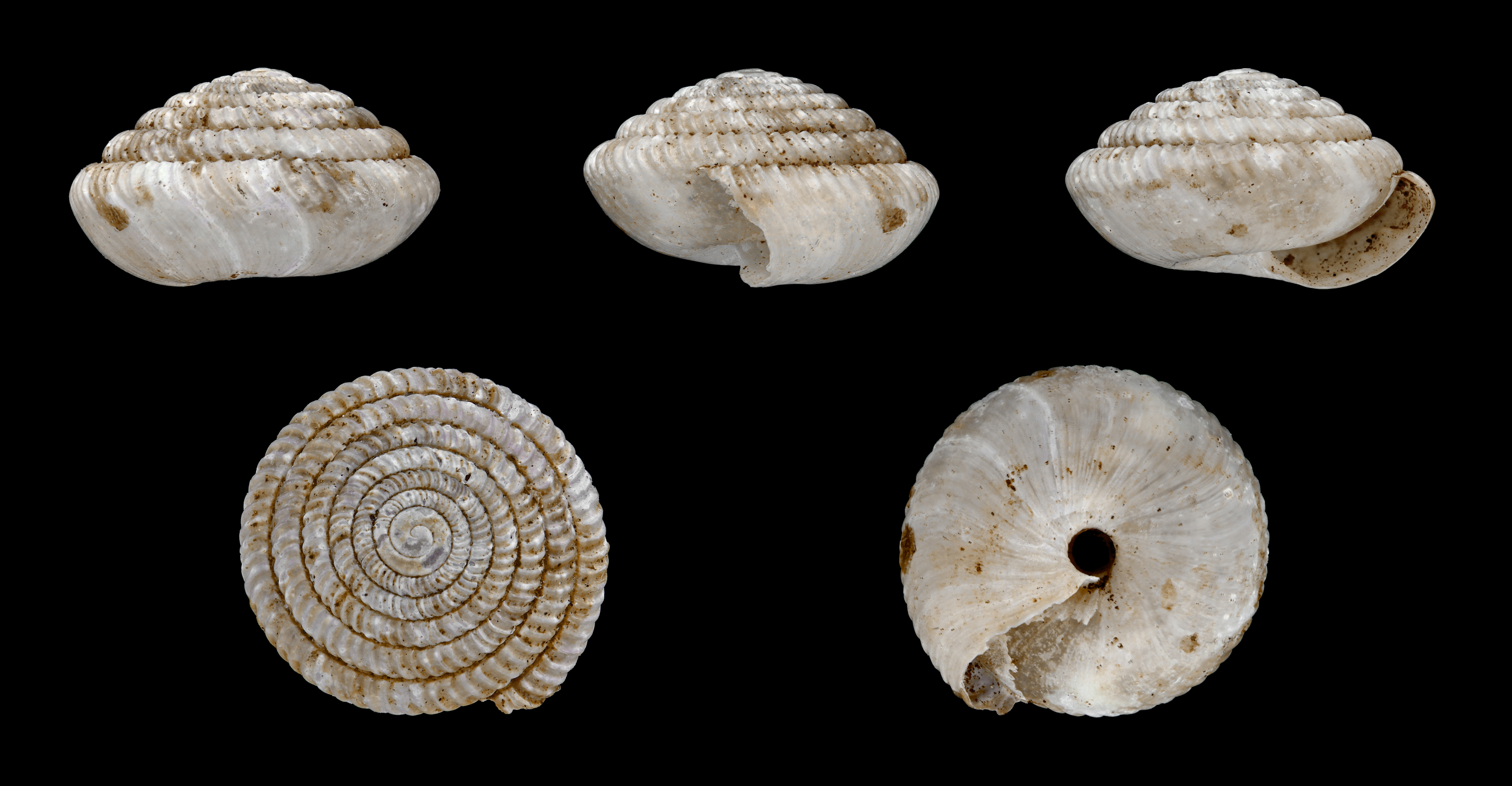
- Janulus stephanophorus (Deshayes, 1850)

Scientific classification
- Kingdom: Animalia
- Phylum: Mollusca
- Class: Gastropoda
- Order: Stylommatophora
- Family: Gastrodontidae
- Genus: Janulus; R.T. Lowe, 1852

= Janulus =

Janulus Temporal range: 13.65–0.0 Ma Miocene to Present

Genus of gastropods

Janulus is a genus of air-breathing land snails, terrestrial pulmonate gastropod mollusks in the family Gastrodontidae.

== Species ==
Species within the genus Janulus include:

- †Janulus angustiumbilicatus (Sacco, 1886)
- †Janulus austriacus Harzhauser & H.Binder, 2004
- Janulus bifrons (R.T.Lowe, 1831)
- †Janulus decorosus W.Yü & X.-Q.Zhang, 1982
- †Janulus densestriatus (Klika, 1891)
- †Janulus gottschicki (Jooss, 1912)
- †Janulus olisipponensis (Roman, 1907)
- Janulus pompylius (Shuttleworth, 1852)
- †Janulus schottleri Wenz, 1922
- †Janulus spadinii Manganelli, Martini & Benocci, 2011
- Janulus stephanophorus (Deshayes, 1850)
- †Janulus supracostatus (F.Sandberger, 1872)
- †Janulus suttonensis (S.V.Wood, 1872)
- Janulus traviesus Castro, Yanes, R.García, M.R.Alonso & Ibáñez, 2014

Species brought into synonymy

- Janulus joossi (Schlickum, 1979): synonym of †Discus pleuradrus (Bourguignat, 1881)

Species inquirenda

- Janulus calathus R. T. Lowe, 1852
- †Janulus disparilis (Deshayes, 1863)
- †Janulus germainae Schlickum & Geissert, 1980
- †Janulus gyrorbis (Klein, 1846)
- †Janulus moersingensis Jooss, 1918
- †Janulus rysa (S. V. Wood, 1848)
- †Janulus striatus (Eichwald, 1830)
