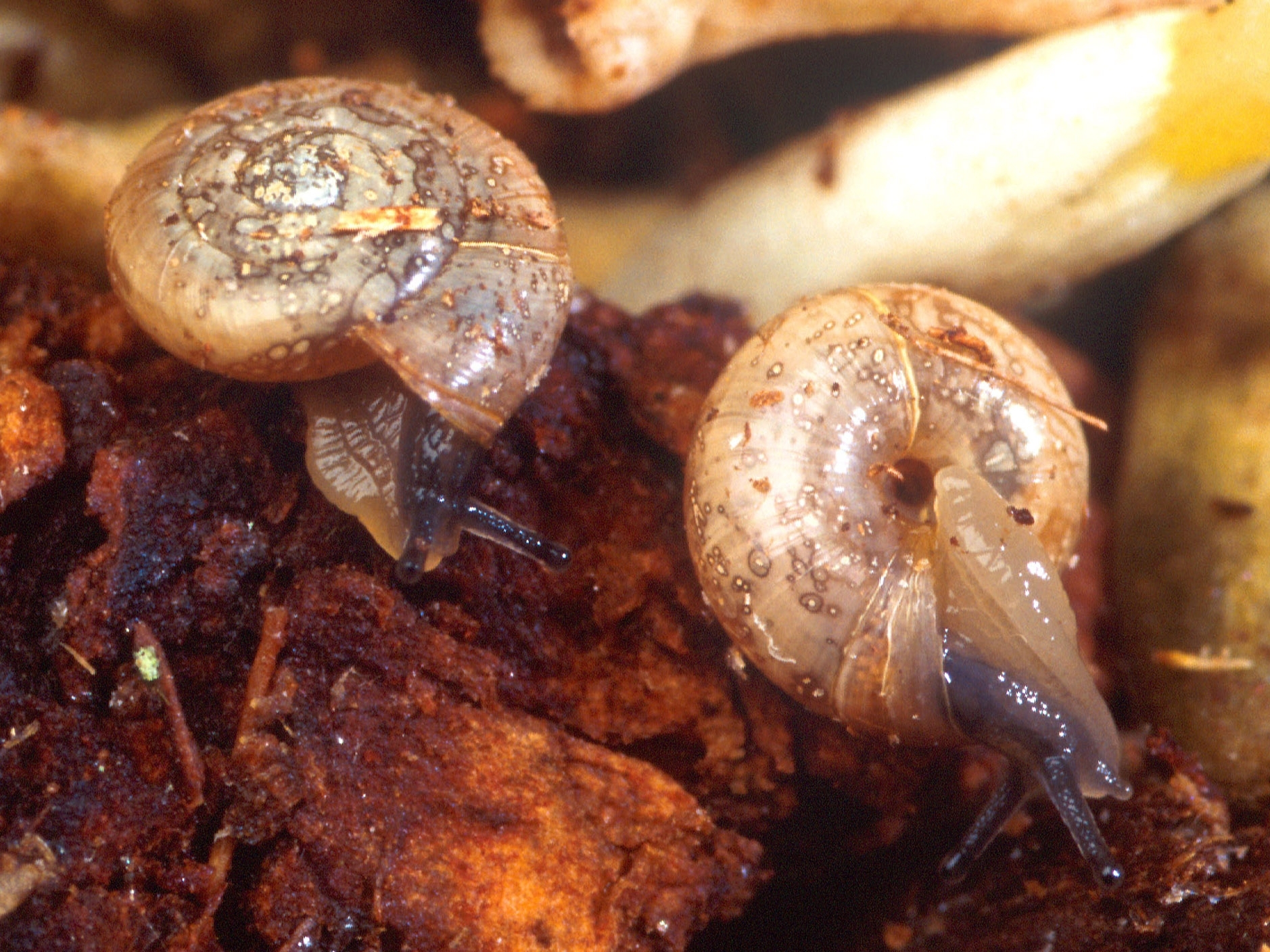
- Two live individuals of Zonitoides arboreus on orchid plants in a greenhouse

Conservation status
- Secure (NatureServe)

Scientific classification
- Kingdom: Animalia
- Phylum: Mollusca
- Class: Gastropoda
- Order: Stylommatophora
- Superfamily: Gastrodontoidea
- Family: Gastrodontidae
- Genus: Zonitoides
- Species: Z. arboreus

Binomial name
- Zonitoides arboreus (Say, 1816)

Synonyms
- Alienitor lyndhurstoides McLaughlin, 1954; Helix arborea Say, 1817 (original combination); Helix arboreus Say, 1817 (original combination, incorrect...); Helix attonis L. Pfeiffer, 1840; Helix breweri Newcomb, 1864; Helix lyndhurstensis J. C. Cox, 1868 junior subjective synonym; Hyalina arborea (Say, 1817) superseded combination; Hyalina arborea var. viridula Cockerell, 1888; Hyalina bryodes (Shuttleworth, 1854) (junior synonym); Hyalina roseni Lindholm, 1911; Hyalinia (Polita) roseni Lindholm, 1911 (a junior synonym); Hyalinia (Polita) roseni f. subrosea Lindholm, 1911 (a junior synonym); Vitrea arborea (Say, 1817) (unaccepted combination); Zonites arboreus (Say, 1817) (unaccepted combination); Zonites bryodes Shuttleworth, 1854 (junior synonym); Zonitoides (Zonitellus) arboreus (Say, 1817); Zonitoides (Zonitellus) azoricus A. Riedel, 1964 (junior synonym); Zonitoides (Zonitoides) arboreus (Say, 1817) alternate representation; Zonitoides arborea [sic] incorrect grammatical agreement of specific epithet; Zonitoides bermudensis Pilsbry & Vanatta, 1909 (junior synonym)

= Zonitoides arboreus =

Species of gastropod

Zonitoides arboreus, commonly known as the quick gloss snail, is a species of small air-breathing land snail, a terrestrial pulmonate gastropod mollusk in the family Gastrodontidae.

== Distribution ==
The native region of Z. arboreus is North America. It is widely distributed in all US states except Nevada. Wind Cave National Park, located in South Dakota, was found to have Z. arboreus in various soil samples. It is widespread and common in central British Columbia, specifically the Peace River-Northern Rockies region.

The non-indigenous distribution includes:

- introduced to Iceland
- Hungary
- Switzerland
- Czech Republic - non-indigenous in Moravia since 2006
- Great Britain - non-indigenous as a "hothouse alien"
- Slovakia - non-indigenous as a "hothouse alien"
- Pratas Island, Taiwan
- New Zealand (North Island, South Island)
- Australia (New South Wales, Queensland, Victoria)
- and other parts of the world

In most cases listed above (but not all of them), this species is a pest found in greenhouses.

== Shell ==
Zonitoides arboreus is a snail with a flattened-heliciform shell, approximately 5–6 mm (0.20-0.24 in) in diameter and 2.4–3 mm (0.09-0.12 in) high. One distinct feature of Z. arboreus is its shell aperture, which is wide and lunate (moon-shaped). The peristome, the margin of the aperture, is thin in this species.

The shell is a depressed helicoid. The first turn of the nuclear whorl is both smooth and noticeably rounded. The remaining turns in the shell are well rounded as well. The surface of the shell is significantly marked by wrinkle-like grooves and lines of growth. Many of these lines are closely spaced, microscopic striations. The spiral striations are coarser than the ones found on the upper surface of the shell.

== Internal anatomy ==
Zonitoides arboreus has gray colored subjacent tissue. The tentacles of the snail are also a deep gray color, while the sides of the feet are a lighter gray. Underneath the tentacles is a pinkish-flesh color and its eyes are black. The mouth connects with the buccal cavity by a thick, large tube. The buccal mass is enclosed in the buccal cavity. Next, the mesh-like esophagus extends forward and makes a turn backwards. This makes the esophagus folded over, such that unfolded it would be twice the length. The esophagus connects with the stomach, which is about three times the size of the esophagus. The intestine moves into two hepatic ducts at its anterior end. The intestine then extends forward to the anterior angle of the esophagus, and is reflected backward and flexed forward into a curve. Within the esophagus, the salivary glands are located in its anterior flexure. The salivary glands aid the snail in digesting complex carbohydrates such as starches in its diet. The hepatopancreas is packed inside the digestive system. The hepatopancreas aids in storing nutrients for tissue regeneration and growth as well. The radula, a structure used for scraping off food and guiding it into the mouth, contains a central rachidian tooth, and five other lateral teeth as well as 18 marginal teeth. These teeth aid the snail in guiding its meals into its mouth for consumption and helps ease the digestion process.

There is also a complex and vital nervous system. The cerebral ganglia are large, and are connected by the cerebral commissure. The cerebral ganglia give rise to the optic, tentacular, and sensory nerves. The two buccal ganglia are small, and connect with the cerebral ganglia by the cerebral buccal commissure and with each other by the buccal commissure. Adjoining the cerebral ganglia is the parietal ganglion, which is about half the size of the right upper pleural ganglion, which lies immediately below it and connects with it. Adjoining the parietal ganglion is the pleural ganglion, which is of about the same size as the upper right pleural ganglion. The left pleural ganglion is about the same size as the right pleural ganglion, and connects with it. Completing the chain of five ganglia is the abdominal ganglion, which is only about one-third the size of the pleural ganglion. The cerebral pleural commissure connects the cerebral ganglion with the pleural ganglion. Below the chain of five ganglia are the two rather large pedal ganglia, which are connected with the cerebral ganglia by the cerebro-pedal commissure.

== Reproduction and life cycle ==
The quick gloss snail goes through a sexual reproductive cycle that starts at the ovotestis, a gonad that shares qualities of both testes and ovaries. This occurs when ovarian tissue and testicular tissue are shared. The ovotestis is a lead-shaped organ that is adjacent to the liver. Attached to the ovotestis is a hermaphroditic duct that is narrow and leads to the accessory gland. The accessory gland aids in the facilitation of sperm transfer. This gland is attached to the albumen gland, an exocrine gland found in snails, which leads to the oviduct. The oviduct is a larger organ that aids in the passage of an egg from the ovotestis. The oviduct is positioned in the posterior of the vagina. The vas deferens of the snail is a cord that is attached to the oviduct and moves into the penis sac. Adjacent to this, is the dart sac, which contains two coronal glands. The vesicula seminalis is a small organ joined to the vagina at about the anterior third by a very long duct. The cloaca is a short thick-walled tube. The dart sac retractor muscle connects the dart sac with the duct of the seminal vesicle at the base of the penis.

== Behavior ==
Zonites arboreus is unable to migrate to other areas because of barriers including large bodies of water, frozen bodies of water, and dry, xeric areas with less than six inches of precipitation. This is because moisture is important for respiration for the species.

== Ecology ==
Z. arboreus is a soil-dwelling snail that feeds on mushrooms and rotting plant matter, playing a role in nutrient recycling.

The habitats frequented by Z. arboreus include forest and woodland areas.

The nematode Parelaphostrongylus tenuis is a parasite of Z. arboreus.

== Invasive species and control ==
The quick gloss snail is often found in greenhouses and natural habitats. Its ability to survive some level of desiccation allows the species to continue to live in the habitat even after attempts to dry out the species. The species becomes primarily invasive for orchid plants, but also can cause harm to other vegetation. This species can also be found in rotting wood and leaf litter. As for the species' ability to move about, Z. arboreus is rather quick compared to other snail species. To locate this species, the defining features are their eye tentacles, which are widely separated with black, bulbous eyes. This species affects fruit and vegetables that are sold in the United States. Since these products are traded internationally, control of Z. arboreus interferes with their production and sale. Currently, the treatment to eliminate this species is methyl bromide fumigation, however this treatment has proven to cause major health and environmental concerns. Irradiation treatment has been introduced as a potential treatment since irradiation hinders this snail from reaching its adult stage. By preventing Z. arboreus from reaching adulthood, irradiation can prevent successful reproduction of snails.
