= William G. Binney =

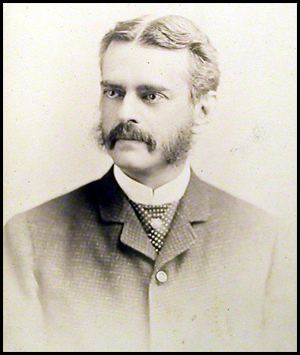
- William G. Binney
- Born: William Greene Binney; October 22, 1833; Boston, Massachusetts, United States
- Died: October 22, 1909 (aged 76); Burlington, New Jersey, United States
- Education: Harvard University
- Spouse: Marie Louise Chamberlain
- Scientific career
- Fields: Malacology, Conchology

William Greene Binney (October 22, 1833 – August 3, 1909) was an American attorney known for his avocation as a malacologist, working mostly during the second half of the nineteenth century. He was responsible for volumes 4 and 5 of The Terrestrial Air-Breathing Mollusks of the United States, a task he took over from his father, Amos Binney, and collaborator, Augustus Addison Gould. The ninety engraved plates which were part of volume 5, illustrating most of the then known land mollusk fauna, are particularly noteworthy.

Binney's obituary in the New York Times included the following information:

Mr. Binney followed in the steps of his father, who was an authority on molluscs. Besides editing his father's works, he prepared for the Smithsonian Institution a work on "The Land and Fresh Water Shells of America" and numerous monographs on the same subject. He was also responsible, in conjunction with Amos Binney, for the collection of North American shells at the Harvard Museum.

== Taxa ==
Taxa named in honor of Binney include:

- Nesovitrea binneyana (E. S. Morse, 1864)

== Bibliography ==
- The terrestrial air-breathing mollusks of the United States, and the adjacent territories of North America
  - Binney W. G. (1859) Volume 4
  - Binney W. G. (July 1878) Volume 5. Plates.
