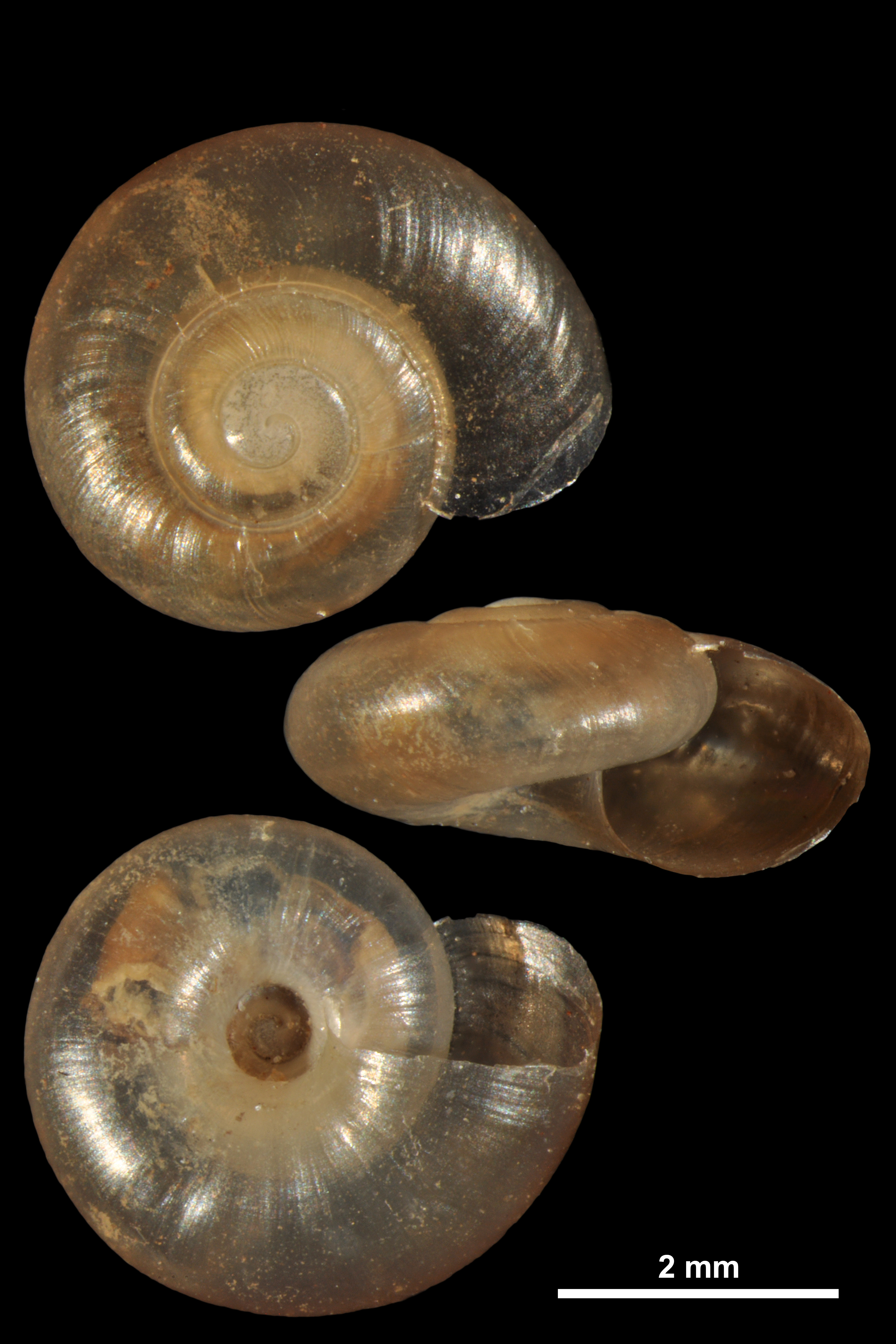

Scientific classification
- Kingdom: Animalia
- Phylum: Mollusca
- Class: Gastropoda
- Order: Stylommatophora
- Family: Gastrodontidae
- Genus: Perpolita
- Species: P. hammonis

Binomial name
- Perpolita hammonis (Strøm, 1765)

Synonyms
- Helix hammonis Strøm, 1765; Helix radiatula Alder, 1830; Retinella radiatula (Adler 1830); Retinella viridula (Menke 1830); Vitrea radiatula (Alder, 1830) (unaccepted combination)

= Perpolita hammonis =

Species of gastropod

Perpolita hammonis is a species of air-breathing land snail, a terrestrial pulmonate gastropod mollusc in the family Gastrodontidae.

== Distribution ==
This species is known to occur in a number of countries and islands including:

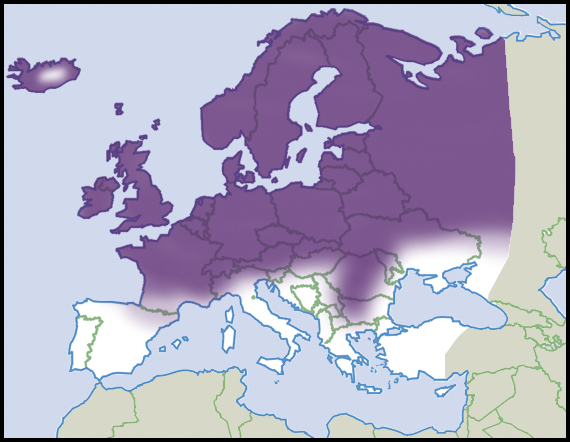
Distribution

- Czech Republic
- Ukraine
- Great Britain
- Ireland
- Malaysia
- and other areas

== Description ==
Perpolita hammonis has a light brown shell with about 3.5 whorls. The shell is shiny with characteristic regular, radial lines. These help as well to distinguish young N. hammonis from other young snails of the families Oxychilidae and Gastrodontidae.

The 1.9-2.1 x 3.6-4.1 mm (0.075-0.083 x 0.142-0.161 in) shell has 3-3.5 whorls. These are usually reddish brown, with regular radial riblets (9-14 riblets per mm, 7-11 riblets per 1/32 in). The umbilicus is open and not deep, and slightly excentric at the last whorl. Fresh shells have very faintly visible spiral lines under high magnification, about 10 spiral lines per radial riblet, 100-150 lines/mm (80-120 lines per 1/32 in). The animal is slender and blackish. The tentacles are black. The foot is narrow, and grey in colour with blackish upper sides and black spots on the sides. The mantle is light grey.

== Habitat ==
The species can live in a wide range of habitats with dry to humid conditions. It can as well tolerate acidic soils. Nesiovitrea hammonis can live in open sites, like meadows, but it generally occurs in wooded habitats and is often found in beech forests.
