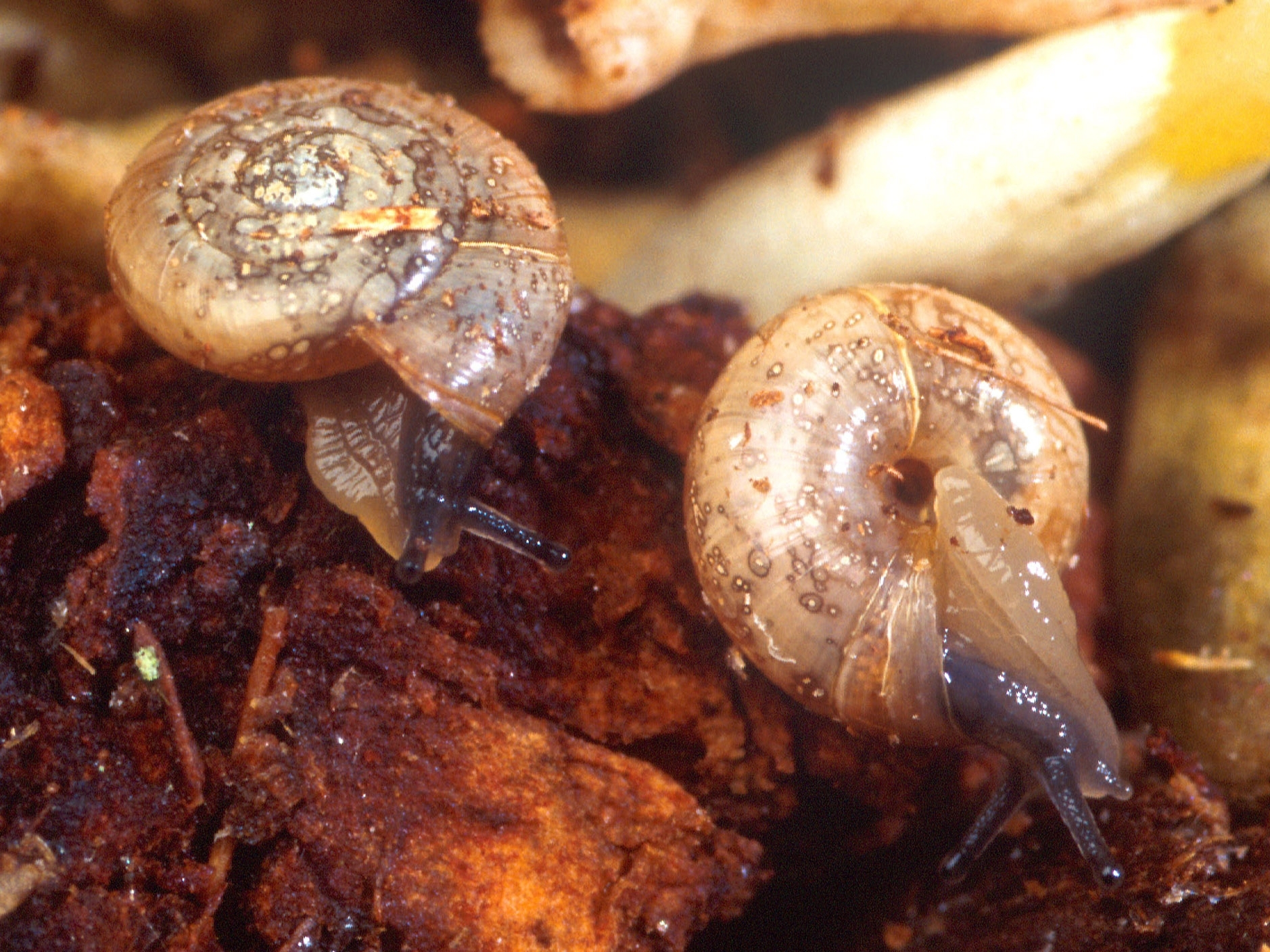
- Two live individuals of Zonitoides arboreus on the roots of orchid plants.

Scientific classification
- Kingdom: Animalia
- Phylum: Mollusca
- Class: Gastropoda
- Order: Stylommatophora
- Infraorder: Limacoidei
- Superfamily: Gastrodontoidea; Tryon, 1866

Families
- See text

= Gastrodontoidea =

Superfamily of gastropods

Gastrodontoidea is a taxonomic superfamily of air-breathing land snails, terrestrial pulmonate gastropod mollusks in the limacoid clade.

== Taxonomy ==
According to the taxonomy of the Gastropoda (Bouchet & Rocroi, 2005), families in this superfamily include:

- Gastrodontidae
- Chronidae
- Euconulidae
- Oxychilidae
- Pristilomatidae
- Trochomorphidae
- Fossil taxa probably belonging to the Gastrodontoidea are:
  - Subfamily † Archaeozonitinae Pfeffer, 1930
    - † Archaeozonites Sandberger, 1873 - type genus of Archaeozonitinae
  - Subfamily † Grandipatulinae Pfeffer, 1930
    - † Grandipatula Cossmann, 1889 - type genus of Grandipatulinae
  - Subfamily † Palaeoxestininae Pfeffer, 1930
    - † Palaeoxestina Wenz, 1919 - type genus of Palaeoxestininae

== Cladogram ==
The following cladogram shows the phylogenic relationships of this superfamily with the other superfamilies and families within the limacoid clade:

- limacoid clade
  - Staffordioidea
    Staffordiidae
  - - - Dyakioidea
        Dyakiidae
      - Gastrodontoidea
        - Pristilomatidae
        - - Chronidae
          - - Euconulidae
            - Trochomorphidae
          - - Gastrodontidae
            - Oxychilidae
    - - Parmacelloidea
        - Trigonochlamydidae
        - Parmacellidae
        - Milacidae
      - - - Zonitoidea
            Zonitidae
          - Helicarionoidea
            - Helicarionidae
            - - Ariophantidae
              - Urocyclidae
        - Limacoidea
          - Vitrinidae
          - - Boettgerillidae
            - - Limacidae
              - Agriolimacidae
