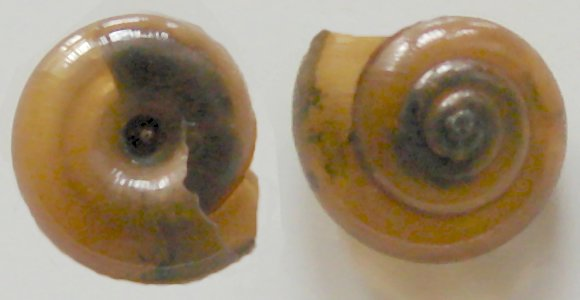
- Two shells of Zonitoides nitidus

Scientific classification
- Kingdom: Animalia
- Phylum: Mollusca
- Class: Gastropoda
- Order: Stylommatophora
- Suborder: Helicina
- Infraorder: Limacoidei
- Superfamily: Gastrodontoidea
- Family: Gastrodontidae; Tryon, 1866

Type genus
- Gastrodonta Tryon, 1866

Genera
- See text

Synonyms
- Gastrodontinae Tryon, 1866 superseded rank; Godwiniinae C. M. Cooke, 1921

= Gastrodontidae =

Gastrodontidae Temporal range: Oligocene–Recent ?Upper Paleocene, Upper Oligocene-Recent

Family of gastropods

Gastrodontidae is a family of air-breathing land snails, terrestrial pulmonate gastropod mollusks in the superfamily Gastrodontoidea (according to the taxonomy of the Gastropoda by Bouchet & Rocroi, 2005).

This family has no subfamilies (according to the taxonomy of the Gastropoda by Bouchet & Rocroi, 2005).

== Distribution ==
The distribution of the Gastrodontidae includes the Nearctic, western-Palearctic, eastern-Palearctic, Neotropical and Hawaii. There are some representatives in Bermuda and Madeira.

== Anatomy ==
Some snail species in this family use love darts made of cartilage.

In this family, the number of haploid chromosomes lies between 26 and 30 (according to the values in this table).

== Genera ==
Genera within the family include:

- Aegopinella Lindholm, 1927
- † Archaegopis Wenz in K. Fischer & Wenz, 1914
- Atlantica Ancey, 1887
- Gastrodonta Albers, 1850
- Glyphyalinia E. von Martens, 1892
- Godwinia Sykes, 1900
- Janulus Lowe, 1852
  - Janulus bifrons (R. T. Lowe, 1831)
  - Janulus pompylius (Shuttleworth, 1852)
  - Janulus stephanophorus (Deshayes, 1850)
- Mesomphix Rafinesque, 1819
- Nesovitrea C. M. Cooke, 1921
- Patulopsis Strebel & Pfeffer, 1879
- Perpolita H. B. Baker, 1928
- Poecilozonites O. Boettger, 1884 - Bermuda land snail
- Pseudohyalina Morse, 1864
- Retinella P. Fischer, 1877
- Striatura E. S. Morse, 1864
  - Striatura milium (Whittemore, 1859)
- Striaturops Baker, 1928
- Ventridens W. G. Binney & Bland, 1869
- † Vermetujanulus Walther & Groh, 2020
- Vermetum Wollaston, 1878
- Vitrinizonites W.G. Binney, 1879
- Zonitoides Lehmann, 1862

Synonyms

- Aegopina Kobelt, 1879: synonym of Retinella P. Fischer, 1877
- Alienitor Iredale, 1937: synonym of Zonitoides Lehmann, 1862 (junior synonym)
- Bermudia Ancey, 1887: synonym of Poecilozonites O. Boettger, 1884
- Edusa Albers, 1860: synonym of Mesomphix (Moreletia) Gray, 1855 represented as Mesomphix Rafinesque, 1819
- Glyphognomon H. B. Baker, 1930: synonym of Glyphyalinia E. von Martens, 1892
- Glyphyaloides H. B. Baker, 1930: synonym of Glyphyalus H. B. Baker, 1928
- Juno Mazyck, 1889: synonym of Poecilozonites O. Boettger, 1884
- Namoitena Iredale, 1933: synonym of Mesomphix (Omphalina) Rafinesque, 1831 represented as Mesomphix Rafinesque, 1819
- Omphalina Rafinesque, 1831: synonym of Mesomphix (Omphalina) Rafinesque, 1831 represented as Mesomphix Rafinesque, 1819 (original rank)
- Politenella Balashov, 2016: synonym of Aegopinella Lindholm, 1927
- Pseudohyalinia [sic]: synonym of Pseudohyalina E. S. Morse, 1864 (misspelling - incorrect subsequent spelling)
- Zonitellus H. B. Baker, 1928: synonym of Zonitoides Lehmann, 1862

== Cladogram ==
A cladogram showing phylogenic relations of families in the limacoid clade:

- limacoid clade
  - Staffordioidea
    Staffordiidae
  - - - Dyakioidea
        Dyakiidae
      - Gastrodontoidea
        - Pristilomatidae
        - - Chronidae
          - - Euconulidae
            - Trochomorphidae
          - - Gastrodontidae
            - Oxychilidae
    - - Parmacelloidea
        - Trigonochlamydidae
        - Parmacellidae
        - Milacidae
      - - - Zonitoidea
            Zonitidae
          - Helicarionoidea
            - Helicarionidae
            - - Ariophantidae
              - Urocyclidae
        - Limacoidea
          - Vitrinidae
          - - Boettgerillidae
            - - Limacidae
              - Agriolimacidae
