= List of non-marine molluscs of Georgia =

Location of Georgia

The non-marine molluscs of the country of Georgia are a part of the molluscan fauna of Georgia.

Summary table of number of species

	Georgia
freshwater gastropods	??
land gastropods	255 species
gastropods altogether	???
bivalves	??
molluscs altogether	???

Georgia lies in the Caucasus ecoregion, that is a biodiversity hotspot. Georgia has majority of Caucasian endemic species of gastropods.

== Freshwater gastropods ==
Lymnaeidae

- Lymnaea stagnalis (Linnaeus, 1758)
- Galba truncatula (O. F. Müller, 1774)
- Stagnicola palustris (O. F. Müller, 1774)
- Ampullaceana lagotis (Schrank, 1803)
- Radix auricularia (Linnaeus, 1758)
- Peregriana peregra (O. F. Müller, 1774)

Physidae

- Aplexa hypnorum (Linnaeus, 1758)

Planorbidae

- Planorbis planorbis (Linnaeus, 1758)
- Planorbis intermixtus Mousson, 1874
- Armiger crista (Linnaeus, 1758)
- Anisus leucostoma (Millet, 1813)
- Anisus spirorbis (Linnaeus, 1758)
- Bathyomphalus contortus (Linnaeus, 1758)
- Ancylus major Issel, 1865
- Ancylus benoitianus Bourguignat, 1862

== Land gastropods ==
Species of land gastropods of Georgia include:

Cyclophoridae

- Caspicyclotus sieversi (L. Pfeiffer, 1871)

Diplommatinidae

- Toffoletia lederi (O. Boettger, 1881)

Aciculidae

- Acicula limbata Reuss, 1860
- Acicula moussoni O. Boettger, 1879

Cochlostomatidae

- Cochlostoma lederi (O. Boettger, 1881)

Pomatiidae

- Pomatias rivularis (Eichwald, 1829)

Ellobiidae

- Carychium minimum O. F. Müller, 1774
- Carychium schlickumi Strauch, 1977
- Carychium tridentatum (Risso, 1826)

Succineidae

- Oxyloma elegans (Risso, 1826)
- Succinea putris (Linnaeus, 1758)
- Succinella oblonga (Draparnaud, 1801)

Cochlicopidae

- Cochlicopa lubrica (O. F. Müller, 1774)
- Cochlicopa lubricella (Rossmässler, 1834)

Orculidae

- Pilorcula aspinosa Hausdorf, 1996
- Pilorcula pusilla Hausdorf, 1996
- Schileykula batumensis (Retowski, 1889)

Pupillidae

- Gibbulinopsis interrupta (Reinhardt in Martens, 1876) or Pupilla interrupta (Reinhardt in Martens, 1876)
- Pupilla signata (Mousson, 1873)
- Pupilla inops (Reinhardt, 1877)
- Pupilla muscorum (Linnaeus, 1758)
- Pupilla triplicata (Studer, 1820)

Chondrinidae

- Chondrina arcadica (Reinhardt, 1881)
- Granopupa granum (Draparnaud, 1801)

Lauriidae

- Euxinolauria caucasica (L. pfeiffer, 1857)
- Euxinolauria glomerosa Suvorov & Schileyko, 1991
- Euxinolauria honesta Suvorov & Schileyko, 1991
- Euxinolauria nemethi (Hausdorf, 1996)
- Euxinolauria paulinae (Lindholm, 1913)
- Euxinolauria pulchra (Retowski, 1883)
- Euxinolauria rectidentata Schileyko, 1975
- Euxinolauria silicea Schileyko, 1975
- Euxinolauria sinangula Schileyko, 1975
- Euxinolauria superstructa (Mousson, 1876)
- Euxinolauria tenuimarginata (Pilsbry, 1922)
- Euxinolauria zonifera (Pilsbry, 1934)

Vertiginidae

- Vertigo sieversi (O. Boettger, 1879)

Enidae

- Adzharia renschi Hesse, 1933
- Akramowskiella andronakii (Lindholm, 1913)
- Akramowskiella umbrosa (Kobelt, 1902)
- Andronakia catenulata (Lindholm, 1914)
- Caucasicola raddei (Kobelt, 1880) / Ena raddei (Kobelt, 1880)
- Chondrula sunzhica Steklov, 1962
- Clausilioides filifer (Lindholm, 1913)
- Euchondrus acutior (Lindholm, 1922)
- Georginapaeus hohenackeri (L. Pfeiffer, 1848)
- Imparietula brevior (Mousson, 1876)
- Improvisa pupoides (Krynicki, 1833)
- Ljudmilena sieversi (Mousson, 1873)
- Ljudmilena tricolis (Mousson, 1876)
- Peristoma boettgeri (Clessin, 1883)
- Peristoma lanceum Schileyko, 1984
- Pseudochondrula lederi (O. Boettger, 1883)
- Pseudochondrula sinistrosa Kokotschashvili & Schileyko, 1984
- Pseudochondrula tetrodon (Mortillet, 1854)
- Pseudochondrula tuberifera (O. Boettger, 1879)
- Retowskia schlaeflii (Mousson, 1863)

Clausiliidae

- Acrotoma baryshnikovi Likharev & Schileyko, 2007
- Acrotoma claussi Nordsieck, 1977
- Acrotoma gegica Suvorov, 2002
- Acrotoma juliae Suvorov, 2002
- Acrotoma komarowi (O. Boettger, 1881)
- Acrotoma laccata (O. Boettger, 1881)
- Armenica gracillima (Retowski, 1889)
- Armenica griseofusca (Mousson, 1676)
- Armenica unicristata (O. Boettger, 1877)
- Caspiophaedusa perlucens (O. Boettger, 1877)
- Elia derasa (Mousson, 1863)
- Elia ossetica (Mousson, 1863)
- Elia somchetica (L. Pfeiffer, 1846)
- Elia tuschetica Likharev et Lezhawa, 1961
- Euxinastra hamata (O. Boettger, 1888)
- Filosa filosa (Mousson, 1863)
- Kazancia lindholm (Kobelt in Lindholm, 1912)
- Mentissoidea rupicola (Mortillet, 1854)
- Micropontica closta (O. Boettger, 1881)
- Mucronaria acuminata (Mousson, 1876)
- Mucronaria duboisi (Chrapentier, 1852)
- Mucronaria index (Mousson, 1863)
- Mucronaria pleuroptychia (O. Boettger, 1878)
- Mucronaria strauchi (O. Boettger, 1878)
- Pontophaedusa funiculum (Mousson, 1856)
- Pravispira semilamellata (Mousson, 1863)
- Quadriplicata aggesta (O. Boettger, 1879)
- Quadriplicata dipolauchen (O. Boettger, 1881)
- Quadriplicata lederi (O. Boettger, 1879)
- Quadriplicata pumiliformis (O. Boettger, 1881)
- Quadriplicata quadriplicata (A. Schmidt, 1868)
- Quadriplicata subaggesta (Retowski, 1887)
- Scrobifera taurica (L. Pfeiffer, 1848)
- Serrulina sieversi Likharev, 1962
- Serrulinella senghanensis (Germain, 1933)
- Strigileuxina lindholmi (Lindholm, 1912)
- Strigileuxina reuleauxi (O. Boettger, 1887)

Spiraxidae

- Poiretia mingrelica (O. Boettger, 1881)

Oxychilidae

- Conulopolita cavatica (Riedel, 1966)
- Conulopolita raddei (O. Boettger, 1879)
- Conulopolita sieversi (O. Boettgeri, 1879)
- Discoxychilus lindholmi Reidel, 1966
- Oxychilus andronakii (Lindholm, 1914)
- Oxychilus birsteini Tzvetkov, 1940
- Oxychilus crenimargo (Retowskii, 1889)
- Oxychilus decipiens (O. Boettger, 1886)
- Oxychilus difficilis (O. Boettger, 1888)
- Oxychilus discrepans (Retowski, 1889)
- Oxychilus duboisi (Charpentier in Mousson, 1863)
- Oxychilus imperator Reidel, 1966
- Oxychilus Koutaisanus (Mousson, 1863)
- Oxychilus lederi (O. Boettger, 1880)
- Oxychilus oschtenicus (O. Boettger, 1888)
- Oxychilus retowskii (Lindholm, 1914)
- Oxychilus suaneticus (O. Boettgeri, 1883)
- Oxychilus sucinaceus (O. Boettger, 1883)
- Daudebardia nivea Schileyko, 1988
- Inguria wagneri (Rosen, 1911)
- Sieversia heydeni (O. Boettger, 1879)
- Szuchumiella jetschini (A. Wagner, 1895)
- Vitrinoxychilus subsuturalis (O. Boettger, 1888)
- Vitrinoxychilus suturalis (O. Boettger, 1881)

Pristilomatidae

- Vitrea contortula (Krynicki, 1837)
- Vitrea praetermissa Reidel, 1988
- Vitrea rhododendronis Reidel, 1966
- Vitrea sorella (Mousson, 1863)

Vitrinidae

- Trochovitrina lederi (O. Boettger, 1879)

Trigonochlamydidae

- Drilolestes retowskii (O. Boettger, 1884)
- Hyrcanolestes velitaris (Martens, 1880)
- Lesticulus nocturnus Schileyko, 1988 - endemic
- Selenochlamys pallida O. Boettger, 1883
- Trigonochlamys imitatrix O. Boettger, 1881

Boettgerillidae

- Boettgerilla compressa Simroth, 1910
- Boettgerilla pallens Simroth, 1912

Milacidae

- Milax caucasicus Simroth, 1912

Agriolimacidae

- Deroceras bakurianum
- Deroceras osseticum (Simroth, 1901)

Limacidae

- Caucasolimax caucasicus (Simroth, 1898)
- Eumilax brandti (Martens, 1880)
- Eumilax intermittens (O. Boettger, 1883)
- Gigantomilax koenigi (Simroth, 1912)
- Gigantomilax lederi (O. Boettger, 1883)
- Gigantomilax monticola (O. Boettger, 1881)
- Metalimax elegans Simroth, 1901
- Metalimax varius (O. Boettger, 1884)

Hygromiidae

- Caucasigena abchasica (Lindholm, 1927)
- Caucasigena armeniaca (L. Pfeiffer, 1846)
- Caucasigena eichwaldi (L. Pfeiffer, 1846)
- Caucasigena rengarteni Lindholm, 1913
- Caucasigena schaposchnikovi Rosen, 1911
- Caucasigena thalestris (Lindholm, 1927)
- Caucasocressa dasilepida (Mabille, 1881)
- Caucasocressa ibera Hausdorf, 2003
- Caucasocressa joannis (Mortillet, 1854)
- Circassina frutis (L. pfeiffer, 1859) - Circassina frutis frutis, Circassina frutis circassica and Circassina frutis veselyi (subgenus Circassina)
- Circassina pachnodes (O. Boettger, 1884)
- Circassina pergranulata Hausdorf, 2001
- Circassina stephaniae (Hudec & Lezhawa, 1970)
- Euomphalia appeliana (Mousson, 1876)
- Euomphalia aristata (Krynicki, 1836)
- Fruticocampylaea kobiensis (O. Boettger, 1883)
- Fruticocampylaea narzanensis (Krynicki, 1836)
- Kalitinaia crenimargo (L. Pfeiffer, 1848)
- Kalitinaia perspectiva Hausdorf, 1993
- Kalitinaia tiflisiana (Lindholm, 1913)
- Kokotschashvilia eberhardi Schileyko, 1978
- Kokotschashvilia holotricha (O. Boettger, 1884)
- Kokotschashvilia makvalae (Hudec & Lezhawa, 1969)
- Kokotschashvilia tanta Schileyko, 1978
- Monacha (Monacha) cartusiana (O. F. Muller, 1774) - introduced
- Monacha (Paratheba) roseni (Hesse, 1914)
- Monacha (Metatheba) perfrequens (Hesse, 1914)
- Monacha (Metatheba) subcarthusiana (Lindholm, 1913)
- Oscarboettgeria euages (O. Boettger, 1883)
- Platytheba mingrelica (Hesse, 1921)
- Platytheba prometheus (O. Boettger, 1883)
- Shileykoia daghestana (Kobelt, 1877)
- Stenomphalia maiae (Hudec & Lezhava, 1969)
- Stenomphalia selecta (Klika, 1894)
- Teberdina flavolimbata (O. Boettger, 1883)

Helicidae

- Caucasotachea atrolabiata (Krynicki, 1833)
- Caucasotachea calligera (Dubois de Montpereux, 1840)
- Helix goderdziana Mumladze, Tarkhnishvili & Pokryszko, 2008
- Helix buchii (Dubios de Montpereux, 1839)
- Helix albescens Rossmässler, 1839
- Helix lucorum Linnaeus, 1758
- Lindholmia christophi (O. Boettger, 1881) / Caucasotachea christophi (O. Boettger, 1881)
- Lindholmia nordmanni (Mousson, 1854) / Caucasotachea nordmanni (Mousson, 1854)

== Bivalvia ==
Sphaeriidae

- Sphaerium corneum (Linnaeus, 1758)
- Musculium lacustre (O. F. Müller, 1774)
- Pisidium casertanum (Poli, 1791)
- Pisidium subtruncatum Malm, 1855
- Pisidium nitidum Jenyns, 1832
- Pisidium obtusale (Lamarck, 1818)

== See also ==
- Freshwater molluscs — all lists and species.
- Lists of freshwater molluscs of surrounding countries:

- List of non-marine molluscs of Iran
- List of non-marine molluscs of Turkey
- List of non-marine molluscs of Azerbaijan
