= List of non-marine molluscs of Iran =

Location of Iran

The non-marine molluscs of Iran are a part of the molluscan fauna of Iran, which is part of the (wildlife of Iran).

Summary table of species in the wild of Iran
Mollusc	Number
Freshwater gastropods	73
Land gastropods	132
Total gastropods	1,055
Marine gastropods	850
Bivalves	??
non-marine molluscs	??

== Freshwater gastropods ==
27 freshwater gastropod species (37% of freshwater gastropod species in Iran) are endemic to Iran.

Species of freshwater gastropods of Iran include:

Neritidae

- Neritina mesopotamica Martens 1879 - the first report in Iran was in 2001
- Neritina cinctellus (Martens, 1874)
- Neritina euphratica Mousson, 1874
- Theodoxus jordani (Sowerby I, 1836)
- Theodoxus major Issel, 1865 - mentioned by Glöer & Pešić (2012) as Theodoxus lituratus (Eichwald, 1838)
- Theodoxus pallidus Dunker, 1861

Viviparidae

- Bellamya bengalensis (Lamarck, 1822)
- Bellamya hilmandensis (Kobelt, 1909)

Melanopsidae

- Melanopsis costata (Olivier, 1804)
- Melanopsis doriae Issel, 1865
- Melanopsis kotschyi Philippi, 1847
- Melanopsis sp. - Mansoorian (2001) listed Melanopsis from Iran as Melanopsis nodosa Mousson, 1874 and as Melanopsis praemorsa (Linnaeus, 1758), but Glöer and Pešić (2012) claimed that there are nine possible names for this species and that further study is necessary to establish under which name or names the Iranian populations should be placed.

Potamididae

- Cerithidea cingulata (Gmelin, 1790)

Thiaridae

- Thiara scabra (O.F. Müller, 1774)
- Melanoides tuberculata (O. F. Müller, 1774)

Bithyniidae

- Bithynia tentaculata (Linnaeus, 1758) - This species most probably does not occur in Iran.
- Bithynia forcarti Glöer & Pešić, 2012
- Bithynia starmuehlneri Glöer & Pešić, 2012
- Bithynia mazandaranensis Glöer & Pešić, 2012
- Bithynia cf. ejecta Mousson, 1874
- Bithynia rubens (Menke, 1830) - questionable taxonomic status
- Bithynia sistanica (Annandale & Prashad, 1919)
- Pseudobithynia irana Glöer & Pešić, 2006
- Pseudobithynia zagrosia Glöer & Pešić, 2009

Cochliopidae

- Heleobia dalmatica (Radoman, 1974)

Hydrobiidae

- Hydrobia acuta (Draparnaud, 1805)
- Ecrobia grimmi (Clessin & Dybowski, 1888)
- Pseudamnicola kotschyi von Frauenfeld, 1863
- Pseudamnicola saboori Glöer & Pešić, 2009
- Pseudamnicola zagrosensis Glöer & Pešić, 2009
- Pseudamnicola raddei Boettger, 1889
- Pseudamnicola georgievi Glöer & Pešić, 2012
- Kaskakia khorrasanensis Glöer & Pešić, 2012
- Sarkhia sarabensis Glöer & Pešić, 2012
- Sarkhia kermanshahensis (Glöer & Pešić, 2009)
- Belgrandiella elburensis (Starmühlner & Edlauer, 1957)
- Hauffenia erythropomatia (Hauffen, 1856)

Moitessieridae

- Trogloiranica tashanica Fatemil, Malek-Hosseini, Falniowski, Hofman, Kuntner & Grego, 2019

Stenothyridae

- Stenothyra arabica Neubert, 1998
- Gangetia uzielliana (Issel, 1866)
- Farsithyra farsensis Glöer & Pešić, 2009

Valvatidae

- Valvata cristata O. F. Müller, 1774
- Valvata piscinalis O. F. Müller, 1774
- Valvata nowshahrensis Glöer & Pešić, 2012

Acroloxidae

- Acroloxus pseudolacustris Glöer & Pešić, 2012

Lymnaeidae

- Radix persica (Issel, 1865)
- Radix auricularia (Linnaeus, 1785) - Radix auricularia gedrosiana Annandale & Prashad, 1919
- Radix bactriana (Annandale & Prashad, 1919)
- Radix iranica (Annandale & Prashad, 1919)
- Radix gedrosiana (Annandale & Prashad, 1919) - Radix gedrosiana gedrosiana (Annandale & Prashad, 1919). Radix gedrosiana rectilabrum is endemic to Iran.
- Radix hordeum (Mousson, 1874)
- Radix labiata (Rossmaessler, 1835)
- Galba truncatula (Müller, 1774)
- Galba schirazensis Küster, 1862
- Stagnicola sp. - Most probably, the species reported from Iran as Stagnicola palustris represents an undescribed species. It is not possible to identify or eventually describe this species according to shells only as new to science without anatomical studies.
- Lymnaea stagnalis (Linnaeus, 1774)

Doubtful Lymnaeidae:

- Radix lagotis (Schrank, 1803) - It was recorded from Iran by Martens (1874) and by Biggs (1937), but this species most probably does not occur in Iran.

Planorbidae

- Bulinus truncatus (Audouin, 1827)
- Planorbis intermixtus Mousson, 1874
- Planorbis carinatus O. F. Müller, 1774
- Anisus leucostoma (Millet, 1813)
- Anisus spirorbis (Linnaeus, 1758)
- Anisus sp. - shells similar to Anisus vorticulus
- Anisus vortex (Linnaeus, 1758)
- Gyraulus piscinarum (Bourguignat, 1852)
- Gyraulus euphraticus (Mousson, 1874)
- Gyraulus convexiusculus (Hutton, 1849)
- Gyraulus laevis (Alder, 1838)
- Indoplanorbis exustus (Deshayes, 1834)
- Hippeutis complanatus (Linnaeus, 1758) - the first report in Iran was in 2012
- Segmentina calatha (Benson, 1850)
- Ferrissia isseli (Bourguignat, 1866)

Physidae

- Physella acuta (Draparnaud, 1805)

Freshwater species excluded from the list:

- Theodoxus fluviatilis (Linnaeus, 1758) - It was listed by Glöer & Pešić (2012) from Iran. But Sands et al. (2012) found no evidence for the occurrence of this species.
- Bithynia badiella (Küster, 1852)
- Bithynia troschelii (Pasch, 1842)
- Acroloxus lacustris (Linnaeus, 1758) - It was recorded by Lothar Forcart in 1935. But an analysis of the two specimens from Forcart's collection (NMB 11516a) identified as Acroloxus lacustris from Mazandaran Province shows that these specimens belong to Acroloxus pseudolacustris.

== Land gastropods ==
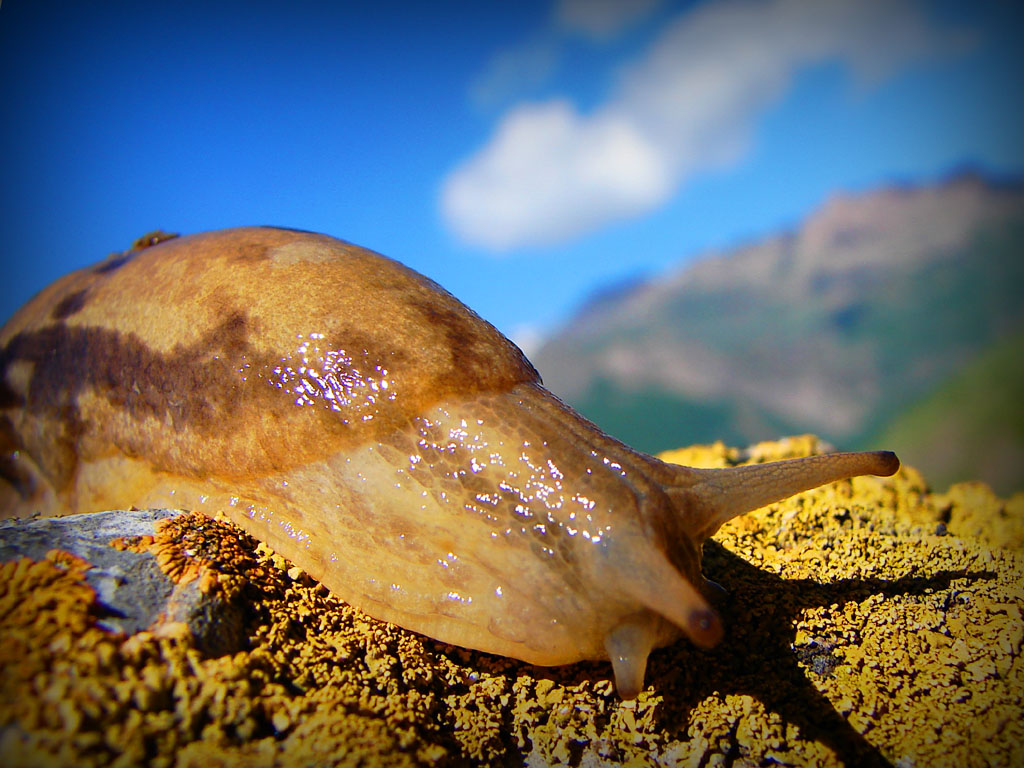
An unidentified gastropod from Iran

Species of land gastropods of Iran include:

Aciculidae

- Acicula persica Subai, 1981

Cyclophoridae

- Caspicyclotus sieversi (L. Pfeiffer, 1871)

Pomatiidae

- Pomatias rivularis hyrcanus (E. von Martens, 1874)

Carychiidae

- Carychium lederi O. Boettger, 1880
- Carychium minimum O. Boettger, 1880

Succineidae

- Oxyloma "pfeifferi"
- Succinea putris (Linnaeus, 1758)

Cochlicopidae

- Cochlicopa lubrica (O.F. Müller, 1774)

Enidae

- Buliminus alepensis (L. Pfeiffer, 1842)
- Buliminus zarudnyi Lindholm, 1915
- Chondrula tridens (O.F. Müller, 1774)
- Geminula continens carmanica (Forcart, 1959)
- Geminula continens continens (Rosen, 1892)
- Geminula continens parthica (Forcart, 1959)
- Geminula didymodus (O. Boettger, 1880)
- Geminula dolmenensis Bank & Neubert, 2016
- Geminula ghilanensis (Issel, 1865)
- Geminula isseliana (Bourguignat, 1865)
- Geminula pyramidata Bank & Neubert, 2016
- Geminula urmiensis Bank & Neubert, 2016
- Georginapaeus hohenackeri (L. Pfeiffer, 1848)
- Iranopsis carducha (E. von Martens, 1874)
- Iranopsis granulata Bank & Neubert, 2016
- Ljudmilena sieversi (Mousson, 1873)
- Merdigera obscura (O.F. Müller, 1774)
- Multidentula pupoides (Krynicki, 183)
- Multidentula ridens (Nägele, 1906)
- Ottorosenia varenzovi (Rosen, 1893)
- Pseudochondrula arsaci Bank & Neubert, 2016
- Pseudochondrula bondouxi Bank & Neubert, 2016
- Pseudochondrula darii Bank & Neubert, 2016
- Pseudochondrula orientalis Bank & Neubert, 2016
- Pseudochondrula purus Bank & Neubert, 2016
- Pseudochondrula seductilis scapa Bank & Neubert, 2016
- Pseudochondrula tetrodon Bank & Neubert, 2016
- Pseudonapaeus alborsicus Bank & Neubert, 2016
- Pseudonapaeus asterabadensis (Kobelt, 1880)
- Pseudonapaeus blanfordianus (Kobelt, 1880)
- Pseudonapaeus demorgani Bank & Neubert, 2016
- Pseudonapaeus fusiformis Bank & Neubert, 2016
- Pseudonapaeus geoffreyi (Ancey, 1884)
- Pseudonapaeus hyrcanus (Lindholm, 1915)
- Pseudonapaeus ignoratus Bank & Neubert, 2016
- Pseudonapaeus kermanensis Bank & Neubert, 2016
- Pseudonapaeus menkhorsti Bank & Neubert, 2016
- Pseudonapaeus minutus Bank & Neubert, 2016
- Pseudonapaeus orculoides Bank & Neubert, 2016
- Pseudonapaeus schahrudensis (O. Boettger, 1889)
- Pseudonapaeus sogdianus (E. von Martens, 1874)
- Turanena herzi (O. Boettger, 1889)
- Turanena pseudobscura Bank & Neubert, 2016

Chondrinidae

- Granopupa granum (Draparnaud, 1801)
- Granopupa persica (Gittenberger, 1973)

Gastrocoptidae

- Gastrocopta armigerella (Reinhardt, 1877)

Lauriidae

- Lauria cylindracea (Da Costa, 1778)
- Leiostyla iranica Gittenberger & Pieper, 1988

Orculidae

- Orculella pfeiferi Hausdorf, 1996
- Orculella ruderalis persica Hausdorf, 1996
- Orculella sirianocoriensis libanotica (Tristram, 1865)
- Pagodulina lederi hyrcanica Gittenberger & Pieper, 1984
- Pagodulina lederi lederi Gittenberger & Pieper, 1984
- Schileykula scyphus crassa (Pilsbry, 1922)
- Sphyradium doliolum Hausdorf, 1996

Pupillidae

- Pupoides coenopictus (T. Hutton, 1834)

Truncatellinidae

- Truncatellina callicratis (Scacchi, 1833)

Valloniidae

- Vallonia costata (O.F. Müller, 1774)
- Vallonia pulchella (O.F. Müller, 1774)

Vertiginidae

- Vertigo angustior Jeffreys, 1830
- Vertigo antivertigo (Draparnaud, 1801)
- Vertigo pygmaea (Draparnaud, 1801)

Clausiliidae

- Euxina achrafensis Nordsieck, 1995
- Caspiophaedusa perlucens gilanensis Nordsieck, 1978
- Caspiophaedusa perlucens perlucens (O. Boettger, 1877)
- Euxina forcarti Nordsieck, 1995
- Euxina gastron Nordsieck, 1995
- Euxina lessonae (Issel, 1865)
- Euxina mazanderanica Nordsieck, 1995
- Euxina patrisnemethi Németh & Szekeres, 2004
- Euxina talyschana Likharev, 1962
- Laeviphaedusa hyrcanica (Germain, 1933)
- Likharevia gilanensis Nordsieck, 1995
- Microphaedusa morgani Nordsieck, 1978
- Mucronaria duboisi (Charpentier, 1852)
- Pravispira semilamellata (Mousson, 1863)
- Serrulina sieversi (L. Pfeiffer, 1871)
- Serrulinella senghanensis (Germain, 1933)

Achatinidae

- Cecilioides acicula (O.F. Müller, 1774)
- Cecilioides raddei (O. Boettger, 1879)
- Zootecus insularis (Ehrenberg, 1831)

Punctidae

- Punctum pygmaeum (Draparnaud, 1801)

Gastrodontidae

- Zonitoides nitidus (O.F. Müller, 1774)

Oxychilidae

- Aegopinella pura (Alder, 1830)
- Conulopolita sieversi (O. Boettger, 1879)
- Eopolita derbentina (O. Boettger, 1886)
- Gastranodon siaretanus (O. Boettger, 1889)
- Iranoxychilus herzi (O. Boettger, 1889)
- Oxychilus caspius caspius (O. Boettger, 1800)
- Oxychilus caspius disciformis Riedel, 1959
- Oxychilus concinnus (Krynicki, 1836)
- Oxychilus filicum (Krynicki, 1836)
- Oxychilus hobbit Riedel, 1981
- Oxychilus patulaeformis (O. Boettger, 1889)
- Oxychilus subeffusus (O. Boettger, 1879)
- Perpolita petronella (L. Pfeiffer, 1853)
- Schistophallus elegans (O. Boettger, 1881)
- Schistophallus hyrcanus (Riedel, 1981)

Pristilomatidae

- Vitrea contortula (Krynicki, 1837)
- Vitrea morgani Riedel, 1966
- Vitrea pygmaea (O. Boettger, 1880)
- Vitrea saboori Neubert & Bössneck, 2013

Parmacellidae

- Parmacella ibera (Draparnaud, 1801)

Trigonochlamydidae

- Hyrcanolestes velitaris (Martens, 1880)
- Parmacellilla filipowitschi Simroth, 1910

Agriolimacidae

- Deroceras spec. cf. bakurianum (Simroth, 1912)
- Deroceras caucasicum (Simroth, 1901)
- Krynickillus melanocephalus Kaleniczenko, 1851
- Lytopelte maculata (Koch et Heynemann, 1874)

Limacidae

- Caspilimax keyserlingi (E. von Martens, 1880)

Vitrinidae

- Oligolimax annularis (S. Studer, 1820)

Geomitridae

- Helicopsis aelleni Hausdorf, 1996
- Helicopsis persica Hausdorf & Bössneck, 2016
- Xeropicta krynickii (Krynicki, 1833)

Helicidae

- Caucasotachea leucoranea (Mousson, 1863)
- Eobania vermiculata (O.F. Müller, 1774)
- Helix lucorum Linnaeus, 1758
- Helix salomonica Nägele, 1899
- Levantina ceratomma (L. Pfeiffer, 1856)
- Levantina djulfensis (Dubois de Montpéreux, 1840)
- Levantina ghilanica (Mousson, 1876)
- Levantina mahanica (Kobelt, 1910)
- Levantina mazenderanensis (Kobelt, 1883)

Hygromiidae

- Diplobursa pisiformis (L. Pfeiffer, 1846)
- Harmozica ravergiensis (Férussac, 1835)
- Monacha obstructa (L. Pfeiffer, 1842)
- Monacha syriaca (Ehrenberg, 1831)
- Stenomphalia selecta (Klika, 1894)

== Freshwater bivalves ==
Species of freshwater bivalves of Iran include:

== See also ==
- List of marine molluscs of Iran

Lists of molluscs of surrounding countries:

- List of non-marine molluscs of Armenia
- List of non-marine molluscs of Azerbaijan
- List of non-marine molluscs of Turkmenistan
- List of non-marine molluscs of Kazakhstan
- List of non-marine molluscs of Russia
- List of non-marine molluscs of Afghanistan
- List of non-marine molluscs of Pakistan
- List of non-marine molluscs of Iraq
- List of non-marine molluscs of Turkey
