= List of non-marine molluscs of Armenia =

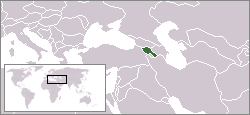
Location of Armenia

The non-marine molluscs of Armenia are a part of the molluscan fauna of Armenia (wildlife of Armenia). A number of species of non-marine molluscs are found in the wild in Armenia.

== Freshwater gastropods ==
Hydrobiidae

- Nicolaia schniebsae Glöer, Bößneck, Walther & Neiber, 2015
- Shadinia akramowskii (Zhadin, 1952)
- Shadinia bjniensis Glöer, Bößneck, Walther & Neiber, 2015
- Shadinia terpoghassiani (Akramowski, 1952)

Valvatidae

- Valvata armeniaca Glöer & Walther, 2019

== Land gastropods ==
Pomatiidae

- Pomatias rivularis (Eichwald, 1829)

Carychiidae

- Carychium minimum O.F.Müller, 1774

Succineidae

- Succinella oblonga (Draparnaud, 1801)
- Oxyloma elegans (Risso, 1826)
- Oxyloma sarsii (Esmark, 1886)

Cochlicopidae

- Cochlicopa lubrica (O.F.Müller, 1774)
- Cochlicopa lubricella (Porro, 1838)

Orculidae

- Orculella ruderalis Akramowski, 1947
- Sphyradium doliolum (Bruguière, 1792)

Lauriidae

- Lauria cylindracea (Da Costa, 1778)

Valloniidae

- Acanthinula aculeata (O.F.Müller, 1774)
- Vallonia costata (O.F.Müller, 1774)
- Vallonia pulchella (O.F.Müller, 1774)

Pupillidae

- Pupilla bipapulata Akramowski, 1947
- Pupilla inops (Reinhardt, 1877)
- Pupilla kyrostriata Walther & Hausdorf, 2014
- Pupilla muscorum (Linnaeus, 1758)
- Pupilla triplicata (Studer, 1820)
- Gibbulinopsis interrupta (Reinhardt, 1876)
- Gibbulinopsis signata (Mousson, 1873)

Vertiginidae

- Vertigo antivertigo (Draparnaud, 1801)
- Vertigo moulinsiana (Dupuy, 1849)
- Vertigo nitidula (Mousson, 1876)
- Columella columella (Martens, 1830)
- Columella edentula (Draparnaud, 1805)
- Truncatellina callicratis (Scacchi, 1833)
- Truncatellina costulata (Nilsson, 1822)
- Truncatellina cylindrica (Férussac, 1807)

Chondrinidae

- Chondrina granum (Draparnaud, 1801)

Pyramidulidae

- Pyramidula pusilla (Vallot, 1801)

Enidae

- Akramovskiella schuschaensis (Kobelt, 1902)
- Geminula isseliana (Bourguignat in Issel, 1865)
- Imparietula brevior (Mousson, 1876)
- Ljudmilena sieversi (Mousson, 1873)
- Merdigera obscura (O.F.Müller, 1774)
- Pseudochondrula tetrodon (Mortillet, 1854)
- Chondrula cf. sunzhica Steklov, 1962
- Chondrula tridens (O.F.Müller, 1774)
- Georginapaeus hohenackeri (L.Pfeiffer, 1848)
- Improvisa pupoides (Krynicki, 1833)

Clausiliidae

- Caspiophaedusa perlucens (O.Boettger, 1877)
- Akramowskia akramowskii (Likharev, 1962)
- Akramowskia valentini (Loosjes, 1964)
- Armenica disjuncta armenica Nordsieck, 1977
- Armenica likharevi Nordsieck, 1975
- Armenica narineae Gevorgyan & Egorov, 2020
- Armenica unicristata (O. Boettger, 1877)
- Elia derasa (Mousson, 1863)
- Mentissoidea rupicola (Mortillet, 1854)
- Scrobifera taurica (L.Pfeiffer, 1848)
- Mucronaria duboisi (Charpentier, 1852)
- Quadriplicata quadriplicata (A.Schmidt, 1868)

Ferussaciidae

- Cecilioides acicula (O.F.Müller, 1774)

Punctidae

- Punctum pygmaeum (Draparnaud, 1801)

Discidae

- Discus ruderatus (Férussac, 1821)

Pristilomatidae

- Vitrea contortula (Krynicki, 1837)
- Vitrea pygmaea (O.Boettger, 1880)

Oxychilidae

- Conulopolita sieversi (O.Boettger, 1879)
- Perpolita petronella (L.Pfeiffer, 1853)
- Eopolita derbentina (O.Boettger, 1886)
- Oxychilus cf. filicum (Krynicki, 1836)
- Oxychilus koutaisanus koutaisanus (Mousson, 1863)
- Oxychilus koutaisanus mingrelicus (Mousson, 1863)
- Oxychilus subeffusus (O.Boettger, 1879)

Vitrinidae

- Vitrina pellucida (O.F.Müller, 1774)
- Phenacolimax annularis (Studer, 1820)

Gastrodontidae

- Aegopinella pura (Alder, 1830)
- Zonitoides nitidus (O.F.Müller, 1774)

Euconulidae

- Euconulus fulvus (O.F.Müller, 1774)

Agriolimacidae

- Deroceras agreste (Linnaeus, 1758)
- Deroceras reticulatum (O.F.Müller, 1774)
- Deroceras caucasicum (Simroth, 1901)
- Krynickillus melanocephalus Kaleniczenko, 1851

Limacidae

- Gigantomilax brunneus (Simroth, 1901)
- Gigantomilax daghestanus (Simroth, 1898)
- Gigantomilax monticola armeniacus (Simroth, 1886)
- Limacus flavus Linnaeus, 1758
- Limacus maculatus (Kaleniczenko, 1851)

Trigonochlamydidae

- Hyrcanolestes velitaris (Martens, 1880)
- Trigonochlamys imitatrix O.Boettger, 1881

Parmacellidae

- Parmacella ibera Eichwald, 1841

Helicidae

- Levantina djulfensis (Dubois de Montpéreux, 1840)
- Levantina escheriana (Bourguignat, 1864)
- Helix albescens Rossmässler, 1839
- Helix lucorum Linnaeus, 1758

Hygromiidae

- Xeropicta derbentina (Krynicki, 1836)
- Kalitinaia crenimargo (L. Pfeiffer, 1848)
- Stenomphalia selecta (Klika, 1894)
- Stenomphalia pisiformis (L.Pfeiffer, 1846)
- Stenomphalia ravergiensis (Férussac, 1835)
- Monacha fruticola (Krynicki, 1833)
- Harmozica zangezurica Gural-Sverlova, Amiryan & Gural, 2017

== See also ==
Lists of molluscs of surrounding countries:

- List of non-marine molluscs of Georgia
- List of non-marine molluscs of Azerbaijan
- List of non-marine molluscs of Iran
- List of non-marine molluscs of Turkey
