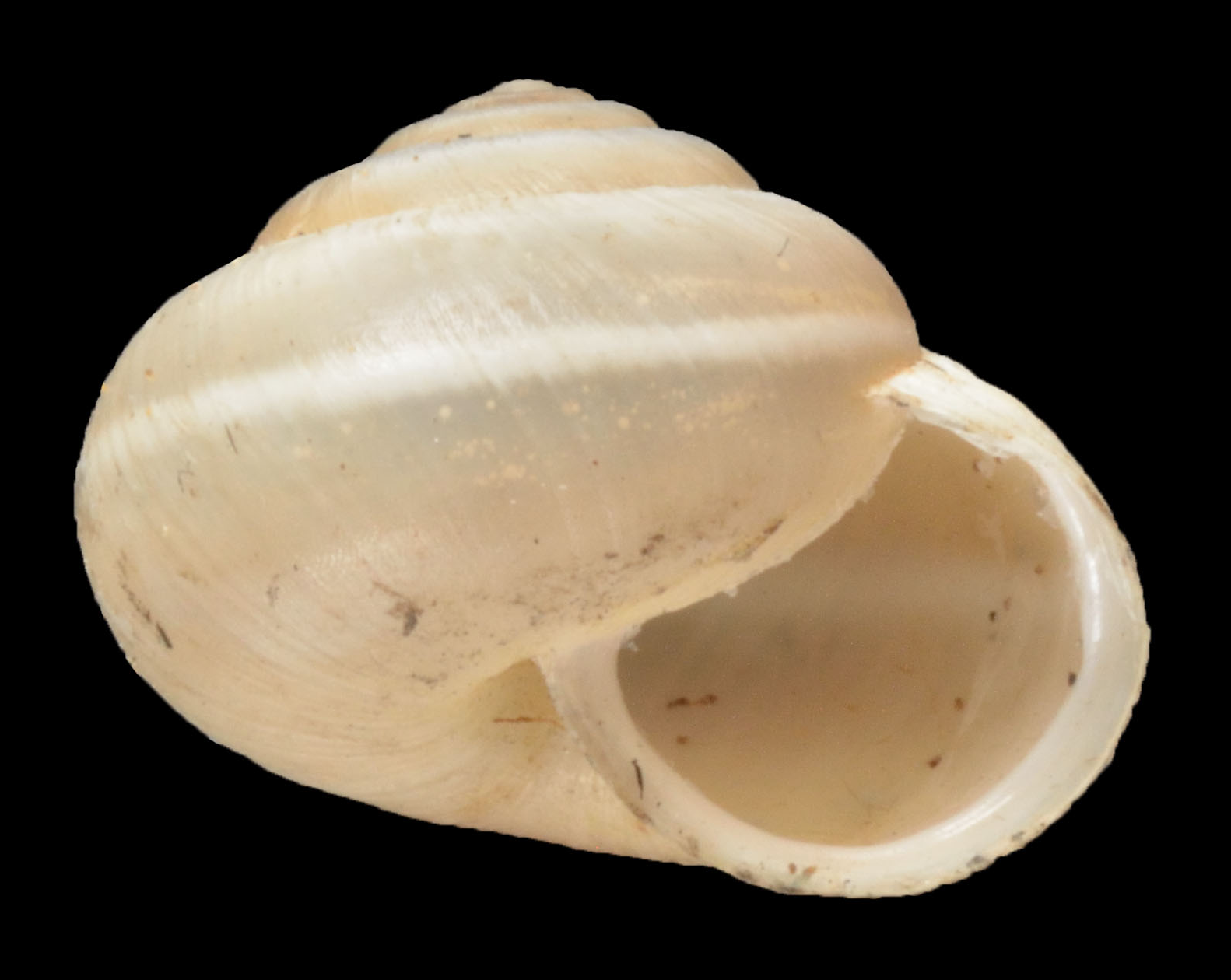
- Apertual view of a shell of Harmozica ravergiensis. Width of the shell is 12 mm.

Scientific classification
- Kingdom: Animalia
- Phylum: Mollusca
- Class: Gastropoda
- Order: Stylommatophora
- Family: Hygromiidae
- Genus: Harmozica
- Species: H. ravergiensis

Binomial name
- Harmozica ravergiensis (Férussac, 1835)

Synonyms
- Helix ravergiensis Férussac, 1835

= Harmozica ravergiensis =

Species of gastropod

Harmozica ravergiensis is a species of an air-breathing land snail, a terrestrial pulmonate gastropod mollusk in the family Hygromiidae, the hairy snails and their allies.

This is the type species of the genus Harmozica.

The specific name ravergiensis is in honour of Mr. M. Ravergie.

== Distribution ==
The distribution of this species is Caucasian and countries include:

- probably non-native in Ukraine.
  - southeastern Ukraine in Dnipropetrovsk Oblast and Donetsk Oblast since 2006
  - western Ukraine
- Armenia
- Azerbaijan
- Georgia
- Russia

The type locality is "Caucasus".

== Description ==
The shape of the shell of Harmozica ravergiensis is globose.

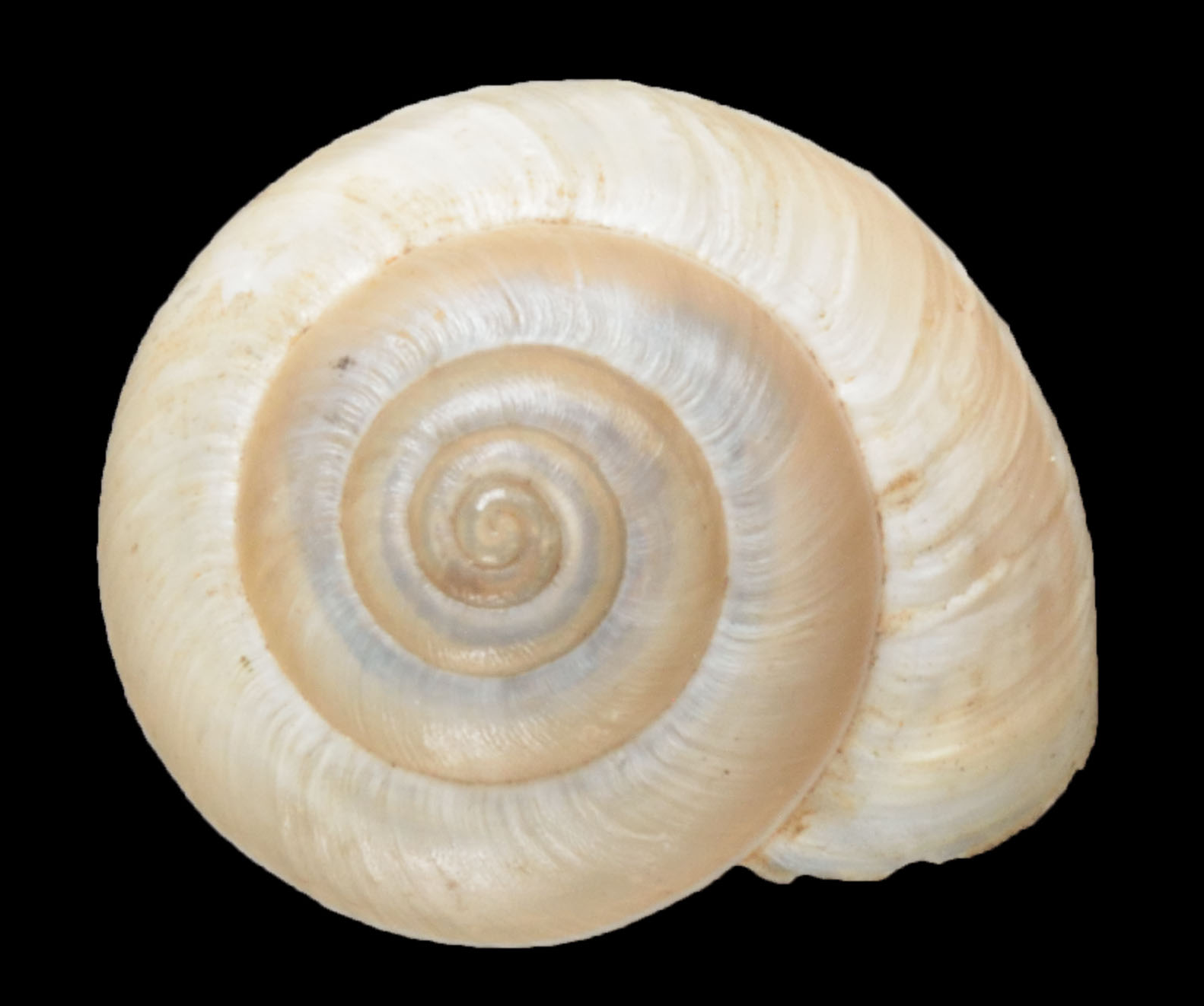
Apical view of a shell.

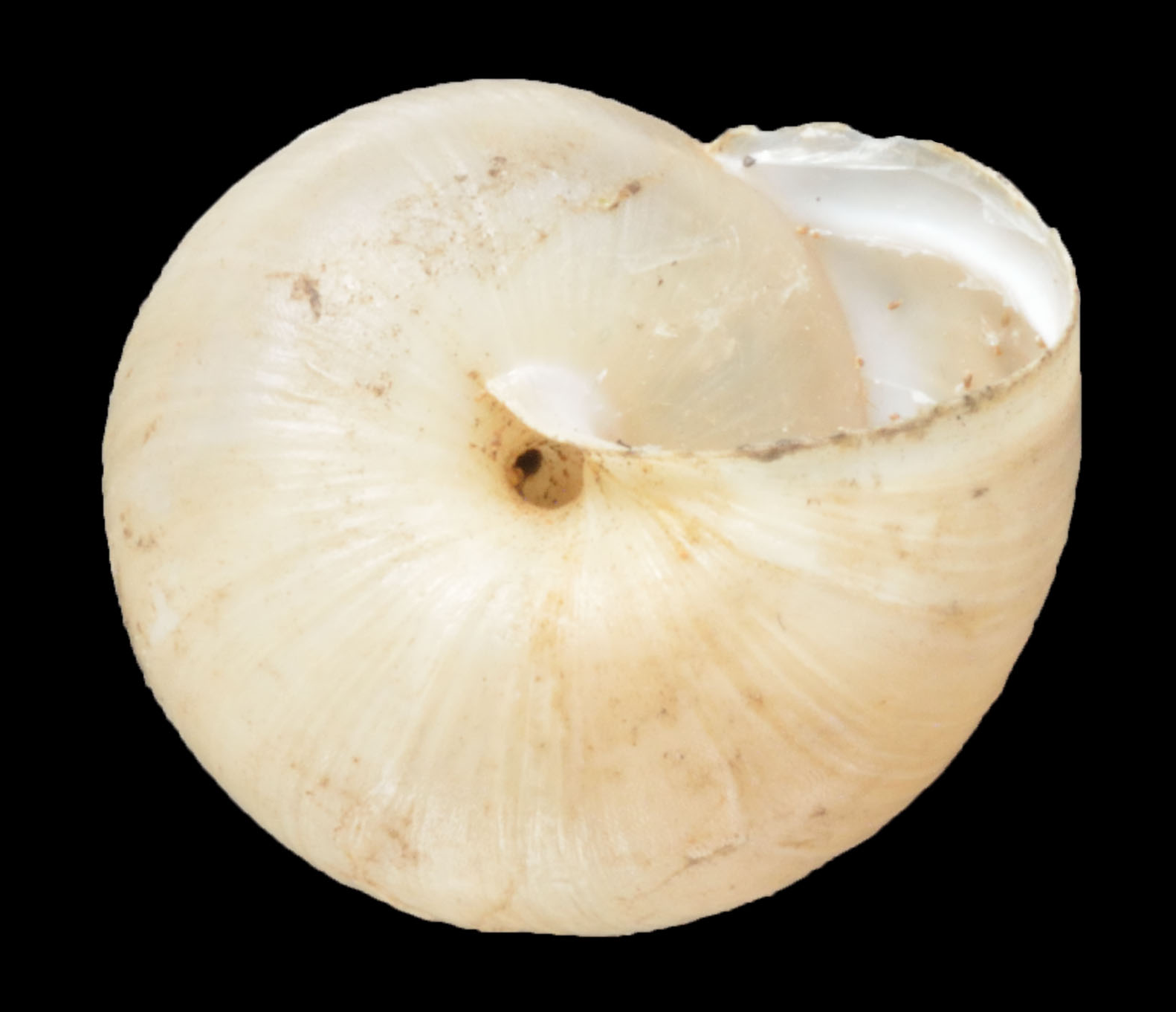
Umbilical view of a shell.
