= Trigonochlamys imitatrix =

Scientific classification
- Kingdom: Animalia
- Phylum: Mollusca
- Class: Gastropoda
- Order: Stylommatophora
- Family: Trigonochlamydidae
- Genus: Trigonochlamys
- Species: T. imitatrix

Binomial name
- Trigonochlamys imitatrix O. Boettger, 1881

Synonyms
- Phrixolestes ponticus Simroth, 1902; Trigonochlamys (Phrixolestes) ponticus Simroth, 1912; Trigonochlamys (Trigonochlamys) imitatrix O. Boettger, 1881; Trigonochlamys armeniaca Simroth, 1912; Trigonochlamys distans Simroth, 1912; Trigonochlamys minor Simroth, 1902; Trigonochlamys pontica Simroth, 1912

Species of gastropod

Trigonochlamys imitatrix is a species of predatory air-breathing land slug. It is a shell-less pulmonate gastropod mollusc in the family Trigonochlamydidae.

== Distribution ==
The distribution of Trigonochlamys imitatrix includes:

- Georgia
- Armenia
- Azerbaijan
- north-eastern Turkey (Vilayet Çoruh)

The type locality is Kutaisi, Georgia.

== Description ==
The size of preserved specimens is 33–62 mm. Live individuals are larger.

== Ecology ==
Trigonochlamys imitatrix inhabits forests.
