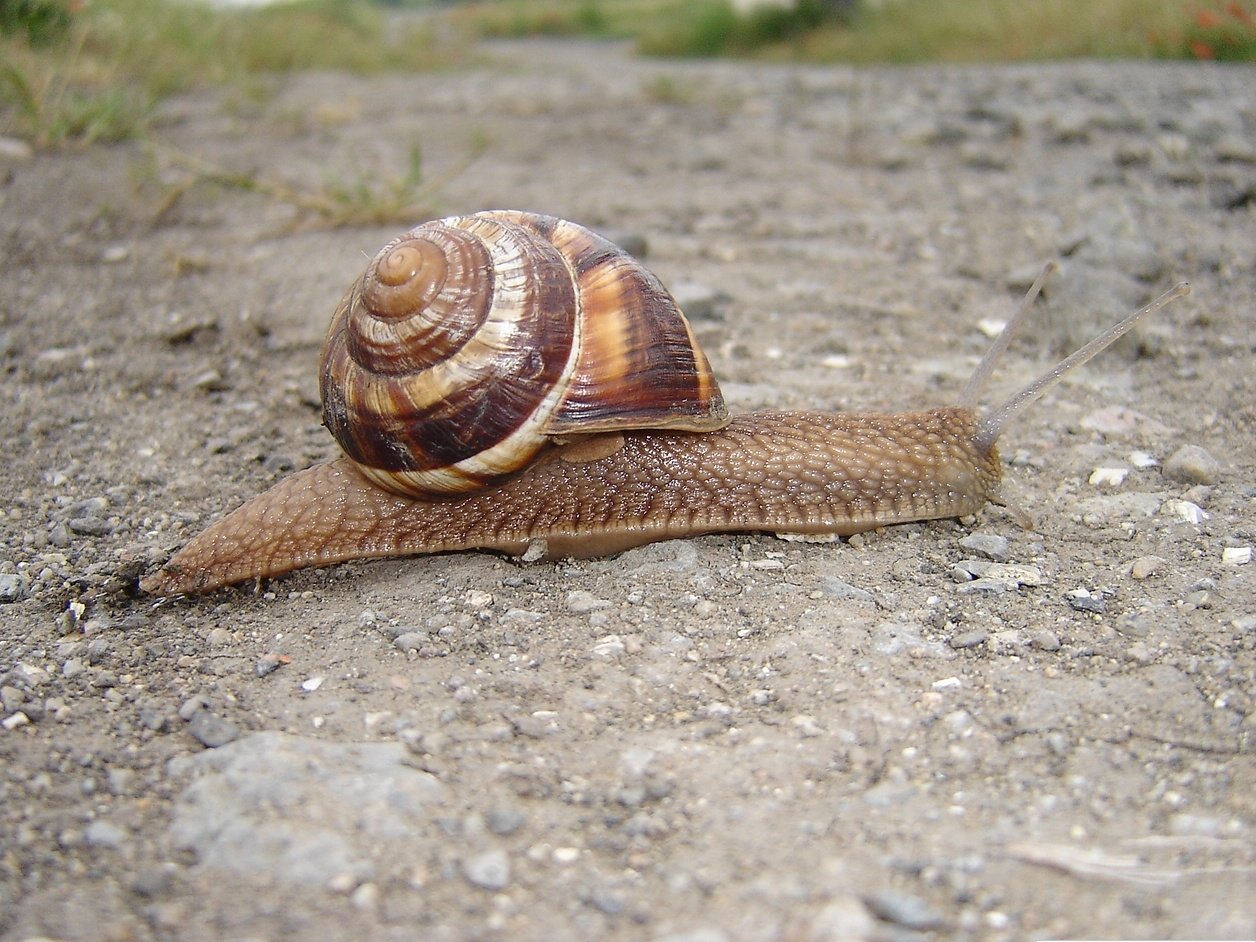

Scientific classification
- Kingdom: Animalia
- Phylum: Mollusca
- Class: Gastropoda
- Order: Stylommatophora
- Family: Helicidae
- Subfamily: Helicinae
- Tribe: Helicini
- Genus: Helix
- Species: H. lucorum

Binomial name
- Helix lucorum Linnaeus, 1758

Synonyms
- List: Helix (Helicogena) ancyrensis Kobelt, 1905 (junior synonym); Helix (Helicogena) ancyrensis haussknechti Kobelt, 1905 (junior synonym); Helix (Helicogena) everekensis Kobelt, 1907 (junior synonym); Helix (Helicogena) halepensis Kobelt, 1905 (junior synonym); Helix (Helicogena) quinquefasciata Kobelt, 1905 (junior synonym); Helix (Helix) lucorum Linnaeus, 1758· accepted, alternate representation; Helix (Pomatia) dorylaeensis Kobelt, 1903 (junior synonym); Helix (Pomatia) dorylaensis Nägele, 1903 (suspected synonym); Helix annosa Mascarini, 1892; Helix atrocincta Bourguignat, 1883; Helix castanea Olivier, 1801 (invalid; not O. F. Müller, 1774); Helix castanea var. bulgarica Kobelt, 1905 (junior synonym); Helix castanea var. nigerrima Kobelt, 1905 (junior synonym); Helix lucorum anaphora Westerlund, 1889; Helix lucorum hueti Kobelt, 1905 (junior synonym); Helix lucorum loebbeckei Kobelt, 1905 (junior synonym); Helix lucorum moussoni Kobelt, 1905 (invalid; not L. Pfeiffer, 1849); Helix lucorum var. euphratica E. von Martens, 1874 (junior synonym); Helix mahometana Bourguignat, 1860 (junior synonym); Helix mutata Lamarck, 1822 (junior synonym); Helix nigrozonata Bourguignat, 1883; Helix onixiomicra Bourguignat, 1860 (junior synonym); Helix onixiomicra var. presbensis Kobelt, 1905 (junior synonym); Helix radiosa Rossmässler, 1838 (junior synonym); Helix rumelica var. magnifica Kobelt, 1905 (junior synonym); Helix rypara Bourguignat, 1883; Helix schachbulakensis Bourguignat, 1876 (junior synonym); Helix socia L. Pfeiffer, 1853 (junior synonym); Helix taurica Krynicki, 1833; Helix virago Bourguignat, 1883

= Helix lucorum =

Species of gastropod

Helix lucorum, known commonly as the Turkish Snail, is a species of large, edible, air-breathing land snail, a terrestrial pulmonate gastropod mollusk in the family Helicidae, the typical snails.

== Description ==
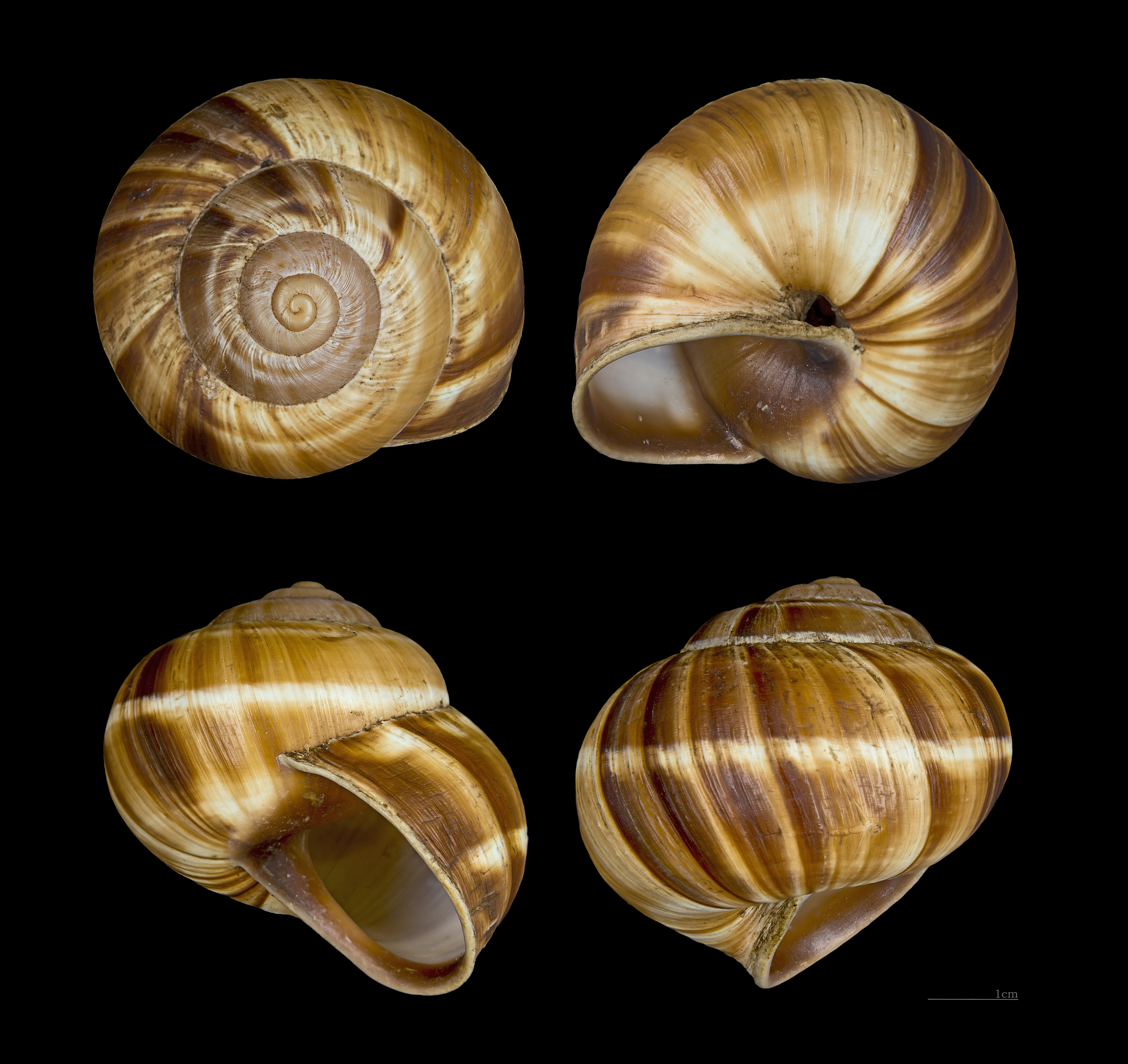
The shell of Helix lucorum

var. boettgeri

Adult snails weigh about 20–25 g.

The width of the shell is 35–60 mm. The height of the shell is 25–45 mm.

This species of snail makes and uses love darts.

== Distribution ==
The native distribution is the Caucasus, Anatolia and, arguably, the Balkans. It has also invaded many other regions since ancient times, likely assisted by humans.

Eastern native range with main genetic diversity of the species:

- Anatolia (Turkey)
- Georgia
- Azerbaijan
- Armenia
- Northern Iran

Balkans:

- Albania
- Bosnia and Herzegovina
- Bulgaria
- Croatia
- Greece
- Macedonia
- Serbia
- Turkey

Other countries:

- Israel
- Syria
- China - invasive
- Russia - could be native in Caucasus, invasive in some other regions
- Italy - probably invasive
- Hungary - probably invasive
- Romania - probably invasive
- Ukraine - invasive, in Crimea ("Helix taurica Krynicki, 1833") at least since early 19 century, probably much longer, these populations originated from Anatolia; other colonies of a different lineage also appear since 2000s in mainland part of Southern Ukraine and in Crimea as well
- Czech Republic - invasive, since 2009, as of 2011 the only locality is Prague-Žižkov
- Slovakia - invasive, since 2013, as of 2014 the only locality is in Bratislava
- France - invasive
- Great Britain - invasive, since 2009, at Wimbledon

== Ecology ==
The diameter of the egg is 4.4 mm. Juvenile snails that are two to three months old weigh 0.5–0.9 g.

== Human use ==
Measurement of DNA damage in H. lucorum collected from environmental sites can be used for evaluating soil pollution at these sites. DNA damage in H. lucorum haemocytes and digestive gland cells is determined by the comet assay.

Helix lucorum is used in cuisine as escargots.

Helix lucorum (raw)
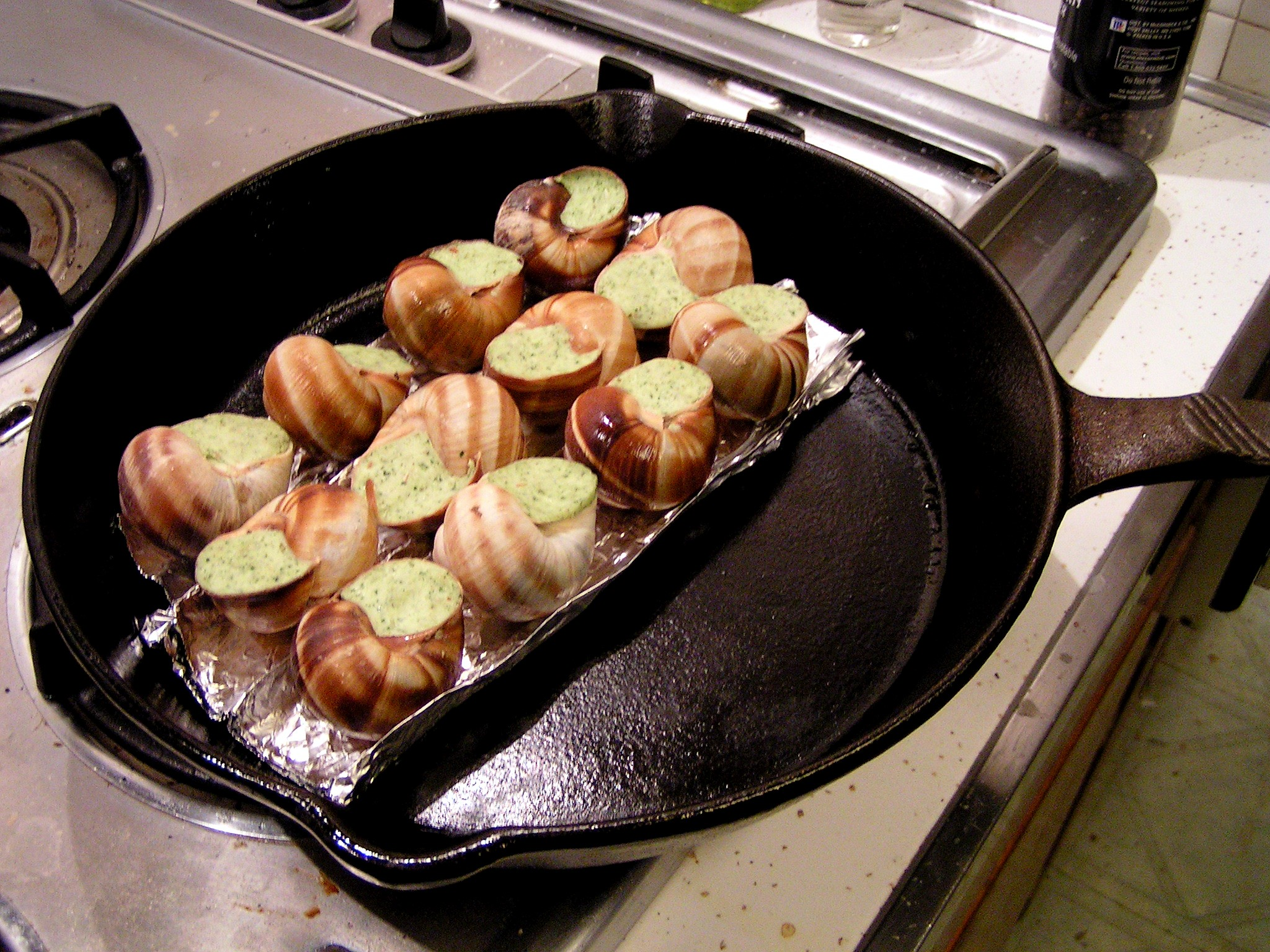
- Helix lucorum served as escargots

Nutritional value per 100 g (3.5 oz)
- Energy: 95 kcal (400 kJ)
- Carbohydrates: 0 g
- Sugars: 0 g
- Dietary fiber: 0 g
- Fat: 1.59 g
- Saturated: 0 g
- Trans: 0 g
- Protein: 19.05 g
Vitamins and minerals
Vitamins	Quantity %DV^{†}
Vitamin A equiv.	0% 0 μg
Vitamin C	0% 0 mg
Minerals	Quantity %DV^{†}
Calcium	12% 159 mg
Iron	13% 2.29 mg
Sodium	4% 103 mg
- Other constituents: Quantity
- Cholesterol: 206 mg
- Full Link to USDA Database entry
- ^{†}Percentages estimated using US recommendations for adults.
