= Boreolestes =

Scientific classification
- Kingdom: Animalia
- Phylum: Mollusca
- Class: Gastropoda
- Order: Stylommatophora
- Family: Trigonochlamydidae
- Subfamily: Trigonochlamydinae
- Genus: Boreolestes; Schileyko & Kijashko, 1999

Genus of molluscs

Boreolestes is a genus of predatory air-breathing land slugs, shell-less pulmonate gastropod molluscs in the family Trigonochlamydidae.

The generic name Boreolestes contains the suffix -lestes, that means "robber".

== Species ==
There are two species within the genus Boreolestes and they include:

- Boreolestes likharevi Schileyko & Kijashko, 1999 - type species
- Boreolestes sylvestris Kijashko in Schileyko & Kijashko, 1999
