= Carychium hachijoensis =

Scientific classification
- Kingdom: Animalia
- Phylum: Mollusca
- Class: Gastropoda
- Order: Ellobiida
- Family: Ellobiidae
- Genus: Carychium
- Species: C. hachijoensis

Binomial name
- Carychium hachijoensis Pilsbry, 1902

Species of gastropod

Carychium hachijoensis is a species of very small air-breathing land snail, a terrestrial pulmonate gastropod mollusk in the family Ellobiidae. The distribution of Carychium minimum is at East-Asia, including Japan and Taiwan. The snail usually lives under fallen leaves.
