= Lesticulus nocturnus =

Scientific classification
- Kingdom: Animalia
- Phylum: Mollusca
- Class: Gastropoda
- Order: Stylommatophora
- Family: Trigonochlamydidae
- Subfamily: Trigonochlamydinae
- Genus: Lesticulus; Schileyko, 1988
- Species: L. nocturnus

Binomial name
- Lesticulus nocturnus Schileyko, 1988

Species of gastropod

Lesticulus nocturnus is a species of predatory air-breathing land slug. It is a shell-less pulmonate gastropod mollusc in the family Trigonochlamydidae.

L. nocturnus is the only species in the genus Lesticulus.

== Distribution ==
The distribution of L. nocturnus includes only its type locality.

The type locality of L. nocturnus is the Oficho Cave near Kumistavi village, near Tzkhaltubo, western Georgia.

== Ecology ==
L. nocturnus inhabits the cave.
