= Helix goderdziana =

Scientific classification
- Kingdom: Animalia
- Phylum: Mollusca
- Class: Gastropoda
- Order: Stylommatophora
- Family: Helicidae
- Genus: Helix
- Species: H. goderdziana

Binomial name
- Helix goderdziana Mumladze, Tarkhnishvili & Pokryszko, 2008

Species of gastropod

Helix goderdziana is a species of large air-breathing land snail, a terrestrial pulmonate gastropod mollusk in the family Helicidae, the typical snails.

This is the largest species in the genus Helix.

== Distribution ==
This species occurs in the Lesser Caucasus in southwestern Georgia Takes its name from the Goderdzi Pass where it originates. It is the largest non-tropical Eurasian land snail. Presents a 68 mm diameter shell, larger than any other species in the genus, a pale yellowish-brown foot, and shorter glands.

== Biotope ==
This snail lives in humid mountain forests.
