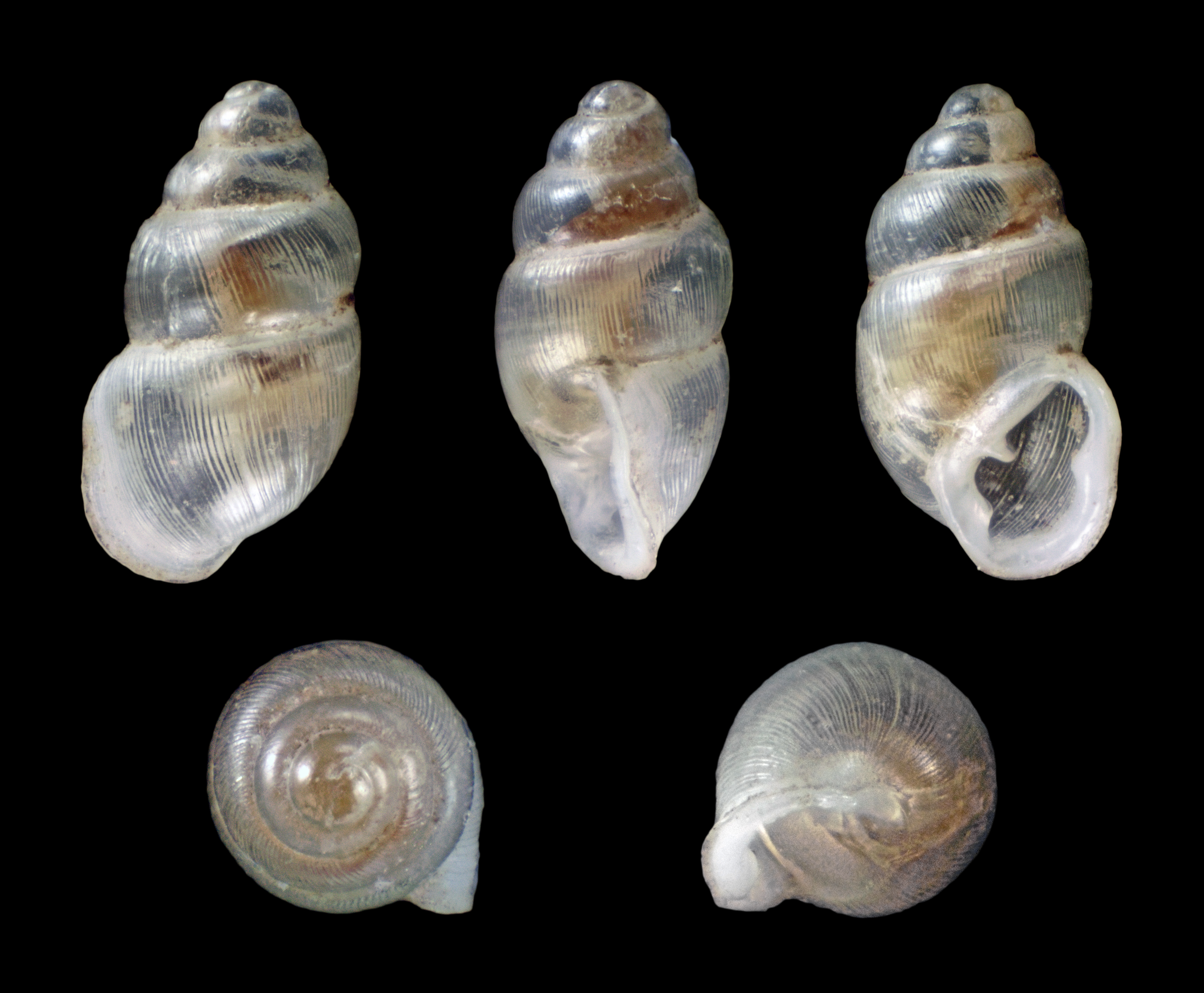
- Shell of Carychium minimum

Conservation status
- Secure (NatureServe)

Scientific classification
- Kingdom: Animalia
- Phylum: Mollusca
- Class: Gastropoda
- Order: Ellobiida
- Family: Ellobiidae
- Genus: Carychium
- Species: C. minimum

Binomial name
- Carychium minimum Müller, 1774

Synonyms
- Carychium ovatum Sandberger, 1880

= Carychium minimum =

Species of gastropod

Carychium minimum is a species of very small air-breathing land snail, a terrestrial pulmonate gastropod mollusk in the family Ellobiidae.

== Description ==
The width of the shell is 0.9-1.1 mm. The height of the shell is 1.6-2.2 mm. It is wider than the shell of Carychium tridentatum which it closely resembles. As in C. tridentatum shell is dull white and cylindrical and the mouth is oval with two denticles and a thickened lip. However if the last whorl above the aperture is opened this shows the plica parietalis (a spiral ridge on the parietal region projecting into the interior of the shell) descending in a simple way downwards.

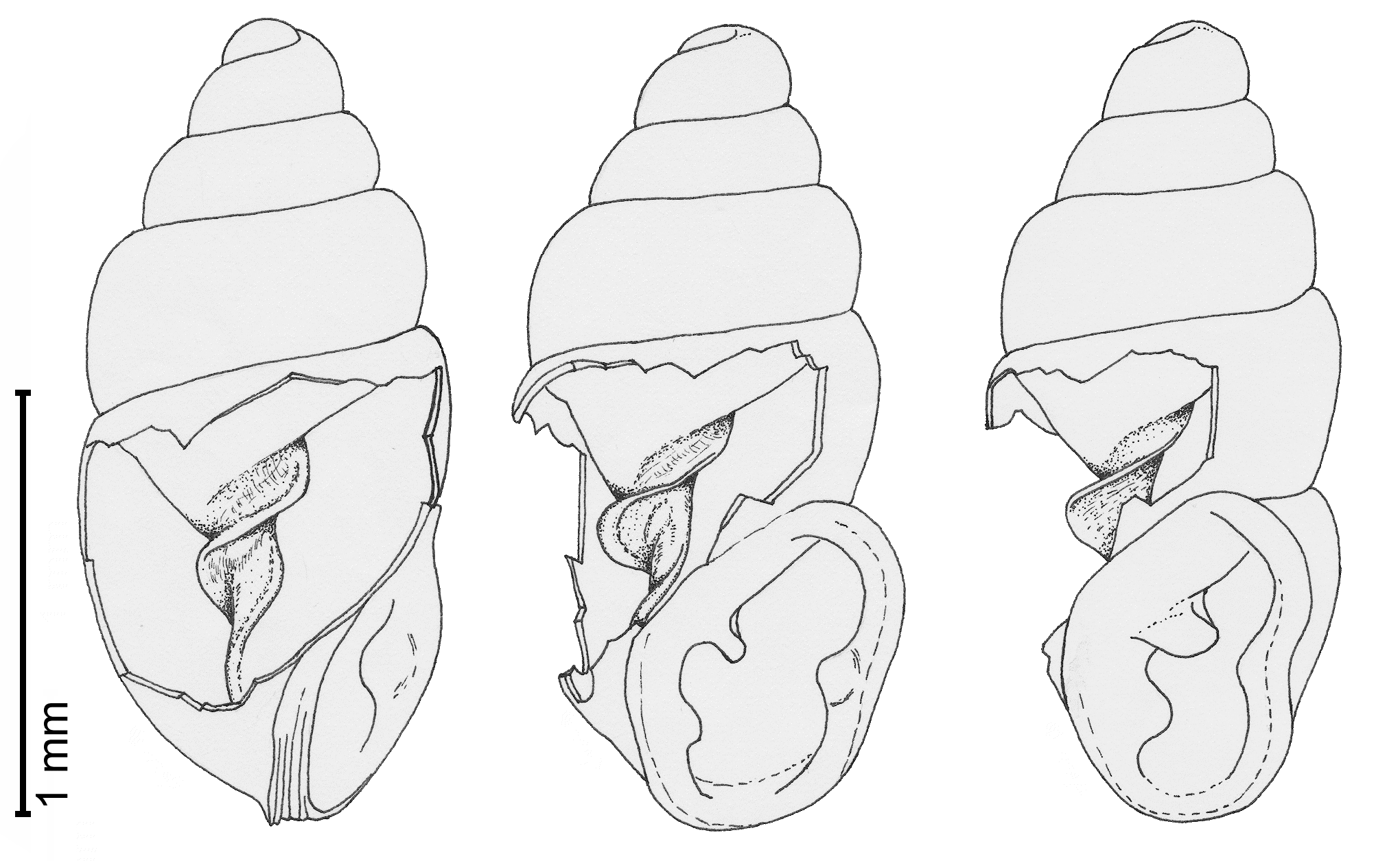
drawing of shells of Carychium minimum

== Distribution ==
The distribution of Carychium minimum is Euro-Asiatic.

- Northern Europe: Denmark, Finland, Norway, Sweden.
- Western Europe: Belgium, France and Corsica, Great Britain and Channel Islands, Ireland, Luxembourg, Netherlands, Switzerland.
- Central Europe: Austria, Czech Republic, Germany, Hungary, Liechtenstein, Poland, Slovakia, Slovenia.
- Southern Europe: Greece including North Aegean islands, Italy.
- Southeastern Europe: Albania, Bosnia-Herzegovina, Bulgaria, Croatia, Montenegro, Romania, Serbia.
- Southwestern Europe: Andorra, Portugal including Azores and Madeira, Spain.
- Eastern Europe: Belarus, Crimea, Estonia, Kaliningrad, Latvia, Lithuania, Moldova, Ukraine, European Russia.
- Southwestern Asia: Turkey, Armenia, Azerbaijan, Georgia
- Western Siberia
- Central Asia: northern, central, and eastern Kazakhstan
- North America - introduced: Canada (British Columbia, Ontario, New Brunswick); USA (California, Massachusetts, New York, Pennsylvania)
