= Trigonochlamys =

Scientific classification
- Kingdom: Animalia
- Phylum: Mollusca
- Class: Gastropoda
- Order: Stylommatophora
- Family: Trigonochlamydidae
- Subfamily: Trigonochlamydinae
- Genus: Trigonochlamys; O. Boettger, 1881

Type species
- Trigonochlamys imitatrix O. Boettger, 1881

Species
- Trigonochlamys adsharicus (Simroth, 1902); Trigonochlamys imitatrix O. Boettger, 1881

Synonyms
- Phrixolestes Simroth, 1902; Trigonochlamys (Phrixolestes) Simroth, 1902; Trigonochlamys (Trigonochlamys) O. Boettger, 1881

Genus of gastropods

Trigonochlamys is a genus of predatory air-breathing land slug. It is a shell-less pulmonate gastropod mollusc in the family Trigonochlamydidae. Trigonochlamys is the type genus of the family Trigonochlamydidae.
