= Troglolestes =

Scientific classification
- Kingdom: Animalia
- Phylum: Mollusca
- Class: Gastropoda
- Order: Stylommatophora
- Family: Trigonochlamydidae
- Subfamily: Trigonochlamydinae
- Genus: Troglolestes; Ljovushkin & Matiokin, 1965
- Species: T. sokolovi

Binomial name
- Troglolestes sokolovi Liovushkin & Matiokin, 1965

Genus of predatory air-breathing land slugs

Troglolestes sokolovi is a species of predatory air-breathing land slug. It is a shell-less pulmonate gastropod mollusc in the family Trigonochlamydidae.

Troglolestes sokolovi is the only species in the genus Troglolestes.

The generic name Troglolestes contains the suffix -lestes, that means "robber".

== Distribution ==
The distribution of Troglolestes sokolovi includes only its type locality.

The type locality of Troglolestes sokolovi is the Vorontzovskaya Cave near Sochi, Russia.

== Ecology ==
Troglolestes sokolovi inhabits the cave. Animals inhabiting caves are called troglobites. It was discovered as the first species of troglobite slug in 1965.
