= Khostalestes =

Scientific classification
- Kingdom: Animalia
- Phylum: Mollusca
- Class: Gastropoda
- Order: Stylommatophora
- Family: Trigonochlamydidae
- Subfamily: Trigonochlamydinae
- Genus: Khostalestes; Suvorov, 2003
- Species: K. kochetkovi

Binomial name
- Khostalestes kochetkovi Suvorov, 2003

Species of gastropod

Khostalestes kochetkovi is a species of predatory air-breathing land slug. It is a shell-less pulmonate gastropod mollusc in the family Trigonochlamydidae.

Khostalestes kochetkovi is the only species in the genus Khostalestes.

The generic name Khostalestes is composed of the name of the settlement of Khosta, which is its type locality, along with the suffix -lestes, which means "robber".

== Distribution ==
The known distribution of Khostalestes kochetkovi includes only its type locality.

The type locality of Khostalestes kochetkovi is the wood near the settlement of Khosta in the Caucasian State Natural Biosphere Reserve, Krasnodar Krai, Russia, Northwestern Caucasus.

== Description ==
The tail of the slug is pointed and has a keel. The mantle covers the first one third of the body. The pneumostome is in the posterior part of the mantle.

== Ecology ==
Khostalestes kochetkovi inhabits deciduous subtropical forest with yew and with box trees and can be found under stones.
