= Boreolestes likharevi =

Scientific classification
- Kingdom: Animalia
- Phylum: Mollusca
- Class: Gastropoda
- Order: Stylommatophora
- Family: Trigonochlamydidae
- Genus: Boreolestes
- Species: B. likharevi

Binomial name
- Boreolestes likharevi Schileyko & Kijashko, 1999

Species of gastropod

Boreolestes likharevi is a species of predatory air-breathing land slug, a shell-less pulmonate gastropod mollusc in the family Trigonochlamydidae.

Boreolestes likharevi is the type species of the genus Boreolestes.

The specific name likharevi is in honor of the Russian malacologist Ilya Mikhailovich Likharev.

== Distribution ==
The type locality for Boreolestes likharevi is the west-facing slope of Mount Oshten, Oshten-Fisht Mountains, North-Western Caucasus, Republic of Adygea, Russia.
