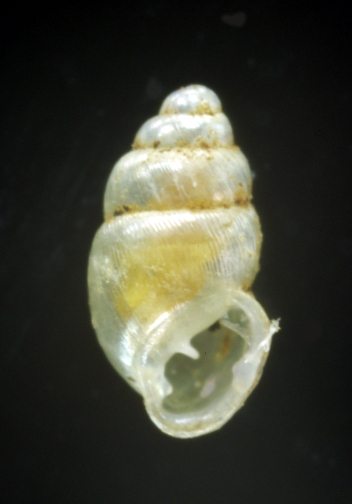
- Shell of Carychium minimum

Scientific classification
- Kingdom: Animalia
- Phylum: Mollusca
- Class: Gastropoda
- Order: Ellobiida
- Family: Ellobiidae
- Subfamily: Carychiinae
- Genus: Carychium; O. F. Müller, 1773

Synonyms
- Auricella Jurine, 1817; Auriculina Moquin-Tandon, 1856; Carychium (Carychium) O.F. Müller, 1773· accepted, alternate representation; Carychium (Saraphia) Risso, 1826 (junior synonym); Saraphia Risso, 1826

= Carychium =

Genus of gastropods

Carychium is a genus of very small air-breathing land snails, terrestrial pulmonate gastropod mollusks in the family Ellobiidae.

== Species ==
species within the genus Carychium include:

- Carychium achimszulci Stworzewicz, 1999, Miocene
- Carychium antiquum Braun, 1843, Miocence
- †Carychium apathyi Gaál, 1911, Miocene
- Carychium arboreum Dourson, 2012
- Carychium belizeense Jochum & Weigand, 2017
- †Carychium berellense Laubrière & Carez, 1880, Paleocene
- †Carychium bermudense Gulick, 1904, Pliocene
- †Carychium bigeminatum (Deshayes, 1863), Paleocene
- Carychium biondii Paulucci, 1882
- Carychium boysianum Benson, 1864
- Carychium carinatum Haufen, 1858
- †Carychium cholnokyi Gaál, 1911, Miocene
- Carychium clappi Hubricht, 1959
- Carychium costaricanum Von Martens, 1898
- †Carychium cylindroides Staadt, 1913, Paleocene
- Carychium cymatoplax Pilsbry, 1901
- †Carychium dhorni (Deshayes, 1863), Paleocene
- †Carychium euboicum Schütt, 1988, Miocene
- †Carychium eumicrum Bourguignat, 1857, Miocene
- Carychium exiguum (Say, 1822)
- Carychium exile H. C. Lea, 1842
- †Carychium fischeri Boettger, 1903, Oligocene
- Carychium floridanum Clapp, 1918
- Carychium gibbum (Sandberger, 1875)
- †Carychium gracile Sandberger, 1875, Miocene
- Carychium hachijoensis Pilsbry, 1902
- Carychium hardiei Jochum & Weigand, 2017
- Carychium hellenicum Bank & Gittenberger, 1985
- †Carychium hypermeces Cossmann, 1889, Paleocene
- Carychium ibazoricum Bank & Gittenberger, 1985
- Carychium indicum Benson, 1849
- †Carychium interferens (Deshayes, 1863), Paleocene
- Carychium jardineanum (Chitty, 1853)
- Carychium javanum von Möllendorff, 1897
- Carychium lederi O. Boettger, 1880
- Carychium loheri von Möllendorff, 1898
- †Carychium majus Boettger, 1870, Miocene
- Carychium mariae Paulucci, 1878
- Carychium mexicanum Pilsbry, 1891
- ?†Carychium michaudi (Boissy, 1848), Paleocene
- †Carychium michelini (Boissy, 1846), Paleocene
- Carychium minimum ( O. F. Müller, 1774)
- Carychium minusculum Gredler, 1887
- †Carychium moenanum Wenz, 1917, Oligocene
- Carychium nannodes G. H. Clapp, 1905
- †Carychium nincki Cossmann, 1913, Eocene
- Carychium nipponense Pilsbry & Hirase, 1904
- Carychium noduliferum Reinhardt, 1877
- †Carychium nouleti Bourguignat, 1857, Miocene/Pliocene
- Carychium occidentale Pilsbry, 1891
- †Carychium pachychilus Sandberger, 1875, Miocene
- Carychium paganettii Zimmermann, 1925
- Carychium panamaense Jochum, 2018
- Carychium pessimum Pilsbry, 1902
- †Carychium pseudotetrodon Strauch, 1977, Miocene
- †Carychium puisseguri Truc, 1972, Pliocene
- Carychium pulchellum Freyer 1855,
- †Carychium quadridens (Andreae, 1884), Eocene
- †Carychium remiensis (Boissy, 1848), Paleocene
- †Carychium rhenanum Strauch, 1977, Pliocene
- Carychium riparium Hubricht, 1978
- †Carychium sandbergeri Handmann, 1887, Miocene/Pliocene
- †Carychium schlickumi Strauch, 1977, Miocene/Pliocene
- †Carychium schwageri Reuss, 1868, Miocene
- ?Carychium sianicum Caziot, 1910, subrecent
- Carychium sibiricum Gerstfeldt, 1859
- †Carychium sparnacense Deshayes, 1863, Paleocene
- †Carychium starobogatovi Steklov, 1966, Miocene/Pliocene
- Carychium stygium Call, 1897
- †Carychium suevicum Boettger, 1877, Miocene
- †Carychium surai Stworzewicz, 1999, Miocene
- †Carychium tetrodon (Paladilhe, 1873), Paleocene
- Carychium thailandicum Burch & Panha, 1998
- Carychium tianmushanense Chen, 1992
- Carychium tridentatum (Risso, 1826)
- †Carychium vindobonense (Handmann, 1882), Pliocene
- Carychium zarzaae Jochum & Weigand, 2017
