= Drilolestes =

Scientific classification
- Kingdom: Animalia
- Phylum: Mollusca
- Class: Gastropoda
- Order: Stylommatophora
- Family: Trigonochlamydidae
- Subfamily: Trigonochlamydinae
- Genus: Drilolestes; Lindholm, 1925
- Species: D. retowskii

Binomial name
- Drilolestes retowskii (O. Boettger, 1884)

Synonyms
- Pseudomilax retowskii Boettger, 1884; Pseudomilax reibischi Simroth, 1901; Pseudomilax ananowi Simroth, 1901; Pseudomilax orientalis Simroth, 1912

Species of gastropod

Drilolestes retowskii is a species of predatory air-breathing land slug. It is a shell-less pulmonate gastropod mollusc in the family Trigonochlamydidae.

Drilolestes retowskii is the only species in the genus Drilolestes.

The generic name Drilolestes contains the suffix -lestes, that means "robber".

== Description ==
The size of preserved specimens is 12–18 mm. Live individuals are larger.

== Distribution ==
The distribution of Drilolestes retowskii includes northern Turkey (Vilayet Zonguldak) and Georgia in the Caucasus region, specifically on the Psyrtzkha River in Abkhazia, near the New Athos Cave.

== Ecology ==
Drilolestes retowskii inhabits forests and alpine zone.
