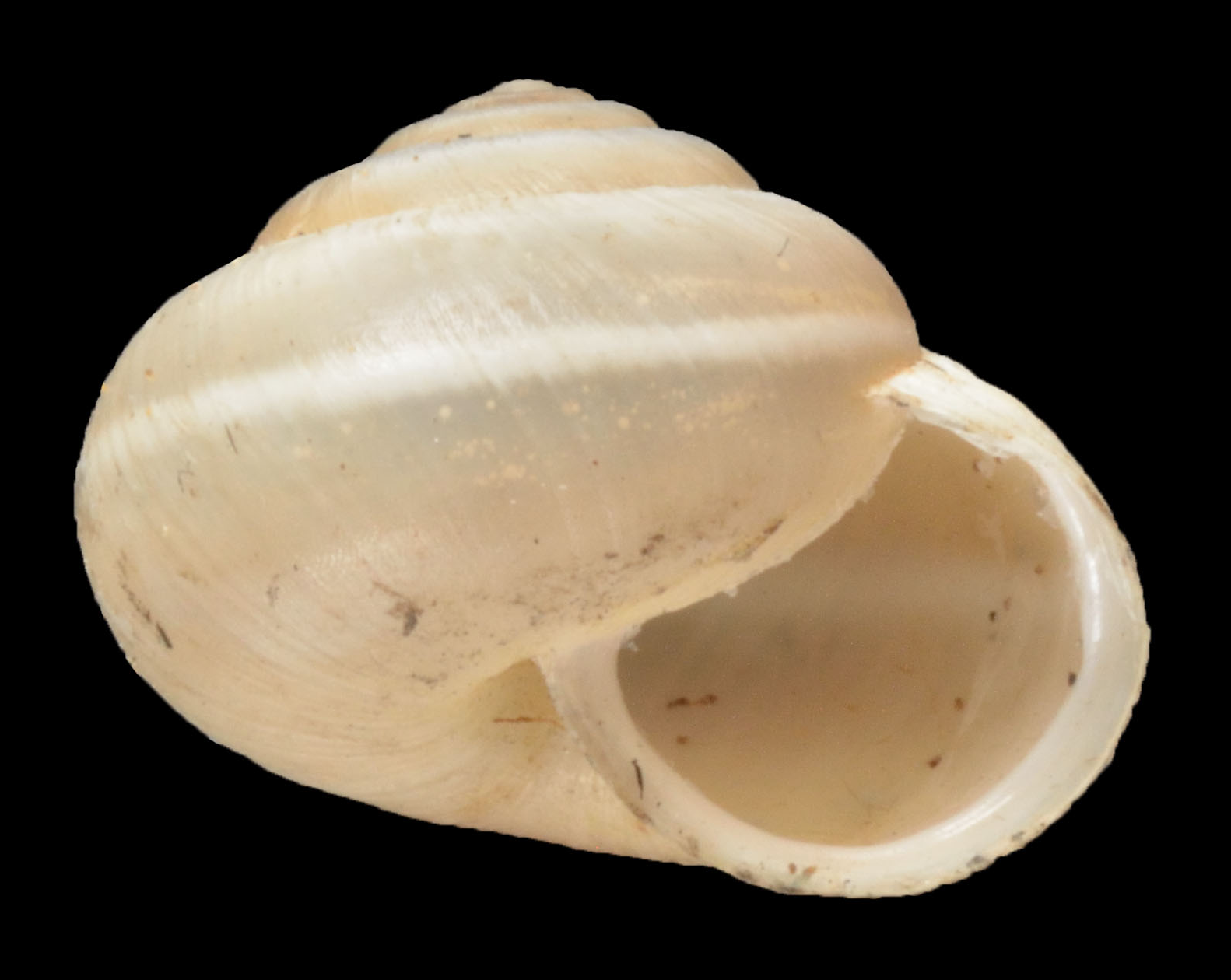
- Apertual view of a shell of Harmozica ravergiensis.

Scientific classification
- Kingdom: Animalia
- Phylum: Mollusca
- Class: Gastropoda
- Order: Stylommatophora
- Family: Hygromiidae
- Genus: Harmozica; Lindholm, 1927

= Harmozica (gastropod) =

Genus of gastropods

Harmozica is a genus of air-breathing land snails, terrestrial pulmonate gastropod mollusks in the family Hygromiidae, the hairy snails and their allies.

== Species ==
Species with the genus include:

subgenus Batumica Schileyko, 1978

- Harmozica maiae (Hudec & Lezhawa, 1969)

subgenus Diplobursa Schileyko, 1968

- Harmozica assadovi (Likharev & Rammelmeyer, 1952)
- Harmozica pisiformis (L. Pfeiffer, 1846)

subgenus Harmozica Lindholm, 1927

- Harmozica ravergiensis (A. Férussac, 1835) - type species of the genus Harmozica

subgenus Stenomphalia Lindholm, 1927

- Harmozica selecta (Klika, 1894)
