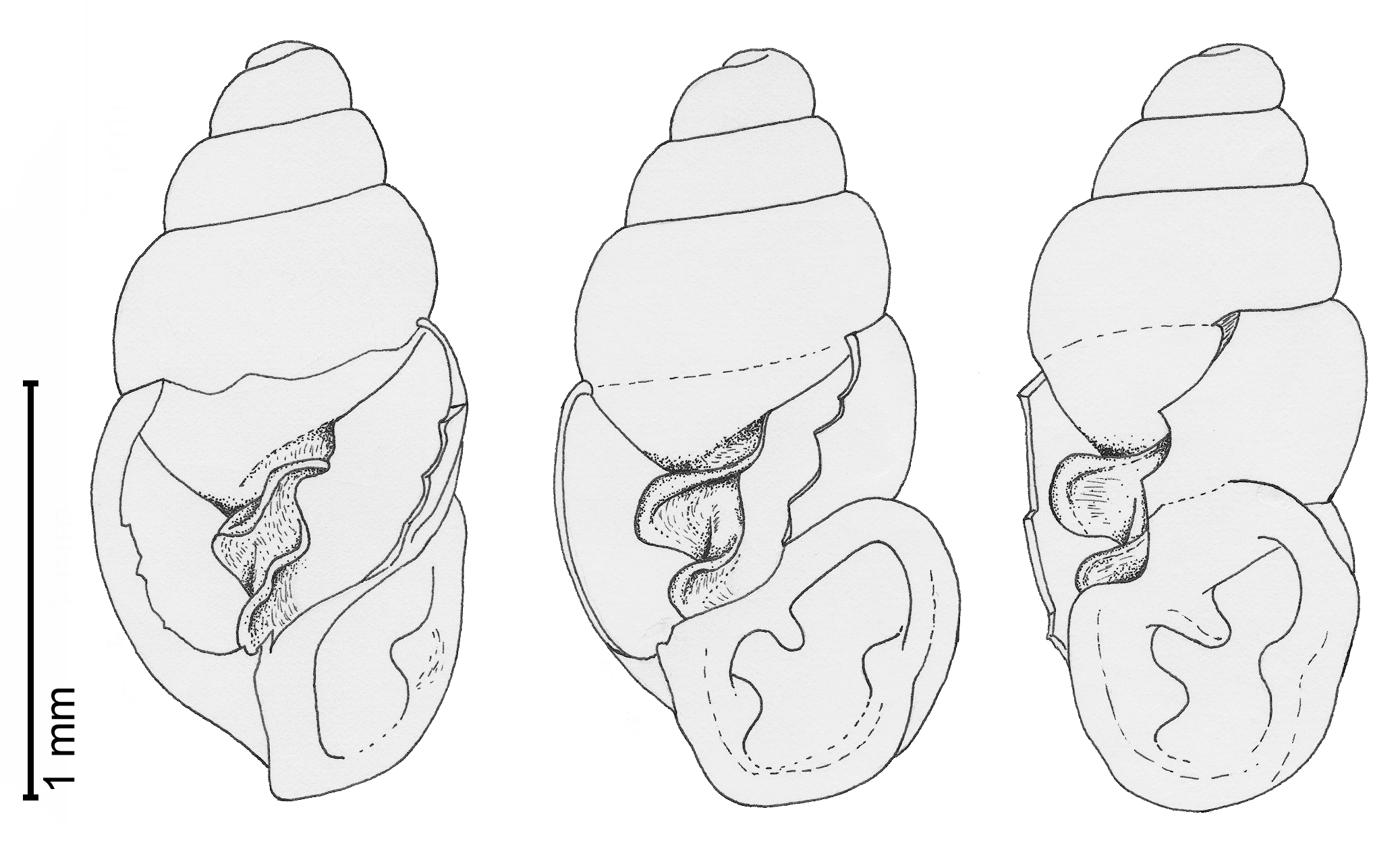
- Drawing of shells of Carychium mariae

Scientific classification
- Domain: Eukaryota
- Kingdom: Animalia
- Phylum: Mollusca
- Class: Gastropoda
- Order: Ellobiida
- Family: Ellobiidae
- Genus: Carychium
- Species: C. mariae

Binomial name
- Carychium mariae Paulucci, 1878

= Carychium mariae =

Species of gastropod

Carychium mariae is a species of small air-breathing land snail, a terrestrial pulmonate gastropod mollusk in the family Ellobiidae.

Carychium mariae was described by Italian malacologist Marianna Panciatichi Ximenes d’Aragona Paulucci (1835-1919) in 1878.

== Distribution ==
This species occurs in European countries and islands including:

- France
- Italy
- Slovenia
- Croatia
