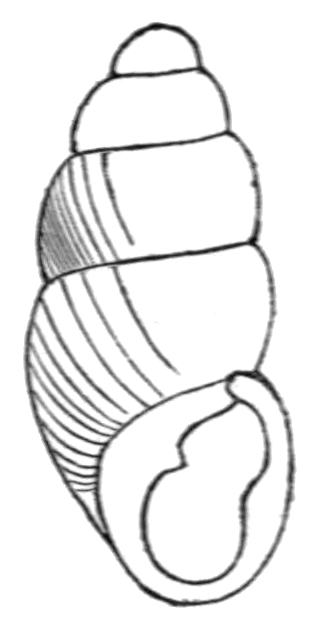
- Carychium exiguum

Conservation status
- Secure (NatureServe)

Scientific classification
- Kingdom: Animalia
- Phylum: Mollusca
- Class: Gastropoda
- Order: Ellobiida
- Family: Ellobiidae
- Genus: Carychium
- Species: C. exiguum

Binomial name
- Carychium exiguum (Say, 1822)

Synonyms
- Carychium euphaeum Bourguignat, 1857; Carychium existelium Bourguignat, 1857; Carychium perexiguum Baker, 1938; Pupa exigua Say, 1822

= Carychium exiguum =

Species of gastropod

Carychium exiguum, common name the obese thorn snail, is a species of small air-breathing land snail, a terrestrial pulmonate gastropod mollusk in the subfamily Carychiinae.
