= Boreolestes sylvestris =

Scientific classification
- Kingdom: Animalia
- Phylum: Mollusca
- Class: Gastropoda
- Order: Stylommatophora
- Family: Trigonochlamydidae
- Genus: Boreolestes
- Species: B. sylvestris

Binomial name
- Boreolestes sylvestris Kijashko in Schileyko & Kijashko, 1999

Species of gastropod

Boreolestes sylvestris is a species of predatory air-breathing land slug, a shell-less pulmonate gastropod mollusc in the family Trigonochlamydidae.

== Distribution ==
The type locality for Boreolestes sylvestris is 6 km from Ghooseriple at the Molchepa riverside in North-Western Caucasus, Republic of Adygea, Russia.

The distribution of Boreolestes sylvestris includes the upper part of the Belaya River basin.
