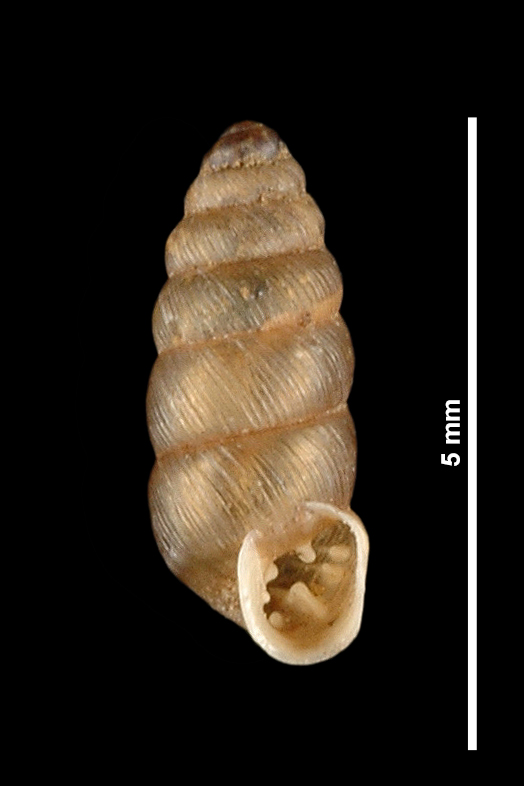
- Shell of Granopupa granum

Scientific classification
- Domain: Eukaryota
- Kingdom: Animalia
- Phylum: Mollusca
- Class: Gastropoda
- Order: Stylommatophora
- Superfamily: Pupilloidea
- Family: Chondrinidae
- Subfamily: Granariinae
- Genus: Granopupa; Boettger, 1889

Type species
- Pupa granum Draparnaud, 1801

= Granopupa =

Genus of gastropods

Granopupa is a genus of air-breathing land snails in the subfamily Granariinae of the family Chondrinidae.

The species of this genus are found in Western Europe and Mediterranean.

Species:

- Granopupa granum (Draparnaud, 1801)
- Granopupa somaliensis Verdcourt, 1963
