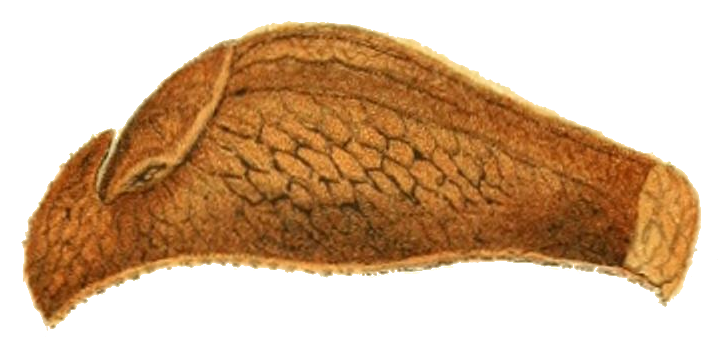
- Drawing of Parmacellilla filipowitschi from the type description. Head in on the right.

Scientific classification
- Kingdom: Animalia
- Phylum: Mollusca
- Class: Gastropoda
- Order: Stylommatophora
- Family: Trigonochlamydidae
- Subfamily: Parmacellillinae; Hesse, 1926
- Genus: Parmacellilla; Simroth, 1910
- Species: P. filipowitschi

Binomial name
- Parmacellilla filipowitschi Simroth, 1910

= Parmacellilla =

Genus of gastropod

Parmacellilla filipowitschi is a species of predatory air-breathing land slug. It is a shell-less pulmonate gastropod mollusc in the family Trigonochlamydidae.

Parmacellilla filipowitschi is the only species in the genus Parmacellilla, which in turn is the only genus in the subfamily Parmacellillinae.

The generic name Parmacellilla is based on its similarity to the genus Parmacella. The specific name filipowitschi is in honor of E. M. Filipowitsch, who collected the type specimen in 1905.

== Distribution ==
The type locality is Gorgan (also known as Astrabad) in Iran.
