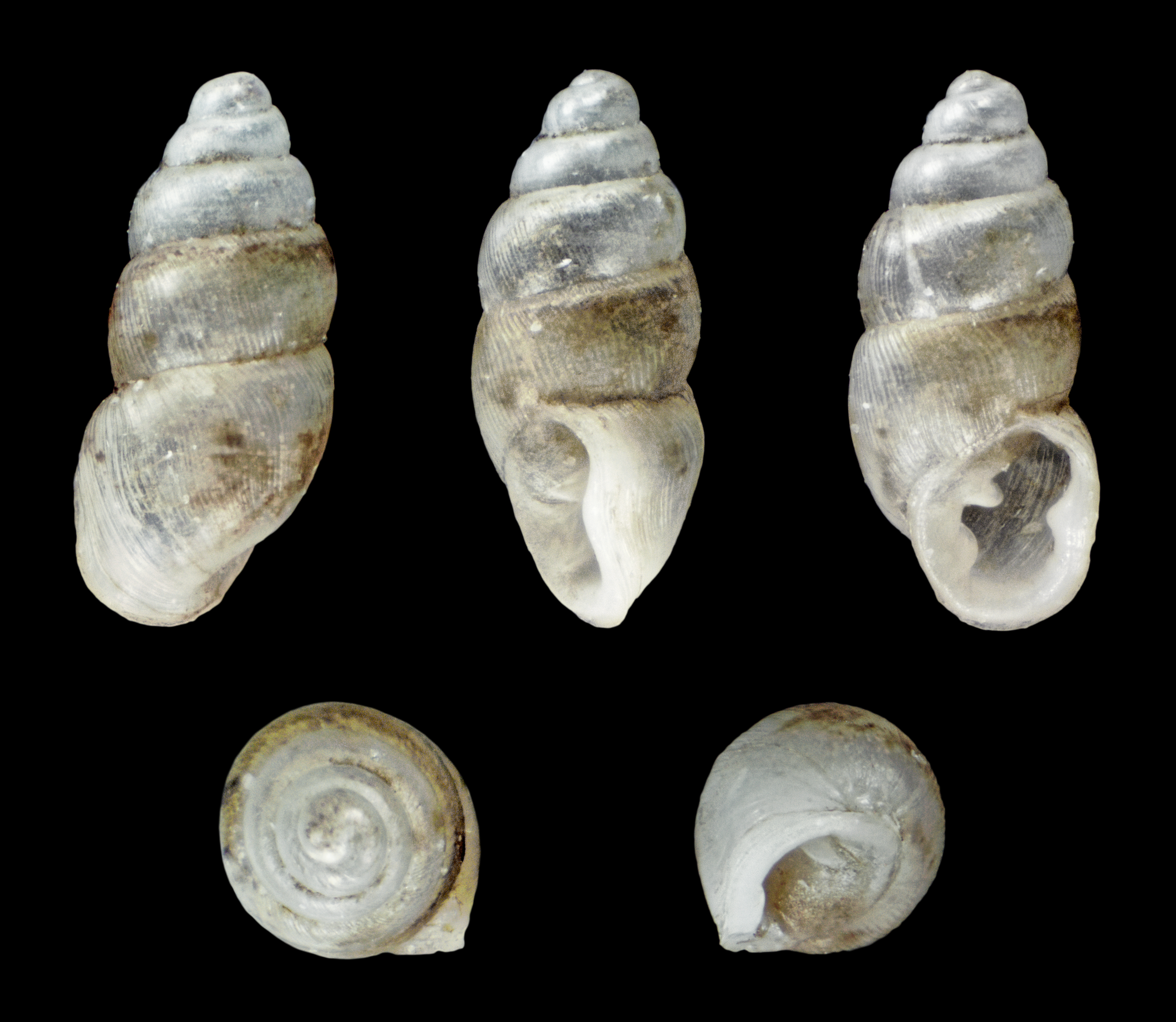
- Apertural view of shell

Conservation status
- Secure (NatureServe)

Scientific classification
- Kingdom: Animalia
- Phylum: Mollusca
- Class: Gastropoda
- Order: Ellobiida
- Family: Ellobiidae
- Genus: Carychium
- Species: C. tridentatum

Binomial name
- Carychium tridentatum (Risso, 1826)

Synonyms
- Saraphia tridentata Risso, 1826

= Carychium tridentatum =

Species of gastropod

Carychium tridentatum is a species of small air-breathing land snail, a terrestrial pulmonate gastropod mollusk in the family Ellobiidae.

== Description ==
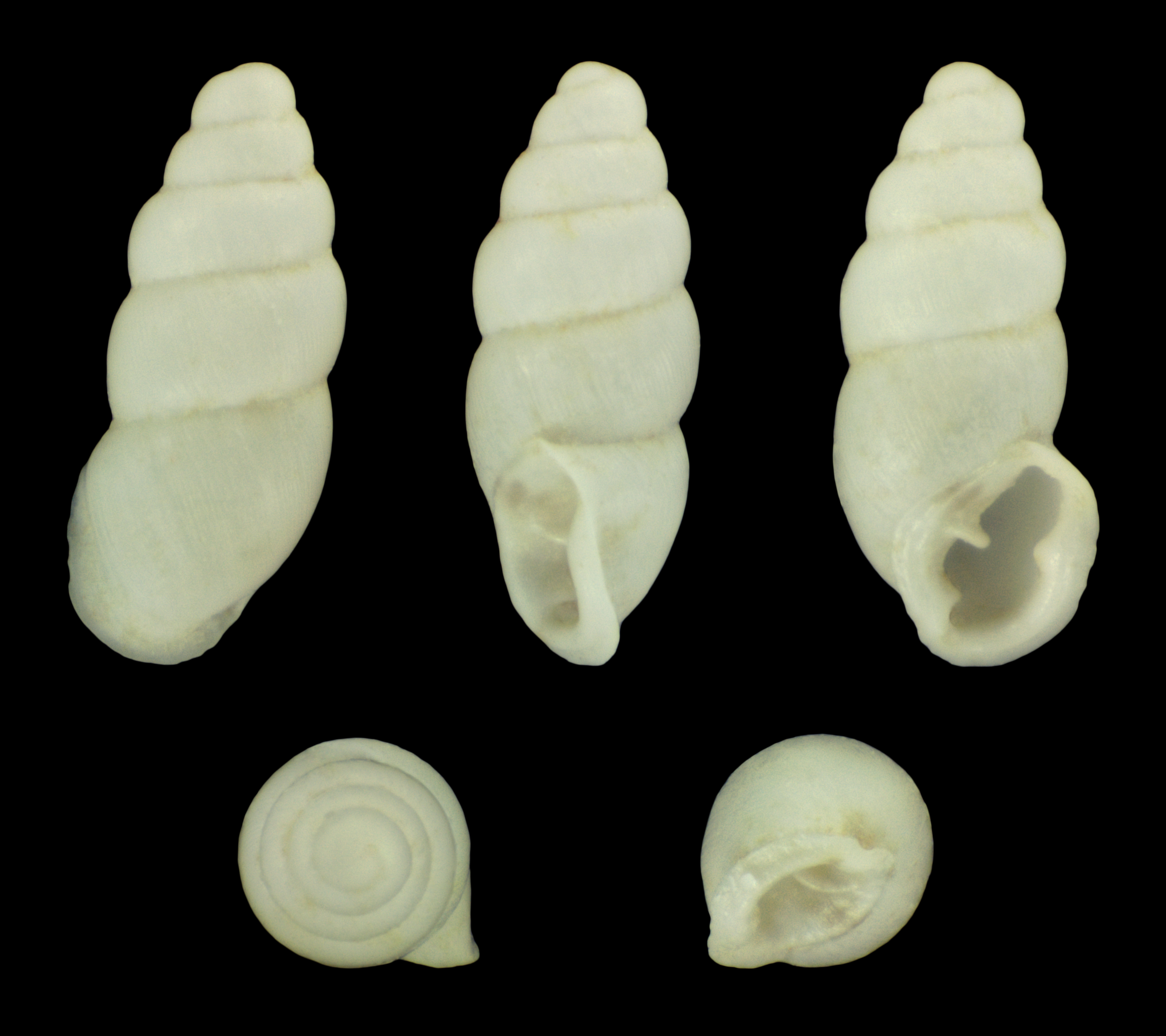
Fossil, Pleistocene

The shell is 1.8-2.3 mm high x 0.8-0.9mm. wide. The shell is more slender than that of Carychium minimum. If the last whorl above the aperture is opened this shows the parietalis (a spiral ridge on the parietal region projecting into the interior of the shell) descending in a characteristic double curve (see figure below).

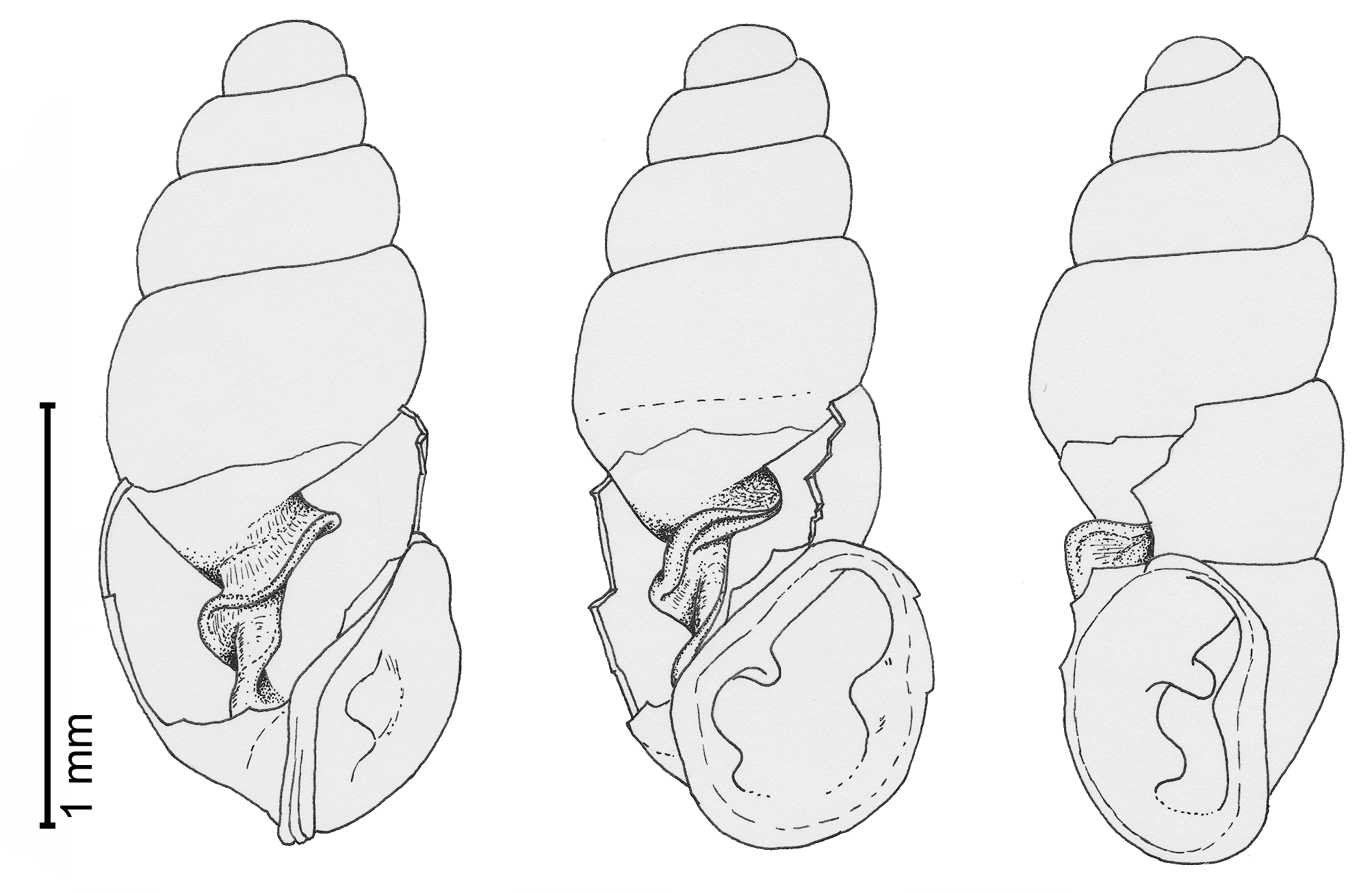
Drawing of shells of Carychium tridentatum that have been broken open to show the internal structure.

== Distribution ==
This species occurs in European countries and islands the Mediterranean, the Caucasus region and North Africa. It is recorded from Siberia as Carychium striolatum J.R. Bourguignat, 1857 (synonym)

The European countries include:

- Belgium
- Bulgaria
- Czech Republic
- Netherlands
- Poland
- Slovakia
- Great Britain
- Ireland
- Ukraine

Albania, Andorra, Austria, Azores, Belarus, Bulgaria, Channel Islands , Croatia, Denmark, Estonia, Finland, France, Germany, Greece, Hungary, Italy, Kaliningrad, Latvia, Liechtenstein, Lithuania, Luxembourg, Madeira, Moldova, Montenegro, Norway, Romania, Serbia, Slovenia, Spain, Sweden, Switzerland.

It has been introduced to North America, including to:

- British Columbia, Canada
