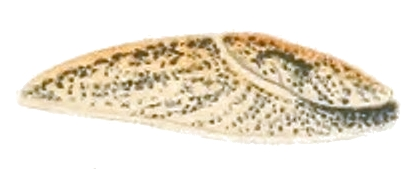
- A 1912 drawing of a preserved specimen of Deroceras bakurianum from the original description by Heinrich Simroth.

Scientific classification
- Kingdom: Animalia
- Phylum: Mollusca
- Class: Gastropoda
- Order: Stylommatophora
- Family: Agriolimacidae
- Genus: Deroceras
- Species: D. bakurianum

Binomial name
- Deroceras bakurianum (Simroth, 1912)

Synonyms
- Agriolimax bakurianus Simroth, 1912

= Deroceras bakurianum =

Species of gastropod

Deroceras bakurianum is a species of air-breathing land slug, a terrestrial pulmonate gastropod mollusk in the family Agriolimacidae.

Its specific name is after its type locality, which is in Bakuriani.

== Distribution ==
The species occurs in the Caucasus: Georgia and other areas.

The type locality is Bakuriani in the Borjomi district, in Georgia.

== Ecology ==
This species lives in forests.
