= Hyrcanolestes =

Hyrcanolestes velitaris

Scientific classification
- Kingdom: Animalia
- Phylum: Mollusca
- Class: Gastropoda
- Order: Stylommatophora
- Family: Trigonochlamydidae
- Genus: Hyrcanolestes; Simroth, 1901
- Species: H. velitaris

Binomial name
- Hyrcanolestes velitaris (Martens, 1880)

Synonyms
- Parmacella velitaris Martens, 1880; Pseudomilax bicolor O. Boettger, 1881; Hyrcanolestes valentini Simroth, 1901; Hyrcanolestes armeniacus Simroth, 1910; Hyrcanolestes kaznakovi Simroth, 1912; Hyrcanolestes varius Simroth, 1912; Hyrcanolestes obscurus Simroth, 1912; Hyrcanolestes fursovi Simroth, 1912; Hyrcanolestes declivis Simroth, 1912; Chrysalidomilax sphingiformis Simroth, 1912

Genus of mollusc

Hyrcanolestes is a monotypic genus containing the single species Hyrcanolestes velitaris, a predatory air-breathing land slug. It is a shell-less pulmonate gastropod mollusc in the family Trigonochlamydidae.

The generic name Hyrcanolestes contains the suffix -lestes, that means "robber".

== Distribution ==
The distribution of Hyrcanolestes velitaris includes:

- Iran
- Lankaran Lowland, Azerbaijan
- Talysh Mountains
- Lesser Caucasus
- Greater Caucasus

The type locality of Hyrcanolestes velitaris is Gorgan, northern Iran.

== Ecology ==
Hyrcanolestes velitaris inhabits forests.
