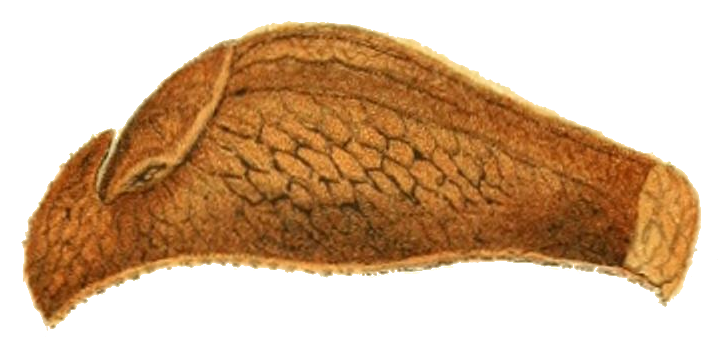
- Parmacellilla filipowitschi

Scientific classification
- Kingdom: Animalia
- Phylum: Mollusca
- Class: Gastropoda
- Order: Stylommatophora
- Superfamily: Parmacelloidea
- Family: Trigonochlamydidae; Hesse, 1882

Subfamilies and genera
- Parmacellillinae P. Hesse, 1926; Parmacellilla Simroth, 1910; Trigonochlamydinae P. Hesse, 1882; Boreolestes Schileyko & Kijashko, 1999; Drilolestes Lindholm, 1925; Hyrcanolestes Simroth, 1901; Khostalestes Suvorov, 2003; Lesticulus Schileyko, 1988; Pseudomilax O. Boettger, 1881; Trigonochlamys O. Boettger, 1881; Troglolestes Liovushkin & Matiokin, 1965

Diversity
- 9 genera, 11 species

= Trigonochlamydidae =

Trigonochlamydidae Temporal range: Recent

Family of gastropods

Trigonochlamydidae is a family of air-breathing land slugs, terrestrial gastropod molluscs in the clade Eupulmonata (according to the taxonomy of the Gastropoda by Bouchet & Rocroi, 2005).

== Distribution ==
The native distribution of Trigonochlamydidae includes Caucasus, Iran and Turkey.

== Taxonomy ==
Previously, Trigonochlamydidae was placed in the superfamily Trigonochlamydoidea Hesse, 1882, in the subinfraorder Sigmurethra. This was the only family within that superfamily.

The family Trigonochlamydidae is now classified within the limacoid clade, which itself belongs to the clade Stylommatophora, within the clade Eupulmonata (according to the taxonomy of the Gastropoda by Bouchet & Rocroi, 2005).

The following two subfamilies have been recognized in the taxonomy of Bouchet & Rocroi (2005):

- subfamily Trigonochlamydinae Hesse, 1882 – synonyms: Selenochlamydinae I. M. Likharev & Wiktor, 1980
- subfamily Parmacellillinae Hesse, 1926

== Genera ==
There are nine genera in the family Trigonochlamydidae with a total of 11 species:

Subfamily Trigonochlamydinae

- Boreolestes Schileyko & Kijashko, 1999
  - Boreolestes likharevi Schileyko & Kijashko, 1999 – type species
  - Boreolestes sylvestris Kijashko in Schileyko & Kijashko, 1999
- Drilolestes Lindholm, 1925 – with only one species Drilolestes retowskii (O. Boettger, 1884)
- Hyrcanolestes Simroth, 1901 – with only one species Hyrcanolestes velitaris (Martens, 1880)
- Khostalestes Suvorov, 2003 – with only one species Khostalestes kochetkovi Suvorov, 2003
- Lesticulus Schileyko, 1988 – with only one species Lesticulus nocturnus Schileyko, 1988
- Trigonochlamys O. Boettger, 1881 – type genus of the family Trigonochlamydidae, with only one species Trigonochlamys imitatrix O. Boettger, 1881
- Troglolestes Ljovushkin & Matiokin, 1965 – with only one species Troglolestes sokolovi Liovushkin & Matiokin, 1965

Subfamily Parmacellillinae

- Parmacellilla Simroth, 1910 – type genus of the subfamily Parmacellillinae, with only one species Parmacellilla filipowitschi Simroth, 1910

Synonym:

- Pseudomilax O. Boettger, 1881 is a synonym for various genera in Trigonochlamydidae.

Selenochlamys O. Boettger, 1883 has been removed from the Trigonochlamydidae to the Oxychilidae based on DNA evidence.

== Cladogram ==
The following cladogram shows the phylogenic relationships of this family with the other families in the limacoid clade:

- limacoid clade
  - Staffordioidea
    Staffordiidae
  - - - Dyakioidea
        Dyakiidae
      - Gastrodontoidea
        - Pristilomatidae
        - - Chronidae
          - - Euconulidae
            - Trochomorphidae
          - - Gastrodontidae
            - Oxychilidae
    - - Parmacelloidea
        - Trigonochlamydidae
        - Parmacellidae
        - Milacidae
      - - - Zonitoidea
            Zonitidae
          - Helicarionoidea
            - Helicarionidae
            - - Ariophantidae
              - Urocyclidae
        - Limacoidea
          - Vitrinidae
          - - Boettgerillidae
            - - Limacidae
              - Agriolimacidae
