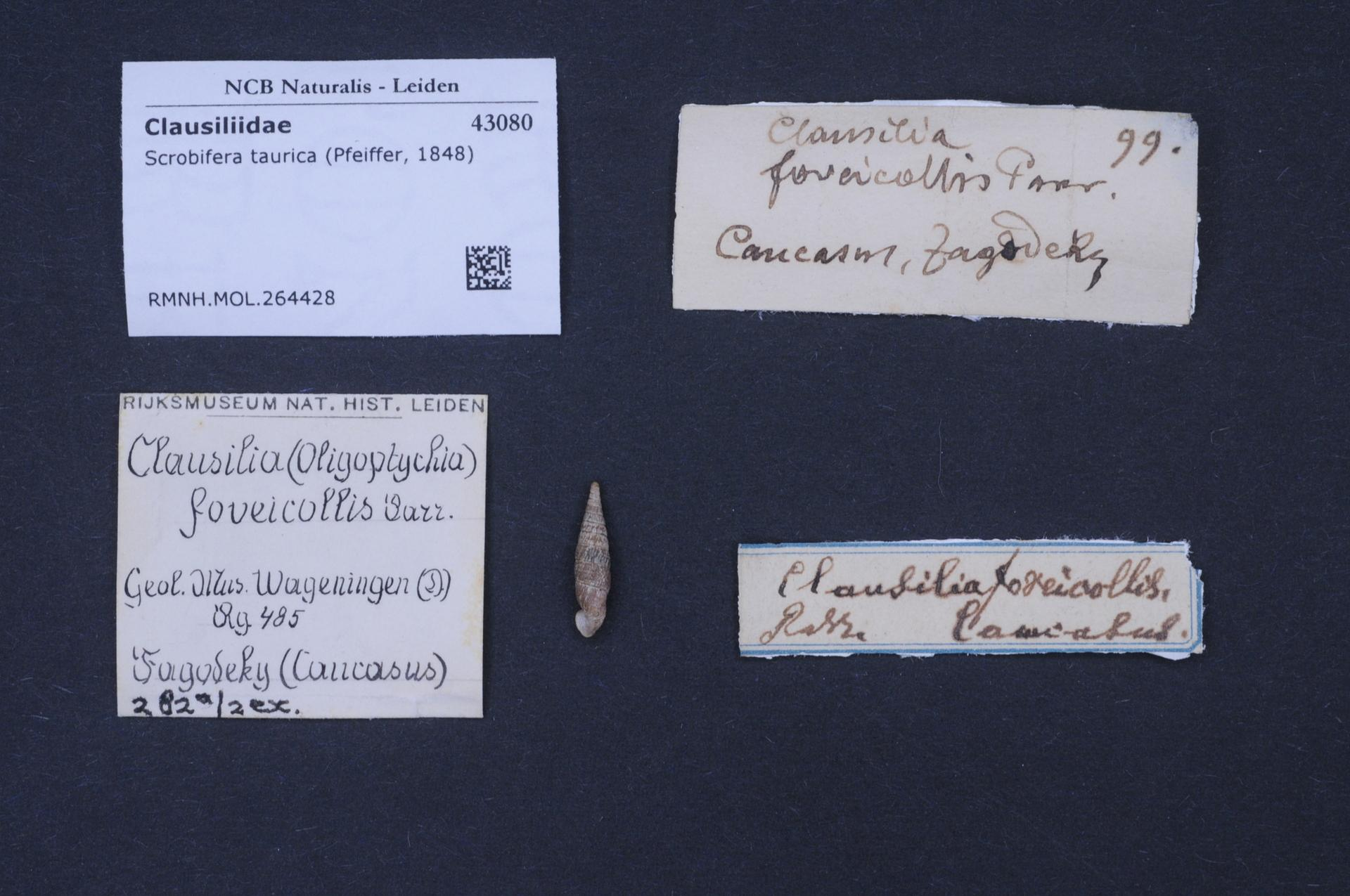
- Scrobifera taurica

Scientific classification
- Kingdom: Animalia
- Phylum: Mollusca
- Class: Gastropoda
- Order: Stylommatophora
- Family: Clausiliidae
- Genus: Scrobifera; Boettger, 1877
- Species: S. taurica

Binomial name
- Scrobifera taurica (Pfeiffer, 1848)

= Scrobifera =

Genus of molluscs

Scrobifera is a monotypic genus of gastropods belonging to the family Clausiliidae. The only species is Scrobifera taurica.

The species is found in Western Asia.
