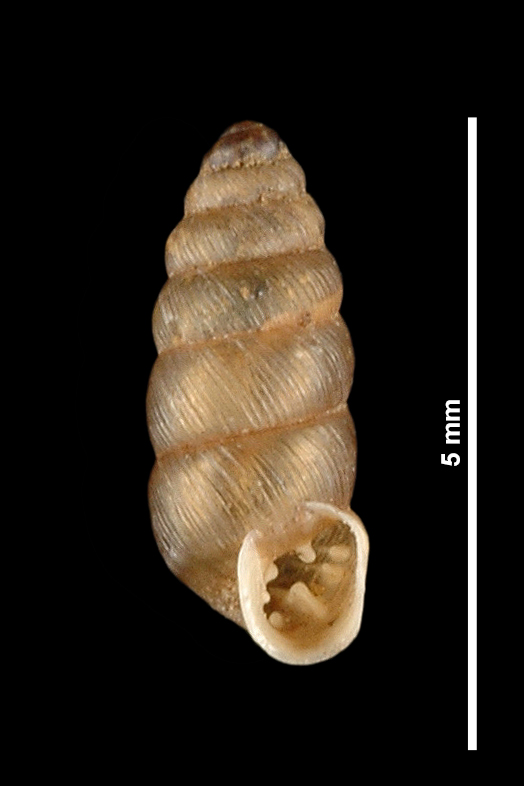
- Shell of Granopupa granum

Scientific classification
- Kingdom: Animalia
- Phylum: Mollusca
- Class: Gastropoda
- Order: Stylommatophora
- Family: Chondrinidae
- Genus: Granopupa
- Species: G. granum

Binomial name
- Granopupa granum (Draparnaud, 1801)

= Granopupa granum =

Species of gastropods

Granopupa granum is a species of air-breathing land snails in the family Chondrinidae.

The species is found in Western Europe and Mediterranean.
