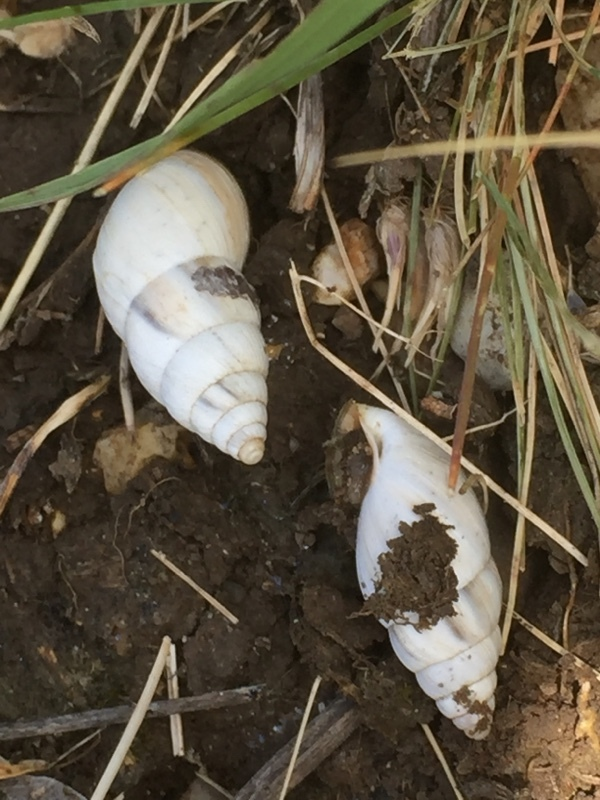

Scientific classification
- Kingdom: Animalia
- Phylum: Mollusca
- Class: Gastropoda
- Order: Stylommatophora
- Family: Enidae
- Genus: Georginapaeus; Schileyko, 1998
- Species: G. hohenackeri

Binomial name
- Georginapaeus hohenackeri (Pfeiffer, 1848)

Synonyms
- List (Species): Buliminus (Zebrina) hohenackeri (L. Pfeiffer, 1848); Buliminus detritus f. parvulus Nägele, 1893; Buliminus hohenackeri (L. Pfeiffer, 1848); Bulimus hohenackeri L. Pfeiffer, 1848; Bulimus interfuscus Issel, 1865; Bulimus xanthostomus L. Pfeiffer, 1848; Napaeopsis hohenackeri (L. Pfeiffer, 1848); Zebrinus hohenackeri (L. Pfeiffer, 1848)

= Georginapaeus =

Georginapaeus hohenackeri

Genus of molluscs

Georginapaeus is a genus of gastropods in the family Enidae. It is monotypic, being represented by the single species Georginapaeus hohenackeri.

This snail is found around freshwater rivers in Armenia, Azerbaijan, Georgia, eastern Turkey, and northern Iran, and in one case, southern Iran.
