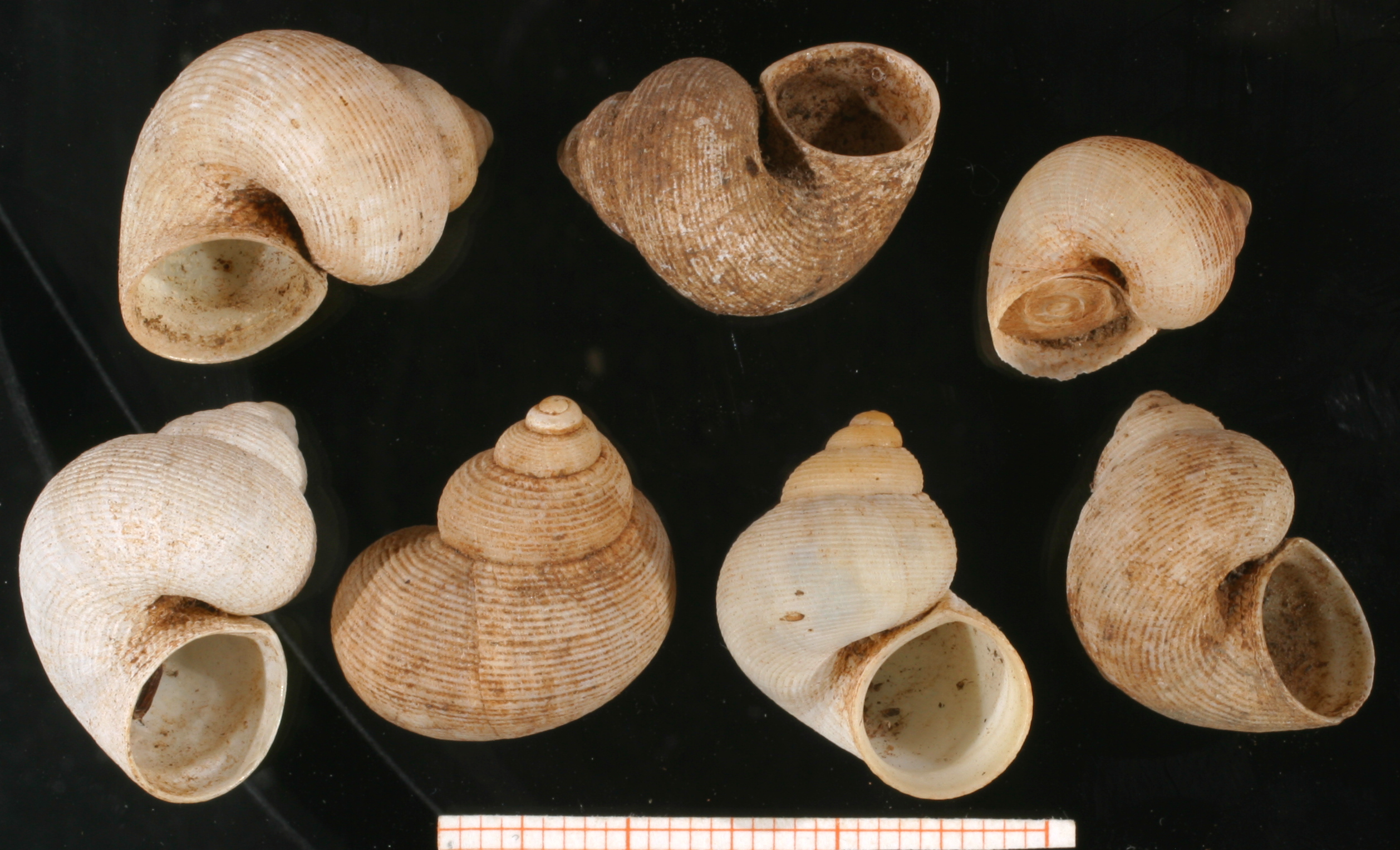

Scientific classification
- Kingdom: Animalia
- Phylum: Mollusca
- Class: Gastropoda
- Subclass: Caenogastropoda
- Order: Littorinimorpha
- Family: Pomatiidae
- Genus: Pomatias
- Species: P. rivularis

Binomial name
- Pomatias rivularis (Eichwald, 1829)

= Pomatias rivularis =

Species of gastropod

Pomatias rivularis is a species of gastropods belonging to the family Pomatiidae.

The species is found near Black Sea.
