= List of non-marine molluscs of Azerbaijan =

Location of Azerbaijan

The non-marine molluscs of Azerbaijan are a part of the molluscan fauna of Azerbaijan, which is part of the wildlife of Azerbaijan.

== Gastropods ==
As of 2025, 146 species of terrestrial gastropods (snails and slugs) can be found in Azerbaijan. These include:

Scientific name	Taxonid	Conservation Status
Pyrgula ebersini	189454	DD
Pyrgula pulla	189458	DD
Turricaspia pullula	189467	DD
Turricaspia caspia	189493	LC
Pyrgula nossovi	189508	DD
Turricaspia trivialis	189519	DD
Pseudamnicola brusiniana	189051	LC
Pyrgula isseli	189070	DD
Turricaspia dagestanica	189097	DD
Turricaspia triton	155871	LC
Pyrgula rudis	188922	DD
Pyrgula kolesnikoviana	189244	DD
Turricaspia conus	189262	DD
Pyrgula sowinskyi	189266	DD
Turricaspia sajenkovae	189280	DD
Pyrgula abichi	189305	DD
Pyrgula cincta	189385	DD
Pyrgula behningi	189386	DD
Turricaspia variabilis	155608	LC
Turricaspia spasskii	189404	DD
Anisus kolesnikovi	189408	LC
Caspiohydrobia gemmata	189439	DD

== Freshwater bivalves ==
Species of freshwater bivalves of Azerbaijan include:

== See also ==
Lists of molluscs of surrounding countries:

- List of non-marine molluscs of Russia
- List of non-marine molluscs of Georgia (country)
- List of non-marine molluscs of Armenia
- List of non-marine molluscs of Iran
