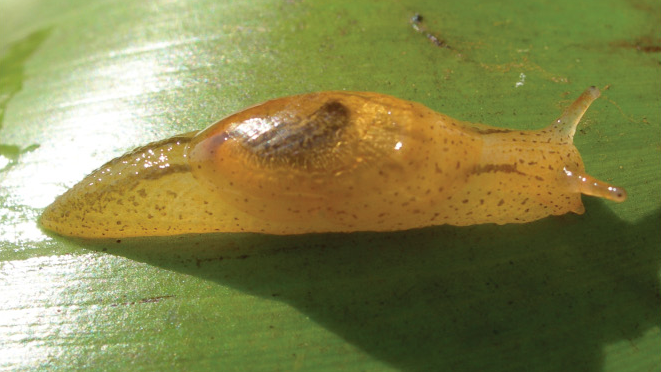
- Orange color variety of Omalonyx convexus

Scientific classification
- Kingdom: Animalia
- Phylum: Mollusca
- Class: Gastropoda
- Order: Stylommatophora
- Family: Succineidae
- Genus: Omalonyx
- Species: O. convexus

Binomial name
- Omalonyx convexus (Heynemann, 1868)

= Omalonyx convexus =

Species of gastropod

Omalonyx convexus is a species of air-breathing land snail, a terrestrial pulmonate gastropod mollusc in the family Succineidae, the amber snails. This species of snail is found on emergent vegetation in lentic environments, and also submerged among macrophytes.

== Distribution ==
The distribution of Omalonyx convexus includes Brazil.

== Description ==
Omalonyx convexus can be up to 4 cm in total length. Tegument and mantle coloring varies between milky-white, orange and beige. The tegument and mantle have irregularly sized and distributed blackish spots, which, depending on their quantity, can sometimes give the animal a dark gray appearance. Beige was the most commonly observed coloring (Arruda & Thomé). Because of their translucence, milky-white individuals sometimes display the same coloring as the substrate. Because of its wide variability in color, Omalonyx convexus can be confused with other Omalonyx species: Omalonyx matheronii, Omalonyx pattersonae and Omalonyx unguis.

The shell is translucent with a slightly amber tint, and it can be covered by the mantle to various extents. The shell was not completely covered by the mantle in any of the specimens observed by Arruda and Thomé.

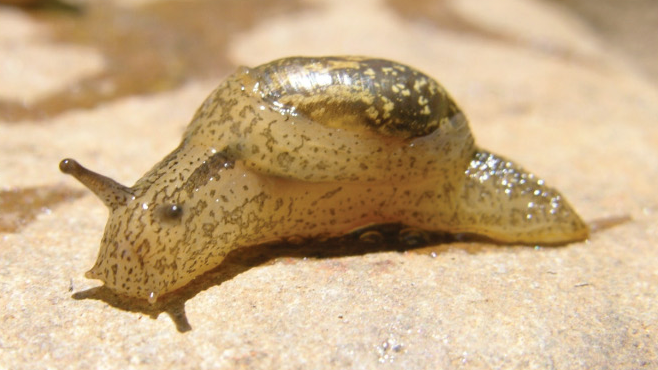
Beige colored Omalonyx convexus.

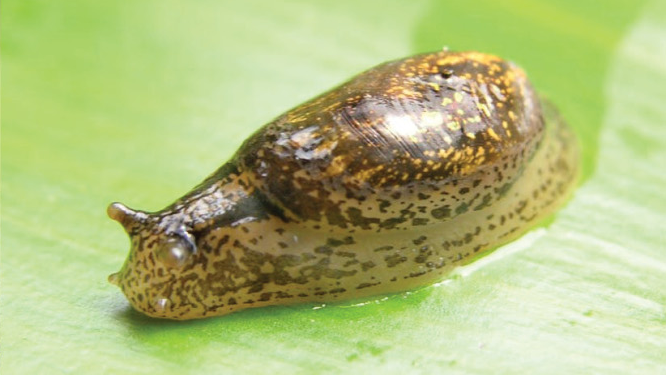
Beige colored Omalonyx convexus with a darkish-gray appearance.

== Ecology ==
=== Habitat ===
Arruda and Thomé found this species in both clean and polluted freshwater environments (polluted by household sewage), as well as on both natural and artificial substrates. The habitat of Omalonyx convexus includes vegetation bordering ditches used for rice paddy irrigation, drainage ditches, floodplains, lakes, rivers and streams. The species was also found on the dry portion of a semi-submerged tree in a temporarily flooded location. These snails are mainly seen on the macrophytes Eicchornia azurea, Salvinia auriculata, Pistia stratiotis and Eryngium species, but they were also found on artificial substrates such as canvas, cardboard, plastic bottles, tetra-pak boxes and styrofoam.

Arruda & Thomé reported that the snails are found on different substrate areas during the course of the day, a behavioral adaptation to guard against desiccation, since apparently the temperature change influences their choice of habitat substrates. In the early morning (between 7 a.m. and 10 a.m.) and at the end of the afternoon (between 4 p.m. and 6 p.m.) during sunny days, the animals were observed on the stem and on the adaxial surface of the macrophyte leaves, on grasses in flooded areas and under adjacent vegetation on the banks of dikes and lakes. In this last case, they were well camouflaged, and it was very difficult to find them. During the hottest hours of the day (between 10 a.m. and 4 p.m.), they were found on flowers, roots, abaxial surface of leaves, and close to the base of macrophyte flowers.

=== Feeding habits ===
Their diet is basically plant tissues, although pollen grains and non-vegetal food items (mites) were also found in their crop contents.
