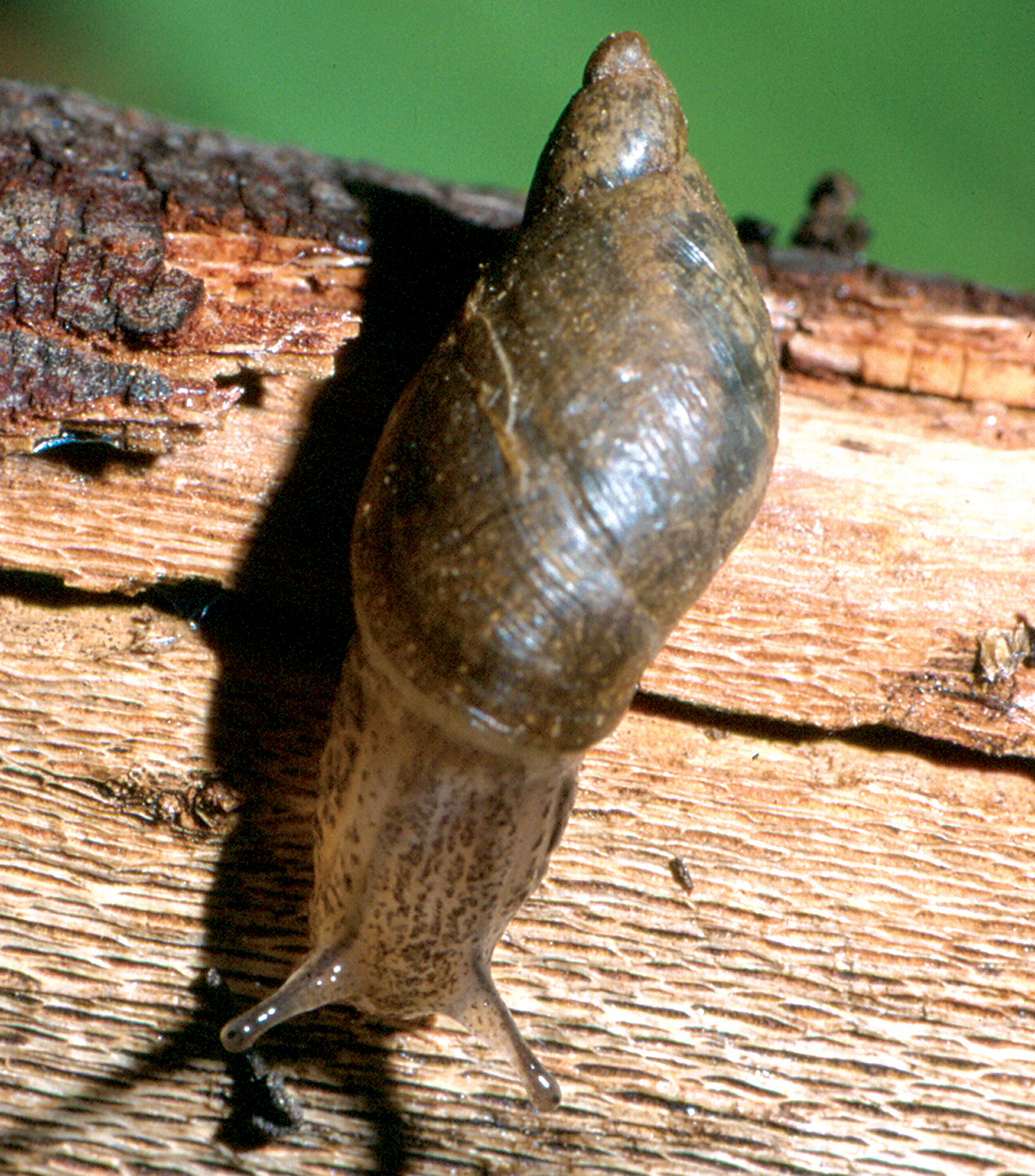
- A Kanab ambersnail at Vasey's Paradise in Grand Canyon National Park.

Conservation status
- Critically Endangered (IUCN 3.1)

- Critically Imperiled (NatureServe)

Scientific classification
- Kingdom: Animalia
- Phylum: Mollusca
- Class: Gastropoda
- Order: Stylommatophora
- Family: Succineidae
- Genus: Oxyloma
- Species: O. haydeni
- Subspecies: O. h. kanabense

Trinomial name
- Oxyloma haydeni kanabense Pilsbry, 1948
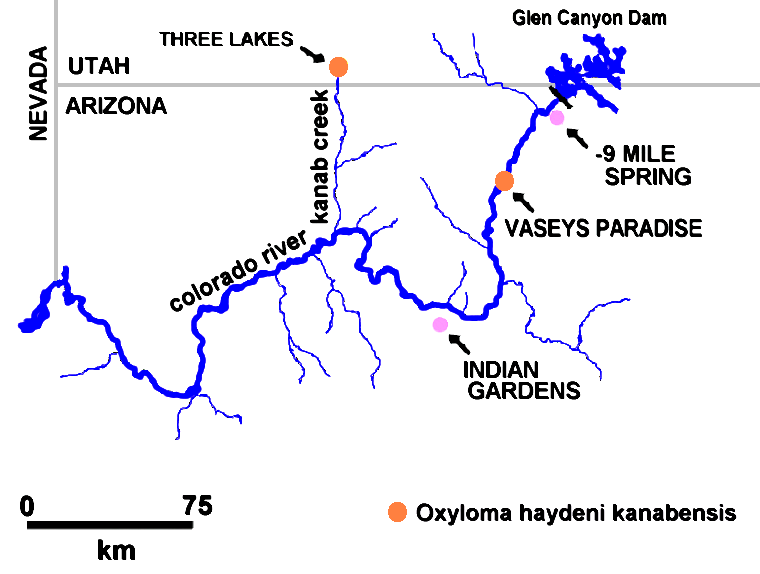
- Habitat of the Kanab ambersnail (marked in orange)

Synonyms
- Oxyloma kanabense Pilsbry, 1948

= Kanab ambersnail =

Subspecies of gastropod

The Kanab ambersnail, formerly classified as Oxyloma haydeni kanabense or Oxyloma kanabense, is a small, air-breathing land snail belonging to the family Succineidae. This terrestrial pulmonate gastropod mollusc was previously considered a critically endangered subspecies or species. In 2013, a scientific investigations report by the United States Geological Survey concluded that the Kanab ambersnail is not a genetically distinct species. In June 2021, the United States Fish and Wildlife Service removed the Kanab ambersnail from the United States Fish and Wildlife Service list of endangered mammals and birds and classified it with other common ambersnails within the same taxa, officially negating its status as a distinct subspecies.

The common name of the amber snails is based on the shell, which is translucent and when empty usually resembles the color of amber.

This snail is endemic to the United States, specifically the states of Arizona and Utah, where it was first collected in the early 20th century. This snail lives in wetlands, springs, and seeps, and only two of its natural habitats are known to exist: Three Lakes, a meadow near Kanab, Utah, and Vasey's Paradise, a spring along the Colorado River within Grand Canyon National Park. In its natural habitat it is polyphagous, feeding mainly on bacteria, plants and fungi. It reproduces during the summer.

Previously considered a critically endangered species on the IUCN Red List of Threatened Species due to a series of factors (including anthropic influence), the Kanab ambersnail had been reintroduced to three springs above the historic high water level along the Colorado River.

The snail had been listed as endangered on the United States Fish and Wildlife Service list of endangered species in 1991. In June 2021, following genetic testing that showed it was never a distinct subspecies, the Fish and Wildlife Service delisted the Kanab ambersnail from the federal endangered species list.

== Taxonomy ==
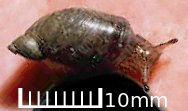
An ambersnail crawls across a hand, next to a U.S. dime (18 mm / 0.7 in diameter).

Kanab ambersnails were first collected in 1909 by James Ferriss from "The Greens", 10 kilometers (6.2 mi) above Kanab, Utah on Kanab Wash, on a wet ledge among moss and Cypripediums. These specimens were originally thought to belong to the species Succinea hawkinsi until 1948, when Pilsbry transferred them to the genus Oxyloma as a subspecies (kanabensis) of the species haydeni. In 1991, Arthur Clarke, an American malacologist, noted that Pilsbry's decision was "preliminary" and that, as Pilsbry himself noted, "its taxonomic status should be reevaluated." He suggested that the Kanab ambersnail may deserves full species status, a position also supported by Shi-Kuei Wu, a Zoologist of the Colorado Museum of Natural History, in 1995. Earle Spamer, an American naturalist, defended Pilsbry's classification in 1994. He stated that, although current published mollusk checklists (Turgeon et al. 1988 and Groombridge 1993) treat the Kanab ambersnail at species level rather that as a subspecies, the taxon should continue to be called by its original name until criteria to designate the taxon as a separate species are published.

=== Delisting ===
In 2013, a report from the United States Geological Survey (USGS) concluded that the Kanab ambersnail does not represent a genetically distinct species. In January 2020, the United States Fish and Wildlife Service (FWS) published a proposal removing the Kanab ambersnail from the Federal List of Endangered Species due to "taxonomic error". In June 2021, the FWS removed of the Kanab ambersnail from the endangered species list for not being a distinct subspecies.

== Description ==
The Kanab ambersnail is a terrestrial snail in the family Succineidae (ambersnails). The shell has a light amber color when empty but a mottled grayish-amber to yellowish-amber color on the live snail. The shell is dextral (right-handed spiral), thin-walled, with an elevated spire and a Daly, patulous (expanded) aperture. Fully mature individuals are about 14 to 19 mm (0.5 to 0.75 inch) long, 7 to 9 mm (0.25 to 0.33 inch) in diameter, with 3.25 to 3.75 whorls in a drawn out spire. The snail's eyes are located at the ends of long peduncles (stalks), while the tentacles are reduced to small protuberances at the base of the eye stalks.

== Ecology ==
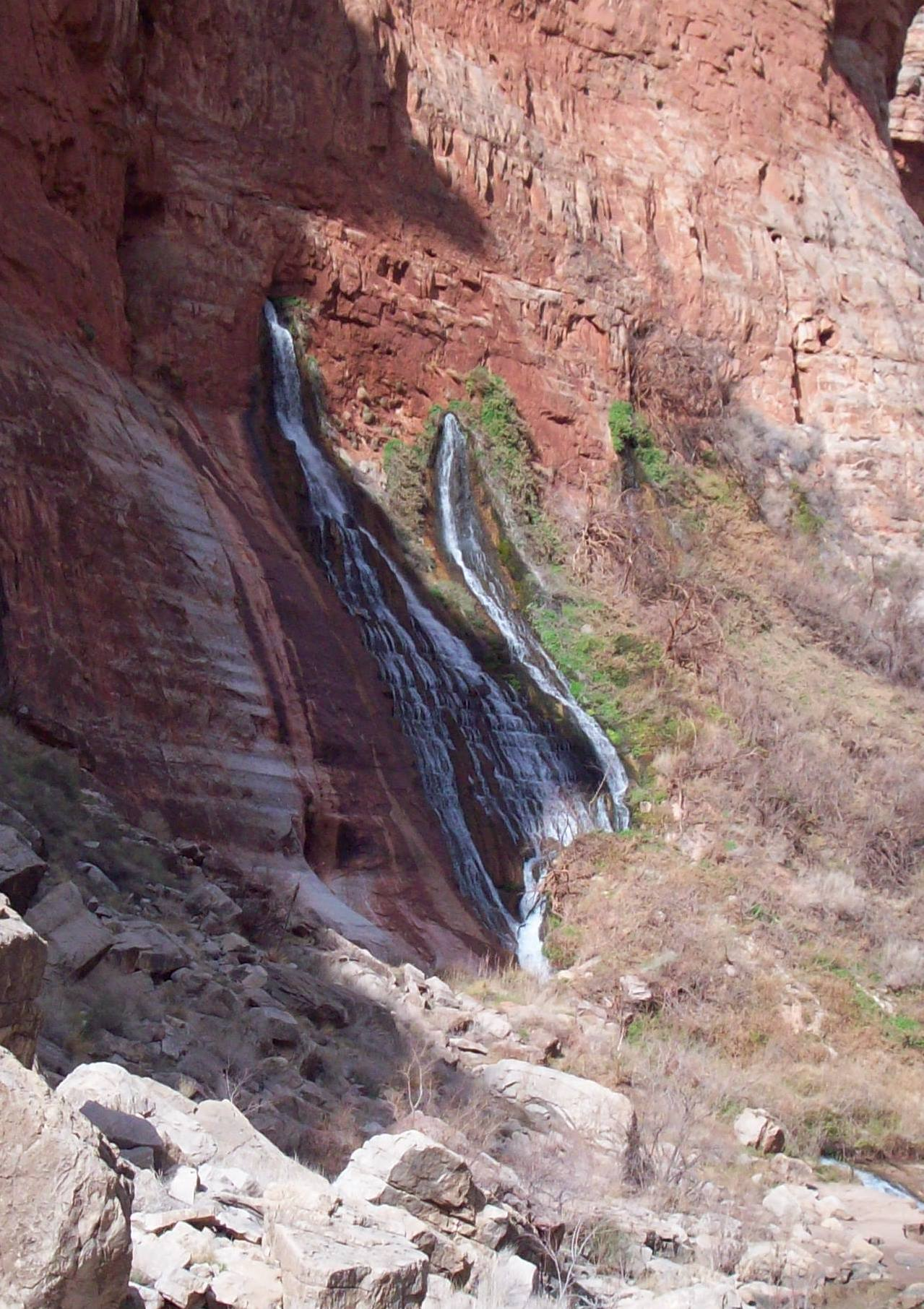
Vasey's Paradise, one of the two natural habitats of the Kanab ambersnail.

The natural predators of this snail are deer mice and passerines such as the American robin.

=== Habitat ===
Three Lakes, a privately owned wet meadow near Kanab, is one of only two natural habitats for the Kanab ambersnail. The snail's habitat is threatened by commercial development by the owner of Three Lakes, Best Friends Animal Society.

In 1996, 16% of the Kanab ambersnail's habitat at Vasey's Paradise, an oasis in Grand Canyon National Park, was destroyed in a flood. A more disastrous flood in 1994 had probably already threatened the snail's habitat. The suitable area for the snail's habitat in Three Lakes is believed to extend to an area 1.3 km long, and 90 m wide, and genetic diversity seems to indicate that the area is more stable than Vasey's Paradise. However the snail's redistribution is also affected by the presence of their host plants and rock ledges.

Despite being air-breathing snails, Kanab ambersnails can survive for up to 32 hours in cold, highly oxygenated water, which may have helped them to disperse around the Colorado Valley area since a controlled release in 1998.

=== Feeding habits ===
The Kanab ambersnail is typically found on the scarlet monkeyflower (Erythranthe cardinalis) and watercress (Nasturtium officinale), but also sedges and rushes. It feeds on plant tissue, fungi, algae, and bacteria, using its radula to scrape off food.

=== Life cycle ===
Like all pulmonate land snails, ambersnails are hermaphroditic, having both male and female reproductive systems, and are believed to be capable of self-fertilization. They live between 12 and 15 months in the wild. Young snails enter dormancy between October and November, becoming active again in March and April. Mature snails reproduce in the summer months.

== Population ==
Only two wild populations of the snail are known to exist, specifically, Three Lakes near Kanab, Utah and Vasey's Paradise. The latter was not discovered until 1991 when a survey of mollusks in the area was conducted. There was formerly a third population present in Kanab, Utah, but it is believed to have become extirpated, due to the destruction of its habitat.

In the 2013 Culver et al. study, scientists from the Fish and WIldlife service collected 14 ambersnails from 12 locations in Arizona and Utah, including "Kanab ambersnail, Niobrara ambersnail, blunt ambersnail (Oxyloma retusum), undescribed species of Oxyloma, and individuals from Catinella (used to provide an outgroup comparison)." This study included samples from all three extant populations identified as Kanab ambersnail. Between the Oxyloma populations, shell morphology did not have the variation usually associated with different species, leading the authors to state that none of the 12 populations sampled was reproductively isolated from the others.

== Conservation ==
In November 1991, Kanab ambersnail was proposed for emergency listing by the United States Fish and Wildlife Service. The Kanab ambersnail had been included United States Fish and Wildlife Service list of endangered mammals and birds since April 1992.

The Kanab ambersnail was previously evaluated as Critically Endangered on the IUCN Red List of Threatened Species.

Reintroduction releases were conducted at three sites along the Colorado river, each releasing 150 snails. The first of these releases was conducted in September 1998, and all sites were sufficiently high enough to not be flooded by normal dam activity. A second release was conducted at the same three sites in July 1999 to boost population densities and improve genetic variability, but only one of the three sites, Upper Elves Chasm, has established a new population.

In Utah, its habitat is threatened by commercial development, whereas the Grand Canyon population is threatened by discharges from the Glen Canyon Dam which can sweep the snail and its habitat downstream.

=== Post Delisting ===
With the delisting, the previously applied prohibitions and conservation measures under the Act ceased to apply to the snail formerly known as the Kanab ambersnail. The change in status also lifted restrictions on interstate commerce, import, and export related to the snail. Additionally, Federal agencies are no longer mandated to consult under section 7 of the Act regarding actions that may potentially affect the snails previously identified as Kanab ambersnail or their habitat. The deregulation reflects the updated understanding of the snail's taxonomy and its alignment with other common ambersnails within the same taxa.
