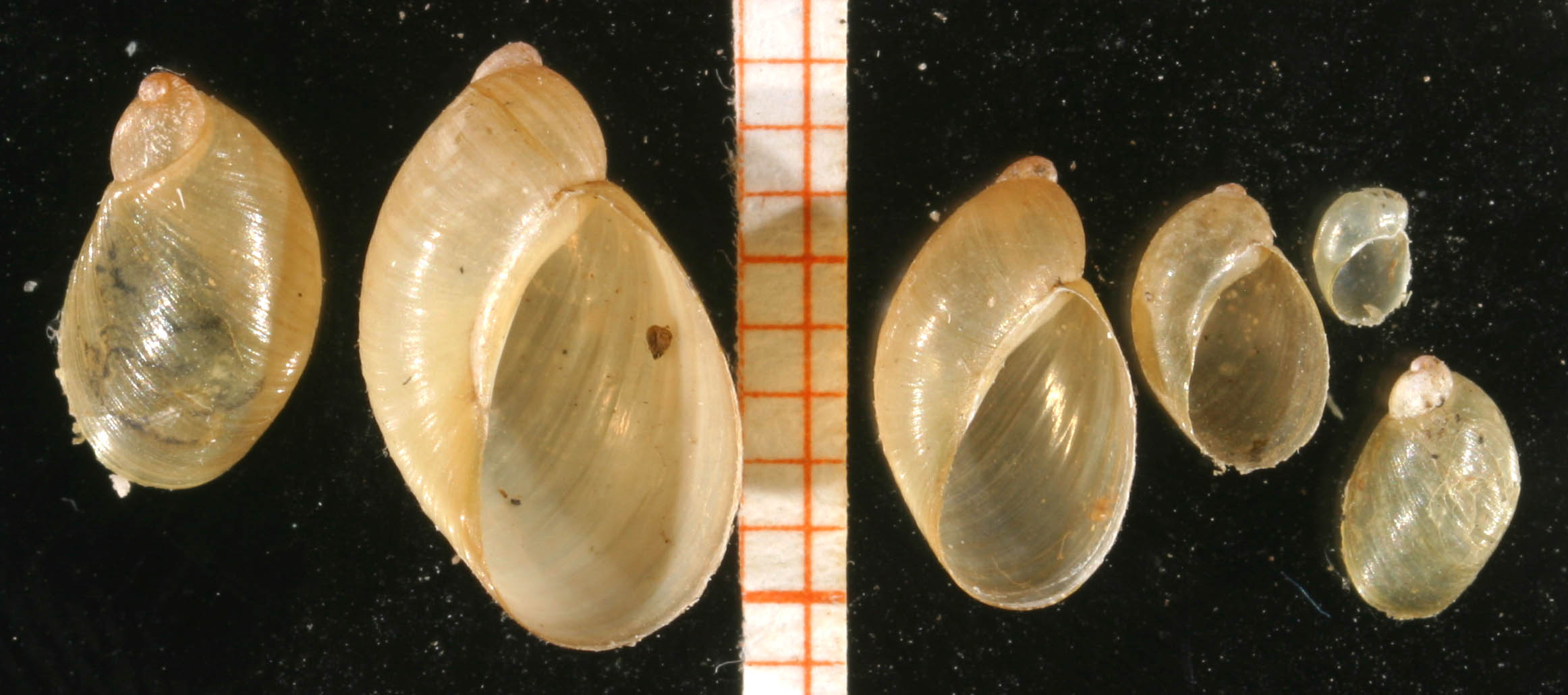

Scientific classification
- Domain: Eukaryota
- Kingdom: Animalia
- Phylum: Mollusca
- Class: Gastropoda
- Order: Stylommatophora
- Family: Succineidae
- Genus: Oxyloma
- Species: O. sarsii

Binomial name
- Oxyloma sarsii (Esmark & Hoyer, 1886)

= Oxyloma sarsii =

Species of gastropod

Oxyloma sarsii is a species of small European land snail, a terrestrial pulmonate gastropod mollusk belonging to the family Succineidae, the amber snails.

== Description ==
Only reliably separated from the very similar Oxyloma elegans by dissection

== Distribution ==
This species is known to occur in a number of European countries and islands including:

- Great Britain
- Ireland
- Netherlands
- Poland
- Bulgaria
- Ukraine
- and other areas

== Habitat ==
This snail lives at the water line, at the edges of rivers and lakes.
