= Niobrara ambersnail =

Scientific classification
- Kingdom: Animalia
- Phylum: Mollusca
- Class: Gastropoda
- Order: Stylommatophora
- Family: Succineidae
- Genus: Oxyloma
- Species: O. haydeni
- Subspecies: O. h. haydeni

Trinomial name
- Oxyloma haydeni haydeni (W. G. Binney, 1858)

Subspecies of gastropod

Oxyloma haydeni haydeni, common name the Niobrara ambersnail, is a subspecies of small, air-breathing land snail, a terrestrial pulmonate gastropod mollusc in the family Succineidae, the amber snails.

The Kanab ambersnail is often regarded as a subspecies of this species. As with other species of ambersnail, it is distinguished by slight differences in shell morphology.

== Distribution ==
The snail is found in Northern Arizona and the Kanab Canyon area of southern Utah. It is also found in Wyoming, where it is classed as one of the species in greatest conservation need.
