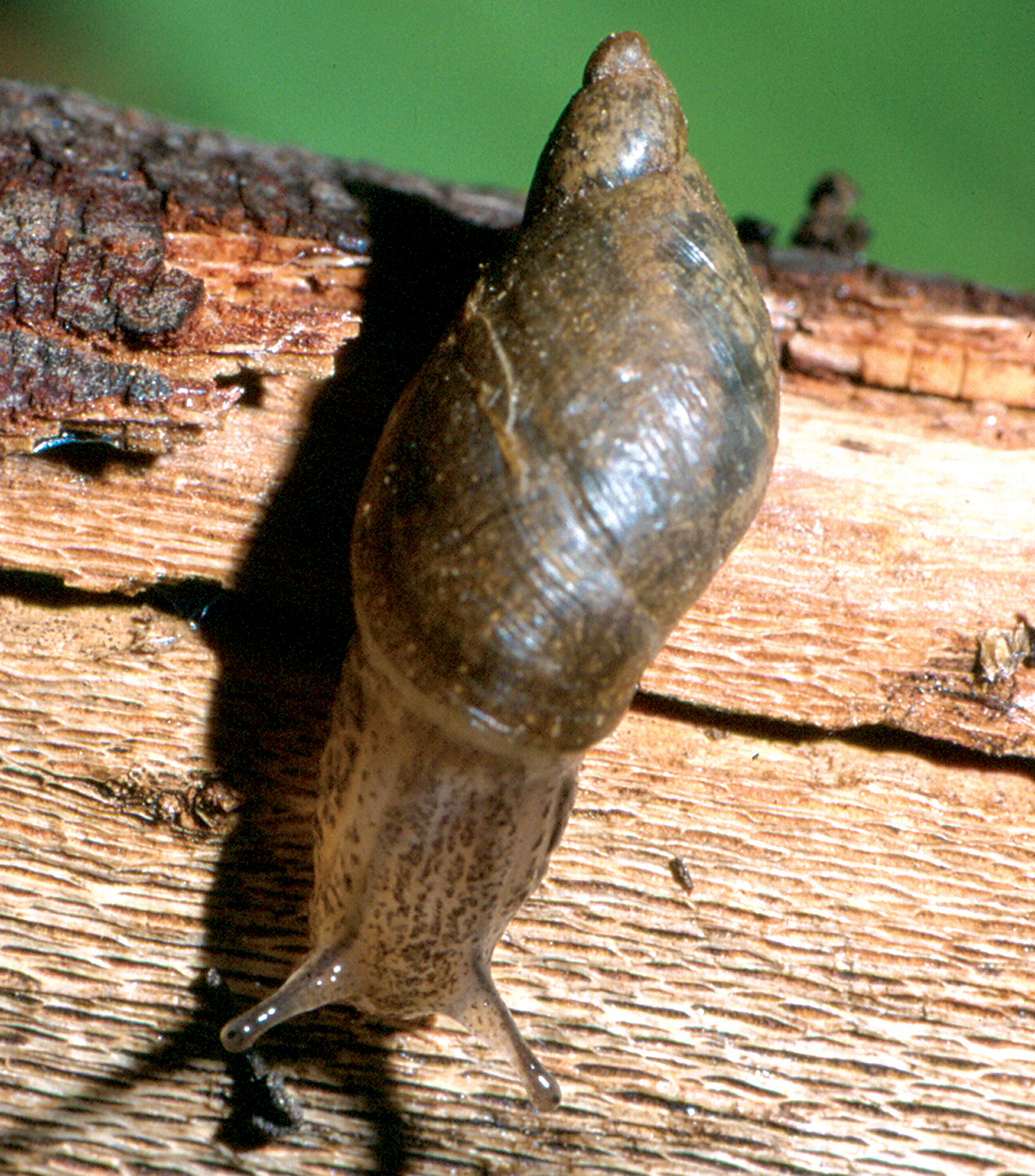
- A live individual of Oxyloma haydeni kanabensis

Conservation status
- Vulnerable (NatureServe)

Scientific classification
- Kingdom: Animalia
- Phylum: Mollusca
- Class: Gastropoda
- Order: Stylommatophora
- Family: Succineidae
- Genus: Oxyloma
- Species: O. haydeni

Binomial name
- Oxyloma haydeni (W. G. Binney, 1858)

= Oxyloma haydeni =

Species of gastropod

Oxyloma haydeni is a species of small, air-breathing land snail, a terrestrial pulmonate gastropod mollusc in the family Succineidae, the amber snails. A subspecies of this species is protected after having been ecognized as endangered.

== Subspecies ==
- Oxyloma haydeni haydeni (W. G. Binney, 1858) - Niobrara ambersnail
- Oxyloma haydeni kanabensis (Pilsbry, 1948) - Kanab ambersnail an endangered subspecies
