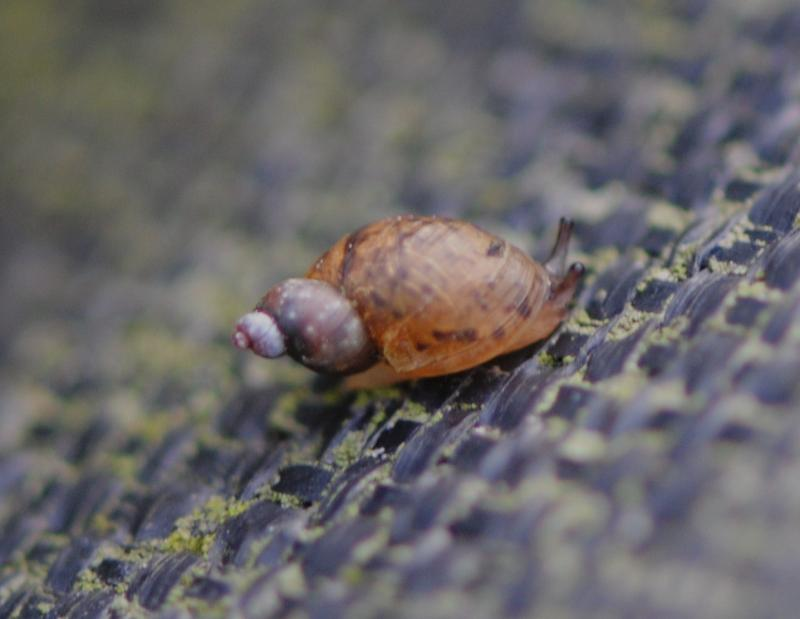

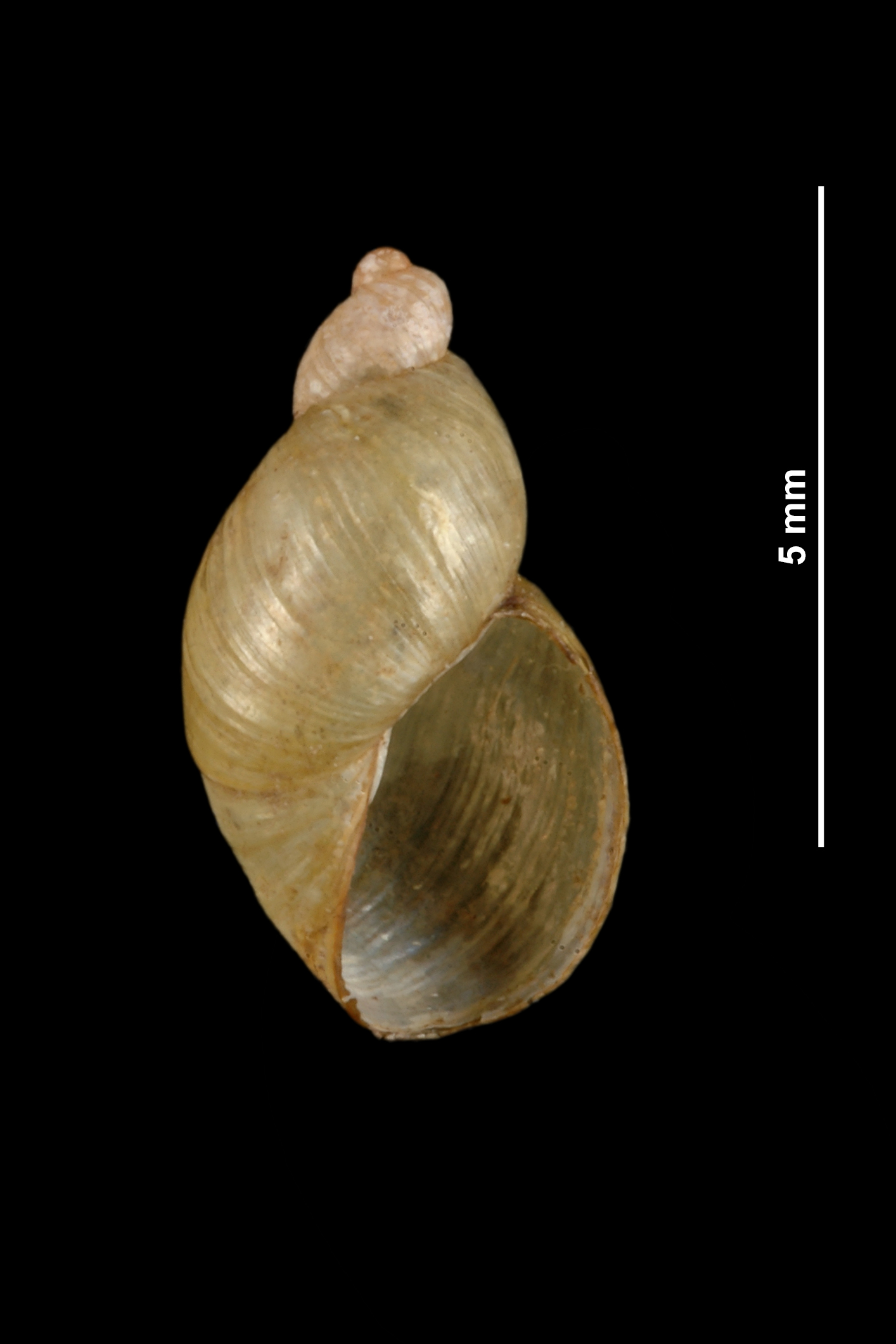
- Shell of Succinella oblonga (specimen at MNHN, Paris)

Scientific classification
- Kingdom: Animalia
- Phylum: Mollusca
- Class: Gastropoda
- Order: Stylommatophora
- Family: Succineidae
- Genus: Succinella
- Species: S. oblonga

Binomial name
- Succinella oblonga (Draparnaud, 1801)

Synonyms
- Succinea (Amphibina) oblonga Draparnaud, 1801; † Succinea (Amphibina) paludinaeformis F. Sandberger, 1873 (junior subjective synonym); Succinea (Succinella) oblonga (Draparnaud, 1801) (unaccepted combination); Succinea oblonga Draparnaud, 1801 (original combination); † Succinea oblonga var. schumacheri Andreae, 1884 (junior subjective synonym)

= Succinella oblonga =

Species of gastropod

Succinella oblonga is a species of air-breathing land snail, a terrestrial pulmonate gastropod mollusc in the family Succineidae.

Succinella oblonga is the type species of the genus Succinella.

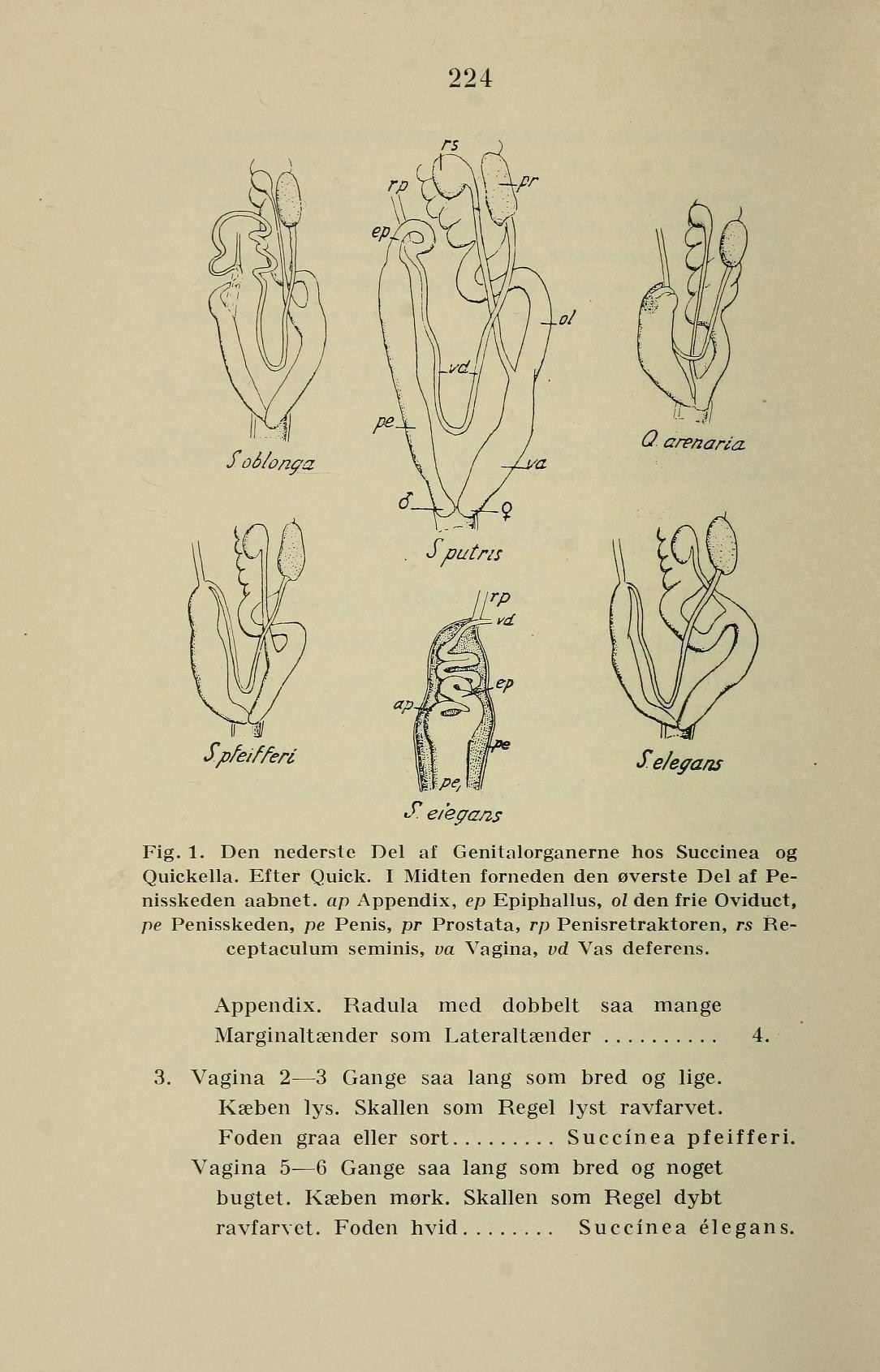
Catinella arenaria genitalia in Danmarks Fauna

== Description ==
The shell is c. 8 mm in height and up 4.5 mm wide. It has 3 to 3½ strongly arched whorls which are set off from each other by a deep suture. The last whorl is highly inflated, the aperture height occupying about half of the total height. The shell is dextral and relatively thick-walled. The shell is opaque, the surface is matte. The colour is amber on the coast, inland it is rather pale yellowish grey to greenish white in colour. The surface is rough and bears somewhat irregular growth bands. Often the surface layer is camouflaged with dirt or droppings. The animal is mostly grey in colour.

The shell closely resembles that of Quickella arenaria. These two species are separated by anatomical differences: S. oblonga has a long penis with an epiphallus, long vas deferens and no black spot at the insertion of retractor at the penis.

== Distribution ==
This species lives throughout Europe, including but not limited to Latvia, Bulgaria, Slovakia, Poland, the Czech Republic, Ukraine, Netherlands, Great Britain, and Ireland.
