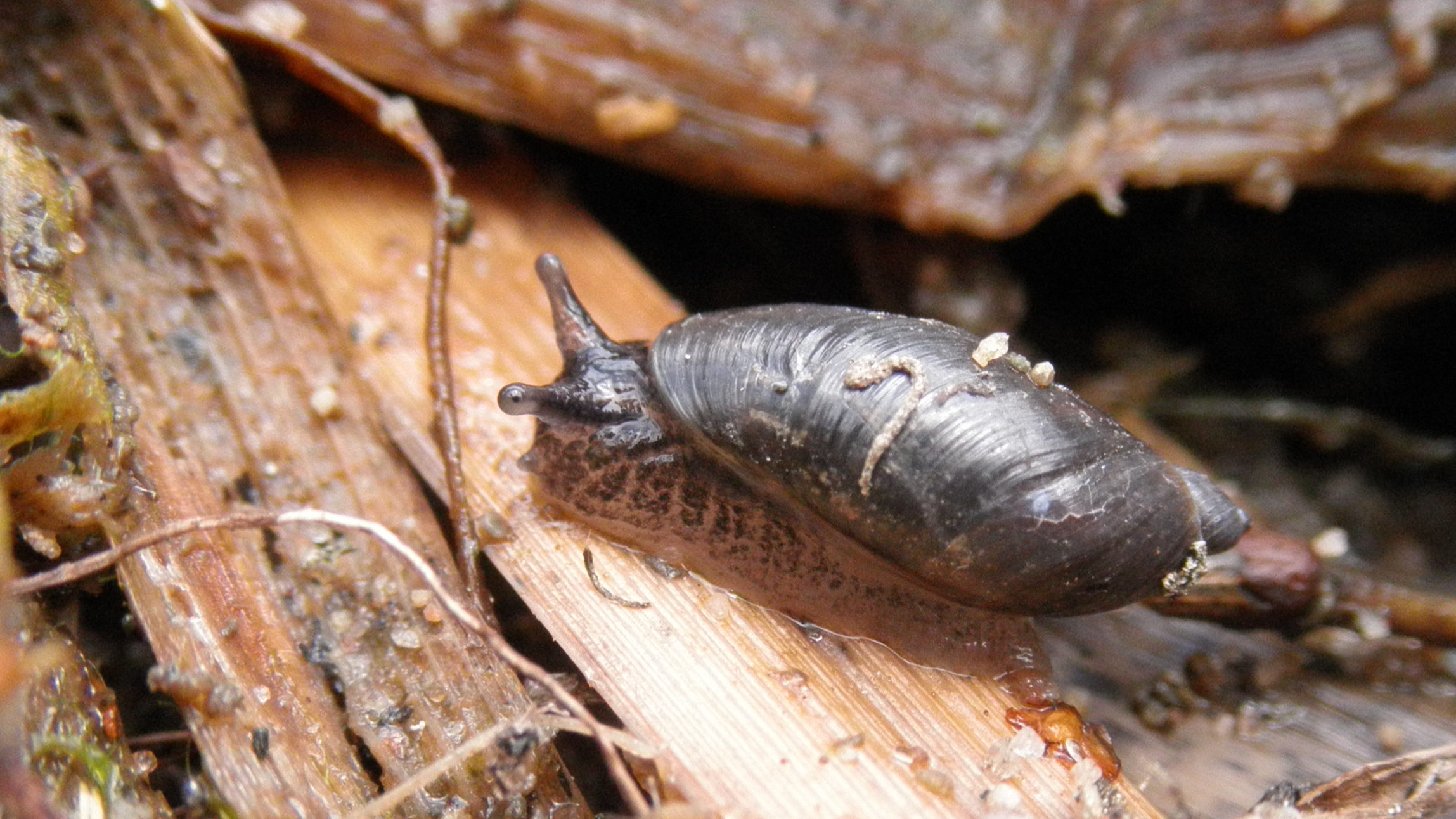

Scientific classification
- Domain: Eukaryota
- Kingdom: Animalia
- Phylum: Mollusca
- Class: Gastropoda
- Order: Stylommatophora
- Family: Succineidae
- Genus: Oxyloma
- Species: O. elegans

Binomial name
- Oxyloma elegans (Risso, 1826)

Synonyms
- Succinea elegans Risso, 1826; Succinea pfeifferi Rossmässler, 1835; Oxyloma dunkeri

= Oxyloma elegans =

Species of gastropod

Oxyloma elegans is a species of small European land snail, a terrestrial pulmonate gastropod mollusk belonging to the family Succineidae, the amber snails.

== Description ==
The shell usually has fewer than 3 whorls. The body whorl is very large and the spire is short. The shell is yellowish amber coloured with irregular radial growth lines. The width of the shell is 6–8 mm. The height of the shell is 9–17 mm (up to 20 mm).

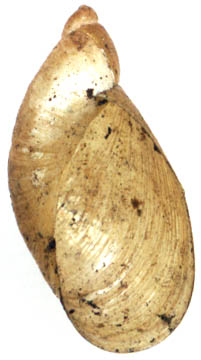
Apertural view of a shell of Oxyloma elegans

Genitalia differences separate Oxyloma elegans from Oxyloma sarsii and the genus Succinea. The epiphallus is slightly curved and inside a short penis prolongation distance between penis and the pedunculus is very short.

== Ecology ==
Oxyloma elegans occurs on vegetation in moist habitats such as marshes.

== Distribution ==
This species occurs in European countries and islands including:

- Great Britain
- Ireland
- Czech Republic - nearly threatened (NT)
- Poland
- Russia - Sverdlovsk oblast
- Ukraine
- Slovakia
- Bulgaria
