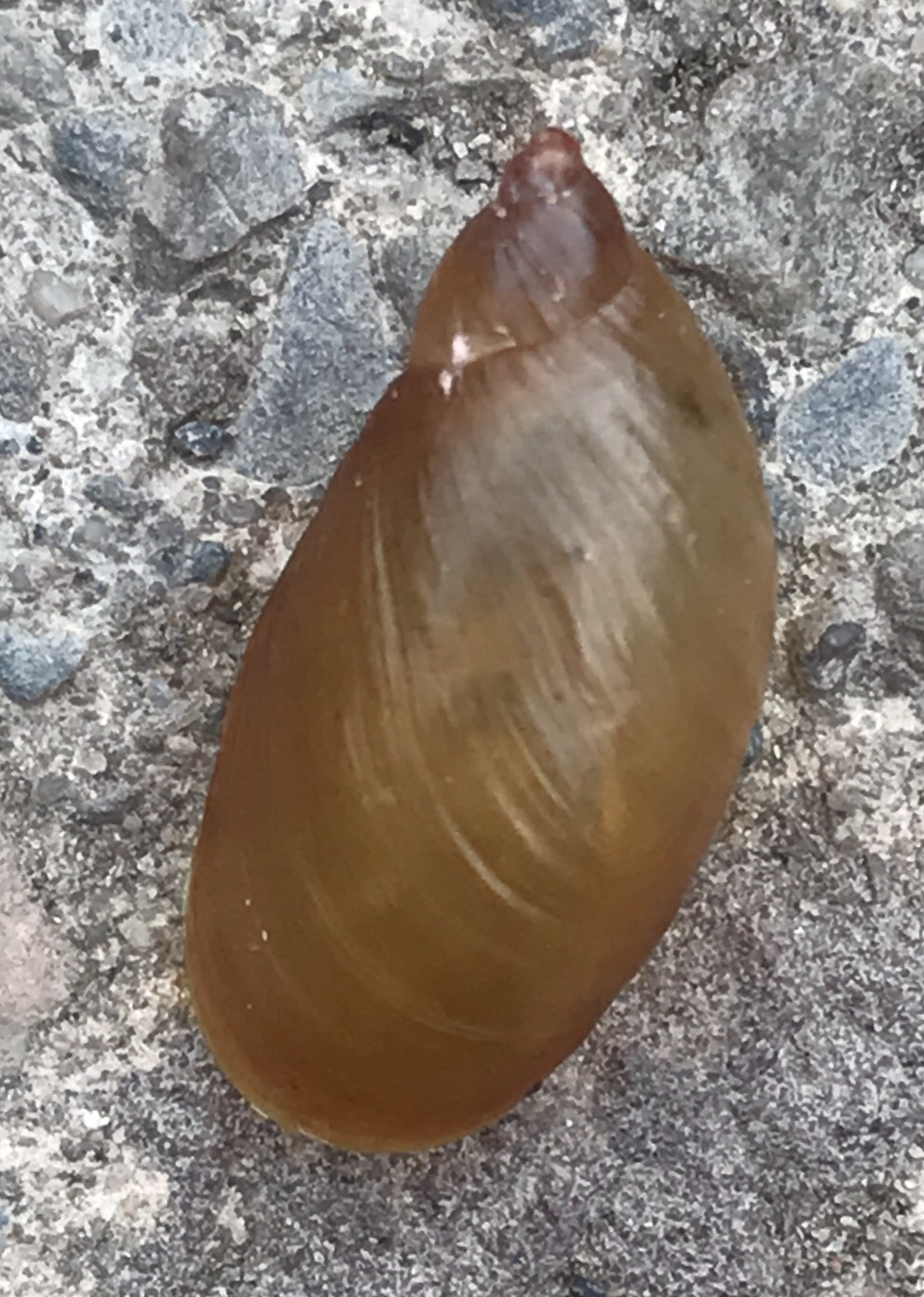
- Oxyloma retusum shell

Conservation status
- Secure (NatureServe)

Scientific classification
- Kingdom: Animalia
- Phylum: Mollusca
- Class: Gastropoda
- Order: Stylommatophora
- Family: Succineidae
- Genus: Oxyloma
- Species: O. retusum

Binomial name
- Oxyloma retusum (Lea, 1834)

Synonyms
- Oxyloma retusa (Lea, 1834); Succinea calumetensis Calkins, 1878; Succinea higginsi Tryon, 1866; Succinea higginsi Bland, 1866; Succinea retusa I. Lea, 1834

= Oxyloma retusum =

Species of gastropod

Oxyloma retusum, common name the blunt ambersnail, is a species of small land snail, a terrestrial pulmonate gastropod mollusk belonging to the family Succineidae.

== Distribution ==
This species occurs in North America.

== Biology ==
This snail eats dead and green plants in the summer, and only dead plants during the winter.
