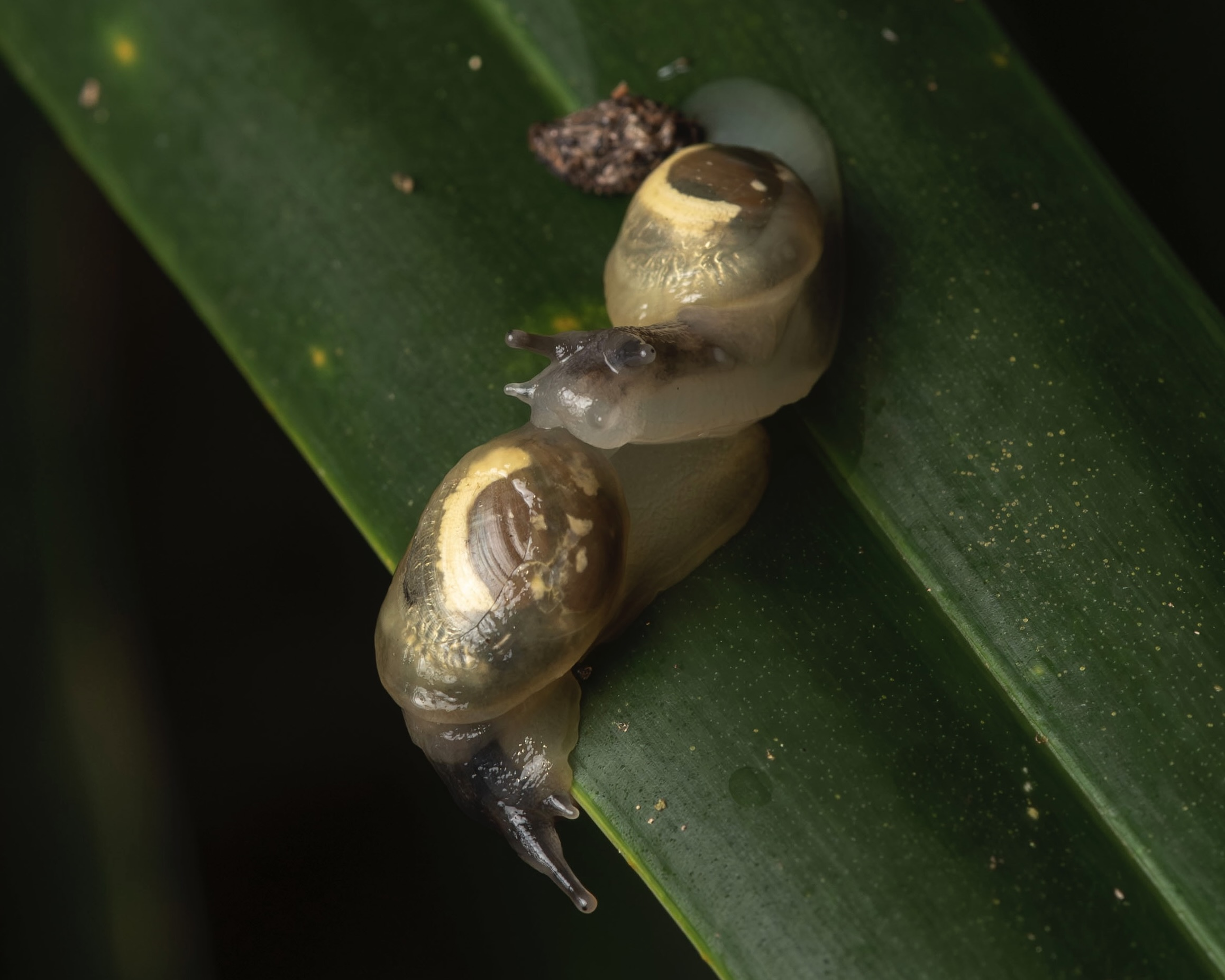

Conservation status
- Vulnerable (IUCN 2.3)

Scientific classification
- Kingdom: Animalia
- Phylum: Mollusca
- Class: Gastropoda
- Order: Stylommatophora
- Family: Succineidae
- Genus: Boninosuccinea
- Species: B. ogasawarae

Binomial name
- Boninosuccinea ogasawarae (Pilsbry, 1901)

= Boninosuccinea ogasawarae =

Species of gastropod

Boninosuccinea ogasawarae is a species of air-breathing land snail, a terrestrial gastropod mollusc in the family Succineidae, the amber snails.

== Distribution ==
This species of amber snail is endemic to Japan.
