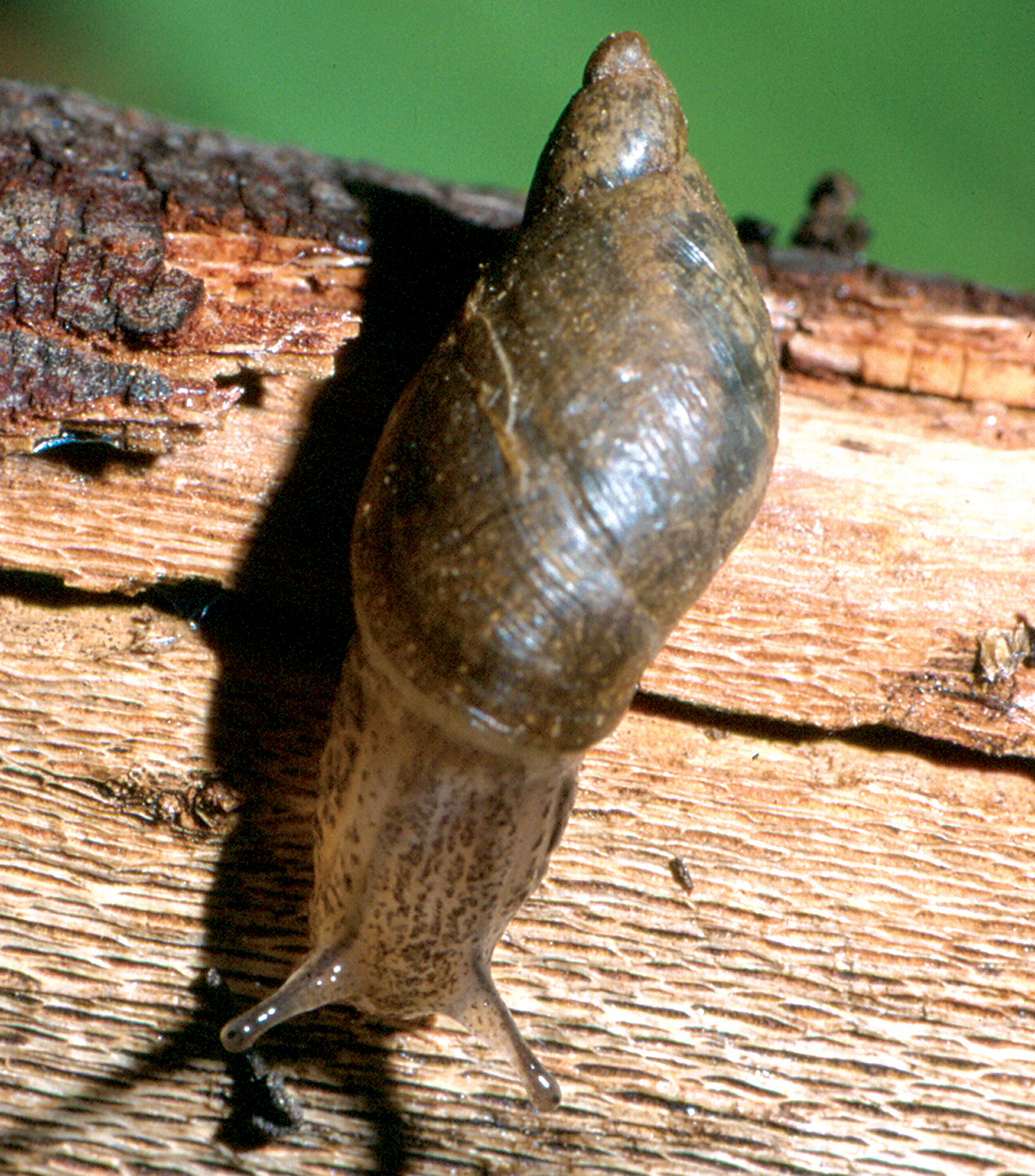
- A Kanab Ambersnail at Vaseys Paradise in Grand Canyon National Park.

Scientific classification
- Kingdom: Animalia
- Phylum: Mollusca
- Class: Gastropoda
- Order: Stylommatophora
- Family: Succineidae
- Subfamily: Oxylomatinae; Schileyko & Likharev, 1986
- Genus: Oxyloma; Westerlund, 1885

= Oxyloma =

Genus of gastropods

The Jurassic Astartidae clam erroneously named Oxyloma by Gardner and Campbell in 2002 is now known as Oxyeurax.

Oxyloma is a genus of air-breathing land snails, terrestrial pulmonate gastropod mollusks in the family Succineidae, the ambersnails.

== Species ==
The genus Oxyloma includes the following species and subspecies:

- Oxyloma decampi - Marshall ambersnail
- Oxyloma deprimidum
- Oxyloma elegans (Risso, 1826)
- Oxyloma effusum - coastal plain ambersnail
- Oxyloma groenlandicum - ruddy ambersnail
- Oxyloma hawkinsi - boundary ambersnail
- Oxyloma haydeni (W. G. Binney, 1858)
  - Oxyloma haydeni haydeni (W. G. Binney, 1858) - Niobrara ambersnail
  - Oxyloma haydeni kanabense (Pilsbry, 1948) - Kanab ambersnail
- Oxyloma missoula Hubricht, 1982 - ninepipes ambersnail
- Oxyloma nuttallianum - oblique ambersnail
- Oxyloma patentissimum (Pfeiffer, 1853)
- Oxyloma peoriense - depressed ambersnail
- Oxyloma retusum (Lea, 1834) - blunt ambersnail
- Oxyloma sarsii (Esmark & Hoyer, 1886)
- Oxyloma salleanum - Louisiana ambersnail
- Oxyloma sillimani - Humboldt ambersnail
- Oxyloma subeffusum - Chesapeake ambersnail
- Oxyloma verrilli - maritime ambersnail
- Oxyloma hirasei (Pilsbry, 1901)

== Conservation status ==
The only Oxyloma species or subspecies listed in the IUCN Red List of 2006 is the Kanab ambersnail (Oxyloma haydeni kanabense), which is critically endangered. No others have been assessed by the IUCN.

The Niobrara ambersnail (Oxyloma haydeni haydeni) is listed as a "Wyoming Species of Greatest Conservation Need" by the Wyoming Game and Fish Department.
