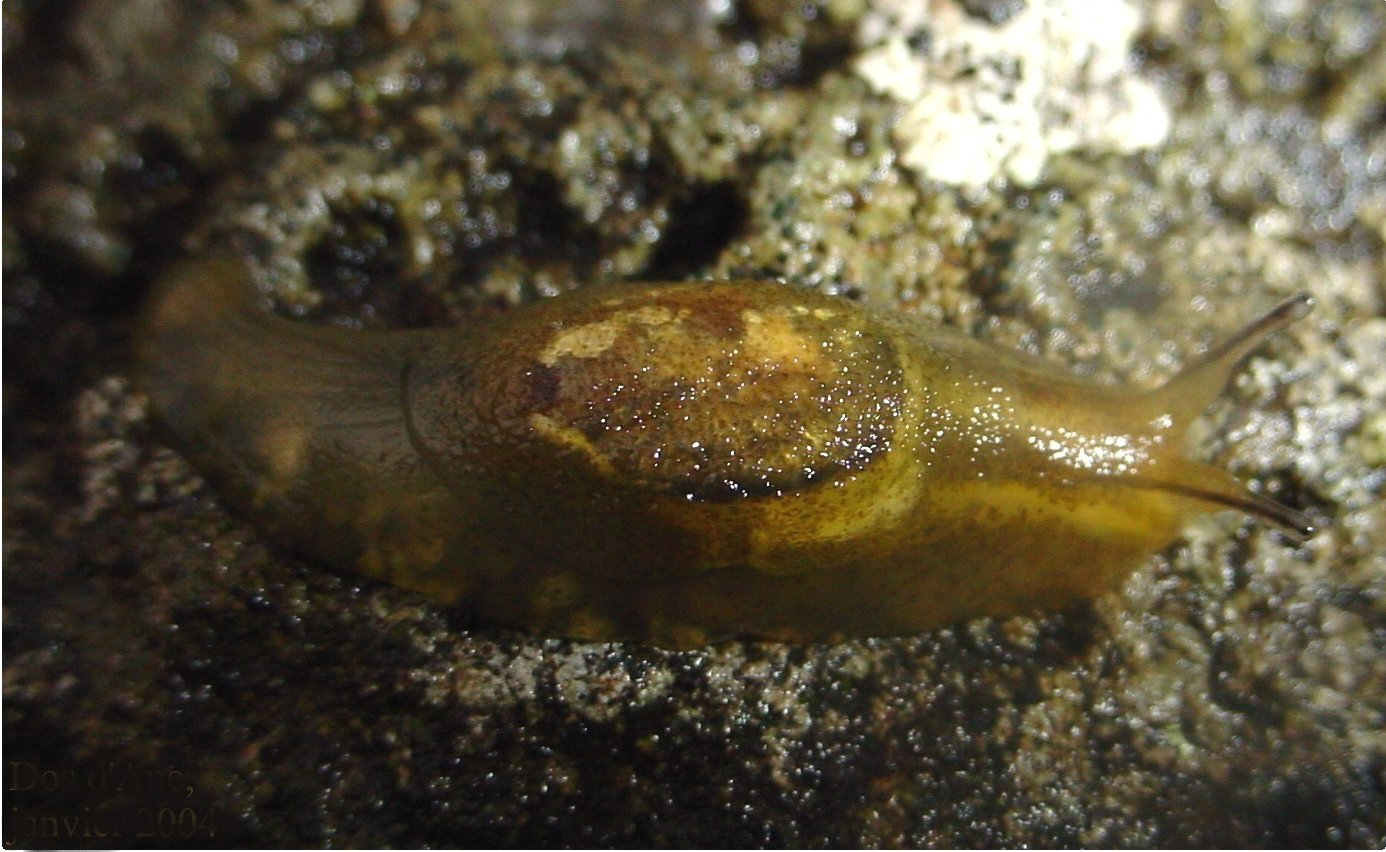
- A live animal of Hyalimax maillardi

Scientific classification
- Kingdom: Animalia
- Phylum: Mollusca
- Class: Gastropoda
- Order: Stylommatophora
- Family: Succineidae
- Genus: Hyalimax; H. Adams & A. Adams, 1855

Species
- See text

= Hyalimax =

Genus of gastropods

Hyalimax is a genus of small, air-breathing, land slugs, terrestrial pulmonate gastropod molluscs in the family Succineidae, the amber snails. This genus has no external shell, but it has an almost flat internal shell plate.

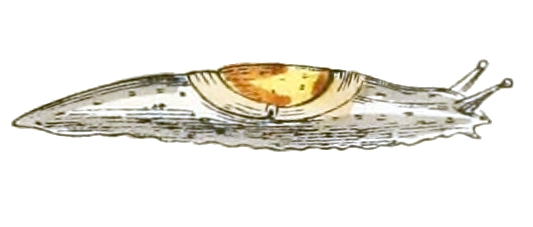
Hyalimax pellucidus according to Tryon (1884)

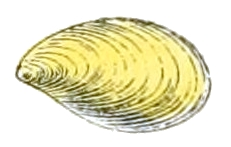
The internal shell of Hyalimax pellucidus according to Tryon (1884)

== Species ==
Species in the genus Hyalimax include (old source from 1892 was used, some of these names may be synonyms):

- Hyalimax andamanicus Godwin-Austen, 1882 - from Port Blair, Andaman Islands.
- Hyalimax maillardi Fischer, 1867
- Hyalimax mauritianus Rang, 1827 - from Mauritius.
- Hyalimax perlucidus Quoy & Gaimard, 1832 - from Pouce Mountain, Mauritius.
- Hyalimax pellucidus Quoy & Gaimard (Hyalimax pellucidus seems to be misspelled Hyalimax perlucidus.)
- Hyalimax reinhardi Morch, 1872 - from Pulo Panjang and Sambelong, Nicobar Islands.
- Hyalimax viridis Theobald, 1864 - from Arracan.

== Description ==
Tryon (1884) wrote about the genus Hyalimax (while mentioning Hyalimax pellucidus as an example) like this:

"Animal limaciform, swollen at centre, blunt before, and tapering behind; tentacles simple; mantle large, central, concealing all but a small opening; an internal shell-plate; no longitudinal furrows above the margin of the foot, and no caudal mucous pit; no distinct locomotive disk; external respiratory and anal orifices on the central right margin of the mantle; orifice of combined genital system on right side of head, halfway between eye-peduncle and mantle."

"Shell large, rudimentary, thin, oval, unguiform, non-spiral. Jaw smooth with blunt median projection and accessory quadrate plate. Lingual membrane with tricuspid central teeth, multifid laterals, and quadrate marginals."
