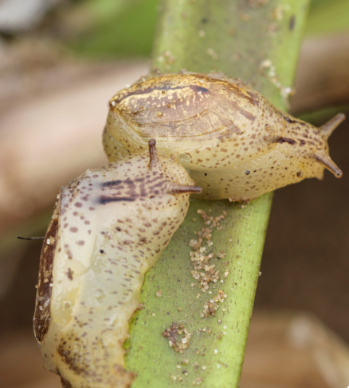

Scientific classification
- Kingdom: Animalia
- Phylum: Mollusca
- Class: Gastropoda
- Order: Stylommatophora
- Family: Succineidae
- Genus: Omalonyx
- Species: O. unguis

Binomial name
- Omalonyx unguis (d’Orbigny, 1837)

= Omalonyx unguis =

Species of gastropod

Omalonyx unguis is a species of air-breathing land snail, a terrestrial pulmonate gastropod mollusc in the family Succineidae, the amber snails.

== Distribution ==
The distribution of Omalonyx unguis includes:

- Argentina
- Brazil
- Paraguay
