= Quickia =

Scientific classification
- Kingdom: Animalia
- Phylum: Mollusca
- Class: Gastropoda
- Order: Stylommatophora
- Family: Succineidae
- Genus: Quickia; Odhner, 1950

Genus of gastropods

Quickia is a genus of gastropods belonging to the family Succineidae.

The species of this genus are found in Africa and India.

Species:

- Quickia aldabraensis Patterson, 1975
- Quickia aldabrensis Patterson, 1975
- Quickia bensoni (L.Pfeiffer, 1850)
- Quickia calcuttensis Patterson, 1970
- Quickia concisa (Morelet, 1848)
- Quickia gravelyi (Rao, 1924)
