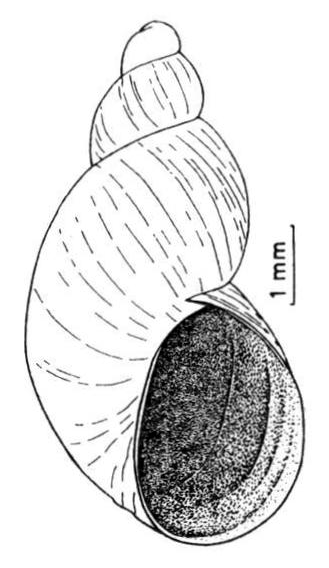
- Drawing of apertural view of a shell of Succinella oblonga

Scientific classification
- Kingdom: Animalia
- Phylum: Mollusca
- Class: Gastropoda
- Order: Stylommatophora
- Infraorder: Succineoidei
- Superfamily: Succineoidea
- Family: Succineidae
- Genus: Succinella; Mabille, 1871

Type species
- Succinea oblonga Draparnaud, 1801

Synonyms
- Hydrophyga Lindholm, 1927; Succinea (Succinella) Mabille, 1871

= Succinella =

Genus of gastropods

Succinella is a genus of small, air-breathing, land snails, terrestrial pulmonate gastropod molluscs in the family Succineidae, commonly called amber snails.

They usually live in damp habitats such as marshes.

== Distribution ==
This genus of snails lives on the continent of Eurasia.

== Species ==
Species within the genus Succinella include:

- † Succinella hartmutnordsiecki (Schlickum & Strauch, 1979)
- † Succinella martinovici (Brusina, 1902)
- Succinella oblonga Draparnaud, 1801 - the type species
