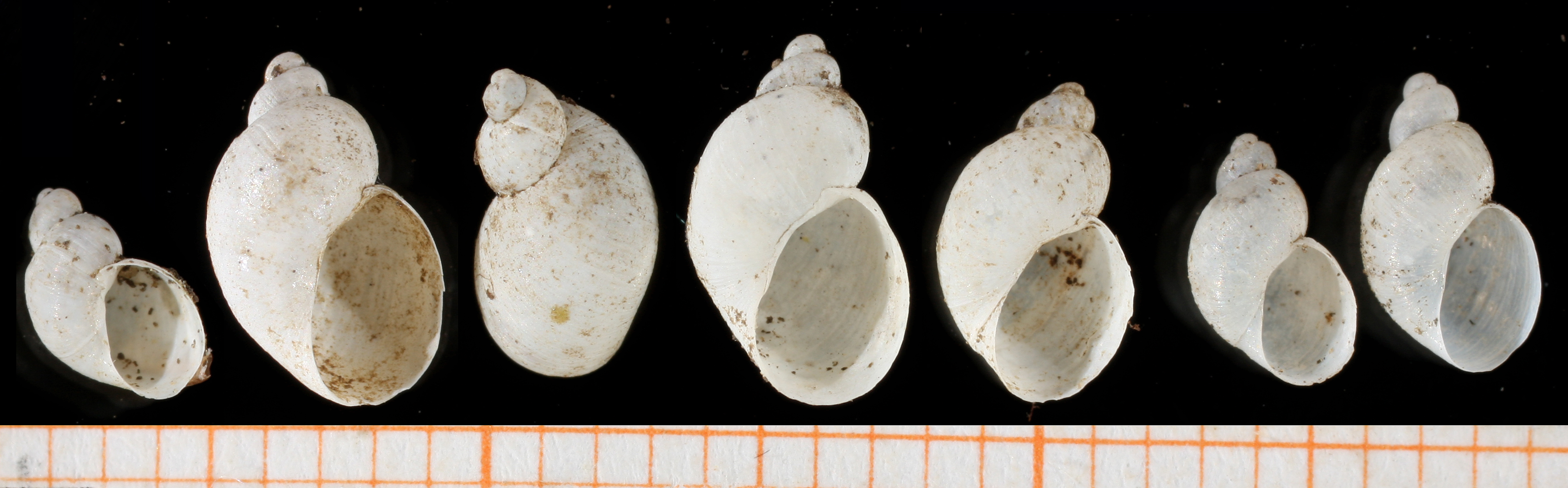
- Shells of Catinella arenaria

Scientific classification
- Kingdom: Animalia
- Phylum: Mollusca
- Class: Gastropoda
- Order: Stylommatophora
- Family: Succineidae
- Genus: Catinella; Pease, 1870

= Catinella (gastropod) =

Genus of gastropods

Catinella is a genus of small air-breathing land snails, terrestrial pulmonate gastropod mollusks in the family Succineidae, the amber snails.

== Species ==
Species within this genus include:

- Catinella arenaria (Bouchard-Chantereaux, 1837) - synonym: Quickella arenaria
- Catinella aprica
- Catinella baldwini
- Catinella exile (Leonard, 1972)
- Catinella explanata (A.Gould, 1852)
- Catinella gelida
- Catinella kuhnsi (Ancey, 1904)
- Catinella montana Pierce, 2021
- Catinella paropsis Cooke, 1921
- Catinella protracta
- Catinella rehderi (Pilsbry, 1948)
- Catinella rotundata (A.Gould, 1846)
- Catinella rubida Pease, 1870
- Catinella stretchiana (Pilsbry, 1948) - Sierra ambersnail
- Catinella thaanumi (Ancey, 1899)
- Catinella tuberculata Cooke, 1921
