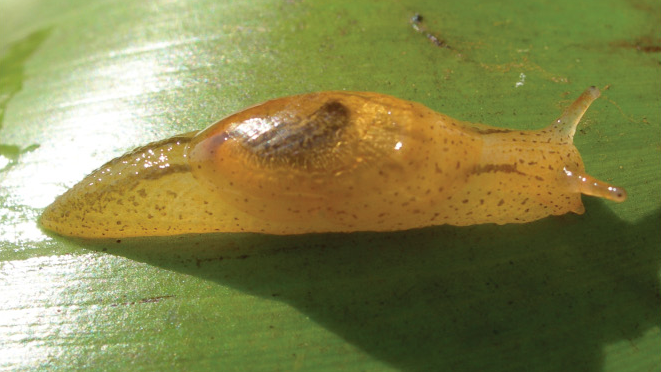
- A live individual of Omalonyx convexus

Scientific classification
- Kingdom: Animalia
- Phylum: Mollusca
- Class: Gastropoda
- Order: Stylommatophora
- Family: Succineidae
- Subfamily: Succineinae
- Genus: Omalonyx d'Orbigny, 1837

= Omalonyx =

Genus of gastropods

Omalonyx is a genus of air-breathing land snails, terrestrial pulmonate gastropod molluscs in the family Succineidae, the amber snails. These snails are amphibious, living very close to water and moving around both on emergent plants and also on submerged aquatic plants.

== Distribution ==
Species of the genus Omalonyx occur in the Caribbean Islands, and they are also amply distributed throughout South America.

== Species ==
Species within the genus Omalonyx include:

- Omalonyx brasiliensis (Simroth, 1896)
- Omalonyx convexus (Heynemann, 1868)
- Omalonyx matheronii (Potiez & Michaud, 1835) or Omalonyx matheroni (Potiez & Michaud, 1838)
- Omalonyx pattersonae Tillier, 1981
- Omalonyx unguis (d'Orbigny, 1837)
- Omalonyx geayi Tillier, 1980

== Description ==
Omalonyx includes slugs with a reduced, flat and fingernail-like shell and a pattern of yellow coloring with two black longitudinal stripes and blackish stains throughout the entire body, including the mantle. The mantle covers the visceral mass and the edge of the shell. Various authors reported various extensions of the mantle: the mantle covers the shell in different extents. The coloring was used to describe and characterize Omalonyx species, but Arruda & Thomé (2011) reported wide variability in color of Omalonyx convexus.

== Ecology ==
The species of Omalonyx are reported on macrophytes or emergent vegetation in the banks of lagoons, river floodplains, and streams. Omalonyx convexus lives in both clean and polluted freshwater environments, as well as on natural and artificial substrates.

These snails are herbivorous, feeding on living plant tissues. Non-vegetal food items were also found in Omalonyx convexus.
