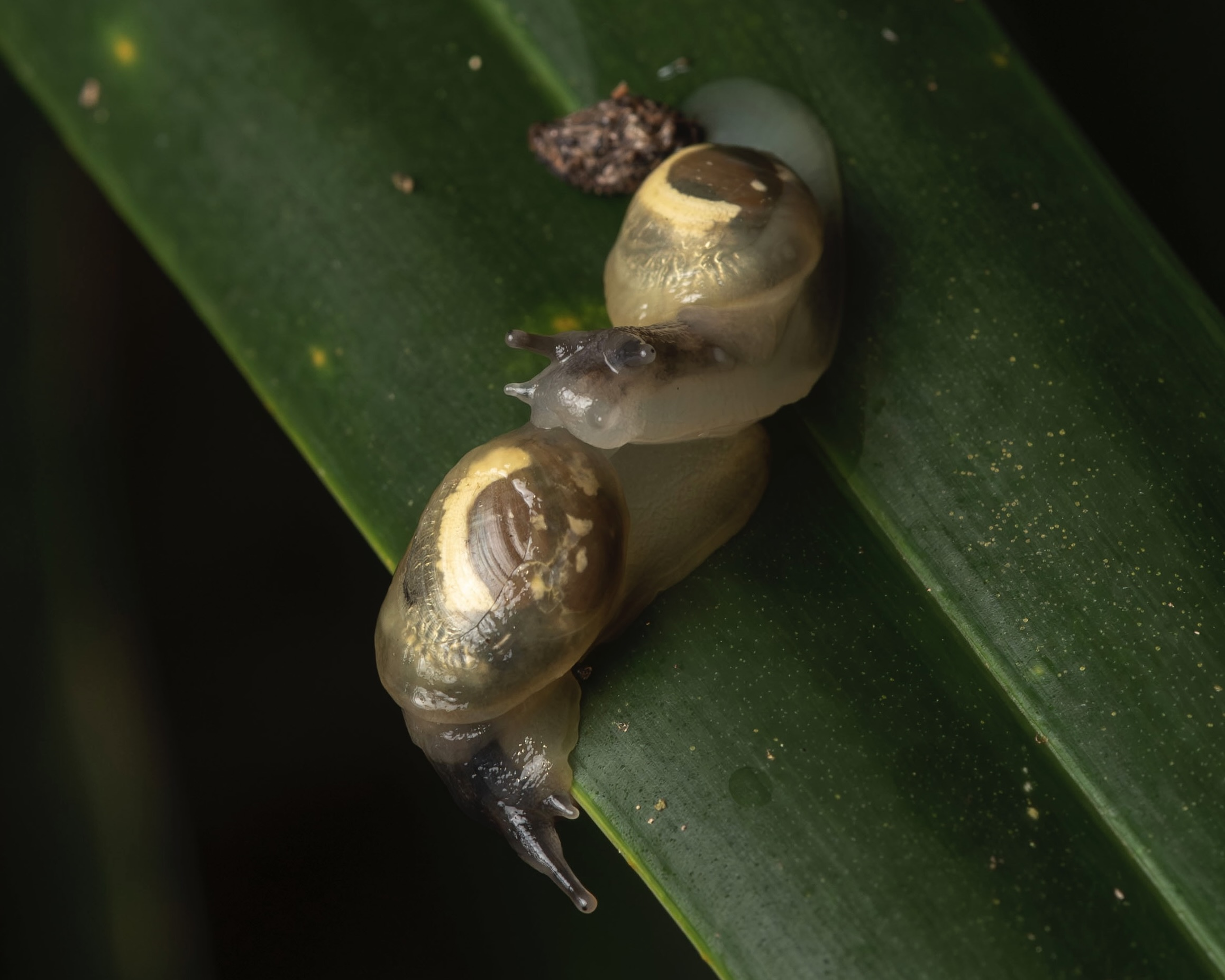

Scientific classification
- Kingdom: Animalia
- Phylum: Mollusca
- Class: Gastropoda
- Order: Stylommatophora
- Family: Succineidae
- Subfamily: Succineinae
- Genus: Boninosuccinea; Habe, 1956

= Boninosuccinea =

Genus of gastropods

Boninosuccinea is a genus of air-breathing land snails, terrestrial gastropod mollusks in the family Succineidae, the amber snails.

== Species ==
Species within the genus Boninosuccinea include:

- Boninosuccinea ogasawarae
- Boninosuccinea punctulispira
