= Vasey's Paradise =

Oasis in Grand Canyon National Park, Arizona

Coordinates: 36°29′45″N 111°51′39″W

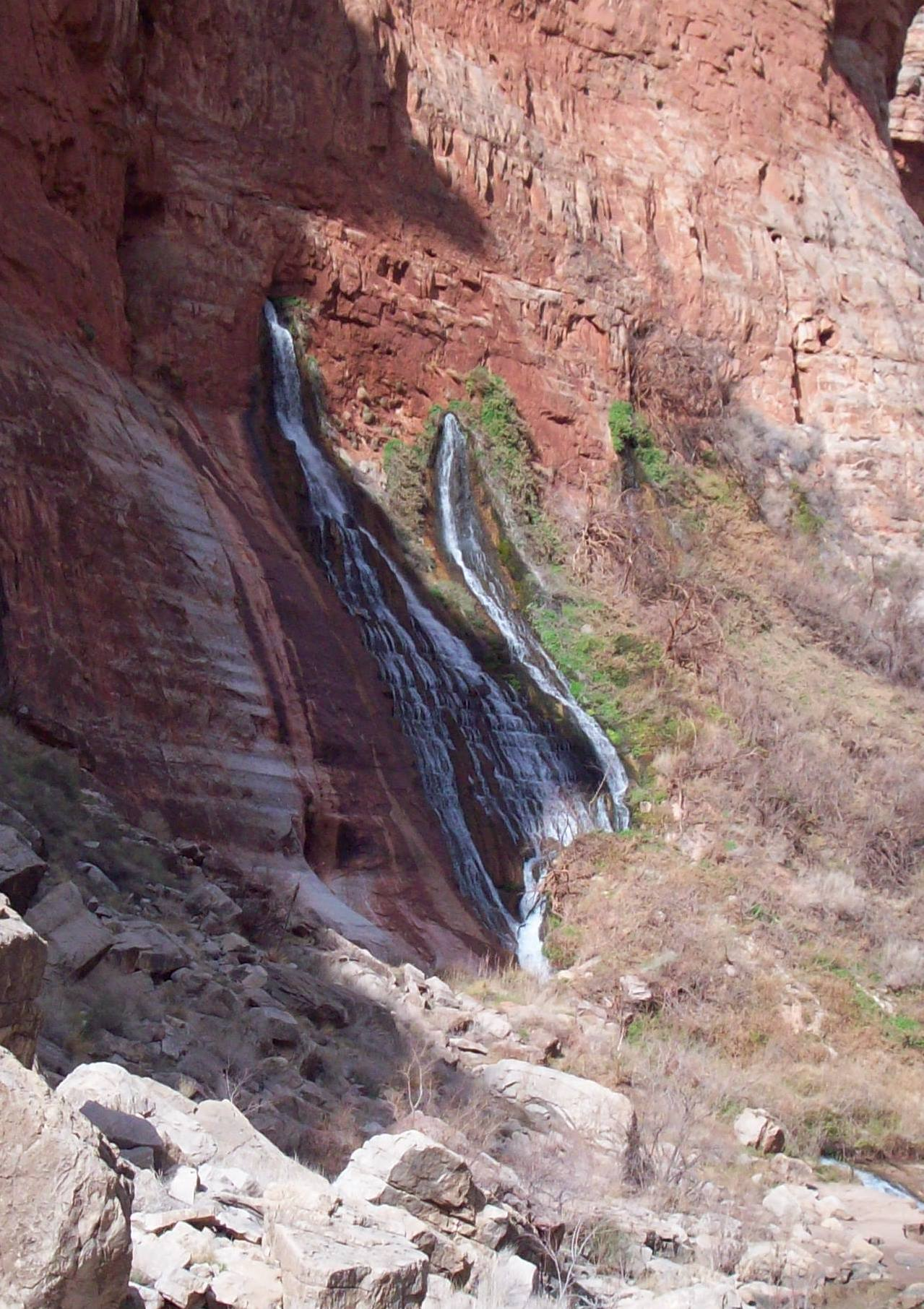
Vasey's Paradise

Vasey's Paradise, also stylized as Vaseys Paradise, is an oasis approximately 1.5 miles (2.4 km) below the Mile 30 Sand Bar on the Colorado River within Grand Canyon National Park, in Coconino County, Arizona, United States.

Near the bottom of the canyon, in an otherwise semi-desert region, it consists of several waterfalls created by groundwater emanating from the upper cliff faces, which supports a localized area of dense vegetation. Vasey's Paradise is a highly sensitive environment which can only be accessed from the river. It is notable for being one of only two known natural habitats of the Kanab ambersnail (Oxyloma haydeni kanabense), a federally listed critically endangered species of land snail.
