= Nicolas Robert Bouchard-Chantereaux =

Nicolas Robert Bouchard-Chantereaux (8 September 1802 – 22 November 1864) was a French geologist and zoologist interested in malacology and marine biology. He was president de l'Administration du Muséum d'Histoire Naturelle Boulogne (collections now in Musée d'Histoire Naturelle de Lille).

Bouchard-Chanteraux wrote Catalogue des mollusques marins observés jusqu'à ce jour à l'état vivant sur les côtes du Boulonnais Boulogne, Impr. de Le Roy-Mabille online published in 1829 and Catalogue des mollusques terrestres et fluviatiles observés jusqu'à ce jour à l'état vivant dans le département du Pas-de-Calais Boulogne, Impr. de Le Roy-Mabille published in 1838 online here and Catalogue des Crustacés observés jusqu'a ce jour a l'état vivant dans le Boulonnais 1833

Bouchard-Chanteraux collected fossils alongside Pierre-Nicolas Dutertre Delporte, Administrateur du Muséum, à Boulogne. Among the magnificent collections of Mr. Bouchard should be especially admired his Brachiopods: immense series of certain species collected with paternal care of immense series which capture all the nuances possible, differences in age, size, relationships with such or such other closely related species. Mr. Bouchard drawers are more precious than any book teaching! I couldn't tire of admire these beautiful series. Among the most remarkable and the most useful for geologists coming to visit the Boulonnais Eugène Eudes-Deslongchamps.His collections included Jurassic fish studied by Louis Agassiz.

Depuis longtemps déjà Dutertre-Delporte recueillait des débris de poissons fossiles; de son côté Bouchard-Chantereaux en accumulait dans ses riches collections paléontologiques. Les auteurs classiques avaient connaissance des espèces que possédaient les deux naturalistes. Egerton adonné, dans la famille des Chimères, le nom de Dutertre à un individu du genre Ischyodus. Gervais, dans sa Zoologie et Géologie Françaises cite Bouchard à propos d'un Ibodus.

Bouchard-Chanteraux described the snail Catinella arenaria

The brachiopod Soaresirhynchia bouchardi Davidson 1852 honours his name as do the fossil sharks Lamna bouchardi Sauvage, 1867 (Cretolamna bouchardi) and Ischyodus bouchardi Sauvage, 1867. Other name bearers are the fossil echinoid Hemipedina bouchardi Wright and the fossil bivalve Isognomon bouchardi Oppel

== See also ==
Henri Émile Sauvage
