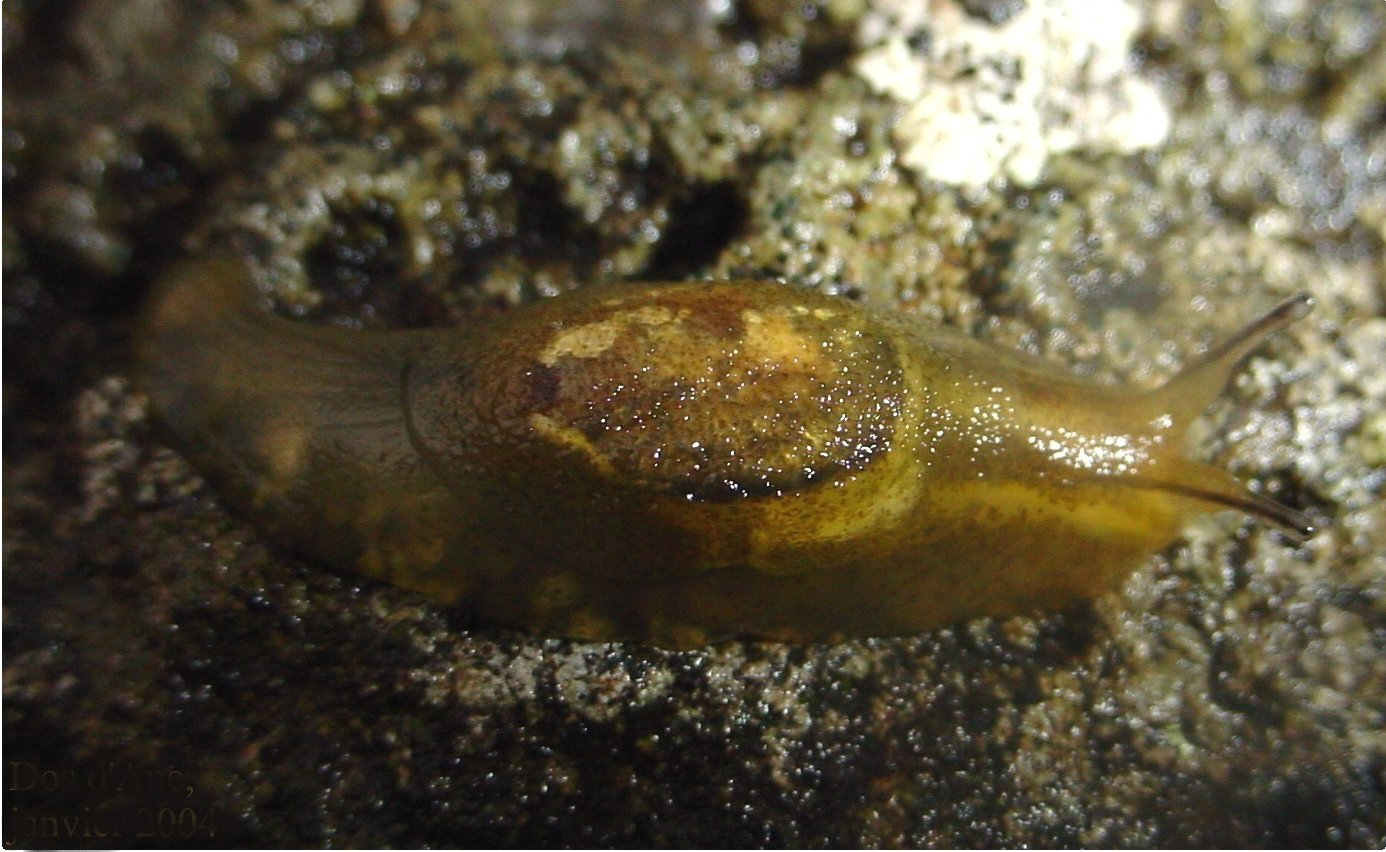

Scientific classification
- Domain: Eukaryota
- Kingdom: Animalia
- Phylum: Mollusca
- Class: Gastropoda
- Order: Stylommatophora
- Family: Succineidae
- Genus: Hyalimax
- Species: H. maillardi

Binomial name
- Hyalimax maillardi Fischer, 1867

= Hyalimax maillardi =

Species of gastropod

Hyalimax maillardi is a species of air-breathing succineid land slug, a terrestrial pulmonate gastropod mollusk in the family Succineidae, the amber snails.

== Distribution ==
This species is endemic to Réunion. Its habitat is rain-forest.
