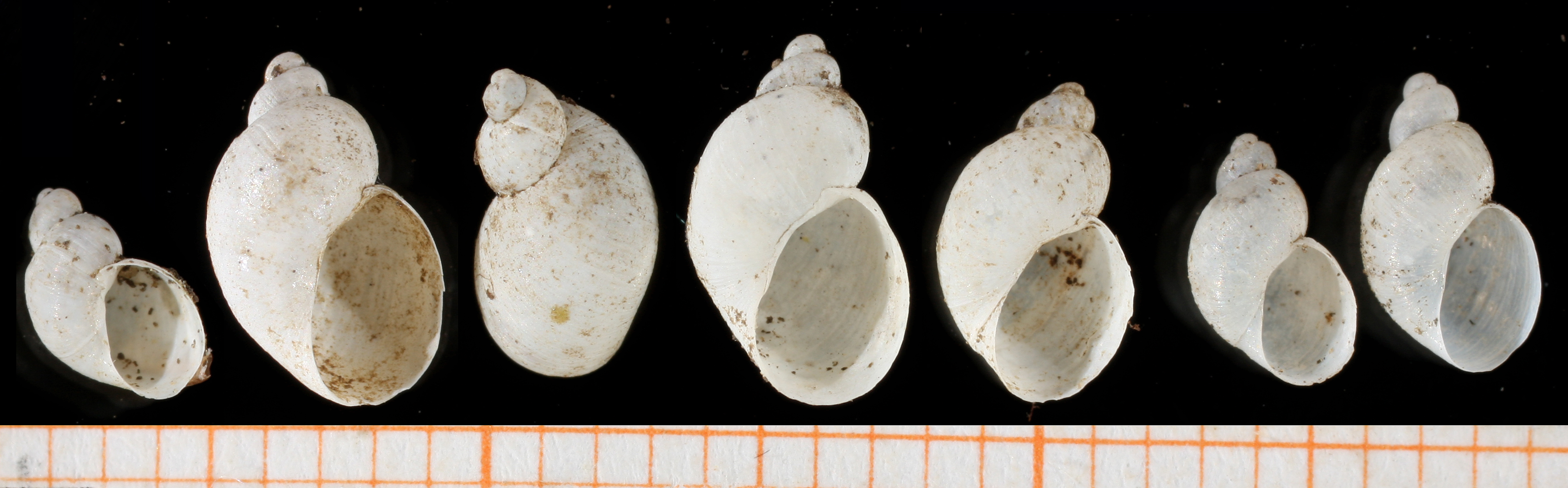
- Shells of Catinella arenaria

Conservation status
- Near Threatened (IUCN 2.3)

Scientific classification
- Kingdom: Animalia
- Phylum: Mollusca
- Class: Gastropoda
- Order: Stylommatophora
- Family: Succineidae
- Genus: Quickella; Boettger, 1939
- Species: Q. arenaria

Binomial name
- Quickella arenaria (Potiez et Michaud, 1835)

Synonyms
- Catinella arenaria Bouchard-Chanteraux, 1837; Catinella (Quickella) arenaria (Bouchard-Chantereaux, 1837); Succinea arenaria Potiez & Michaud, 1838 (original combination)

= Quickella =

Genus of gastropods

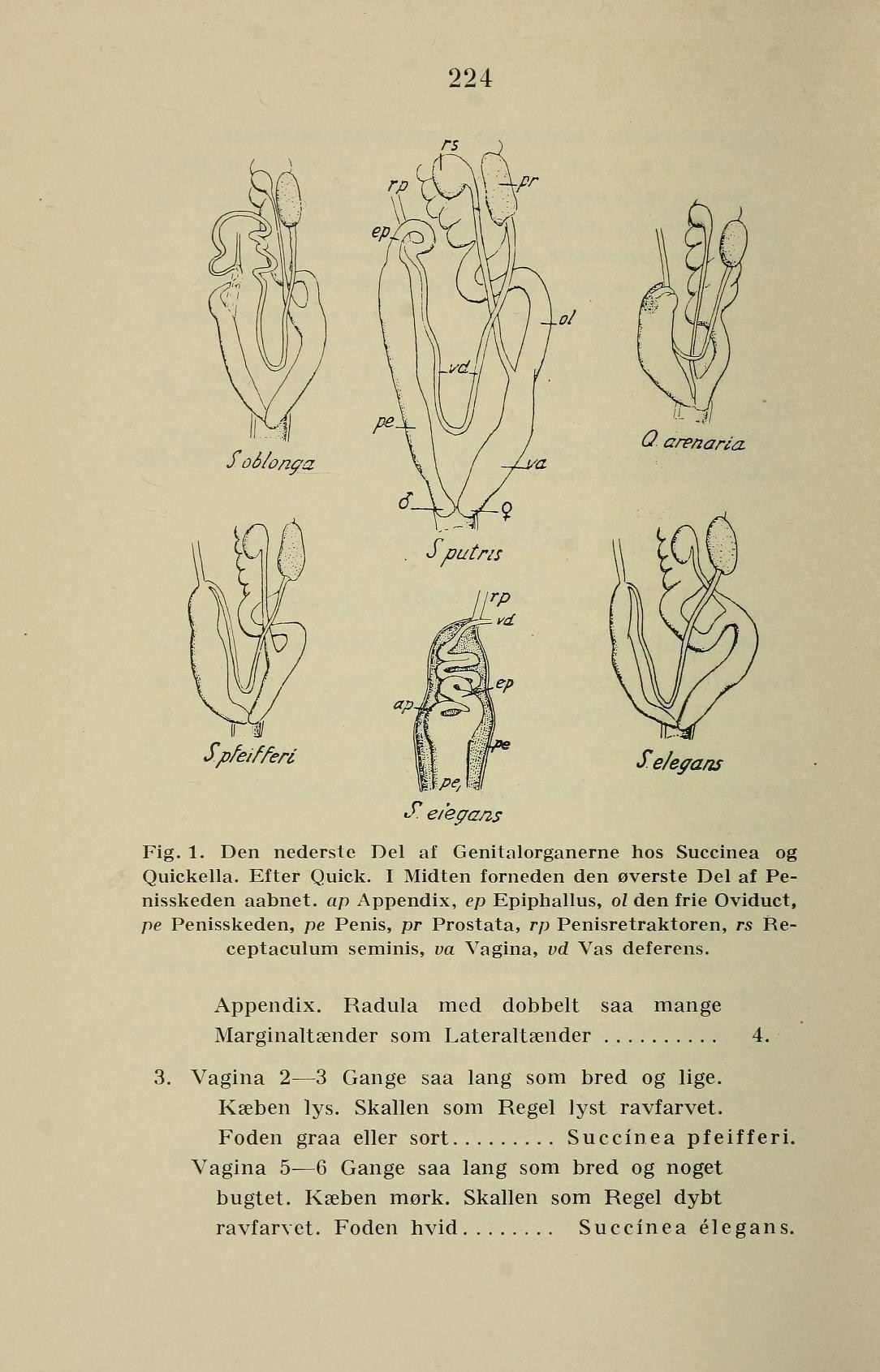
Catinella arenaria genitalia in Danmarks Fauna

Quickella is a monotypic genus of land snail in the family Succineidae, the amber snails. It is known commonly as the sandbowl snail. The only species is Quickella arenaria.

Synonyms

- Quickella (Mediappendix) Pilsbry, 1948: synonym of Mediappendix Pilsbry, 1948
- Quickella rehderi Pilsbry, 1948: synonym of Mediappendix rehderi (Pilsbry, 1948) (original combination)

== Description ==
The shell is 5 to 8 millimeters widea and red-brown in colour. It is fragile, short, turreted, and conical with large body whorl, three whorls and an almost circular aperture. The aperture is about 50% of the shell height, the spire is very short and the whorls are convex with deep sutures. Surface moderately shiny with relatively coarse growth lines. In life the dark digestive gland shows through the spire making it seem very dark compared to the body whorl. The animal is dark grey to black. The shell is very similar to Succinella oblonga. Identification requires dissection. The genitalia differ in these respects: "Penis short with a black spot at vas deferens and retractor insertion, vas deferens inserts directly into penis, epiphallus absent, penis without envelope (S. oblonga has a long penis with epiphallus and a long vas deferens)."

== Habitat ==
This snail lives in wet hollows among sand dunes. In the British Isles these areas are known as "dune slacks", and when in pristine condition, these hollows provide a specialized habitat for an unusual group of fauna and flora, which includes this species.Also on shallow flooded sandy or muddy and calcareous soils. In Switzerland, it occurs up to an altitude of 2200 meters above sea level.

== Distribution ==
The range is suboceanic boreo-temperate (Ccnfined to western Europe and distributed mainly near coasts from France to south-east Sweden). There are outliers inland in mountain areas of central Scandinavia and east Switzerland.

This species occurs in areas including:

- The British Isles: Great Britain, Ireland. It is listed in List of endangered species in the British Isles. It is endangered in Great Britain. This species is fully protected in the United Kingdom under the Wildlife and Countryside Act 1981 since 1981.
- Western Europe: France, Belgium, Netherlands, Switzerland
- Central Europe: Germany, Poland, Slovakia
- Northern Europe: Norway, Sweden.

Catinella (Quickella) arenaria is scattered and rare due to its relict distribution, initially it was widespread at the end of the glacial period, and decreased after forest growth.
