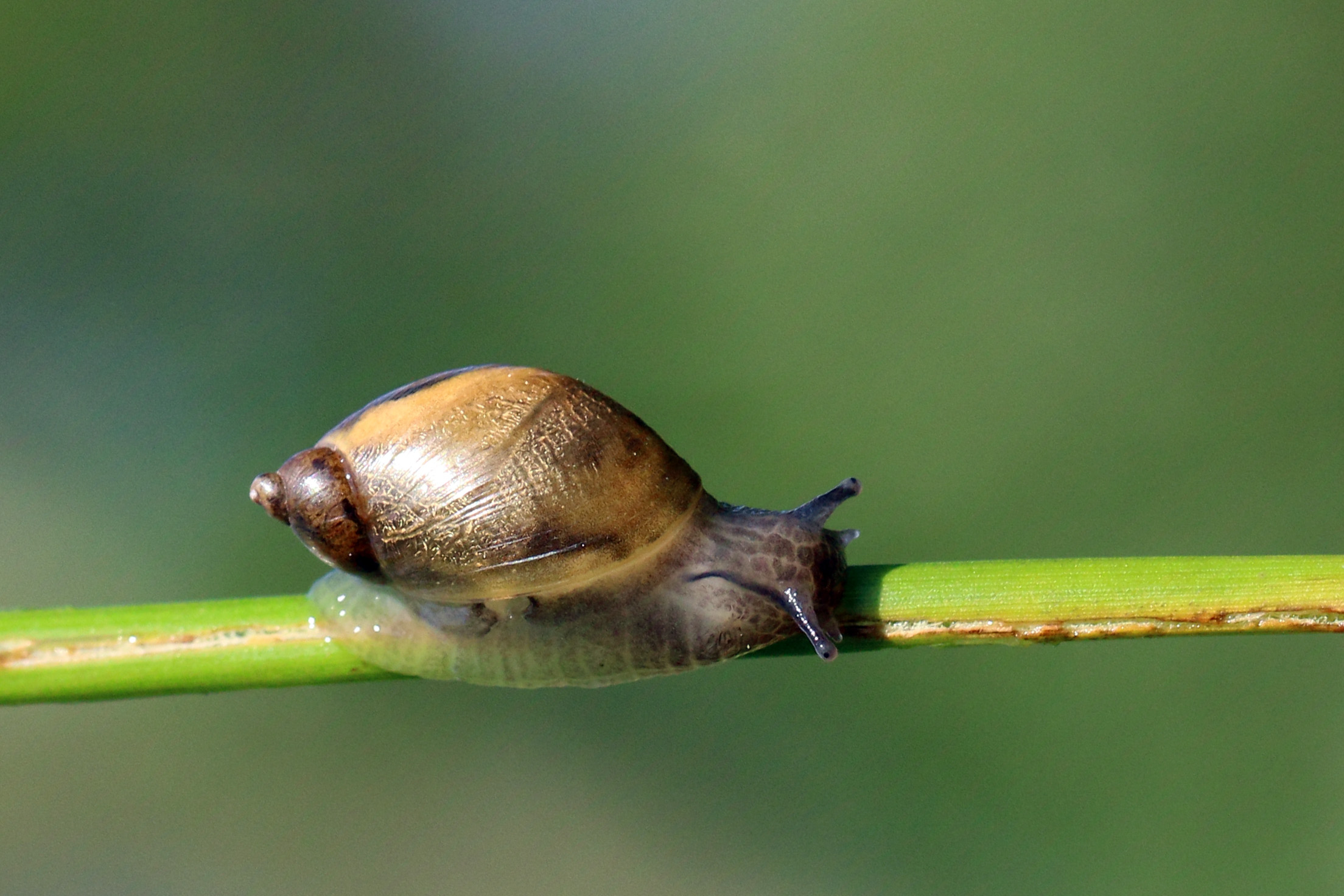
- Succinea putris in Oxfordshire

Scientific classification
- Kingdom: Animalia
- Phylum: Mollusca
- Class: Gastropoda
- Order: Stylommatophora
- Suborder: Helicina
- Infraorder: Succineoidei
- Superfamily: Succineoidea; Beck, 1837
- Family: Succineidae; Beck, 1837

Genera
- See text

= Succineidae =

Family of gastropods

Succineidae are a family of small to medium-sized, air-breathing land snails (and slugs), terrestrial pulmonate gastropod molluscs in the superfamily Succineoidea.

They are commonly called amber snails because their thin fragile shells are translucent and amber-colored. They usually live in damp habitats such as marshes.

Succineidae is the only family in the superfamily Succineoidea.

The soft parts of the animal appear to be too large for the shell.

== Karyotype ==
In this family, the number of haploid chromosomes varies greatly. The most common totals are less than 10, and also lies between 21 and 25, but other values are also possible (according to the values in this table).

== Taxonomy ==
The family Succineidae contains two subfamilies (according to the taxonomy of the Gastropoda by Bouchet & Rocroi, 2005):

- Succineinae Beck, 1837 - synonyms: Hyalimacinae Godwin-Austen, 1882; Oxylomatinae Schileyko & I. M. Likharev, 1986
- Catinellinae Odhner, 1950

== Genera ==
Genera in the family Succineidae include:

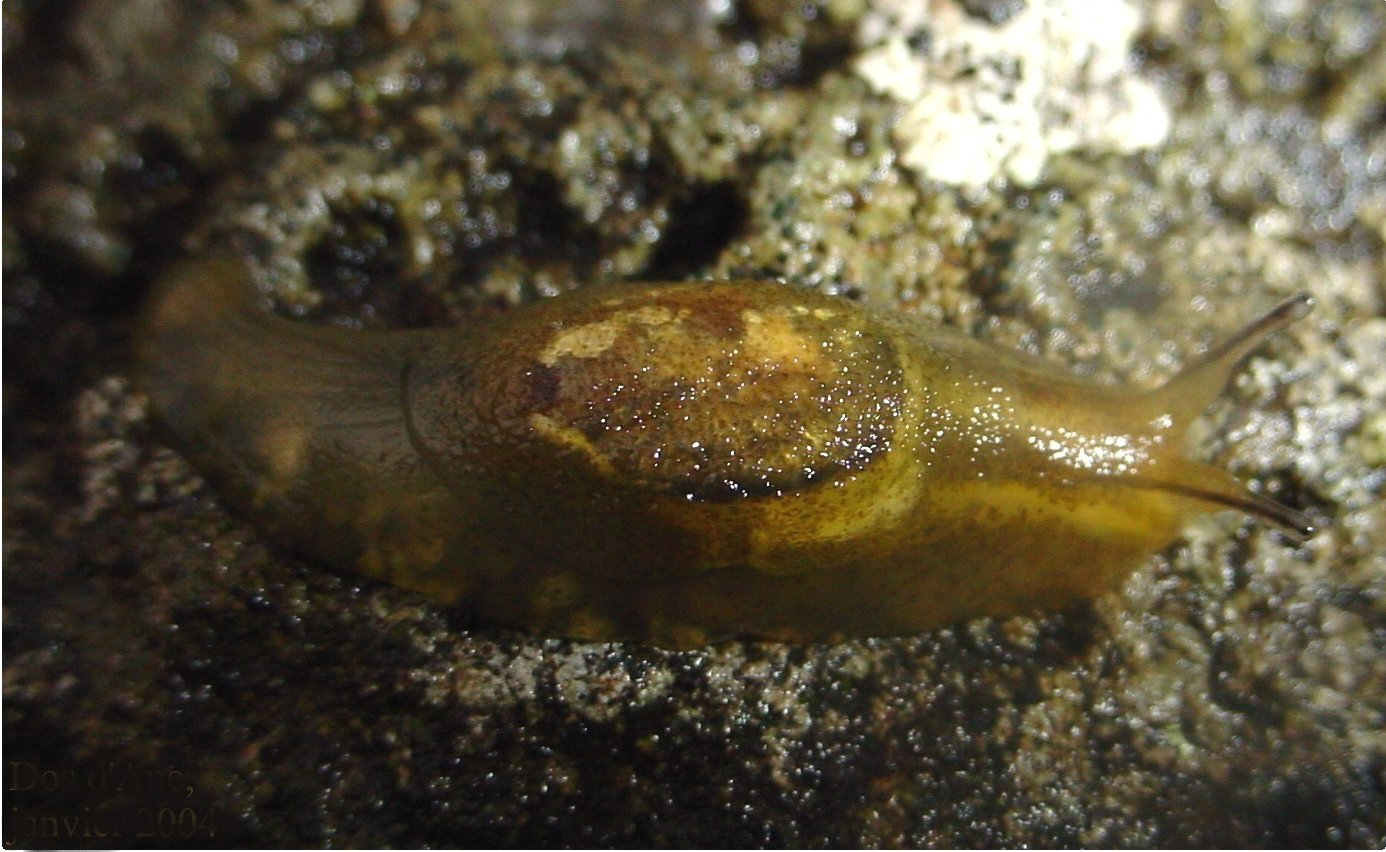
The succineid slug Hyalimax maillardi from the island of Réunion

- † Eoquickia Harzhauser & Neubauer in Harzhauser et al., 2016
- † Papyrotheca Brusina, 1893
- † Suratia Hamilton-Bruce & Kear, 2010

Catinellinae Odhner, 1950

- Catinella Pease, 1870
- Indosuccinea Rao, 1924
- Mediappendix Pilsbry, 1948
- Quickella C. Boettgger, 1939
- Quickia Odhner, 1950

Oxylomatinae Schileyko & Likharev, 1986

- Oxyloma Westerlund, 1885

Succineinae Beck, 1837

- Austrosuccinea Iredale, 1937
- Boninosuccinea Habe, 1956
- Camptonyx Benson, 1858
- Helisiga Lesson, 1831
- Hyalimax H. Adams & A. Adams, 1855
- † Laxisuccinea Cooke, 1921
- Lithotis W. T. Blanford, 1863
- Neosuccinea Matekin, 1956
- Novisuccinea Pilsbry, 1948
- Omalonyx d'Orbigny, 1837
- Pamirsuccinea Schileyko & Likharev, 1986
- Spirancinea Iredale, 1945
- Succinea Draparnaud, 1801
- Succinella Mabille, 1871

Nomen nudum

- Papusuccinea Iredale, 1941

Synonyms

- Subfamily Hyalimacinae Godwin-Austen, 1882: synonym of Succineinae H. Beck, 1837
- Subfamily Oxylomatinae Schileyko & I. M. Likharev, 1986: synonym of Succineinae H. Beck, 1837
- Amphibina W. Hartmann, 1821: synonym of Succinea Draparnaud, 1801
- Amphibulima Gistel, 1848: synonym of Succinea Draparnaud, 1801 (Invalid: unnecessary substitute name for Succinea; also a junior homonym of Amphibulima Lamarck, 1805)
- Arborcinea Iredale, 1937: synonym of Succinea Draparnaud, 1801
- Brachyspira L. Pfeiffer, 1855 †: synonym of Succinea (Brachyspira) L. Pfeiffer, 1855 represented as Succinea Draparnaud, 1801
- Cerinasota Iredale, 1939: synonym of Succinea Draparnaud, 1801
- Cochlohydra A. Férussac, 1821: synonym of Succinea Draparnaud, 1801
- Homalonyx Ancey, 1881: synonym of Omalonyx d'Orbigny, 1838 (unjustified emendation)
- Hydrophyga Lindholm, 1927: synonym of Succinella Mabille, 1871
- Hydrotropa Lindholm, 1927: synonym of Oxyloma Westerlund, 18854* Lucena Hartmann, 1821: synonym of Succinea Draparnaud, 1801
- Neohyalimax Simroth, 1896: synonym of Omalonyx d'Orbigny, 1838
- Succinastrum J. Mabille, 1871: synonym of Succinea Draparnaud, 1801
- Succinoides Schileyko, 1967: synonym of Oxyloma (Succinoides) Schileyko, 1967 represented as Oxyloma Westerlund, 1885
- Tapada S. Studer, 1820: synonym of Succinea Draparnaud, 1801
- Truella Pease, 1871: synonym of Succinea Draparnaud, 1801
