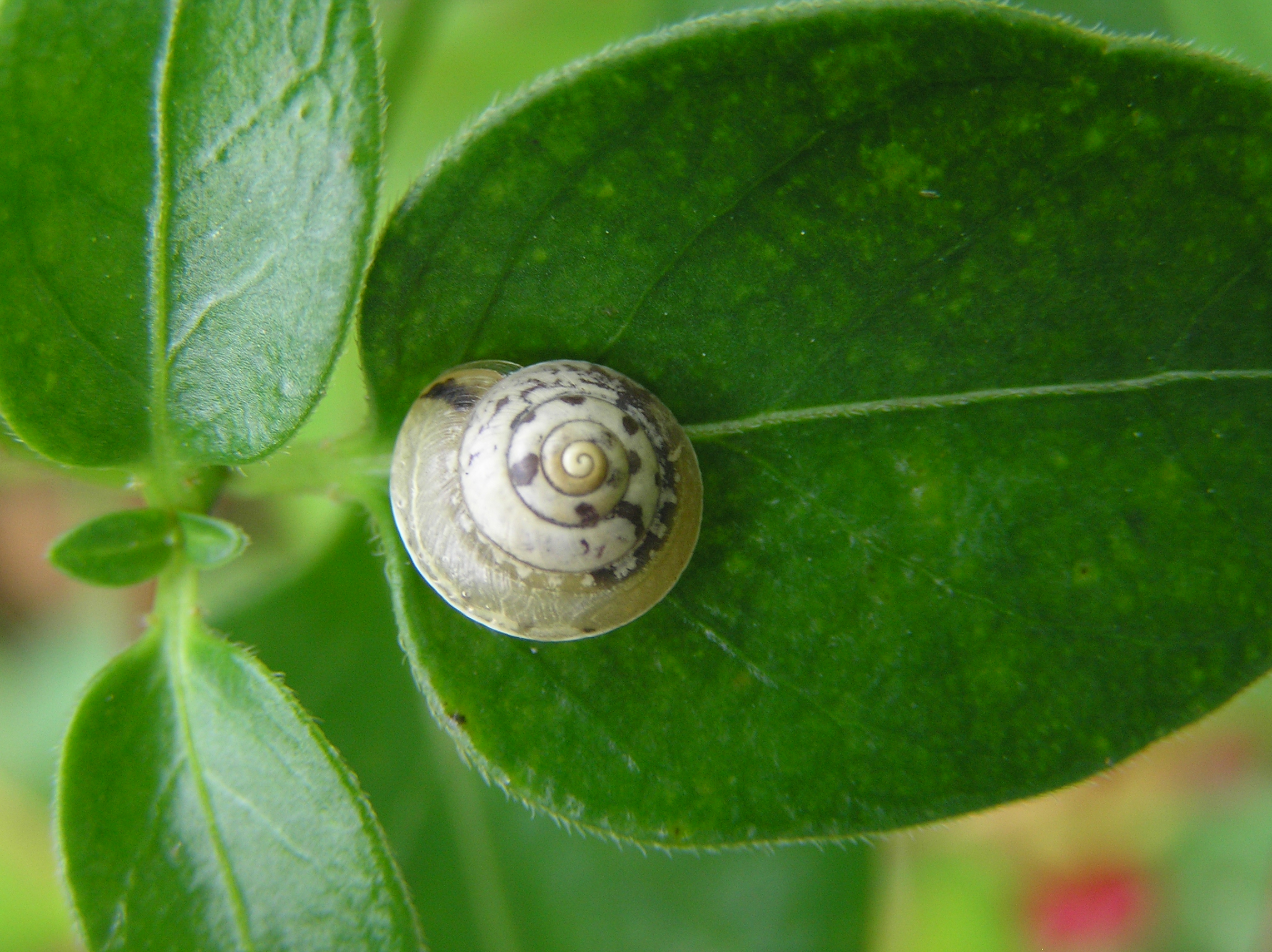
- A live individual of Hygromia cinctella, withdrawn into its shell

Conservation status
- Least Concern (IUCN 3.1)

Scientific classification
- Kingdom: Animalia
- Phylum: Mollusca
- Class: Gastropoda
- Order: Stylommatophora
- Family: Hygromiidae
- Genus: Hygromia
- Species: H. cinctella

Binomial name
- Hygromia cinctella (Draparnaud, 1801)

Synonyms
- List: Helix cinctella Draparnaud, 1801; Helix interrupta Bonelli, 1872; Helix ecarinata Paulucci, 1878; Helix chelydea Westerlund, 1889

= Hygromia cinctella =

Species of gastropod

Hygromia cinctella, known commonly as the girdled snail, is a small European species of air-breathing land snail, belonging to the terrestrial pulmonate gastropod mollusk subfamily Hygromiinae of the family Hygromiidae. It is native to the Mediterranean region and was described by the French malacolgist Jacques Draparnaud in 1801. It is now found in central and northern Europe.

== Description ==
For terms see gastropod shell Hygromia cinctella possesses a 6–7 × 10–12 mm dextral shell composed of 5–6 whorls with shallow sutures that form a high conical top and a flattened underside. The last whorl is sharply keeled. The keel has a characteristic white edge, which 'girdles' the shell, giving the snail its common name. The aperture is simple without a lip inside. The umbilicus is very narrow and almost covered by the reflected columellar margin. The shell colour is variable, from whitish grey to horny brown, often with dark spots, slightly translucent, finely and rather regularly striated. The animal is light greyish or with a yellowish hue, often with darker greyish or brownish head and tentacles.

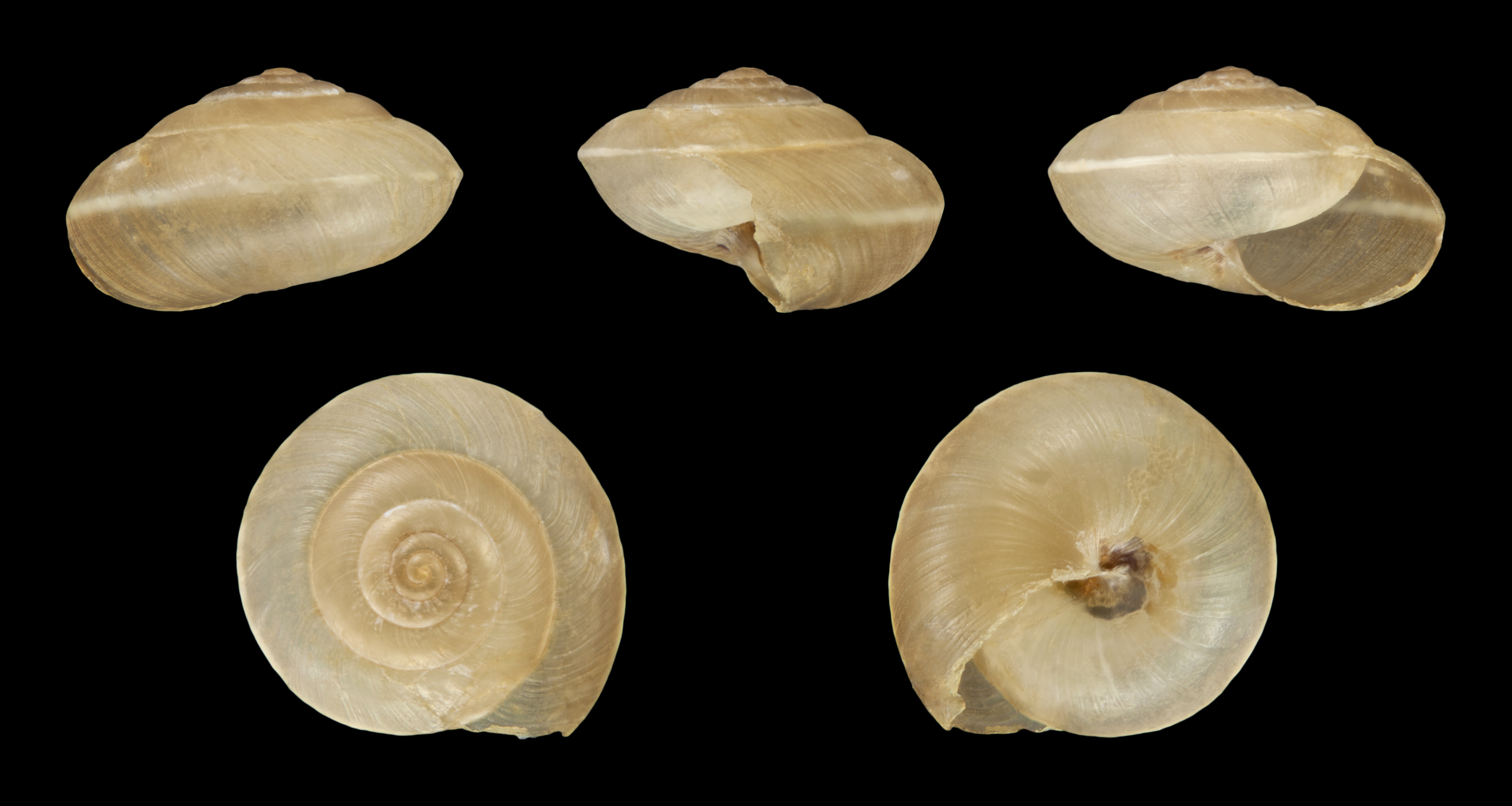
Shell

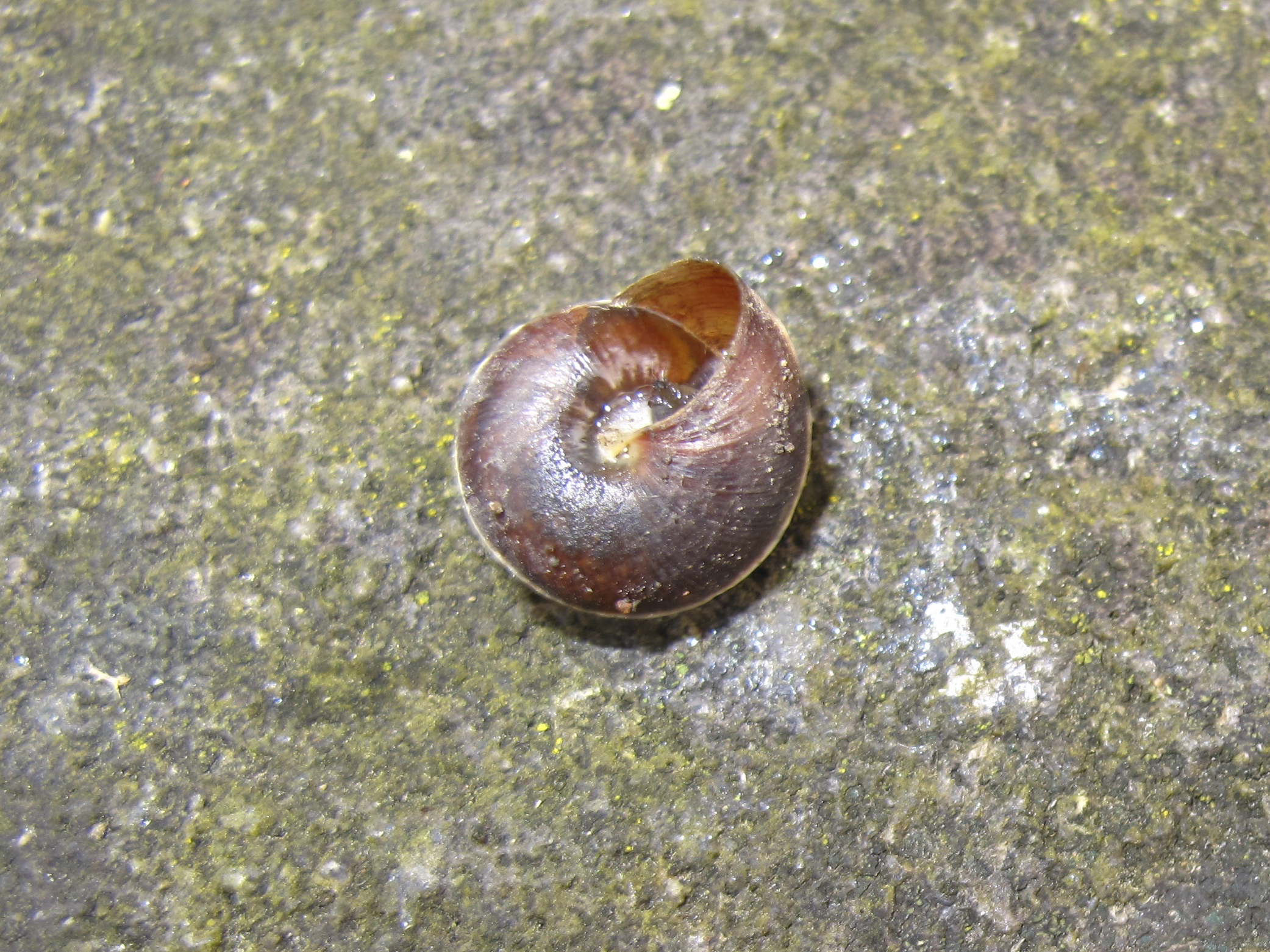
Underside of Girdled snail showing the sealed umbilicum

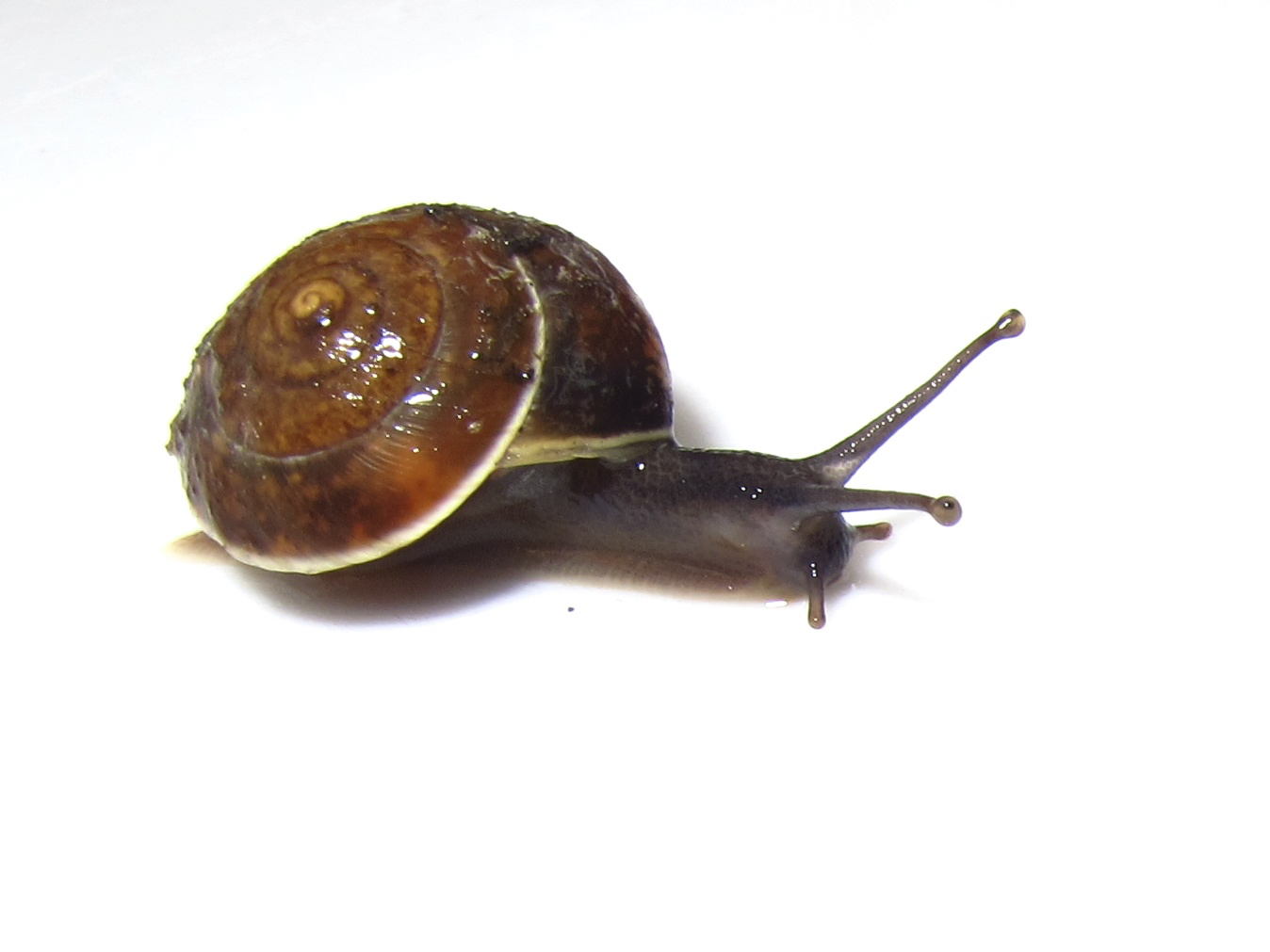
Active Girdled snail

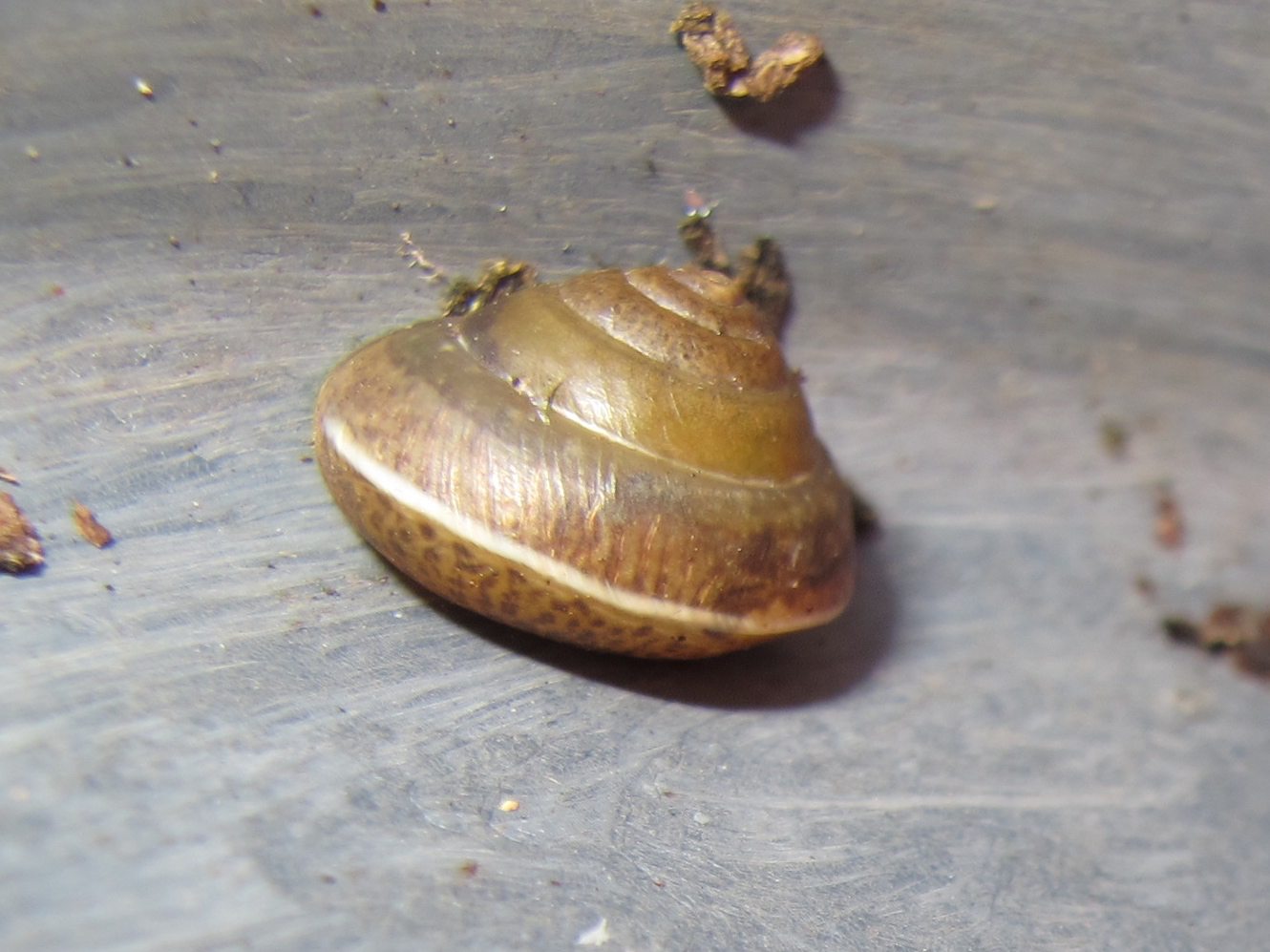
Girdled snail showing white edge of the shell, keel and pyramidal shape.

Variation: In Sicily, colour morphs include green and yellow and reddish, also with colour bands.

== Distribution ==
This snail is native to various European countries around the Mediterranean, including south-east France, southern Switzerland, north-west Croatia, Italy, and Slovenia. It has been introduced and is becoming rapidly established in Great Britain, Austria, Czech Republic, Hungary, Belgium, Germany, the Netherlands and the United States. It has also been recorded in Ireland.

Hygromia cinctella was described as new to Britain by writer Alex Comfort based on specimens he had found in the Paignton area of Devon in April 1950. Subsequently, it was realised that specimens of this species had actually been found in the area from 1945 onwards, but these had been misidentified as the related species and close congener Hygromia limbata, itself a non-native species only discovered in Britain in 1919. It remained predominantly confined to the south-east of England until the mid-1970s, at which point it began to extend its range dramatically. It now has a scattered distribution which extends as far north as Scotland, the first Scottish record being in Glasgow in 2008. In Britain it seems to favour anthropogenic habitats such as gardens, hedgerows and waste ground.

Hygromia cinctella has so far been discovered at two sites in Ireland; waste ground west of Cork City and a garden near Lisburn where it appears to be persisting. The latter population is thought to have been accidentally introduced along with garden plants brought from a site near Bristol.

== Behaviour ==
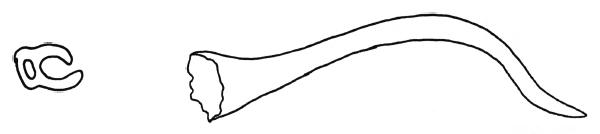
Love dart of H. cinctella

Where they occur, numerous Hygromia cinctella can often be found together in large aggregations. They can be active at night in humid conditions, on paths and flagstones. They can rest high on walls or in the leaf litter and underside of logs. The species can be active in cold weather and survives very cold winters in Central Europe, therefore its recent expansion might have more to do with increased transportation than with climate change.

This species creates and uses love darts in its mating behavior. They are detritivores, but do occasionally consume living plants.
