= Zenobiellina graminicola =

Scientific classification
- Domain: Eukaryota
- Kingdom: Animalia
- Phylum: Mollusca
- Class: Gastropoda
- Order: Stylommatophora
- Superfamily: Helicoidea
- Family: Hygromiidae
- Genus: Zenobiellina
- Species: Z. graminicola

Binomial name
- Zenobiellina graminicola D. T. Holyoak & G. A. Holyoak, 2018

Species of gastropod

Zenobiellina graminicola is a species of small air-breathing land snail, a pulmonate gastropod mollusk in the subfamily Hygromiinae of the family Hygromiidae.

== Distribution ==
This species occurs in Cantabria, Spain.
