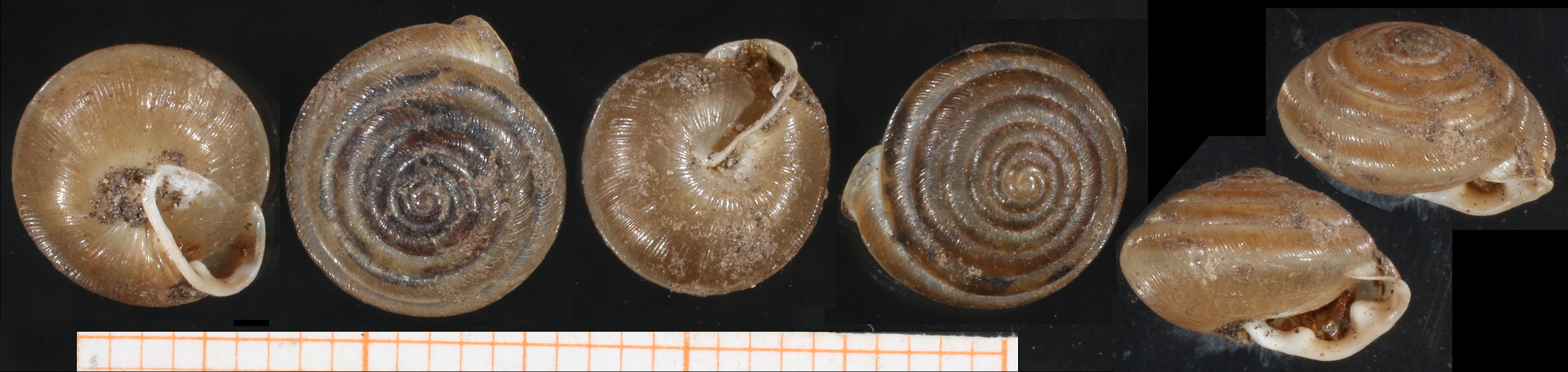
- Perforatella bidentata shells

Scientific classification
- Domain: Eukaryota
- Kingdom: Animalia
- Phylum: Mollusca
- Class: Gastropoda
- Order: Stylommatophora
- Family: Hygromiidae
- Subfamily: Hygromiinae
- Genus: Perforatella; Schlüter, 1838

Species
- See text

Synonyms
- Dibothrion L. Pfeiffer, 1855; Helix (Petasia) Beck, 1837 (Invalid: junior homonym of Petasia Stephens, 1829 [Lepidoptera]); Perforatella (Perforatella) Schlüter, 1838; Petasia H. Beck, 1837 (Invalid: junior homonym of Petasia Stephens, 1829 [Lepidoptera]); Trochiscus Held, 1838

= Perforatella =

Genus of gastropods

Perforatella is a genus of air-breathing land snails, terrestrial pulmonate gastropod molluscs in the subfamily Hygromiinae of the family Hygromiidae, the hairy snails and their allies.

This genus of snails is native to northeastern Europe to the Caucasus and Siberia.

Species in this genus of snails create and use love darts in their mating behavior.

== Species ==
Species within the genus Perforatella:

- Perforatella bidentata (Gmelin, 1791)
- Perforatella dibothrion (Bielz, 1860)
- † Perforatella schileykoi Prisyazhnyuk, 1974

Synonyms

- Perforatella incarnata (O. F. Müller, 1774): synonym of Monachoides incarnatus (O. F. Müller, 1774) (superseded generic combination)
- Perforatella rubiginosa (A. Schmidt, 1853): synonym of Pseudotrichia rubiginosa (Rossmässler, 1838)
