= Ciliella =

Ciliella is the scientific name of two genera of organisms and may refer to:

- Ciliella (fungus), a genus of fungi in the order Helotiales
- Ciliella (gastropod), a genus of mollusc in the family Hygromiidae
