= Hildred =

Hildred is a surname and given name. Notable people with the name include:

Given name:

- Hildred Blewett (1911–2004), Canadian accelerator physicist
- Hildred Mary Butler (1906–1975), Australian microbiologist
- Hildred Carlile, CBE (1852–1942), English businessman and Conservative Party politician
- Hildred Geertz (1927–2022), American anthropologist, studied Balinese and Javanese kinship practices
- Hildred Goodwine (1918–1998), artist, sculptor and illustrator

Surname:

- Florence Taylor Hildred (1865–1932), pastor, and the first female member of Leeds Astronomical Society
- Wayne Hildred (born 1955), New Zealand former racing cyclist
- William Hildred, CB, OBE (1893–1986), British civil servant, Director-General of the International Air Traffic Association

== See also ==
- Hilde (disambiguation)
- Hiltrud
- Hiltrudia
