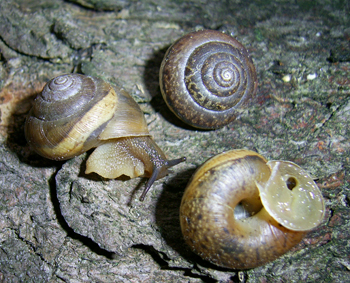
- Euomphalia strigella

Scientific classification
- Kingdom: Animalia
- Phylum: Mollusca
- Class: Gastropoda
- Order: Stylommatophora
- Family: Hygromiidae
- Genus: Euomphalia
- Species: E. strigella

Binomial name
- Euomphalia strigella (Draparnaud, 1801)

Synonyms
- Euomphalia (Euomphalia) strigella (Draparnaud, 1801)

= Euomphalia strigella =

Species of gastropod

Euomphalia strigella is a species of air-breathing land snail, a terrestrial pulmonate gastropod mollusk in the family Hygromiidae, the hairy snails and their allies.

== Subspecies ==
- Euomphalia strigella mehadiae (Bourguignat, 1881)
- Euomphalia strigella ruscinica (Bourguignat, 1881)
- Euomphalia strigella strigella (Draparnaud, 1801)

== Distribution ==
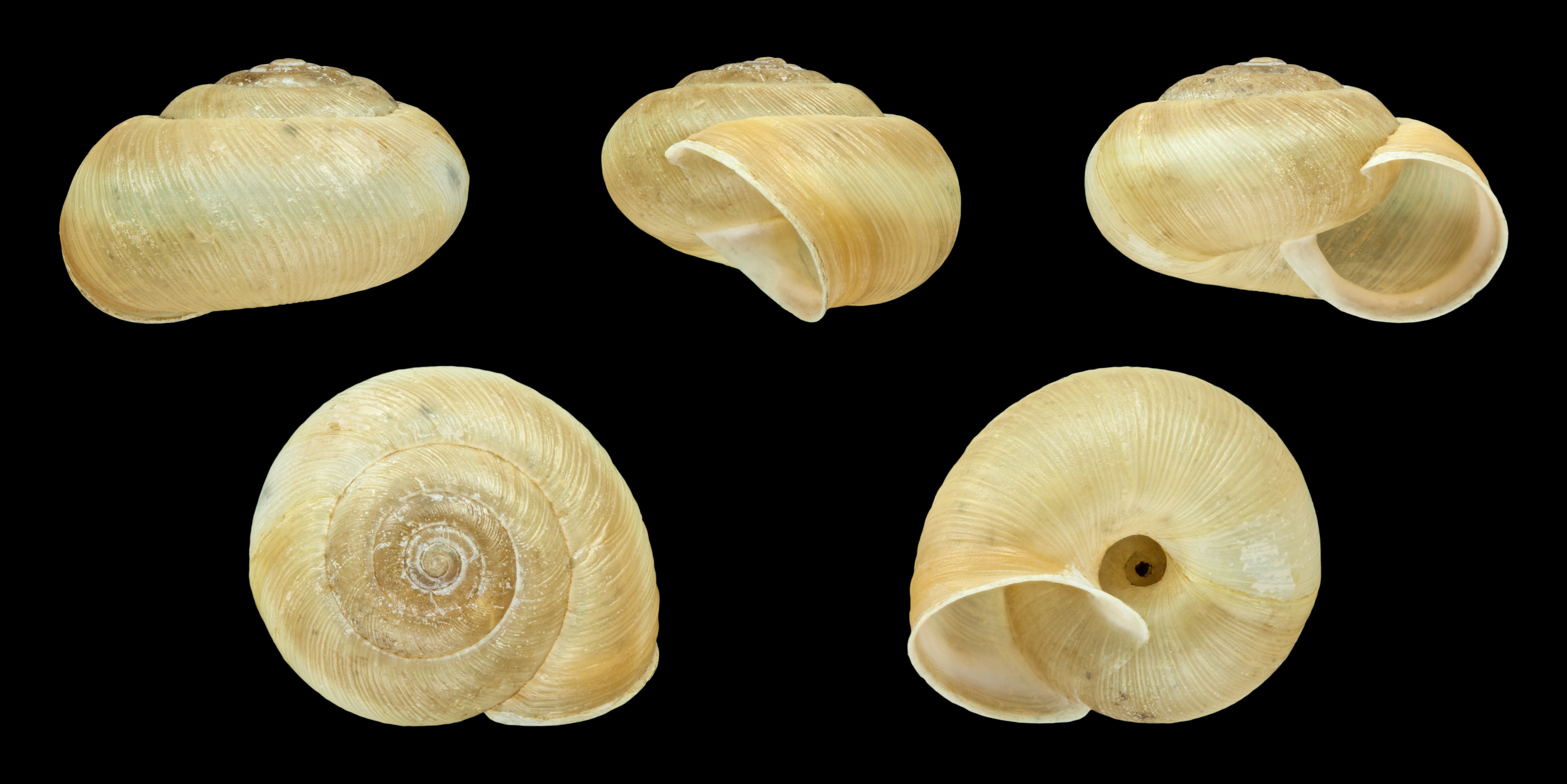

This species is known to occur in:

- Ukraine
