= Monachoides kosovoensis =

Conservation status
- Near Threatened (IUCN 3.1)

Scientific classification
- Kingdom: Animalia
- Phylum: Mollusca
- Class: Gastropoda
- Order: Stylommatophora
- Family: Hygromiidae
- Genus: Monachoides
- Species: M. kosovoensis

Binomial name
- Monachoides kosovoensis (De Winter & Maassen, 1992)

Species of gastropods

Monachoides kosovoensis is a species of air‑breathing land snail in the family Hygromiidae. It is known only from a high‑elevation locality in eastern Kosovo.

== Taxonomy ==
Monachoides kosovoensis was described by Anton J. de Winter and W.J.M. Maassen in 1992 from specimens collected on the eastern slope of Čakor Pass in Kosovo. The authors provisionally placed it in the genus Monachoides Gude & Woodward, 1921, although they noted that the presence of a small second dart‑sac in the genitalia is unusual for that genus and may warrant future reassessment of its generic assignment.

== Description ==
The shell of M. kosovoensis is moderately elevated, reaching up to about 13 mm in maximum diameter and 8.9 mm in height, with 5.3–6 whorls. It is pale brown, becoming lighter towards the sutures, and bears a lighter band around the periphery. Both the upper and lower surfaces have a fine granulose sculpture—numerous tiny bead‑like protuberances that merge into faint ridges near the sutures. The spire is distinctly raised and the whorls are slightly inflated. The umbilicus (the central hollow visible on the underside) is narrow, cylindrical and about one‑fifth of the shell's width. The aperture is wider than tall, with a broadly reflexed basal lip (the inward‑turned edge) and a low internal ridge.

== Distribution and habitat ==
Monachoides kosovoensis is known only from its type locality on the eastern slope of Čakor Pass (elevation about 1600 metres) in the "Bjeshket e nemuna" of eastern Kosovo. Specimens were found on the trunks of pine trees along a small mountain brook, suggesting a preference for cool, humid montane woodland, where they may graze on the biofilm on bark and nearby stones.
