= Cryptosaccus asturiensis =

Conservation status
- Vulnerable (IUCN 3.1)

Scientific classification
- Kingdom: Animalia
- Phylum: Mollusca
- Class: Gastropoda
- Order: Stylommatophora
- Family: Hygromiidae
- Genus: Cryptosaccus
- Species: C. asturiensis

Binomial name
- Cryptosaccus asturiensis Prieto & Puente, 1994

Species of gastropod

Cryptosaccus asturiensis is a species of air-breathing land snails, terrestrial pulmonate gastropod mollusks in the family of Hygromiidae, the hairy snails and their allies. This species is endemic to Spain.
