= Hygromia golasi =

Conservation status
- Vulnerable (IUCN 2.3)

Scientific classification
- Kingdom: Animalia
- Phylum: Mollusca
- Class: Gastropoda
- Order: Stylommatophora
- Family: Hygromiidae
- Genus: Hygromia
- Species: H. golasi

Binomial name
- Hygromia golasi Prieto & Puente, 1992

Species of gastropod

Hygromia golasi is a species of small air-breathing land snail, a terrestrial pulmonate gastropod mollusc in the family Hygromiidae, the hairy snails and their allies. This species is endemic to Andorra.
