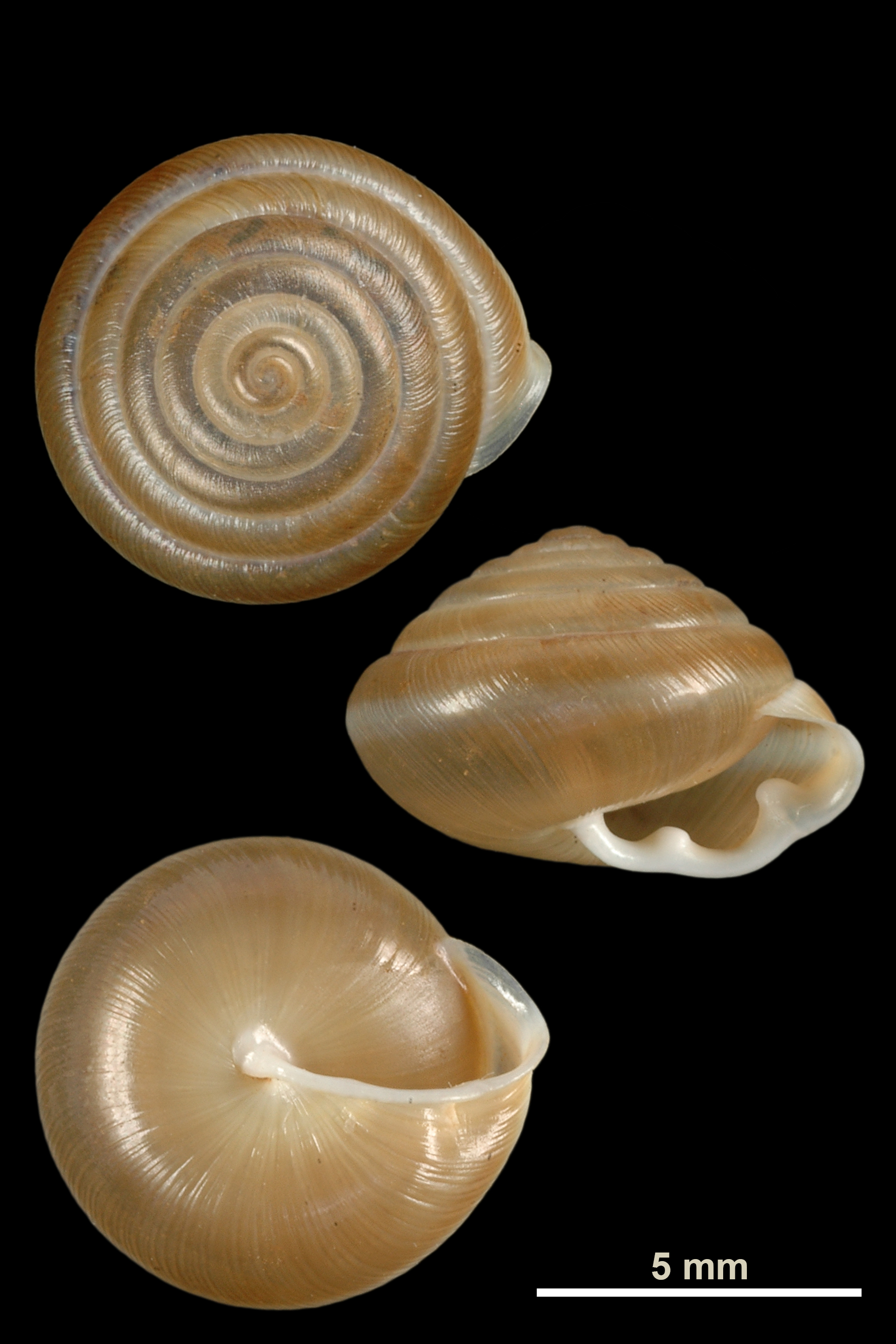
- Shell of Perforatella bidentata (specimen at MNHN, Paris)

Scientific classification
- Domain: Eukaryota
- Kingdom: Animalia
- Phylum: Mollusca
- Class: Gastropoda
- Order: Stylommatophora
- Family: Hygromiidae
- Genus: Perforatella
- Species: P. bidentata

Binomial name
- Perforatella bidentata (Gmelin, 1791)

Synonyms
- Helix (Conulus) bidens Chemnitz (unavailable name: published in a work rejected by ICZN direction 1); Helix bidentata Gmelin, 1791; Perforatella (Perforatella) bidentata (Gmelin, 1791)

= Perforatella bidentata =

Species of gastropod

Perforatella bidentata is a species of air-breathing land snail, a terrestrial pulmonate gastropod mollusk in the family Hygromiidae, the hairy snails and their allies.

== Life cycle ==
The size of the egg is 1.7 × 2 mm.

This species of snail makes and uses love darts during mating.

== Distribution ==
This species is known to occur in:

- Ukraine
- France
