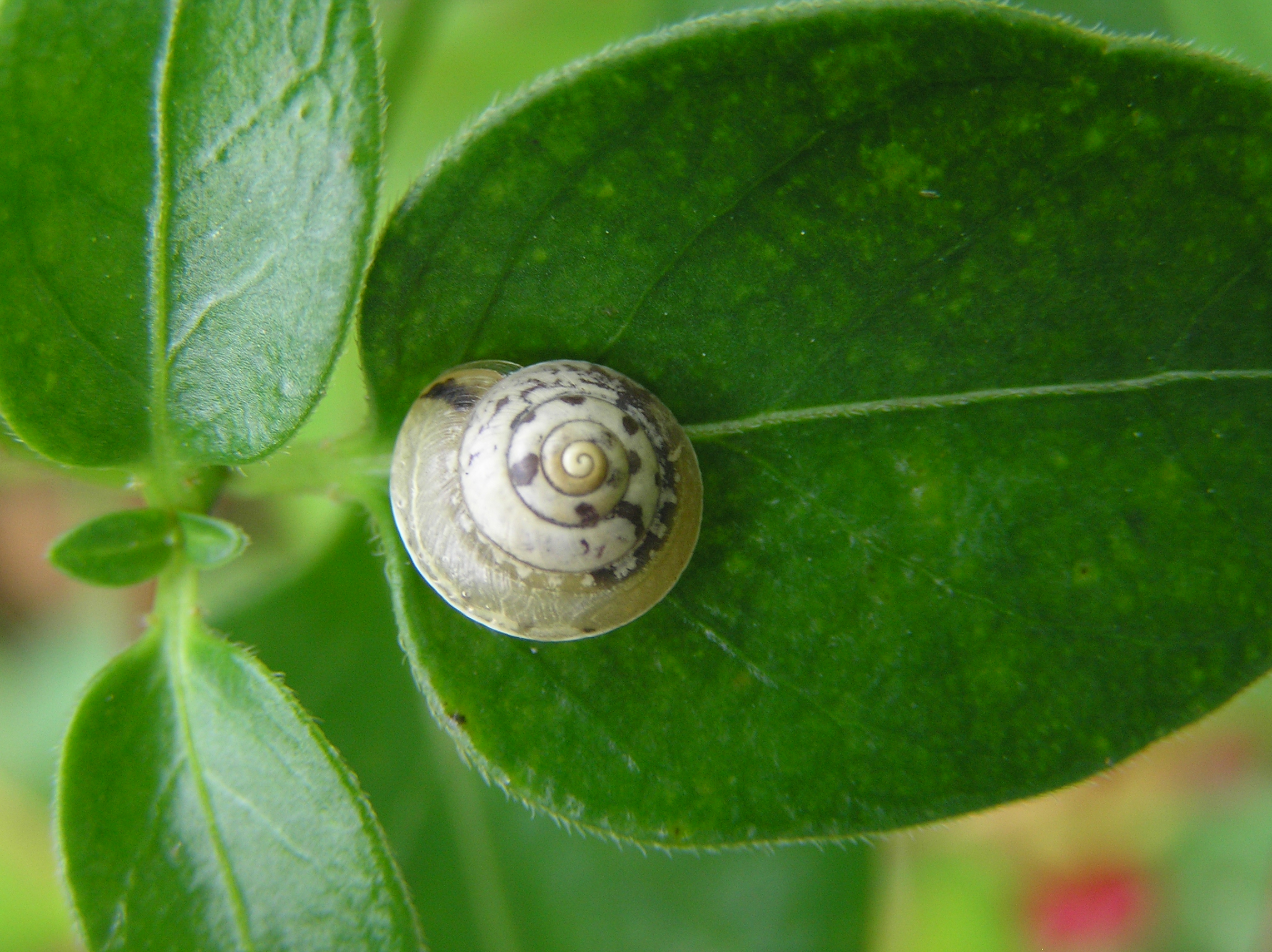
- A live individual of Hygromia cinctella

Scientific classification
- Domain: Eukaryota
- Kingdom: Animalia
- Phylum: Mollusca
- Class: Gastropoda
- Order: Stylommatophora
- Infraorder: Helicoidei
- Superfamily: Helicoidea
- Family: Hygromiidae
- Genus: Hygromia; Risso, 1826

Synonyms
- Cinctelliana Caziot, 1908; Helix (Hygromia) Risso, 1826; Hygromane Moquin-Tandon, 1855; Hygromia (Hygromia) Risso, 1826· accepted, alternate representation; Hygromia (Riedelia) Schileyko, 1972· accepted, alternate representation; Limbatiana Caziot, 1910

= Hygromia =

Genus of gastropods

Hygromia is a genus of air-breathing land snails, terrestrial pulmonate gastropod mollusks in the family Hygromiidae, the hairy snails and their allies.

== Species ==
Species within the genus Hygromia include:

- † Hygromia carinatissima (Sacco, 1886)
- Hygromia cinctella Draparnaud, 1801
- Hygromia golasi Prieto & Puente, 1992
- Hygromia limbata (Draparnaud, 1805)
- Hygromia montana
- Hygromia odeca (Bourguignat, 1882)
- Hygromia riopida
- Hygromia striolata
- Hygromia tassyi (Bourguignat, 1884)

Species brought into synonymy

- Hygromia folliculata Risso, 1826: synonym of Ciliella ciliata (W. Hartmann, 1821) (junior synonym)
- Hygromia kovacsi Varga & Pintér, 1972: synonym of Kovacsia kovacsi (Varga & L. Pintér, 1972) (original combination)
- Hygromia notophila Cockerell, 1924: synonym of Lindholmomneme notophila (Cockerell, 1924) (original combination)
- Hygromia radleyi Jousseaume, 1894: synonym of Landouria radleyi (Jousseaume, 1894) (original combination)
- Hygromia transsylvanica (Westerlund, 1876): synonym of Lozekia transsylvanica (Westerlund, 1876)
