= Perforatella dibothrion =

Scientific classification
- Domain: Eukaryota
- Kingdom: Animalia
- Phylum: Mollusca
- Class: Gastropoda
- Order: Stylommatophora
- Family: Hygromiidae
- Genus: Perforatella
- Species: P. dibothrion

Binomial name
- Perforatella dibothrion (E. A. Bielz, 1860)

Species of gastropod

Perforatella dibothrion is a species of air-breathing land snail, a terrestrial pulmonate gastropod mollusc in the family Hygromiidae.

== Distribution ==
This species is known to occur in:

- Slovakia
- Ukraine
