= Hygromiinae =

Scientific classification
- Kingdom: Animalia
- Phylum: Mollusca
- Class: Gastropoda
- Order: Stylommatophora
- Family: Hygromiidae
- Subfamily: Hygromiinae; Tryon, 1866

Subfamily of gastropods

Hygromiinae is a taxonomic subfamily of land snails, terrestrial gastropod molluscs in the family Hygromiidae, the hairy snails and their allies.

== Tribes ==
- tribe Hygromiini Tryon, 1866 - synonym: Cernuellini Schileyko, 1991
  - Hygromia Risso, 1826
  - Zenobiellina D. T. Holyoak & G. A. Holyoak, 2018
- tribe Perforatellini Neiber, Razkin & Hausdorf, 2017
  - Chilanodon Westerlund, 1897
  - Kovacsia H. Nordsieck, 1993
  - Lindholmomneme F. Haas, 1936
  - Lozekia Hudec, 1970
  - Monachoides Gude & B. B. Woodward, 1921
  - Noneulota Schileyko & Horsák, 2007
  - Perforatella Schlüter, 1838
  - Pseudotrichia Schileyko, 1970
  - Stygius Schileyko, 1970
