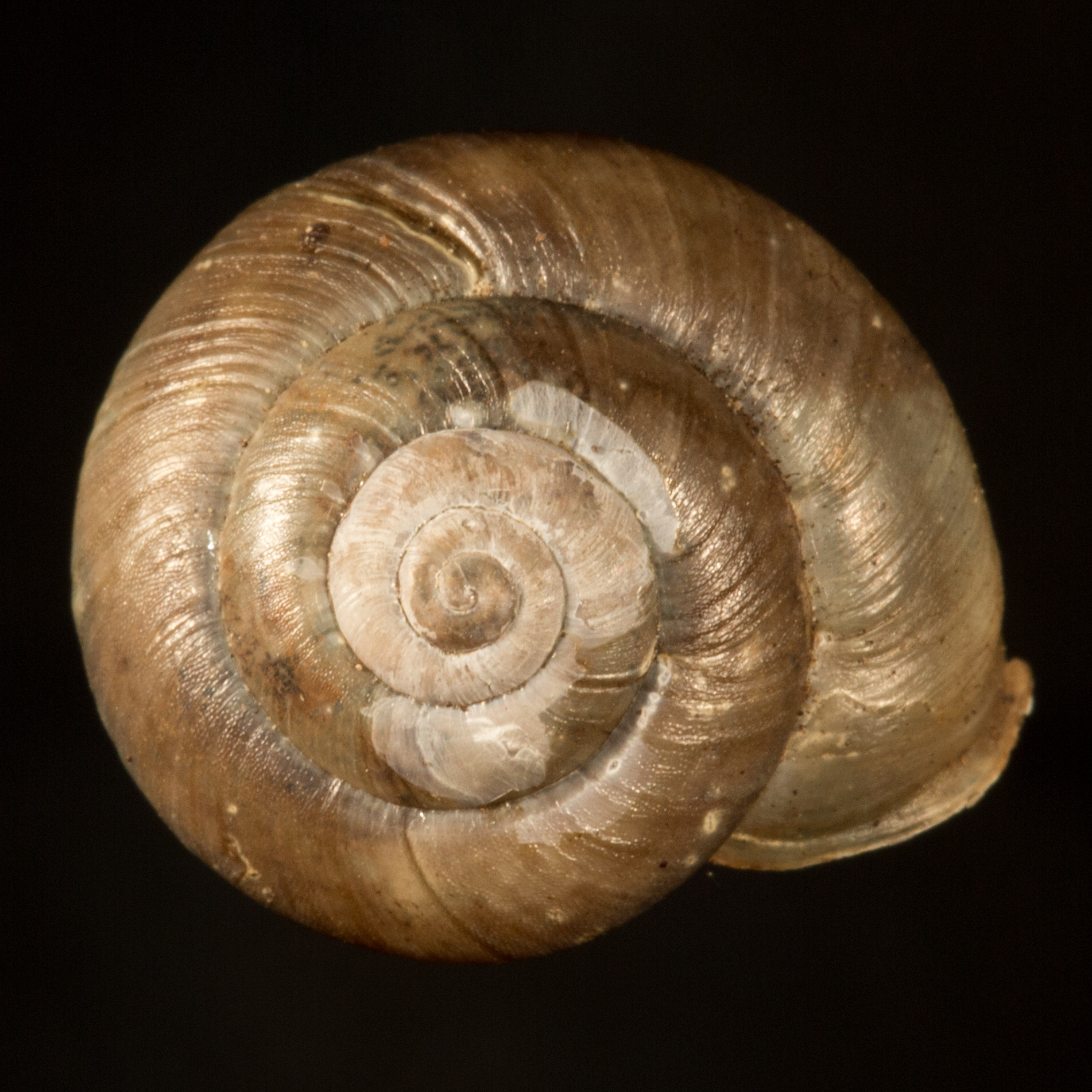
- An apical view of a shell of Urticicola umbrosus
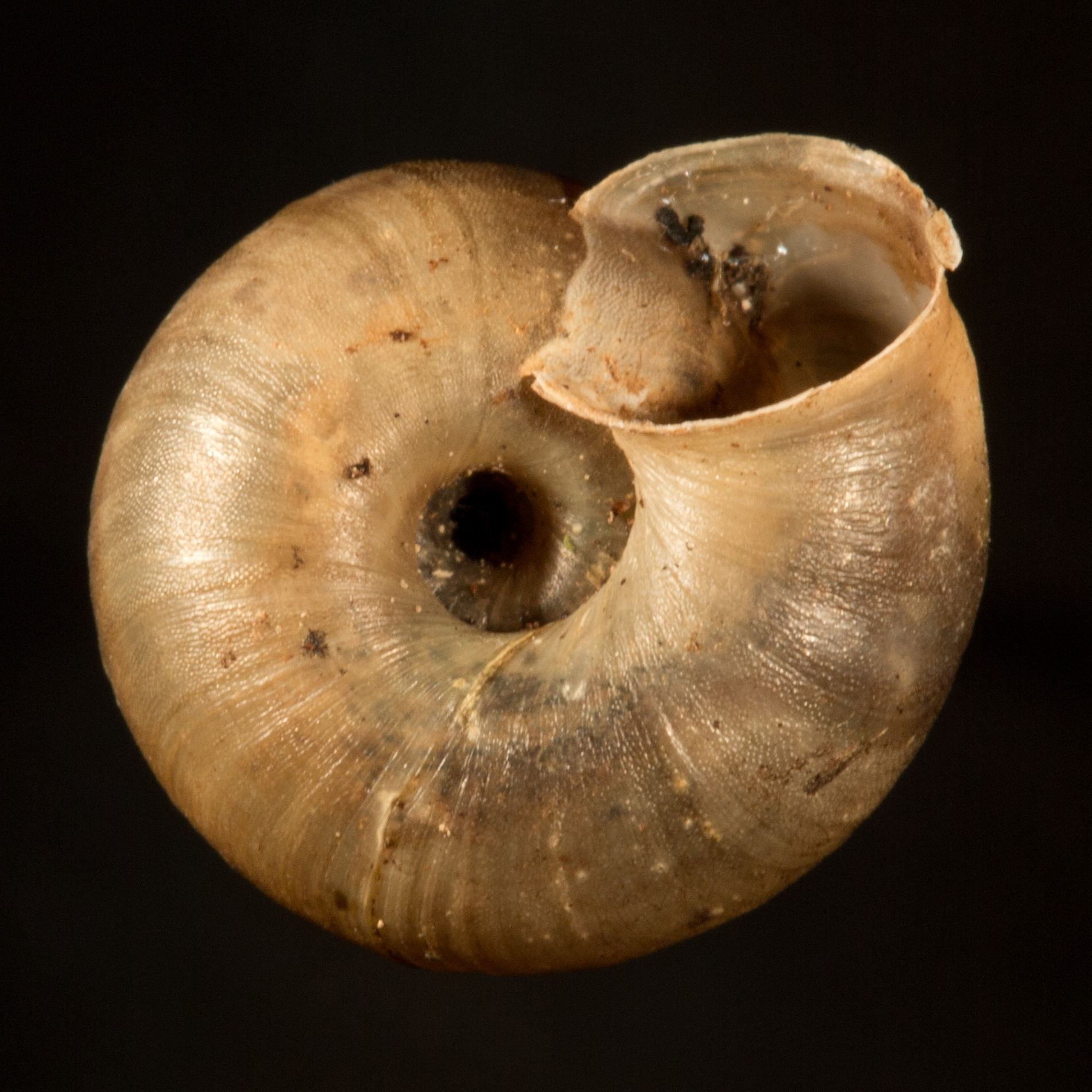
- A basal view of the shell

Conservation status
- Least Concern (IUCN 3.1)

Scientific classification
- Kingdom: Animalia
- Phylum: Mollusca
- Class: Gastropoda
- Order: Stylommatophora
- Family: Hygromiidae
- Genus: Urticicola
- Species: U. umbrosus

Binomial name
- Urticicola umbrosus (C. Pfeiffer, 1828)

Synonyms
- Helix (Fruticicola) umbrosa C. Pfeiffer, 1828 (unaccepted combination); Helix umbrosa C. Pfeiffer, 1828 (original combination); Perforatella (Monachoides) umbrosa (C. Pfeiffer, 1828)

= Urticicola umbrosus =

Species of gastropod

Urticicola umbrosus is a species of air-breathing land snail, a terrestrial pulmonate gastropod mollusk in the family Hygromiidae, the hairy snails and their allies.

== Description ==
The height of the shell varies between 5.5 and 7 mm (0.22 and 0.28 in) its width varies between 10 and 13 mm (0.39 and 0.51 in).

The thin shell is fragile and translucent. It is turbinately globose, closely wound. The spire has a flat and conical shape. It contains 5½ whorls. The periphery of the last one shows a blunt ridge, that disappears before it reaches the aperture. The aperture is obliquely lunate. The umbilicus is very wide and measures about half the width of the shell.

== Distribution ==
This species occurs primarily in mountain forests in Austria, Germany, Italy, Switzerland and Slovenia.

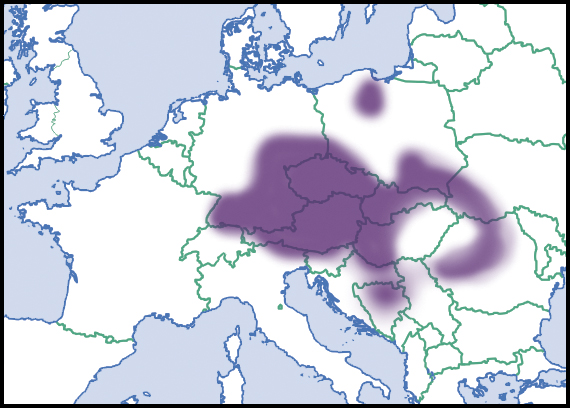
Distribution
