= Ciliellopsis oglasae =

Conservation status
- Vulnerable (IUCN 3.1)

Scientific classification
- Kingdom: Animalia
- Phylum: Mollusca
- Class: Gastropoda
- Order: Stylommatophora
- Family: Hygromiidae
- Genus: Ciliellopsis
- Species: C. oglasae

Binomial name
- Ciliellopsis oglasae Giusti & Manganelli, 1990

Species of gastropod

Ciliellopsis oglasae is a species of air-breathing land snails, terrestrial pulmonate gastropod mollusks in the family Hygromiidae, the hairy snails and their allies.

This species is endemic to Italy. Its natural habitat is temperate forests. It is threatened by habitat loss.
