= Ichnusomunda sacchii =

Conservation status
- Critically Endangered (IUCN 3.1)

Scientific classification
- Kingdom: Animalia
- Phylum: Mollusca
- Class: Gastropoda
- Order: Stylommatophora
- Family: Hygromiidae
- Genus: Ichnusomunda
- Species: I. sacchii

Binomial name
- Ichnusomunda sacchii Giusti & Manganelli, 1998

Species of gastropod

Ichnusomunda sacchii is a species of air-breathing land snails, terrestrial pulmonate gastropod mollusks in the family Hygromiidae, the hairy snails and their allies.

This species is endemic to Italy. Its natural habitats are temperate grassland and sandy shores. It is threatened by habitat loss.
