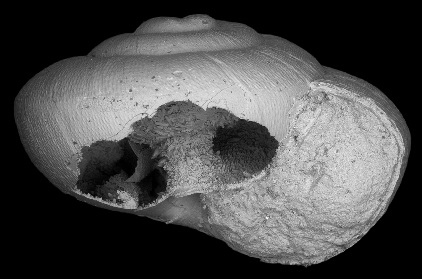
- Urticicola perchtae, holotype

Scientific classification
- Kingdom: Animalia
- Phylum: Mollusca
- Class: Gastropoda
- Order: Stylommatophora
- Family: Hygromiidae
- Genus: Urticicola
- Species: †U. perchtae

Binomial name
- †Urticicola perchtae Salvador, 2013

= Urticicola perchtae =

Urticicola perchtae Temporal range: Miocene

Extinct species of gastropod

Urticicola perchtae is a fossil species of air-breathing land snail, a terrestrial pulmonate gastropod mollusk in the family Helicidae, from the Early/Middle Miocene of Sandelzhausen (type locality) and Oggenhausen, southern Germany.
