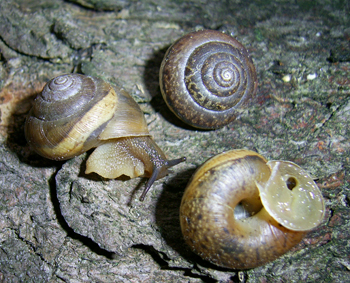
- Euomphalia strigella

Scientific classification
- Kingdom: Animalia
- Phylum: Mollusca
- Class: Gastropoda
- Order: Stylommatophora
- Infraorder: Helicoidei
- Superfamily: Helicoidea
- Family: Hygromiidae
- Genus: Euomphalia; Westerlund, 1889

Synonyms
- Euomphalia (Euomphalia) Westerlund, 1889; Strigelliana Fagot, 1893

= Euomphalia =

Genus of gastropods

Euomphalia is a genus of air-breathing land snails, terrestrial pulmonate gastropod mollusks in the subfamily Trochulininae of the family Hygromiidae, the hairy snails and their allies.

== Species ==
Species within the genus Euomphalia include:

- Euomphalia aristata (Krynicki, 1836)
- Euomphalia bactriana (Hutton, 1849)
- Euomphalia mediata (Westerlund, 1888)
- Euomphalia strigella (Draparnaud, 1801)

Subgenera and species brought into synonymy

- Euomphalia (Euomphalia) Westerlund, 1889 synonym of Euomphalia Westerlund, 1889
- Euomphalia (Harmozica) maiae (Hudec & Lezhawa, 1969): synonym of Batumica maiae (Hudec & Lezhawa, 1969) (original combination)
- Euomphalia (Hesseola) Lindholm, 1927 synonym of Hesseola Lindholm, 1927 (original rank)
- Euomphalia (Lindholmomneme) F. Haas, 1936 synonym of Lindholmomneme F. Haas, 1936 (original rank)
- Euomphalia (Micromphalia) Lindholm, 1927 synonym of Stenomphalia Lindholm, 1927 (inavailable; a junior homonym of Micromphalia Ancey, 1882)
- Euomphalia (Oscarboettgeria) Lindholm, 1927 synonym of Oscarboettgeria Lindholm, 1927 (original rank)
- Euomphalia (Stenomphalia) Lindholm, 1927 synonym of Stenomphalia Lindholm, 1927
- Euomphalia (Stenomphalia) turcica Schütt, 1985 † synonym of Stenomphalia turcica (Schütt, 1985) † (Stenomphalia is considered a distinct genus)
- Euomphalia sprattiana (De Stefani in De Stefani et al., 1891) † synonym of Monacha sprattiana (De Stefani in De Stefani et al., 1891) †
