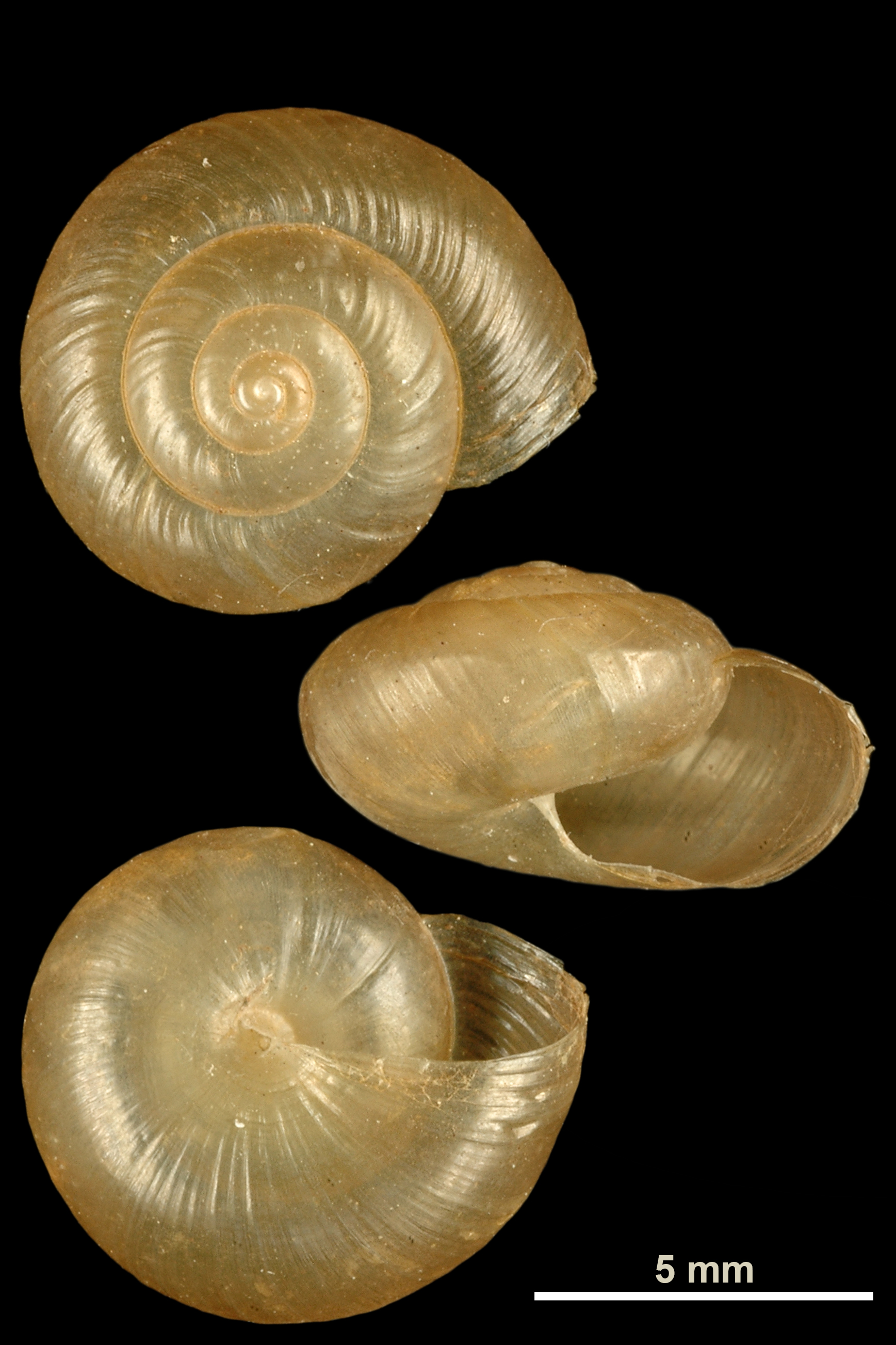
- Shell of Zenobiella subrufescens (specimen at MNHN, Paris)

Scientific classification
- Kingdom: Animalia
- Phylum: Mollusca
- Class: Gastropoda
- Order: Stylommatophora
- Superfamily: Helicoidea
- Family: Hygromiidae
- Genus: Zenobiellina
- Species: Z. subrufescens

Binomial name
- Zenobiellina subrufescens (Miller, 1822)

Synonyms
- Helix subrufescens Miller, 1822; Perforatella (Zenobiella) subrufescens (J. S. Miller, 1822) (unaccepted combination); Zenobiella subrufescens (J. S. Miller, 1822) (superseded generic combination)

= Zenobiellina subrufescens =

Species of gastropod

Zenobiellina subrufescens is a species of small air-breathing land snail, a pulmonate gastropod mollusk in the subfamily Hygromiinae of the family Hygromiidae.

== Description ==
For terms see gastropod shell

The 4-6 x 6-10 mm shell has 4.5-5 convex whorls with moderate suture. It is slightly shouldered above the periphery, the aperture is usually without a lip inside and the umbilicus is very narrow, and partly covered by the reflected columellar margin. The shell is pale brown, very finely striated, thin and transparent.

== Distribution ==
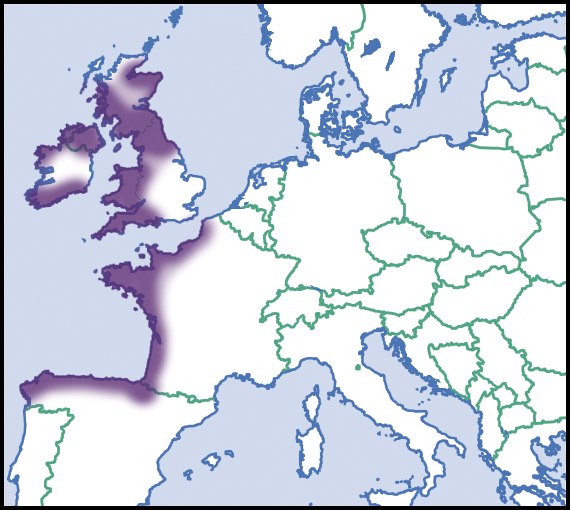
Distribution

This species is known to occur in:

- Great Britain and Ireland
- France
- Spain

== Life cycle ==
The size of the egg is 1.5 × 1 mm.
