= Mengoana =

Scientific classification
- Domain: Eukaryota
- Kingdom: Animalia
- Phylum: Mollusca
- Class: Gastropoda
- Order: Stylommatophora
- Family: Hygromiidae
- Genus: Mengoana; Ortiz de Zárate López, 1951

Genus of land snails

Mengoana is a genus of gastropods belonging to the family Hygromiidae.

The species of this genus are found in Pyrenees.

Species:

- Mengoana brigantina
- Mengoana jeschaui (Kobelt, 1878)
