= Lozekia transsilvanica =

Scientific classification
- Kingdom: Animalia
- Phylum: Mollusca
- Class: Gastropoda
- Order: Stylommatophora
- Family: Hygromiidae
- Genus: Lozekia
- Species: L. transsilvanica

Binomial name
- Lozekia transsilvanica (Westerlund, 1876)

Synonyms
- Helix (Trichia) transsilvanica Westerlund, 1876; Hygromia transsylvanica (Westerlund, 1876)

Species of gastropod

Lozekia transsilvanica is a species of small air-breathing land snail, a terrestrial pulmonate gastropod mollusk in the family Hygromiidae, the hairy snails and their allies. This species is also known as Hygromia transsylvanica.

== Distribution ==
This species occurs in:

- Slovakia
- Romania
- Hungary

== Description ==
The shell of Lozekia transsilvanica is horny grey, greenish or yellowish brown in color, and is extremely finely striated. The surface has fine and short (0.08-0.25 mm) riblets (120-160/mm^{2}). The shell has 5 weakly convex whorls, which rapidly increase in size. The last whorl is inflated and has a weak edge at the periphery, which is slowly and straightly descending near the aperture. The margin is straight and thin. The umbilicus is very narrow and is almost covered by the reflected columellar margin.

The width of the shell is 5.5-6.5 mm. The height of the shell is 4.5–6 mm.

Lozekia transsilvanica differs from Lozekia kovacsi in its larger (120-160 per square mm in Lozekia transsilvanica, 180-500 in Lozekia kovacsi) and longer riblets (Lozekia transsilvanica 0.08-0.25 mm, Lozekia kovacsi 0.055-0.09 mm).
