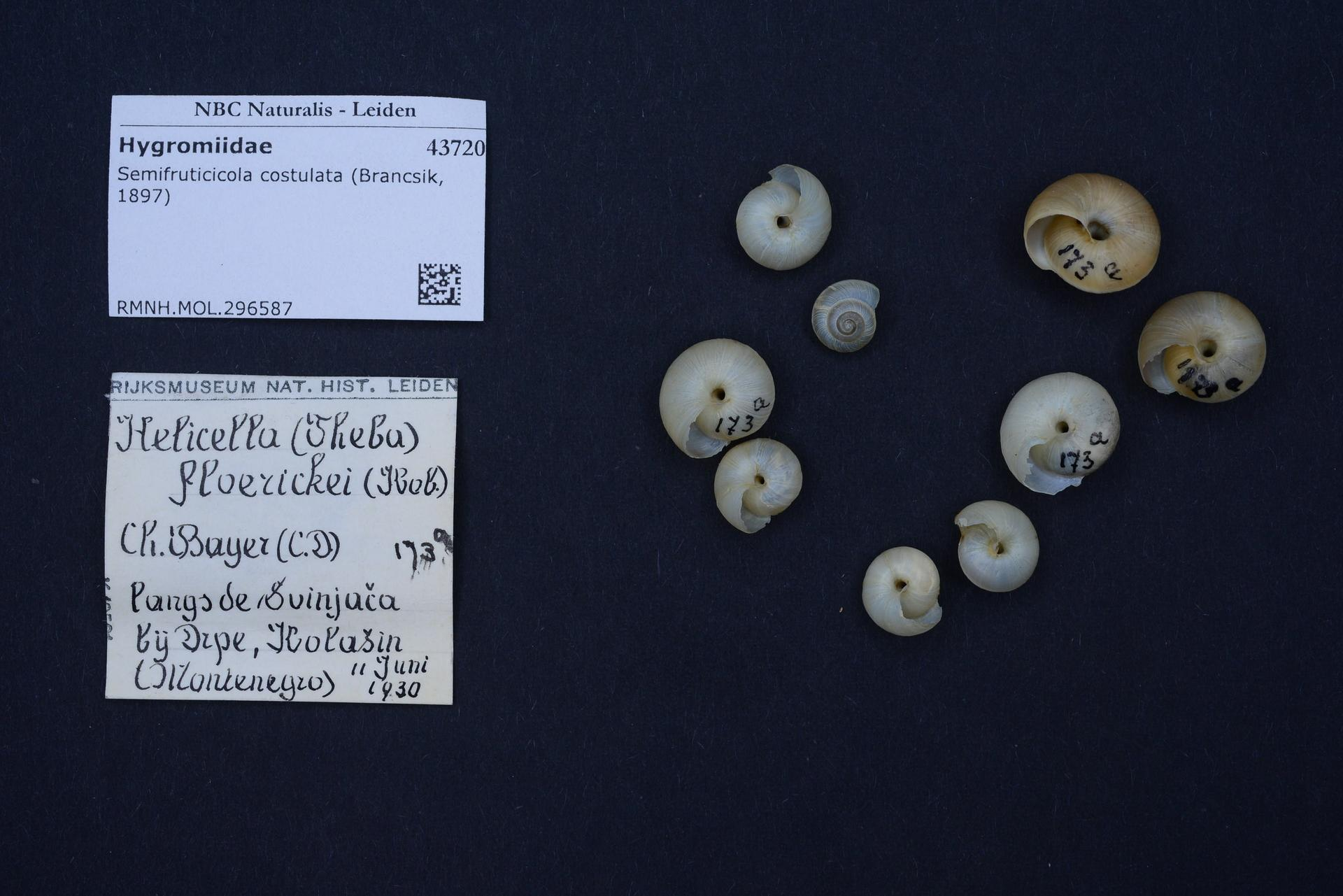

Scientific classification
- Kingdom: Animalia
- Phylum: Mollusca
- Class: Gastropoda
- Order: Stylommatophora
- Family: Hygromiidae
- Genus: Semifruticicola; A. J. Wagner, 1914
- Species: S. serbica

Binomial name
- Semifruticicola serbica A. J. Wagner, 1914

Synonyms
- Semifruticicola costulata (Brancsik, 1897)

= Semifruticicola =

Genus of land snails

Semifruticicola is a monotypic genus of gastropods belonging to the family Hygromiidae. The only species is Semifruticicola serbica.

The species is found in the Balkans.
