= Kovacsia kovacsi =

Scientific classification
- Domain: Eukaryota
- Kingdom: Animalia
- Phylum: Mollusca
- Class: Gastropoda
- Order: Stylommatophora
- Family: Hygromiidae
- Genus: Kovacsia
- Species: K. kovacsi

Binomial name
- Kovacsia kovacsi (Varga & L. Pintér, 1972)

Synonyms
- Hygromia kovacsi Varga & L. Pintér, 1972 (original combination)

Species of gastropod

Kovacsia kovacsi, is a species of small air-breathing land snail, a terrestrial pulmonate gastropod mollusk in the family Hygromiidae, the hairy snails and their allies.

== Distribution ==
This species occurs in Eastern Europe, in Hungary and in Romania.
