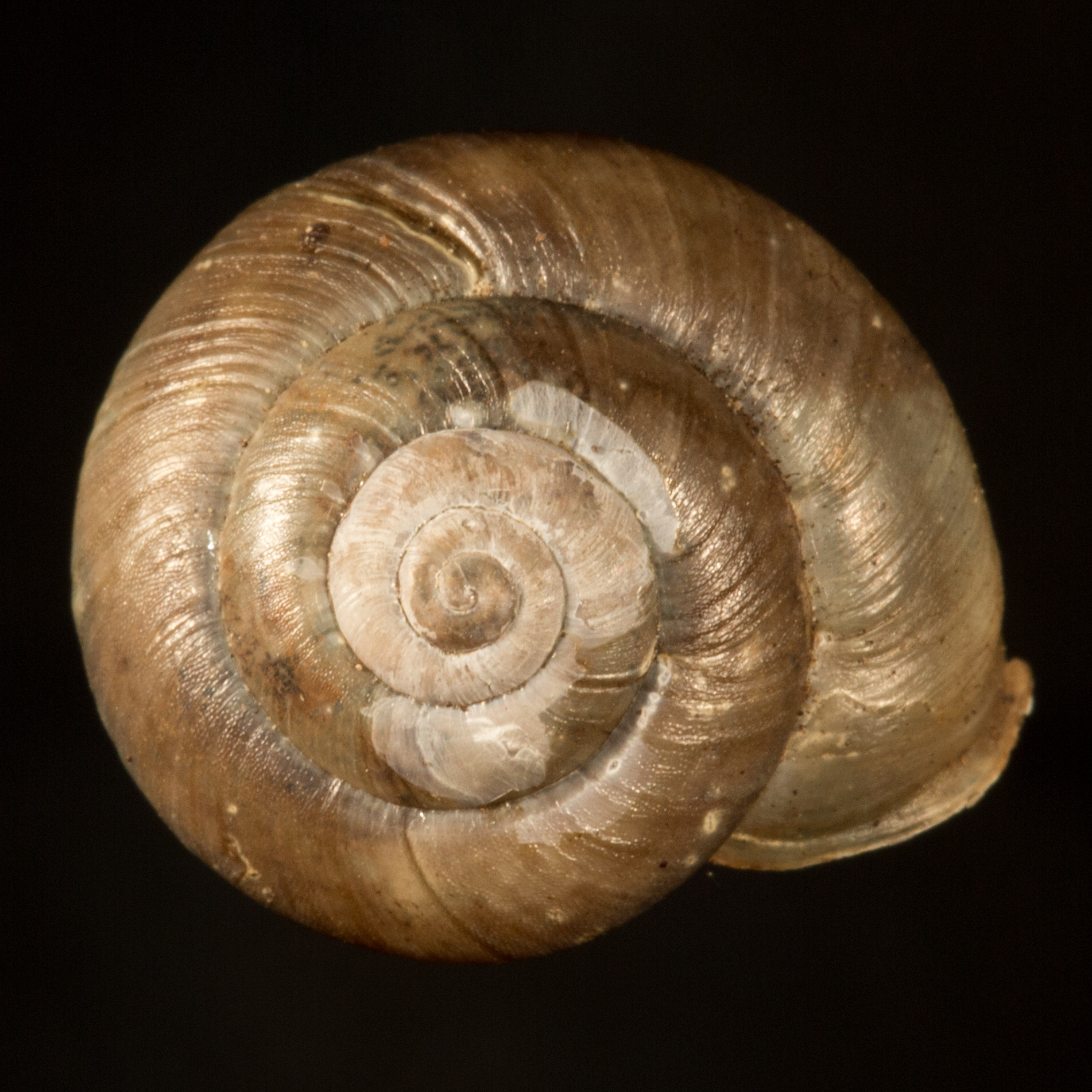
- An apical view of a shell of Urticicola umbrosus

Scientific classification
- Kingdom: Animalia
- Phylum: Mollusca
- Class: Gastropoda
- Order: Stylommatophora
- Infraorder: Helicoidei
- Superfamily: Helicoidea
- Family: Hygromiidae
- Genus: Urticicola; S Lindholm, 1927

Type species
- Helix umbrosa C. Pfeiffer, 1828

Synonyms
- Telonensiana Caziot, 1909; Zenobiella (Urticicola) Lindholm, 1927 (original rank)

= Urticicola =

Urticicola Temporal range: Miocene–Recent

Genus of gastropods

Urticicola is a genus of air-breathing land snails, terrestrial pulmonate gastropod mollusks in the subfamily Trochulininae of the family Hygromiidae, the hairy snails and their allies.

== Species ==
Species within the genus Urticicola include:

- Urticicola glabellus (Draparnaud, 1801) – type species
- Urticicola isaricus (Locard, 1882)
- Urticicola mounierensis (Caziot, 1909)
- Urticicola moutonii (Dupuy, 1847)
- † Urticicola perchtae Salvador, 2013 – Middle Miocene, Germany
- † Urticicola schlickumi H. Nordsieck, 2014
- Urticicola suberinus (Bérenguier, 1882)
- Urticicola umbrosus (Pfeiffer, 1828)

Synonyms

- Urticicola ventouxiana (L. Forcart, 1946): synonym of Urticicola isaricus ventouxianus (Forcart, 1946)
