= Cryptosaccus =

Scientific classification
- Domain: Eukaryota
- Kingdom: Animalia
- Phylum: Mollusca
- Class: Gastropoda
- Order: Stylommatophora
- Family: Hygromiidae
- Genus: Cryptosaccus; Prieto & Puente, 1994

Genus of gastropods

Cryptosaccus is a genus of air-breathing land snails, terrestrial pulmonate gastropod mollusks in the family Hygromiidae, the hairy snails and their allies.

== Species ==
Species within the genus Cryptosaccus include:

- Cryptosaccus asturiensis
