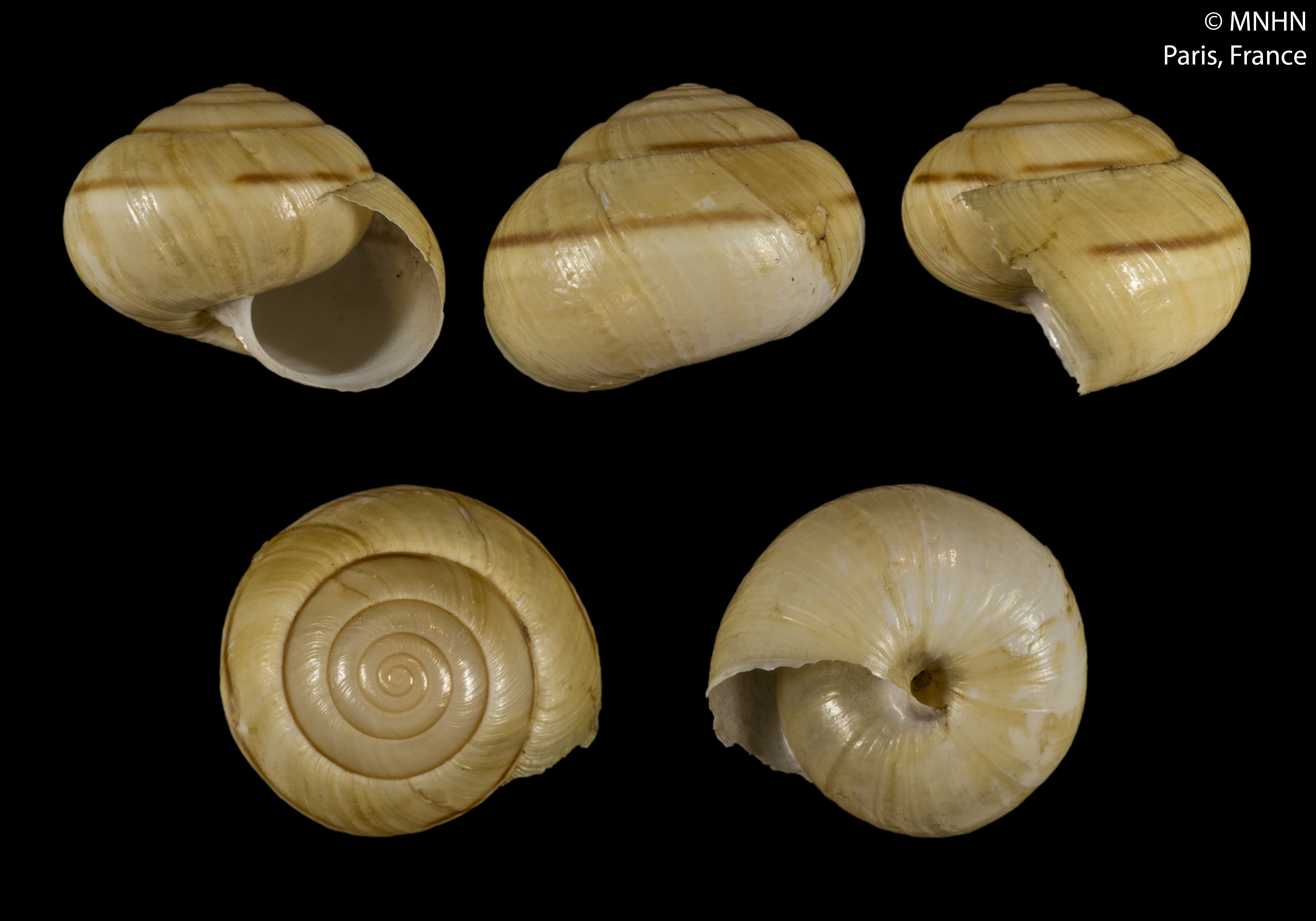
- Shell of Portugala inchoata (syntype at MNHN, Paris)

Conservation status
- Least Concern (IUCN 3.1)

Scientific classification
- Kingdom: Animalia
- Phylum: Mollusca
- Class: Gastropoda
- Order: Stylommatophora
- Family: Hygromiidae
- Subfamily: Leptaxinae
- Genus: Portugala; E. Gittenberger, 1980
- Species: P. inchoata

Binomial name
- Portugala inchoata (Morelet, 1845)
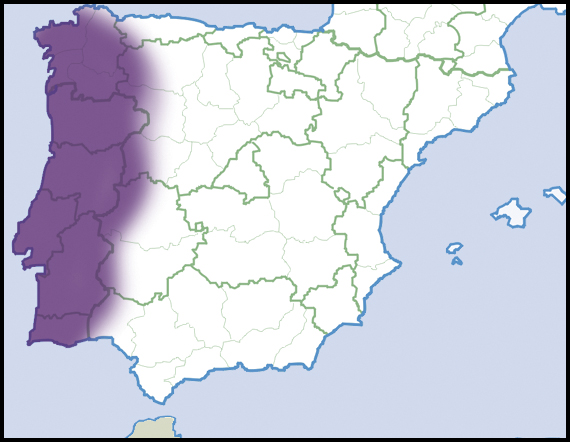

Synonyms
- Helix inchoata Morelet, 1845

= Portugala =

Genus of land snails

Portugala is a monotypic genus of land snails native to the western Iberian Peninsula in Portugal and Galicia (Spain).

It has a single species, Portugala inchoata, which can grow to 15 mm.

== Gallery ==
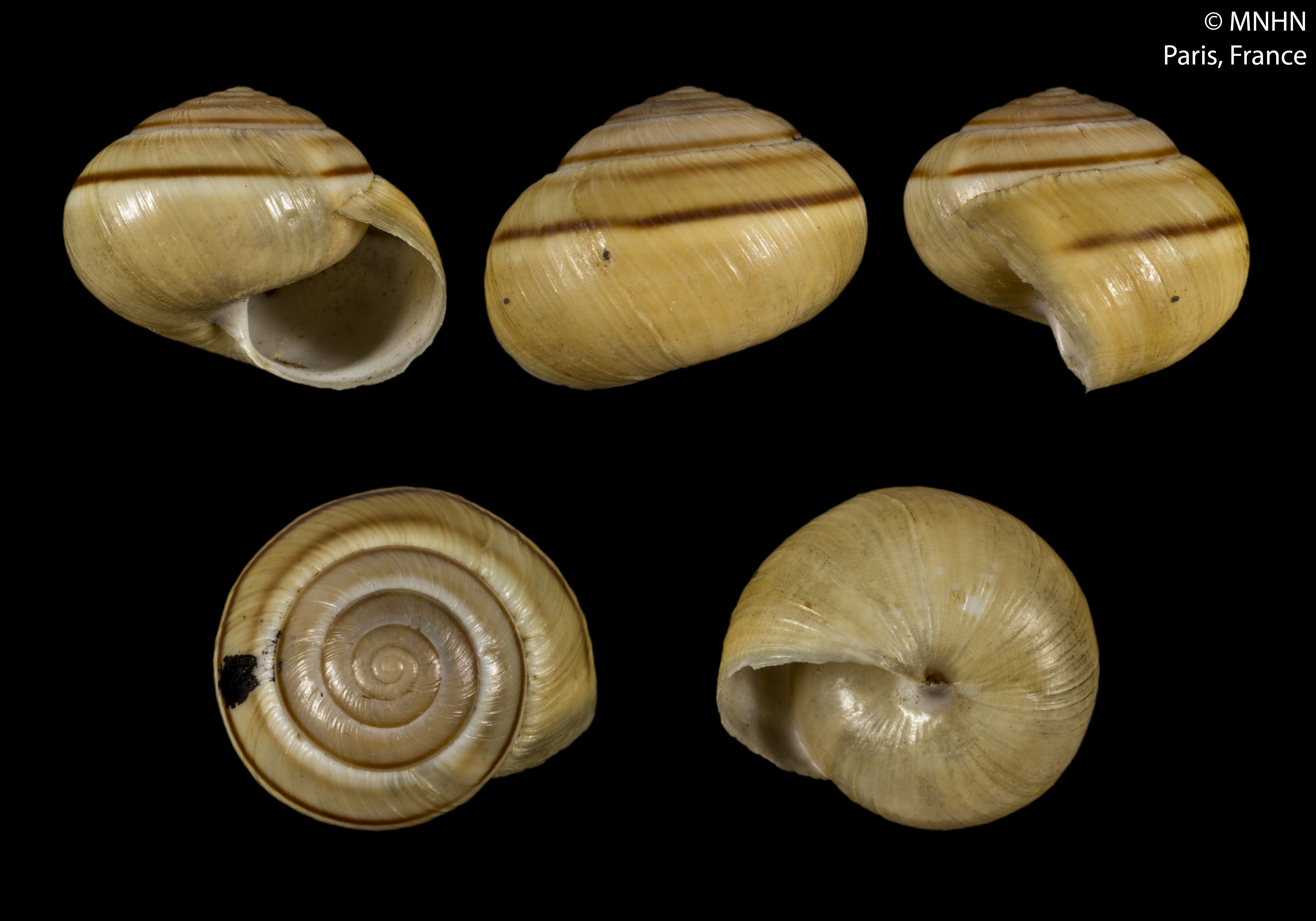

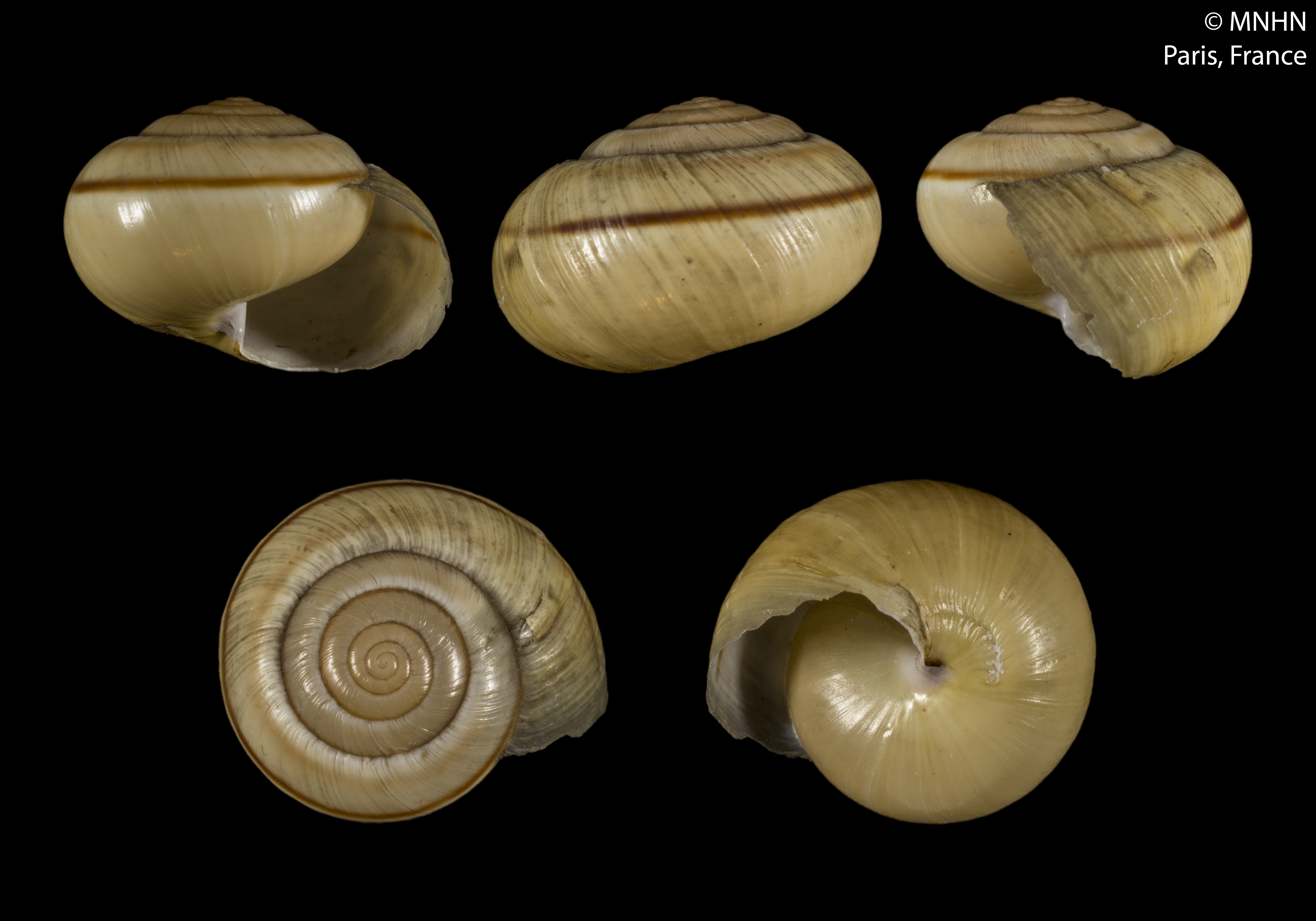
