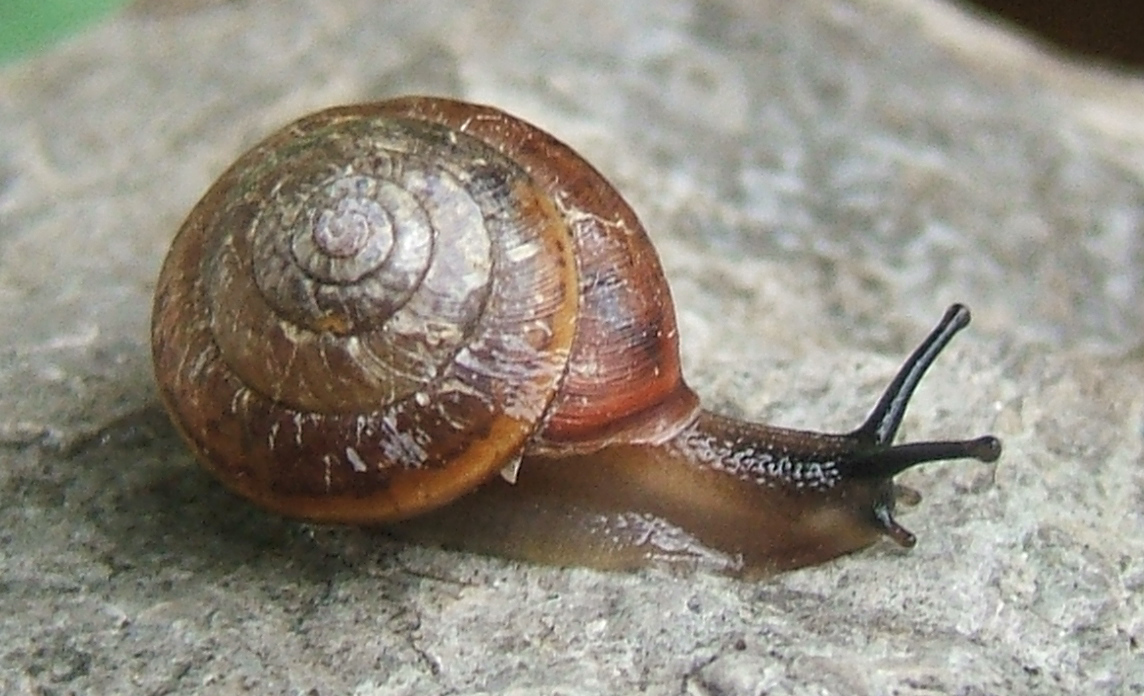

Conservation status
- Least Concern (IUCN 3.1)

Scientific classification
- Kingdom: Animalia
- Phylum: Mollusca
- Class: Gastropoda
- Order: Stylommatophora
- Family: Hygromiidae
- Genus: Monachoides
- Species: M. incarnatus

Binomial name
- Monachoides incarnatus (O. F. Müller, 1774)

Synonyms
- Helix incarnata Müller, 1774; Perforatella (Monachoides) incarnata (O. F. Müller, 1774); Perforatella incarnata (O. F. Müller, 1774) (superseded generic combination)

= Monachoides incarnatus =

Species of gastropod

Monachoides incarnatus (syn. Perforatella incarnata) is a species of air-breathing land snail in the terrestrial pulmonate gastropod mollusk family Hygromiidae, the hairy snails and their allies.

Subspecies

- Monachoides incarnatus amatus (Stabile, 1859)
- Monachoides incarnatus incarnatus (O. F. Müller, 1774)
- Monachoides incarnatus welebitanus (L. Pfeiffer, 1848)

== Distribution ==
This snail species is widespread in Europe, and most abundant in Central Europe. It can be found in the Czech Republic, Bulgaria, Netherlands, Poland, Slovakia, Ukraine, and many other countries.

== Biology ==
This species of snail creates and uses love darts as part of its mating behavior.

The egg is 2 millimeters wide.

== Conservation ==
This common species has stable populations facing no apparent threats, and no specific conservation actions are underway.
