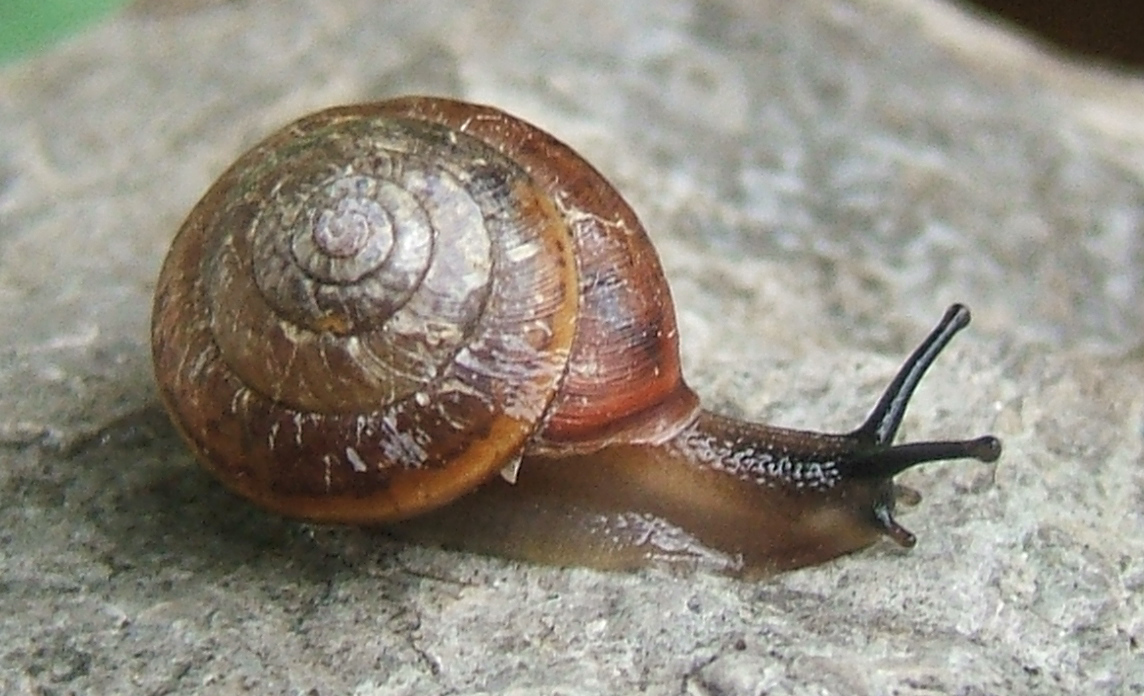
- Monachoides incarnatus

Scientific classification
- Kingdom: Animalia
- Phylum: Mollusca
- Class: Gastropoda
- Order: Stylommatophora
- Superfamily: Helicoidea
- Family: Hygromiidae
- Subfamily: Hygromiinae
- Genus: Monachoides; Gude & Woodward, 1921

= Monachoides =

Genus of gastropods

Monachoides is a genus of air-breathing land snails, terrestrial pulmonate gastropod mollusks in the family Hygromiidae, the hairy snails and their allies.

Some species of snails in this genus create and use love darts as part of their mating behavior.

== Species ==
The following species are recognised within the genus Monachoides:

- Monachoides bacescui (Grossu, 1979)
- †Monachoides barotiana Marinescu, 1975
- Monachoides fallax (Wagner, 1914)
- Monachoides incarnatus (Müller, 1774) - the type species, sometimes the adjectival species name is treated as if the genus name had a feminine gender: Monarchoides incarnata
- Monachoides kosovoensis (De Winter & Maassen, 1992)
- Monachoides taraensis (De Winter & Maassen, 1992)
- Monachoides vicinus (Rossmässler, 1842)
