= Ichnusomunda =

Scientific classification
- Kingdom: Animalia
- Phylum: Mollusca
- Class: Gastropoda
- Order: Stylommatophora
- Family: Hygromiidae
- Genus: Ichnusomunda; Giusti & Manganelli 1998

Genus of gastropods

Ichnusomunda is a genus of air-breathing land snails, terrestrial pulmonate gastropod mollusks in the family Hygromiidae, the hairy snails and their allies.

== Species ==
Species within the genus Ichnusomunda include:

- Ichnusomunda sacchii
