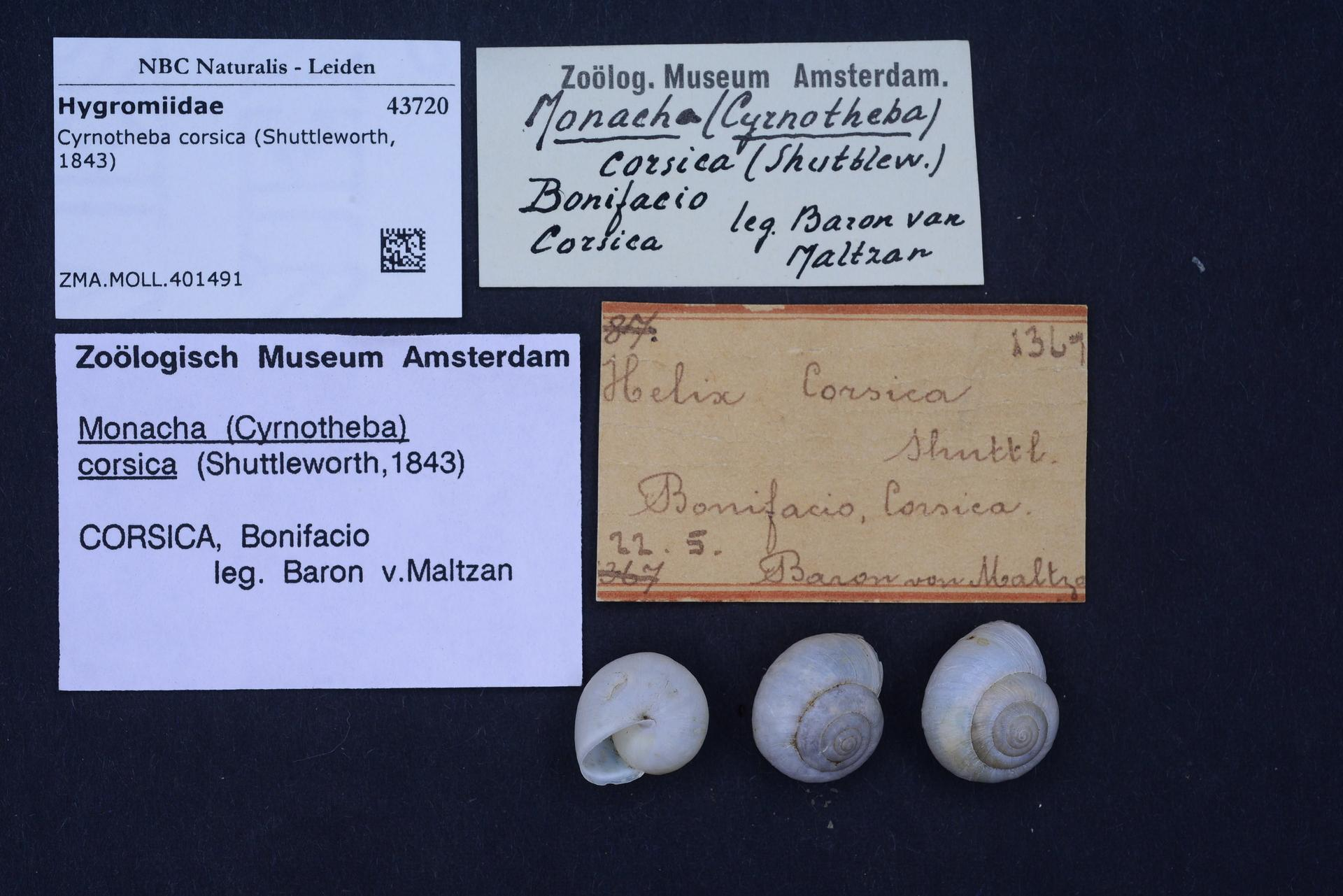

Conservation status
- Least Concern (IUCN 3.1)

Scientific classification
- Kingdom: Animalia
- Phylum: Mollusca
- Class: Gastropoda
- Order: Stylommatophora
- Family: Helicidae
- Genus: Cyrnotheba
- Species: C. corsica

Binomial name
- Cyrnotheba corsica (Shuttleworth, 1843)

= Cyrnotheba corsica =

Species of gastropod

Cyrnotheba corsica is a species of air-breathing, land snails, terrestrial pulmonate gastropod mollusks in the family Helicidae.

This species is endemic to France.
