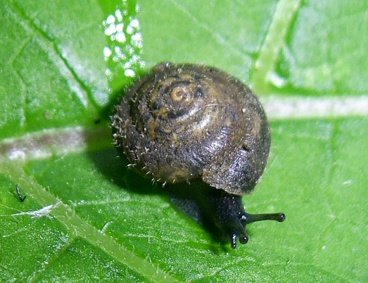

Conservation status
- Least Concern (IUCN 3.1)

Scientific classification
- Kingdom: Animalia
- Phylum: Mollusca
- Class: Gastropoda
- Order: Stylommatophora
- Family: Hygromiidae
- Genus: Pseudotrichia
- Species: P. rubiginosa

Binomial name
- Pseudotrichia rubiginosa (Rossmässler, 1838)

Synonyms
- Perforatella rubiginosa

= Pseudotrichia rubiginosa =

Species of gastropod

Pseudotrichia rubiginosa, sometimes known as the "German hairy snail", is a species of air-breathing land snail, a terrestrial pulmonate gastropod mollusk in the family Hygromiidae, the hairy snails and their allies.

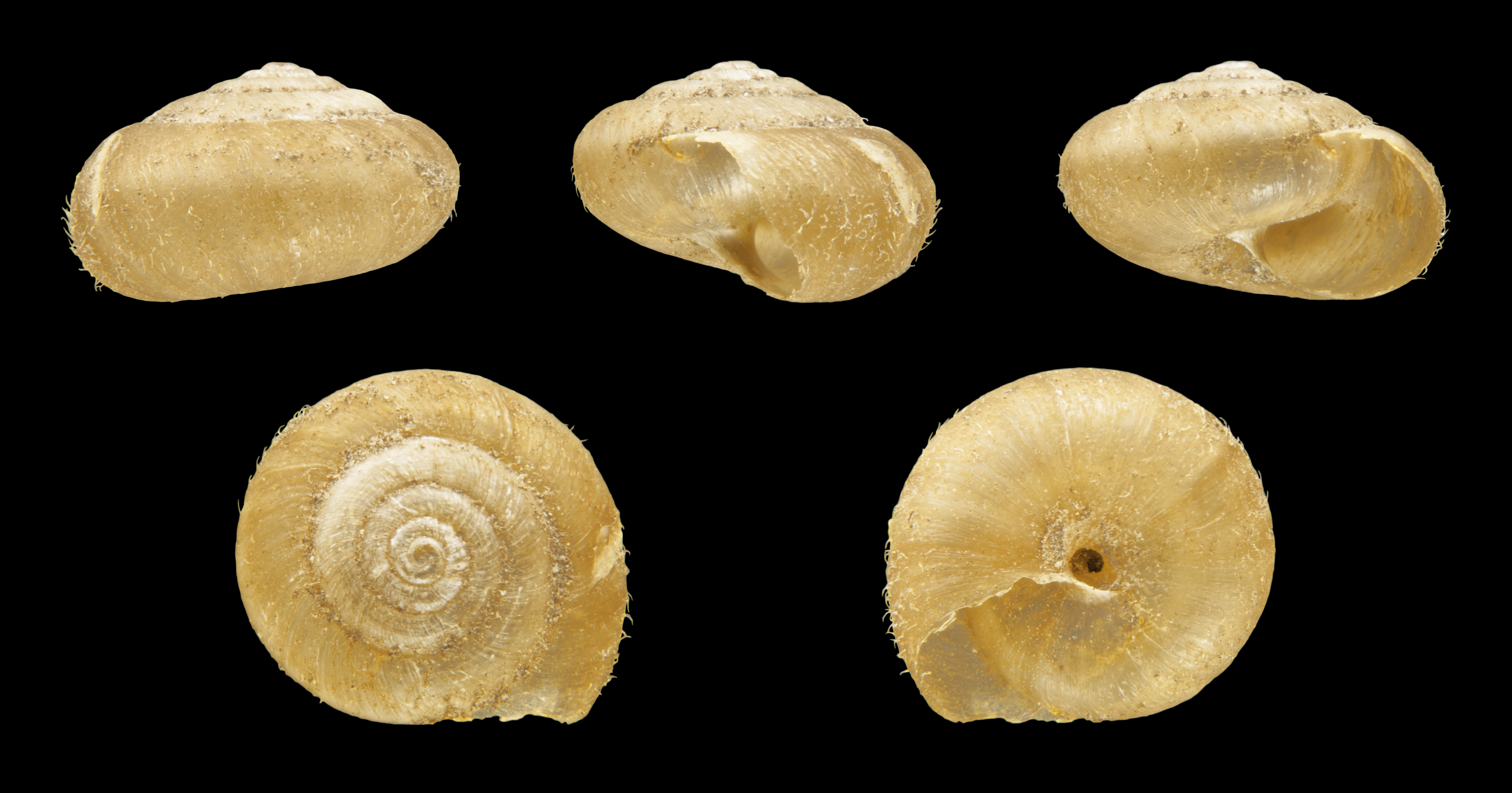

== Life cycle ==
This species of snail makes and uses love darts during mating.

The size of the egg is 1.6 mm.

== Distribution ==
The snail occurs in many areas throughout Europe:

- Great Britain - In England, it is found along the River Thames in London where it has a habitat at Isleworth Ait and along the River Lea, in east London, and Bow Back Rivers. It is also found in Oxfordshire and by the River Medway in Kent. Pseudotrichia rubiginosa is thought to have spread to Britain during the last ice age, when Britain was still connected to mainland Europe.
- Czech Republic
- Slovakia
- Poland
- Ukraine
- Netherlands
