= Lozekia =

Scientific classification
- Domain: Eukaryota
- Kingdom: Animalia
- Phylum: Mollusca
- Class: Gastropoda
- Order: Stylommatophora
- Family: Hygromiidae
- Subfamily: Hygromiinae
- Genus: Lozekia; Hudec, 1970

Genus of gastropods

Lozekia is a genus of land snails in the family Hygromiidae, the hairy snails and their allies.

== Species ==
Species include:

- Lozekia deubeli
- Lozekia transsilvanica
