= Ganula =

Scientific classification
- Kingdom: Animalia
- Phylum: Mollusca
- Class: Gastropoda
- Order: Stylommatophora
- Family: Hygromiidae
- Genus: Ganula; Gittenberger, 1970

Type species
- Helix lanuginosa Boissy

Genus of gastropods

Ganula is a genus of gastropods belonging to the family Hygromiidae.

The species of this genus are found in Mediterranean. The shells are usually small, yellowish, and opaque, with five or five-and-a-half whorls. Specifically, the genus is defined by a genital duct with a very short proximal vagina, and certain other features, such as microstructures on the shell.

== Species ==
=== Ganula gadirana Muñoz, Almodóvar & Arrébola, 1999 ===
G. gadirana was described from far southern Spain. Some specimens were recorded "intensively parasitized by small nematodes".

=== Ganula lanuginosa (Boissy, 1835) ===
The species has been recorded as a host of Angiostrongylus cantonensis, a parasitic nematode.
