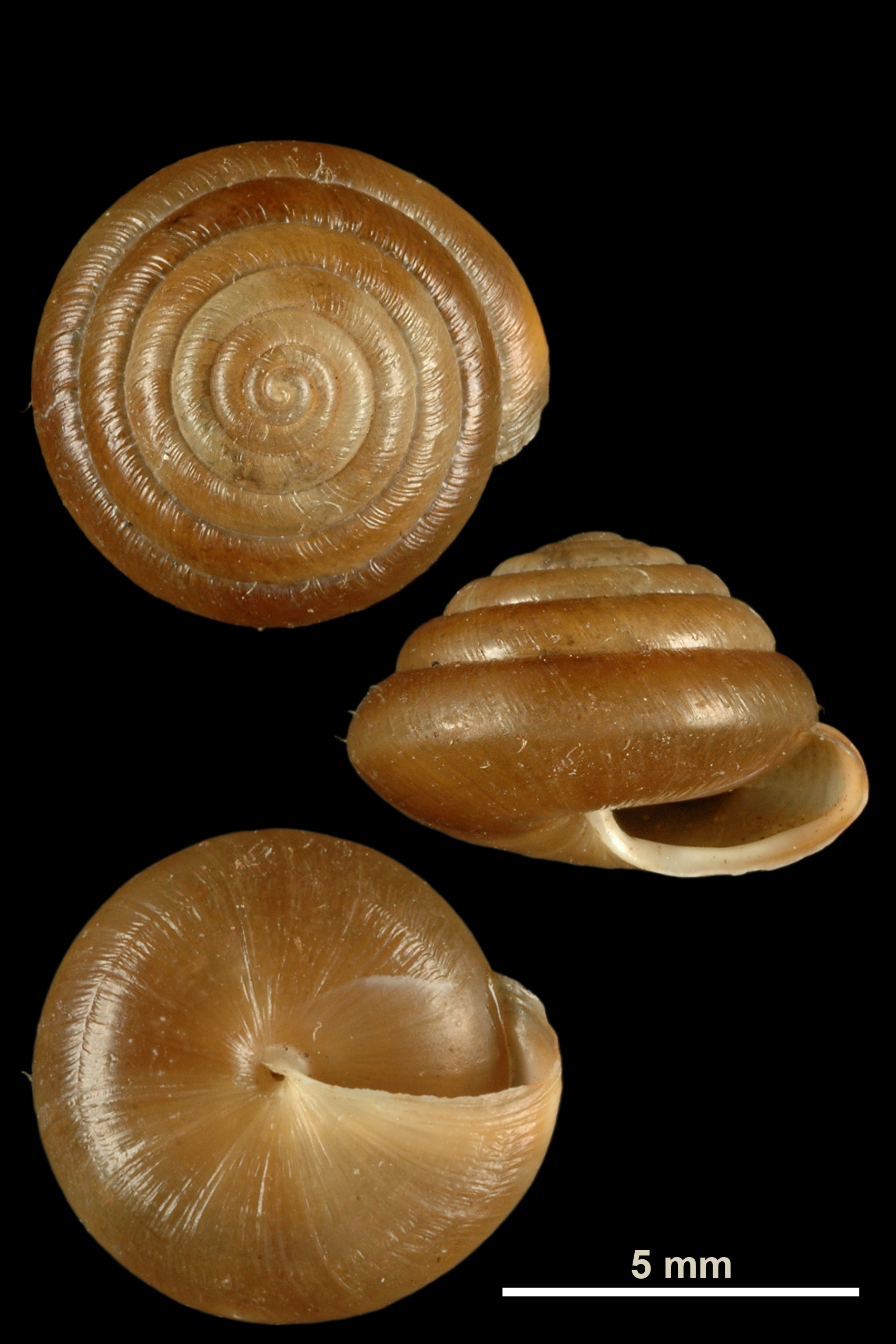
- Shell of Edentiella edentula (specimen at MNHN, Paris)

Scientific classification
- Domain: Eukaryota
- Kingdom: Animalia
- Phylum: Mollusca
- Class: Gastropoda
- Order: Stylommatophora
- Infraorder: Helicoidei
- Superfamily: Helicoidea
- Family: Hygromiidae
- Genus: Edentiella; Poliński, 1929

Synonyms
- Edentiella (Edentiella) Poliński, 1929· accepted, alternate representation; Edentiella (Filicinella) Poliński, 1929· accepted, alternate representation; Petasina (Edentiella) Poliński, 1929; Petasina (Filicinella) Poliński, 1929; Trichia (Edentiella) Poliński, 1929

= Edentiella =

Genus of gastropods

Edentiella is a genus of small air-breathing land snails, terrestrial pulmonate gastropod mollusks in the subfamily Trochulininae of the family Hygromiidae, the hairy snails and their allies.

== Species ==
- Edentiella bakowskii (Poliński, 1924)
- Edentiella bielzi (E. A. Bielz, 1859)
- Edentiella edentula (Draparnaud, 1805)
- Edentiella filicina (L. Pfeiffer, 1841)
- Edentiella leucozona (C. Pfeiffer, 1828)
- Edentiella lurida (C. Pfeiffer, 1828)
- Edentiella subtecta (Poliński, 1929)
