= Ichnusotricha =

Scientific classification
- Kingdom: Animalia
- Phylum: Mollusca
- Class: Gastropoda
- Order: Stylommatophora
- Family: Hygromiidae
- Genus: Ichnusotricha; Giusti & Manganelli, 1987
- Species: I. berninii

Binomial name
- Ichnusotricha berninii Giusti & Manganelli, 1987

Genus of land snails

Ichnusotricha is a monotypic genus of gastropods belonging to the family Hygromiidae. The only species is Ichnusotricha berninii.

The species is found in Corsica.
