= Prostenomphalia =

Scientific classification
- Domain: Eukaryota
- Kingdom: Animalia
- Phylum: Mollusca
- Class: Gastropoda
- Order: Stylommatophora
- Family: Hygromiidae
- Genus: Prostenomphalia; Baidashnikov, 1985
- Species: P. carpathica

Binomial name
- Prostenomphalia carpathica Baidashnikov, 1985

Genus of land snails

Prostenomphalia is a monotypic genus of gastropods belonging to the family Hygromiidae. The only species is Prostenomphalia carpathica.

The species inhabits terrestrial environments.
