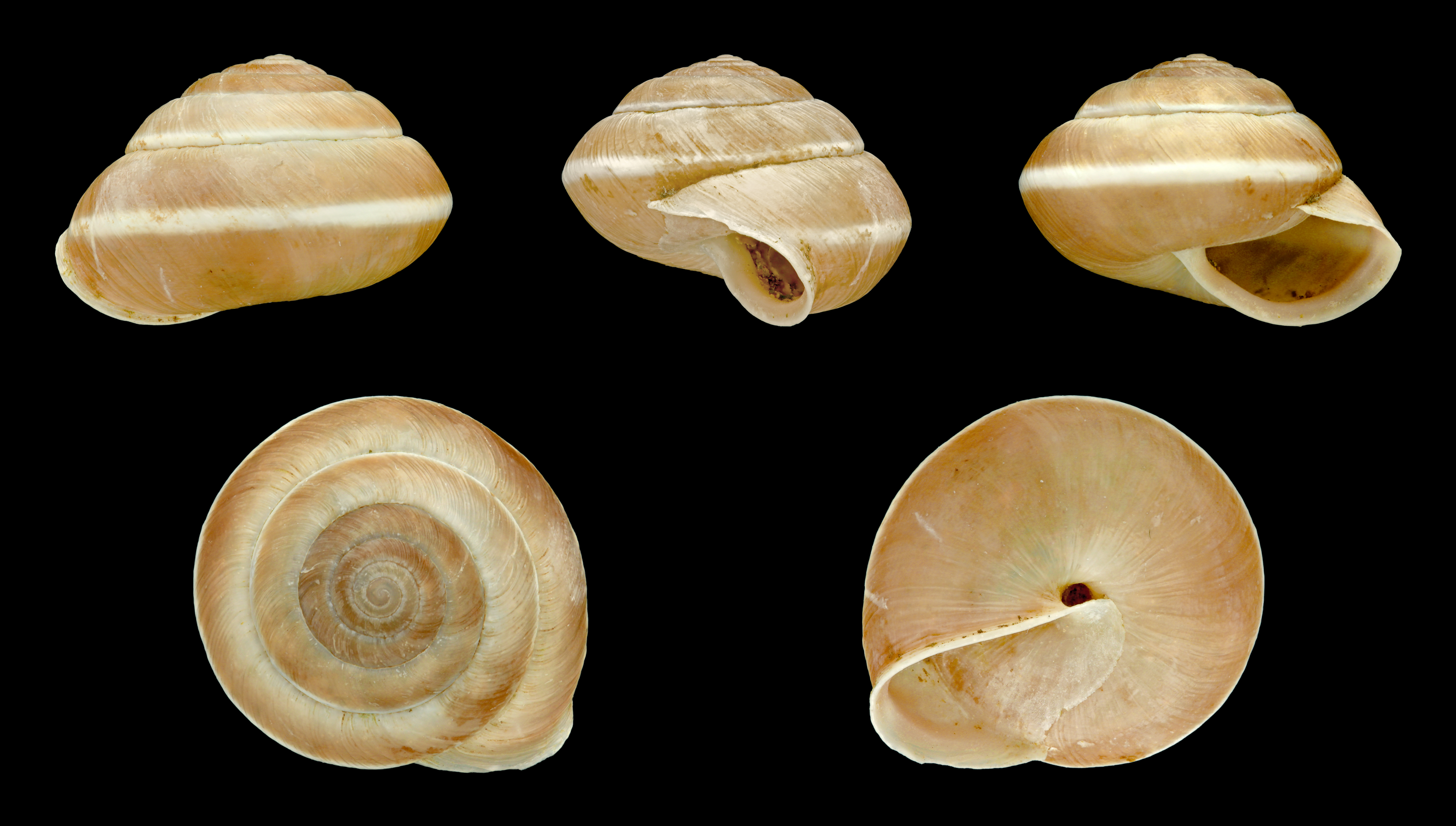

Scientific classification
- Kingdom: Animalia
- Phylum: Mollusca
- Class: Gastropoda
- Order: Stylommatophora
- Family: Hygromiidae
- Genus: Hygromia
- Species: H. limbata

Binomial name
- Hygromia limbata (Draparnaud, 1805)

Synonyms
- Helix limbata Draparnaud, 1805 (original combination); Hygromia (Riedelia) limbata (Draparnaud, 1805)· accepted, alternate representation

= Hygromia limbata =

Species of gastropod

Hygromia limbata is a species of small air-breathing land snail, a terrestrial pulmonate gastropod mollusc in the family Hygromiidae.

Subspecies

- Hygromia limbata limbata (Draparnaud, 1805)
- Hygromia limbata sublimbata (Bourguignat, 1882)

== Distribution ==
This species is known to occur in:

- Great Britain
- France
