= Helicotricha =

Scientific classification
- Kingdom: Animalia
- Phylum: Mollusca
- Class: Gastropoda
- Order: Stylommatophora
- Family: Hygromiidae
- Genus: Helicotricha; Giusti, Manganelli & Crisci, 1992
- Species: H. carusoi

Binomial name
- Helicotricha carusoi Giusti, Manganelli & Crisci, 1992

Genus of land snails

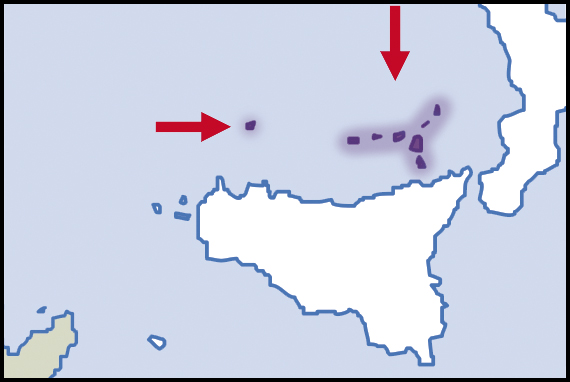
Native range in Europe

Helicotricha is a monotypic genus of gastropods belonging to the family, Hygromiidae. The only species is Helicotricha carusoi.

The species inhabits terrestrial environments.
