= Nienhuisiella =

Scientific classification
- Kingdom: Animalia
- Phylum: Mollusca
- Class: Gastropoda
- Order: Stylommatophora
- Family: Hygromiidae
- Genus: Nienhuisiella; Giusti & Manganelli, 1987
- Species: N. antonellae

Binomial name
- Nienhuisiella antonellae Giusti & Manganelli, 1987

Genus of land snails

Nienhuisiella is a monotypic genus of gastropods belonging to the family Hygromiidae. The only species is Nienhuisiella antonellae.

The species is found in Europe.
