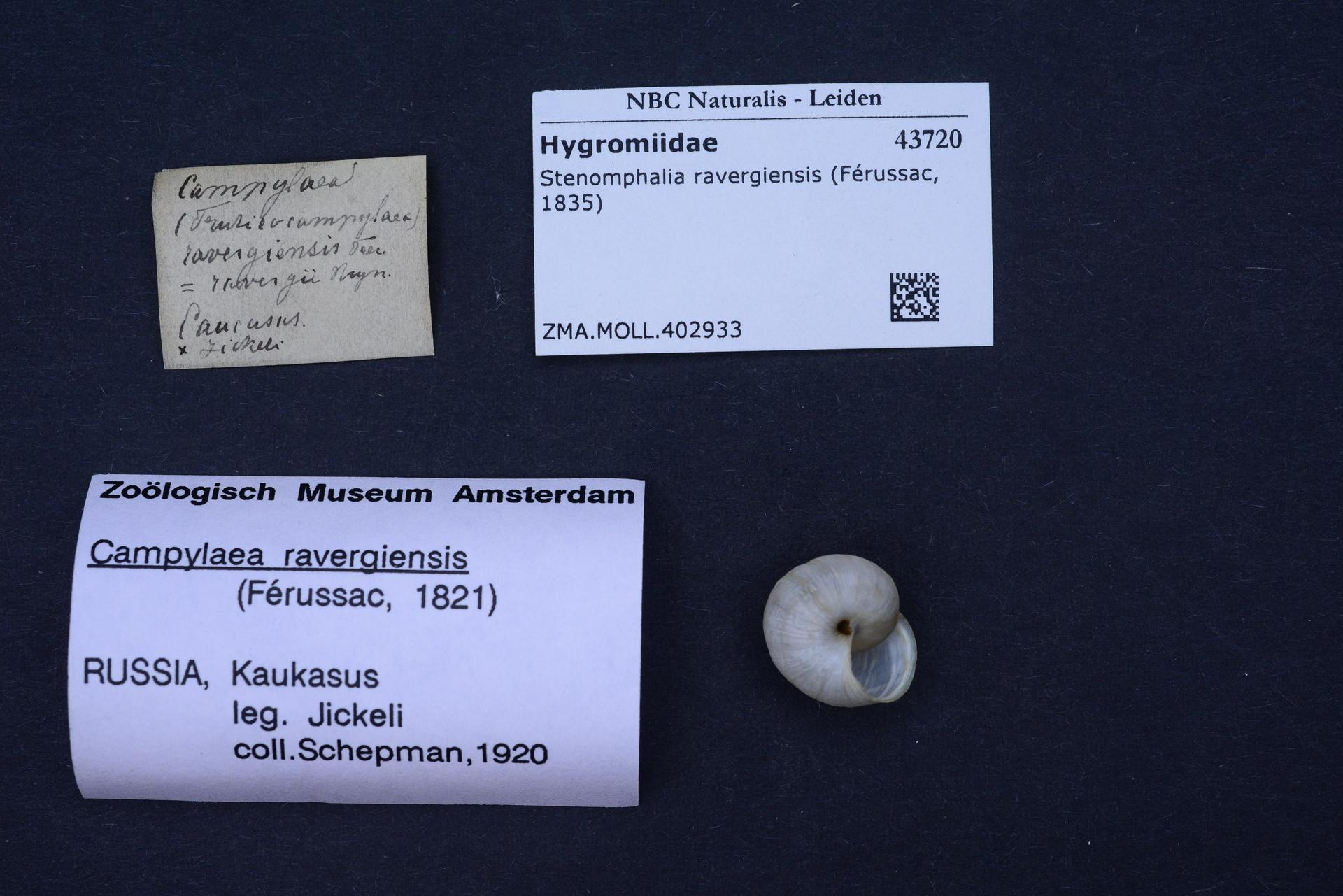
- Stenomphalia ravergiensis

Scientific classification
- Kingdom: Animalia
- Phylum: Mollusca
- Class: Gastropoda
- Order: Stylommatophora
- Family: Hygromiidae
- Tribe: Monachaini
- Genus: Stenomphalia; Lindholm, 1927

= Stenomphalia =

Genus of land snails

Stenomphalia is a genus of gastropods belonging to the family Hygromiidae.

The species of this genus are found in Central Asia.

Species:

- Stenomphalia selecta (Klika, 1894)
- Stenomphalia turcica (Schütt, 1985)
