= Ciliella (gastropod) =

Scientific classification
- Kingdom: Animalia
- Phylum: Mollusca
- Class: Gastropoda
- Order: Stylommatophora
- Family: Hygromiidae
- Genus: Ciliella; Mousson, 1872

Genus of land snails

Ciliella is a genus of gastropods belonging to the family Hygromiidae.

The species of this genus are found in Southern Europe.

Species:

- Ciliella beccarii (Jickeli, 1874)
- Ciliella ciliata (W.Hartmann, 1821)
