= Zenobiellina =

Scientific classification
- Kingdom: Animalia
- Phylum: Mollusca
- Class: Gastropoda
- Order: Stylommatophora
- Family: Hygromiidae
- Genus: Zenobiellina [Holyoak, D. T. & Holyoak, G. A., 2018

Synonyms
- Perforatella (Zenobiella) Gude & B. B. Woodward, 1921; Zenobiella Gude & B. B. Woodward, 1921 (junior synonym)

Genus of gastropods

Zenobiellina is a genus of air-breathing land snails, terrestrial pulmonate gastropod mollusks in the subfamily Hygromiinae of the family Hygromiidae, the hairy snails and their allies.

Species in this genus of snail create and use love darts as part of their mating behavior.

== Species ==
Species within the genus Zenobiellina include:

- Zenobiellina graminicola Holyoak, D. T. & Holyoak, G. A., 2018
- Zenobiellina subrufescens (J. S. Miller, 1822)
