= Kovacsia =

Scientific classification
- Kingdom: Animalia
- Phylum: Mollusca
- Class: Gastropoda
- Order: Stylommatophora
- Infraorder: Helicoidei
- Superfamily: Helicoidea
- Family: Hygromiidae
- Genus: Kovacsia; H. Nordsieck, 1993

Type species
- Hygromia kovacsi Varga & L. Pintér, 1972

Genus of gastropods

Kovacsia is a genus of air-breathing land snails, terrestrial pulmonate gastropod mollusks in the family Hygromiidae, the hairy snails and their allies.

== Species ==
Species within the genus Kovacsia include:

- Kovacsia kovacsi (Varga & L. Pintér, 1972)
