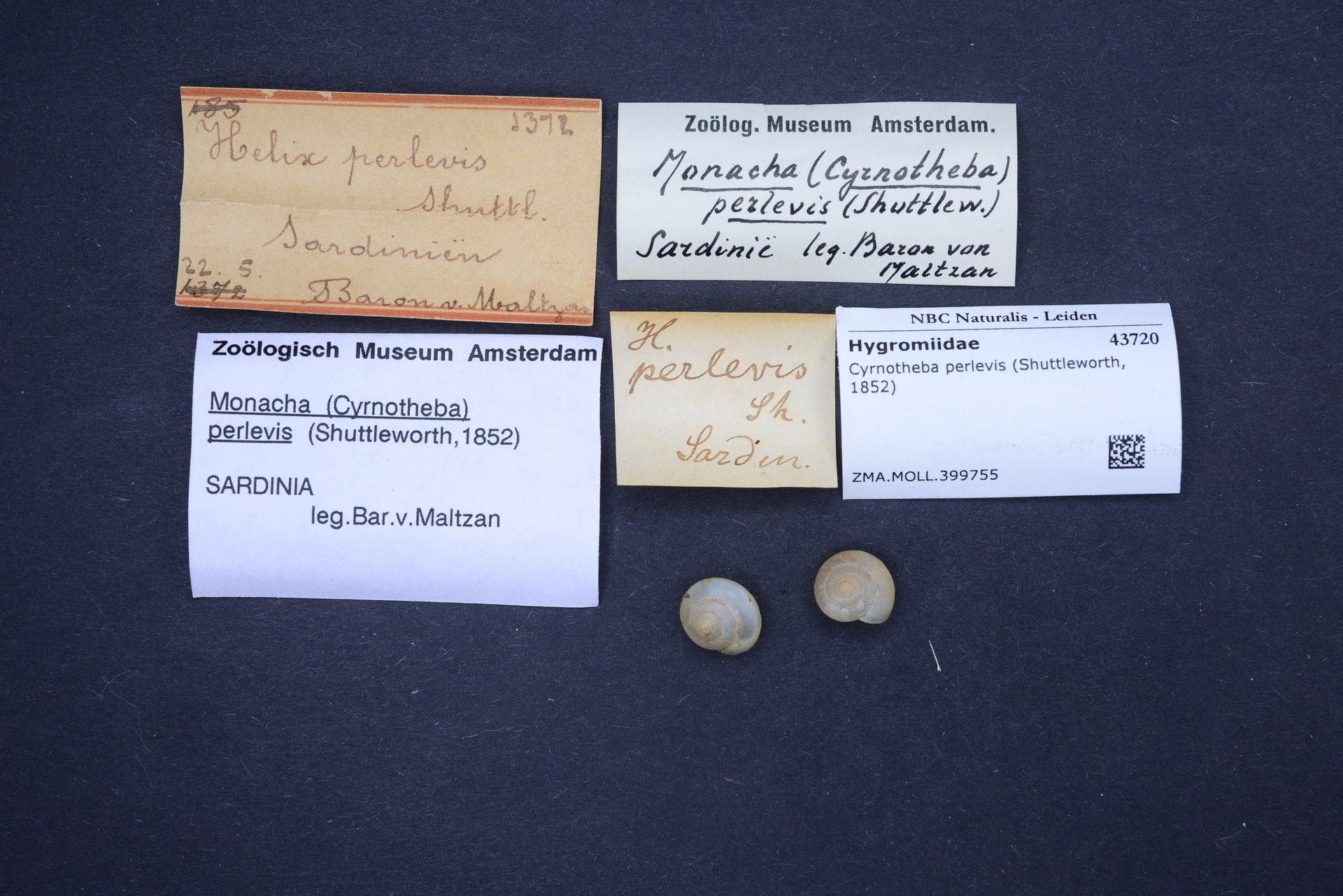

Scientific classification
- Kingdom: Animalia
- Phylum: Mollusca
- Class: Gastropoda
- Order: Stylommatophora
- Family: Helicidae
- Genus: Cyrnotheba; Germain, 1929

= Cyrnotheba =

Genus of gastropods

Cyrnotheba is a genus of air-breathing land snails, terrestrial pulmonate gastropod mollusks in the family Helicidae.

== Species ==
Species within the genus Cyrnotheba include:

- Cyrnotheba corsica
