= Florence Taylor Hildred =

British astronomer

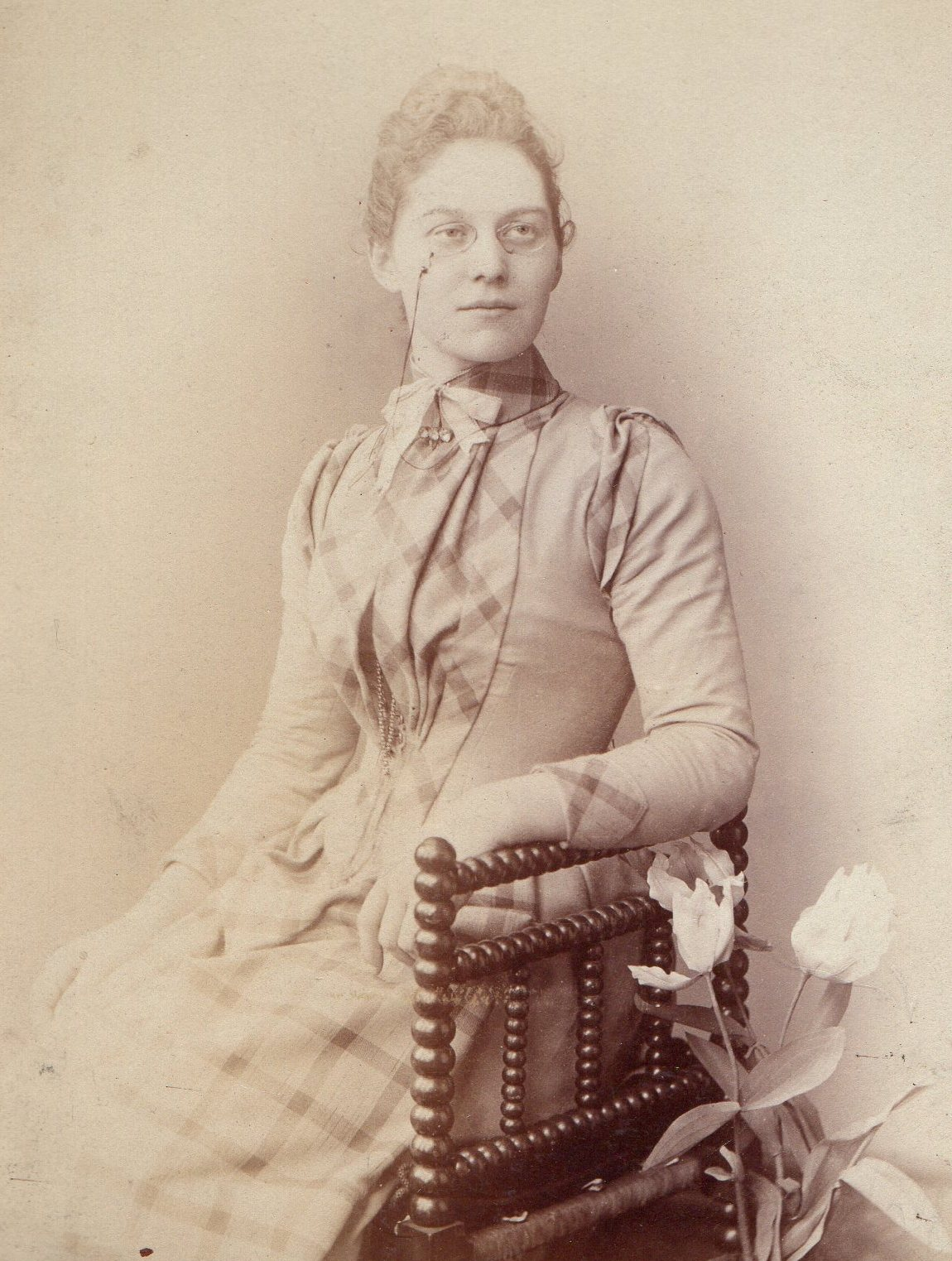
A studio photograph, taken in Leeds (c. 1898), of Florence Taylor – later Florence Taylor Hildred. From the archives of Leeds Astronomical Society

Florence Taylor Hildred (1865–1932) was the first female member of Leeds Astronomical Society and later a pastor for the Unity Society of Practical Christianity in Sacramento, US, where she was the first woman in the city to conduct a marriage ceremony.

== Early life ==
Florence was born in Leeds in November 1865, she was the daughter of Charles Henry Taylor, a wealthy iron foundry owner. She may have trained as a school teacher.

== Astronomy career ==
Florence joined the Leeds Astronomical Society in 1895. The Society had reformed in 1892 and actively sought to recruit women. Several of the leading members were supporters of women's rights. Florence wrote and delivered lectures and prepared papers for publication. She had research interests in women's astronomical history and also women's suffrage. She delivered two lectures on 23 September 1896 and on 28 July 1897. In 1896, she lectured on Caroline Herschel, publishing it in the Society's Transactions. In 1897, she lectured on Mary Somerville. Her lecture was entitled 'Mary Somerville, the great Woman Astronomer and Mathematician' and was also published in the Society's Transactions. Florence saw Somerville's work as inspiration and direction for contemporary women who were able to benefit from increasing higher education for women that had not been available to Somerville in the 18th century. President of the Society, Washington Teasdale, commented after her lecture on the work of several women astronomers and the intellectual equality of women with men.

Florence married the Yorkshire born farmer, Charles Hildred in Leeds on 2 February 1898. In June 1898, the couple moved to Wilmont, Nobles County, Minnesota and later moved to Sacramento, California. In a letter written on her departure, Florence thanked the Society for a gift of a book and expressed her wish to remain a member of the Society.

Florence kept her ties to the Leeds Astronomical Society. In 1904, she wrote to the Society inquiring about whether they had established a public observatory, and offered to contribute £100 to start the work. The Society used the money to help found the Cecil Duncombe Observatory on Woodhouse Moor (now demolished). In 1909, she was made an Honorary member. She remained a member of the Society until at least 1921.

== Legacy ==
Florence died in Sacramento on September 6, 1932, at the age of 66.

She was featured in the exhibition, Leeds to Innovation (26 October 2019 – 26 September 2020), at Leeds Industrial Museum at Armley Mills.
