= Hiltrudia =

Scientific classification
- Kingdom: Animalia
- Phylum: Mollusca
- Class: Gastropoda
- Order: Stylommatophora
- Family: Hygromiidae
- Genus: Hiltrudia; Nordsieck, 1993

Genus of land snails

Hiltrudia is a genus of gastropods belonging to the family Hygromiidae.

The species of this genus are found near Adriatic Sea.

Species:

- Hiltrudia globulosa Subai, 2009
- Hiltrudia kusmici (Clessin, 1887)
- Hiltrudia mathildae (Westerlund, 1881)
