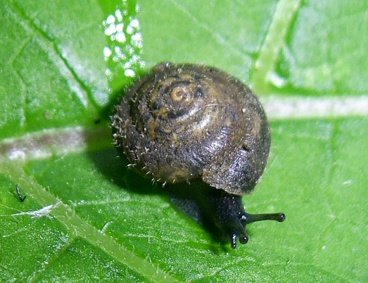
- Pseudotrichia rubiginosa

Scientific classification
- Kingdom: Animalia
- Phylum: Mollusca
- Class: Gastropoda
- Order: Stylommatophora
- Family: Hygromiidae
- Genus: Pseudotrichia; Likharev, 1949

= Pseudotrichia (gastropod) =

Genus of gastropods

Pseudotrichia is a genus of air-breathing land snails, terrestrial pulmonate gastropod mollusks in the family Hygromiidae, the hairy snails and their allies.

Snails of this genus are native to Europe.

Species in this genus of snail create and use love darts as part of their mating behavior.

== Species ==
Species within the genus Pseudotrichia include:

- Pseudotrichia memnonis (Sturany, 1904)
- Pseudotrichia rubiginosa (Rossmässler, 1838)
