= Ciliella epidendri =

Scientific classification
- Kingdom: Fungi
- Division: Ascomycota
- Class: Leotiomycetes
- Order: Helotiales
- Family: incertae sedis
- Genus: Ciliella; Sacc. & P. Syd.
- Species: C. epidendri

Binomial name
- Ciliella epidendri (Rehm) Sacc. & P. Syd.

Genus of fungi

Ciliella is a genus of fungi in the order Helotiales. The relationship of this taxon to other taxa within the order is unknown (incertae sedis), and it has not yet been placed with certainty into any family. This is a monotypic genus, containing the single species Ciliella epidendri.
