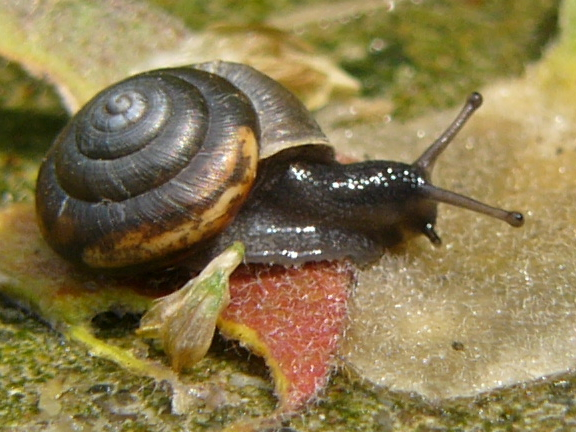
- A live individual of Trochulus hispidus

Scientific classification
- Kingdom: Animalia
- Phylum: Mollusca
- Class: Gastropoda
- Order: Stylommatophora
- Suborder: Helicina
- Infraorder: Helicoidei
- Superfamily: Helicoidea
- Family: Hygromiidae; Tryon, 1866

Type genus
- Hygromia Risso, 1826

Genera
- See text

Synonyms
- Helicellidae Ihering, 1909

= Hygromiidae =

Family of gastropods

Hygromiidae is a taxonomic family of small to medium-sized air-breathing land snails, terrestrial pulmonate gastropod mollusks in the superfamily Helicoidea.

== Anatomy ==
Some snails in genera within this family create and use love darts as part of their courtship and mating behavior.

In this family, the number of haploid chromosomes lies between 26 and 30 (according to the values in this table).

== Taxonomy ==
The family Hygromiidae consists of the following subfamilies (according to the taxonomy of the Gastropoda by Bouchet & Rocroi, 2005):

- subfamily Hygromiinae Tryon, 1866
  - tribe Hygromiini Tryon, 1866 - synonym: Cernuellini Schileyko, 1991
- subfamily Leptaxinae C.R. Boettger, 1909
  - tribe Leptaxini C.R. Boettger, 1909
- subfamily Metafruticicolinae Schileyko, 1972
- subfamily Ponentininae Schileyko, 1991
- subfamily Trochulinae Lindholm, 1927
  - tribe Archaicini Schileyko, 1978
  - tribe Ciliellini Schileyko, 1970
  - tribe Halolimnohelicini H. Nordsieck, 1986
  - tribe Monachaini Wenz, 1930 (1904)
  - tribe Trochulini Lindholm, 1927

=== Genera ===
Genera with the family Hygromiidae include:

The type genus of this family is Hygromia Risso, 1826.

Not belonging to a subfamily

- † Archygromia Pfeffer, 1930
- † Camaenopsis Dollfus & Dautzenberg, 1924
- Cernuellopsis Manganelli & Giusti, 1988
- Helicotricha Giusti, Manganelli & Crisci, 1992
- † Hemistenotrema O. Boettger, 1897
- † Hochheimia Harzhauser & Neubauer, 2021
- Ichnusomunda Giusti & Manganelli, 1998
- Kalitinaia Hudec & Lezhawa, 1967
- † Leucochroopsis O. Boettger, 1908
- † Loganiopharynx Wenz, 1919
- † Pseudomonacha Pfeffer, 1930
- † Pseudoxerotricha C. R. Boettger, 1911

subfamily Hygromiinae Tryon, 1866

- tribe Hygromiini Tryon, 1866
  - Hygromia Risso, 1826
  - Zenobiellina Holyoak, D. T. & Holyoak, G. A., 2018
- tribe Perforatellini Neiber, Razkin & Hausdorf, 2017
  - Chilanodon Westerlund, 1897
  - Kovacsia H. Nordsieck, 1993
  - Lindholmomneme F. Haas, 1936
  - Lozekia Hudec, 1970
  - Monachoides Gude & B. B. Woodward, 1921
  - Noneulota Schileyko & Horsák, 2007
  - Perforatella Schlüter, 1838
  - Pseudotrichia Schileyko, 1970
  - Stygius Schileyko, 1970
- tribe incerta

subfamily Leptaxinae C.R. Boettger, 1909

- Tribe Cryptosaccini Neiber, Razkin & Hausdorf, 2017
  - Cryptosaccus Prieto & Puente, 1994
  - Fractanella Caro & Madeira, 2019
  - Mengoana Ortiz de Zárate López, 1951
  - Pyrenaearia P. Hesse, 1921
- Tribe Leptaxini C.R. Boettger, 1909
  - Leptaxis R. T. Lowe, 1852
  - Portugala E. Gittenberger, 1980

subfamily Metafruticicolinae Schileyko, 1972

  - Cyrnotheba Germain, 1928
  - Elbasania Schileyko & Fehér, 2017
  - Hiltrudia H. Nordsieck, 1993
  - Metafruticicola Ihering, 1892

subfamily Trochulinae Lindholm, 1927

- Tribe Archaicini Schileyko, 1978
  - Angiomphalia Schileyko, 1978
  - Archaica Schileyko, 1970
  - Coronarchaica Neiber, Razkin & Hausdorf, 2017
  - Leucozonella Lindholm, 1927
  - Odontotrema Lindholm, 1927
  - Paedhoplita Lindholm, 1927
- Tribe Ashfordiini Neiber, Razkin & Hausdorf, 2017
  - Ashfordia J. W. Taylor, 1917
- tribe Caucasigenini Neiber, Razkin & Hausdorf, 2017
  - Anoplitella Lindholm, 1929
  - Caucasigena Lindholm, 1927
  - Circassina P. Hesse, 1921
  - Diodontella Lindholm, 1929
  - Dioscuria Lindholm, 1927
  - Fruticocampylaea Kobelt, 1871
  - Hygrohelicopsis Schileyko, 1978
  - Lazicana Neiber, Walther & Hausdorf, 2018
  - Teberdinia Schileyko, 1978
- Tribe Ciliellini Schileyko, 1970
  - Ciliella Mousson, 1872
  - Ciliellopsis Giusti & Manganelli, 1990
- tribe Ganulini Neiber, Razkin & Hausdorf, 2017
  - Ganula E. Gittenberger, 1970
  - Ichnusotricha Giusti & Manganelli, 1987
  - Nienhuisiella Giusti & Manganelli, 1987
- tribe Halolimnohelicini H. Nordsieck, 1986
  - Elgonella Preston, 1914
  - Halolimnohelix Germain, 1913
  - Haplohelix Pilsbry, 1919
  - Vicariihelix Pilsbry, 1919
- tribe Monachaini Wenz, 1930 (1904)
  - Abchasohela Hudec & Lezhawa, 1971
  - Batumica Schileyko, 1978
  - Caucasocressa P. Hesse, 1921
  - Diplobursa Schileyko, 1968
  - Euomphalia Westerlund, 1889
  - Harmozica Lindholm, 1927
  - Hesseola Lindholm, 1927
  - Jasonella Lindholm, 1927
  - Karabaghia Lindholm, 1927
  - Lejeania Ancey, 1887
  - Monacha Fitzinger, 1833 - type genus of the subfamily Monachainae
  - Oscarboettgeria Lindholm, 1927
  - Platytheba Pilsbry, 1895: synonym of Monacha Fitzinger, 1833 (junior synonym)
  - Prostenomphalia Baidashnikov, 1985
  - Pseudhesseola H. Nordsieck, 1993
  - Stenomphalia Lindholm, 1927
- tribe Trochulini Lindholm, 1927
  - Edentiella Poliński, 1929
  - Noricella Neiber, Razkin & Hausdorf, 2017
  - Petasina H. Beck, 1847
  - Raeticella Kneubühler, Baggenstos & Neubert, 2022
  - Trochulus Chemnitz, 1786 - synonym: Trichia
- Tribe Urticicolini Neiber, Razkin & Hausdorf, 2017
  - Plicuteria Schileyko, 1978
  - Semifruticicola A. J. Wagner, 1914
  - Urticicola Lindholm, 1927
  - Xerocampylaea Kobelt, 1871

== Synonyms ==
- Kokotschashvilia Hudec & Lezhawa, 1969: synonym of Dioscuria Lindholm, 1927
- Shileykoia Hudec, 1969: synonym of Fruticocampylaea Kobelt, 1871
- Tyrrheniella: synonym of Tyrrheniellina Giusti & Manganelli, 1992
- Zenobiella Gude & Woodward, 1921 - with the only species Zenobiella subrufescens (Miller, 1822): synonym of Zenobiellina Holyoak, D. T. & Holyoak, G. A., 2018 (junior synonym)
