= List of non-marine molluscs of Germany =

Location of Germany

This list of non-marine molluscs of Germany is a list of the molluscs that live in Germany, excluding the marine (saltwater) species. In other words, it includes the land snails and slugs, the freshwater snails and the freshwater clams and mussels.

There are about 349 species of non-marine mollusc living in the wild in Germany. Of these, 70 species are freshwater gastropods and 39 species are bivalves. There are 45 introduced gastropod species (6 freshwater and 36 land species) and 3 introduced bivalve species living in the wild in Germany.

Summary table of number of species

	Germany
freshwater gastropods	70
land gastropods	240
gastropods altogether	310
bivalves	39
molluscs altogether	349
non-indigenous gastropods in the wild	6 freshwater and 36 land
non-indigenous bivalves in the wild	3
non-indigenous molluscs altogether in the wild	45

Some non-indigenous species only occurring greenhouses in Germany are noted separately, below the list.

The main source for the list of freshwater species is the book Süsswassermollusken by Glöer & Meier-Brook.

== Freshwater gastropods ==
Neritidae

- Theodoxus danubialis (C. Pfeiffer, 1828)
- Theodoxus fluviatilis (Linnaeus, 1758) – and Theodoxus fluviatilis littoralis (Linnaeus, 1758)
- Theodoxus transversalis (C. Pfeiffer, 1828)

Viviparidae

- Viviparus ater (Christofori & Jan, 1832)
- Viviparus acerosus (Bourguignat, 1862)
- Viviparus contectus (Millet, 1813)
- Viviparus viviparus (Linnaeus, 1758) – and Viviparus viviparus penthicus (Servain, 1884)

Hydrobiidae

- Potamopyrgus antipodarum (Gray, 1843) – non-indigenous
- Bythiospeum acicula (Held, 1838)
- Bythiospeum quenstedti (von Wiedersheim, 1873)
- Bythiospeum sandbergeri (Flach, 1886)
- Sadleriana bavarica Boeters, 1989
- Avenionia roberti Boeters, 1967

Lithoglyphidae

- Lithoglyphus naticoides (C. Pfeiffer, 1828)

Amnicolidae

- Marstoniopsis scholtzi (A. Schmidt, 1856)
- Bythinella austriaca (von Frauenfeld, 1857)
- Bythinella badensis (Boeters, 1981)
- Bythinella bavarica (Clessin, 1877)
- Bythinella compressa (von Frauenfeld, 1857)
- Bythinella dunkeri (von Frauenfeld, 1857)
- Emmericia patula (Brumati, 1838)

Bithyniidae

- Bithynia leachii (Sheppard, 1823)
- Bithynia tentaculata (Linnaeus, 1758)
- Bithynia troschelii (Paasch, 1842)

Valvatidae

- Borysthenia naticina (Menke, 1845)
- Valvata ambigua Westerlund, 1873
- Valvata cristata O.F. Müller, 1774
- Valvata macrostoma Mörch, 1864
- Valvata piscinalis (O.F. Müller, 1774)
- Valvata studeri Boeters & Falkner, 1998

Acroloxidae

- Acroloxus lacustris (Linnaeus, 1758)

Lymnaeidae

- Galba truncatula (O.F. Müller, 1774)
- Stagnicola occultus (Jackiewicz, 1959) – synonym: Catascopia occulta (Jackiewicz, 1959)
- Stagnicola corvus (Gmelin, 1791)
- Stagnicola fuscus (C. Pfeiffer, 1821)
- Stagnicola palustris (O.F. Müller, 1774)
- Stagnicola turricula (Held, 1836)
- Omphiscola glabra (O.F. Müller, 1774)
- Radix ampla (Hartmann, 1821)
- Radix auricularia (Linnaeus, 1758)
- Radix balthica (Linnaeus, 1758) – synonym: Radix ovata (Draparnaud, 1805)
- Radix peregra (O.F. Müller, 1774) – synonym:: Radix labiata (Rossmässler, 1835)
- Myxas glutinosa (O.F. Müller, 1774)
- Lymnaea stagnalis (Linnaeus, 1758)

Physidae

- Aplexa hypnorum (Linnaeus, 1758)
- Physa fontinalis (Linnaeus, 1758)
- Physella acuta (Draparnaud, 1805) – non-indigenous, synonym: Physella heterostropha (Say, 1817)

Planorbidae

- Planorbis carinatus O.F. Müller, 1774
- Planorbis planorbis (Linnaeus, 1758)
- Anisus calculiformis (Sandberger, 1874)
- Anisus leucostoma (Millet, 1813)
- Anisus spirorbis (Linnaeus, 1758)
- Anisus vortex (Linnaeus, 1758)
- Anisus vorticulus (Troschel, 1834)
- Bathyomphalus contortus (Linnaeus, 1758)
- Gyraulus acronicus (A. Férussac, 1807)
- Gyraulus albus (O.F. Müller, 1774)
- Gyraulus crista (Linnaeus, 1758)
- Gyraulus chinensis (Dunker, 1848) – non-indigenous, in Magdeburg lowland(?)
- Gyraulus laevis (Alder, 1838)
- Gyraulus parvus (Say, 1817) – non-indigenous
- Gyraulus riparius (Westerlund, 1865)
- Gyraulus rossmaessleri (Auerswald, 1852)
- Hippeutis complanatus (Linnaeus, 1758)
- Segmentina nitida (O.F. Müller, 1774)
- Planorbarius corneus (Linnaeus, 1758)
- Planorbella duryi (Wetherby, 1879) – non-indigenous, one appearance in Rhineland
- Menetus dilatatus (Gould, 1841) – non-indigenous
- Ancylus fluviatilis O.F. Müller, 1774
- Ferrissia fragilis (Tryon, 1863) – non-indigenous

== Land gastropods ==
Aciculidae

- Acicula fusca (Montagu, 1803)
- Acicula lineata (Draparnaud, 1801)
- Acicula lineolata (Pini, 1884)
- Platyla gracilis (Clessin, 1877)
- Platyla polita (W. Hartmann, 1840)
- Renea veneta (Pirona, 1865)

Cochlostomatidae

- Cochlostoma septemspirale (Razoumowsky, 1789)

Pomatiidae

- Pomatias elegans (O.F. Müller, 1774)

Assimineidae

- Assiminea grayana Fleming, 1828

Ellobiidae

- Myosotella myosotis (Draparnaud, 1801)
- Leucophytia bidentata (Montagu, 1808)

Carychiidae

- Carychium minimum O.F. Müller, 1774
- Carychium tridentatum (Risso, 1826)

Succineidae

- Oxyloma elegans (Risso, 1826)
- Oxyloma sarsii (Esmark, 1886)
- Quickella arenaria (Potiez & Michaud, 1835)
- Succinea putris Linnaeus, 1758
- Succinella oblonga (Draparnaud, 1801)

Azecidae

- Azeca goodalli (Férussac, 1821)

Cochlicopidae

- Cochlicopa lubrica (O.F. Müller, 1774)
- Cochlicopa lubricella (Rossmässler, 1834)
- Cochlicopa nitens (M. von Gallenstein, 1848)

Chondrinidae

- Abida secale (Draparnaud, 1801)
- Chondrina arcadica (Reinhardt, 1881)
- Chondrina avenacea (Bruguière, 1792)
- Granaria frumentum (Draparnaud, 1801)

Lauriidae

- Lauria cylindracea (da Costa, 1778)

Orculidae

- Orcula dolium (Draparnaud, 1801)
- Orcula gularis (Rossmässler, 1837)
- Pagodulina pagodula (Desmoulins, 1830)
- Sphyradium doliolum (Bruguière, 1792)

Pupillidae

- Pupilla alpicola (Charpentier, 1837) – synonym: Pupilla pratensis (Clessin, 1871)
- Pupilla muscorum (Linnaeus, 1758)
- Pupilla sterrii (Voith, 1840)
- Pupilla triplicata (Studer, 1820)

Pyramidulidae

- Pyramidula pusilla (Vallot, 1801)
- Pyramidula saxatilis (Hartmann, 1842)

Truncatellinidae

- Columella aspera Waldén, 1966
- Columella columella (G.v. Martens, 1830)
- Columella edentula (Draparnaud, 1805)
- Truncatellina algoviana Colling & Karle-Fendt, 2016
- Truncatellina callicratis (Scacchi, 1833)
- Truncatellina claustralis (Gredler, 1856)
- Truncatellina costulata (Nilsson, 1823)
- Truncatellina cylindrica (A. Férussac, 1807)
- Truncatellina monodon (Held, 1837)

Valloniidae

- Acanthinula aculeata (O.F. Müller, 1774)
- Spermodea lamellata Jeffreys, 1830
- Vallonia costata (O.F. Müller, 1774)
- Vallonia declivis Sterki, 1893
- Vallonia enniensis (Gredler, 1856)
- Vallonia excentrica Sterki 1893
- Vallonia pulchella (O.F. Müller, 1774)
- Vallonia suevica Geyer 1908

Vertiginidae

- Vertigo alpestris Alder, 1838
- Vertigo angustior Jeffreys, 1830
- Vertigo antivertigo (Draparnaud, 1801)
- Vertigo genesii (Gredler, 1856) – extinct
- Vertigo geyeri Lindholm, 1925
- Vertigo heldi (Clessin, 1870)
- Vertigo lilljeborgi (Westerlund, 1871)
- Vertigo modesta (Say, 1824)
- Vertigo moulinsiana (Dupuy, 1849)
- Vertigo pusilla O.F. Müller, 1774
- Vertigo pygmaea (Draparnaud, 1801)
- Vertigo ronnebyensis (Westerlund, 1871)
- Vertigo substriata (Jeffreys, 1833)

Enidae

- Ena montana (Draparnaud, 1801)
- Chondrula tridens (O.F. Müller, 1774)
- Jaminia quadridens (O.F. Müller, 1774)
- Merdigera obscura (O.F. Müller, 1774)
- Zebrina detrita (O.F. Müller, 1774)
- Zebrina varnensis (L. Pfeiffer, 1847) – non-indigenous

Clausiliidae

- Alinda biplicata (Montagu, 1805)
- Alopia stramonicollis monacha (M. von Kimakowicz, 1894) – non-indigenous
- Balea perversa (Linnaeus, 1758)
- Bulgarica cana (Held, 1836)
- Bulgarica vetusta (Rossmässler, 1836)
- Charpentieria itala (G. von Martens, 1824) – non-indigenous
- Clausilia bidentata (Strøm, 1765)
- Clausilia cruciata (Studer, 1820)
- Clausilia dubia Draparnaud, 1805
- Clausilia pumila Pfeiffer, 1828
- Clausilia rugosa parvula A. Férussac, 1807
- Cochlodina costata (Pfeiffer, 1828)
- Cochlodina fimbriata (Rossmässler, 1835)
- Cochlodina laminata (Montagu, 1803)
- Cochlodina orthostoma (Menke, 1828)
- Erjavecia bergeri (Rossmässler, 1836)
- Laciniaria plicata (Draparnaud, 1801)
- Macrogastra attenuata lineolata (Held, 1836)
- Macrogastra badia (Pfeiffer, 1828)
- Macrogastra densestriata (Rossmässler, 1836)
- Macrogastra plicatula (Draparnaud, 1801)
- Macrogastra rolphii (Turton, 1826)
- Macrogastra ventricosa (Draparnaud, 1801)
- Medora almissana (Küster, 1847) – non-indigenous
- Micropontica caucasica (A. Schmidt, 1868) – non-indigenous
- Neostyriaca corynodes (Held, 1836)
- Pseudofusulus varians (C. Pfeiffer, 1828)
- Ruthenica filograna (Rossmässler, 1836)
- Vestia turgida (Rossmässler, 1836) – extinct

Ferussaciidae

- Cecilioides acicula (O.F. Müller, 1774)

Testacellidae

- Testacella haliotidea (Draparnaud, 1801) – non-indigenous

Discidae

- Discus ruderatus (Férussac, 1821)
- Discus rotundatus (O.F. Müller, 1774)
- Discus perspectivus (M. von Mühlfeldt, 1816)

Helicodiscidae

- Lucilla scintilla (R.T. Lowe, 1852) – non-indigenous
- Lucilla singleyana (Pilsbry, 1889) – non-indigenous

Punctidae

- Paralaoma servilis (Shuttleworth, 1852) – non-indigenous
- Punctum pygmaeum (Draparnaud, 1801)

Gastrodontidae

- Zonitoides arboreus (Say, 1816) – non-indigenous
- Zonitoides excavatus (Alder, 1830)
- Zonitoides nitidus (O.F. Müller, 1774)

Euconulidae

- Euconulus alderi (Gray, 1840)
- Euconulus fulvus (O.F. Müller, 1774)

Oxychilidae

- Aegopinella epipedostoma (Fagot, 1879)
- Aegopinella minor (Stabile, 1864)
- Aegopinella nitens (Michaud, 1831)
- Aegopinella nitidula (Draparnaud, 1805)
- Aegopinella pura (Alder, 1830)
- Aegopinella ressmanni (Westerlund, 1883)
- Daudebardia brevipes (Draparnaud, 1805)
- Daudebardia rufa (Draparnaud, 1805)
- Mediterranea depressa (Sterki, 1880)
- Morlina glabra (Rossmässler, 1835)
- Nesovitrea hammonis (Ström, 1765)
- Nesovitrea petronella (L. Pfeiffer, 1853)
- Oxychilus alliarius (J.S. Miller, 1822)
- Oxychilus cellarius (O.F. Müller, 1774)
- Oxychilus clarus (Held, 1838)
- Oxychilus draparnaudi (H. Beck, 1837)
- Oxychilus mortilleti (L. Pfeiffer, 1859)
- Oxychilus navarricus (Bourguignat, 1870)

Pristilomatidae

- Vitrea contracta (Westerlund, 1870)
- Vitrea crystallina (O.F. Müller, 1774)
- Vitrea diaphana (Studer, 1820)
- Vitrea subrimata (Reinhardt, 1870)
- Vitrea transsylvanica (Clessin, 1877)

Milacidae

- Milax gagates (Draparnaud, 1801) – non-indigenous
- Milax nigricans (Philippi, 1836) – non-indigenous
- Tandonia budapestensis (Hazay, 1880) – non-indigenous
- Tandonia ehrmanni (Simroth, 1910)
- Tandonia rustica (Millet, 1843)

Zonitidae

- Aegopis verticillus (Lamarck, 1822)

Limacidae

- "Limax nyctelius (Bourguignat, 1861)" – identity uncertain, non-indigenous, extinct
- Ambigolimax valentianus (Férussac, 1822) – non-indigenous
- Bielzia coerulans (M. Bielz, 1851) – non-indigenous
- Lehmannia janetscheki Forcart, 1966
- Lehmannia marginata (O.F. Müller, 1774)
- Lehmannia rupicola Lessona & Pollonera, 1882
- Limacus flavus (Linnaeus, 1758) – non-indigenous
- Limacus maculatus (Kaleniczenko 1851) – non-indigenous
- Limax cinereoniger Wolf, 1801
- Limax maximus Linnaeus, 1758
- Malacolimax tenellus (O.F. Müller, 1774)

Agriolimacidae

- Deroceras agreste (Linnaeus, 1758)
- Deroceras invadens Reise, Hutchinson, Schunack & Schlitt, 2013 – non-indigenous
- Deroceras juranum Wüthrich, 1993
- Deroceras klemmi Grossu, 1972 – non-indigenous
- Deroceras laeve (O.F. Müller, 1774)
- Deroceras reticulatum (O.F. Müller, 1774)
- Deroceras sturanyi (Simroth, 1894) – non-indigenous
- Krynickillus melanocephalus Kaleniczenko, 1851 – non-indigenous

Boettgerillidae

- Boettgerilla pallens Simroth, 1912 – non-indigenous

Vitrinidae

- Eucobresia diaphana (Draparnaud, 1805)
- Eucobresia glacialis (Forbes, 1837)
- Eucobresia nivalis (Dummont & Mortillet, 1854)
- Eucobresia pegorarii (Pollonera, 1884)
- Oligolimax annularis (Studer, 1820)
- Phenacolimax major (Férussac, 1807)
- Semilimax kotulae (Westerlund, 1883)
- Semilimax semilimax (Férussac, 1802)
- Vitrina pellucida (O.F. Müller, 1774)
- Vitrinobrachium breve (Férussac, 1821)

Arionidae

- Arion ater (Linnaeus, 1758) s.s. (= Arion ater ater)
- Arion brunneus Lehmann, 1862
- Arion circumscriptus Johnston, 1828
- Arion distinctus Mabille, 1868
- Arion fasciatus (Nilsson, 1823)
- Arion fuscus (O.F. Müller, 1774)
- Arion hortensis (Férussac, 1819)
- Arion intermedius Normand, 1852
- Arion obesoductus Reischütz, 1973 – synonym: Arion alpinus auct. non Pollonera, 1887
- Arion rufus (Linnaeus, 1758) s.l. (= Arion ater rufus + Arion ater ruber)
- Arion silvaticus Lohmander, 1937
- Arion simrothi Künkel, 1909
- Arion subfuscus (Draparnaud, 1805)
- Arion vulgaris Moquin-Tandon, 1855 = Arion lusitanicus auct. non Mabille, 1868 – non-indigenous

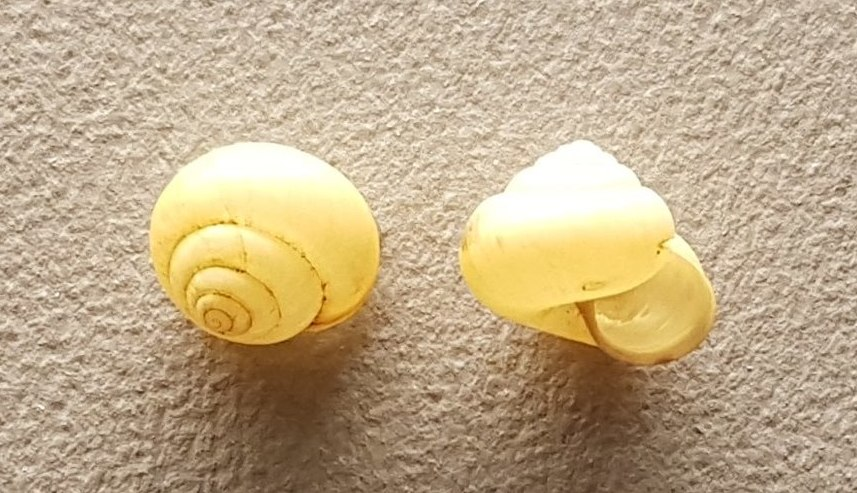
Shell of Fruticola fruticum

Camaenidae

- Fruticicola fruticum (O.F. Müller, 1774)

Geomitridae

- Backeljaia gigaxii (L. Pfeiffer, 1850)
- Candidula intersecta (Poiret, 1801)
- Candidula unifasciata (Poiret, 1801)
- Cernuella cisalpina (Rossmässler, 1837) – non-indigenous
- Cernuella neglecta (Draparnaud, 1805) – non-indigenous
- Cochlicella acuta (O.F. Müller, 1774) – non-indigenous
- Helicella bolenensis (Locard, 1882) – non-indigenous
- Helicella itala (Linnaeus, 1758)
- Helicopsis striata (O.F. Müller, 1774)
- Xerocrassa geyeri (Soós, 1926)
- Xerolenta obvia (Menke, 1828)
- Xerotricha conspurcata (Draparnaud, 1801) – non-indigenous

Helicidae

- Arianta arbustorum (Linnaeus, 1758)
- Caucasotachea vindobonensis (C. Pfeiffer, 1828)
- Causa holosericea (Studer, 1820)
- Cepaea hortensis (O.F. Müller, 1774)
- Cepaea nemoralis (Linnaeus, 1758)
- Chilostoma achates (Rossmässler, 1834)
- Chilostoma cingulatum baldense (Rossmässler, 1839) – non-indigenous
- Chilostoma cingulatum peregrini Falkner, 1998
- Cornu aspersum (O.F. Müller, 1774) – non-indigenous
- Drobacia banatica (Rossmässler, 1838) – non-indigenous
- Campylaea illyrica (Stabille, 1884) – non-indigenous
- Helix pomatia (Linnaeus, 1758)
- Helicigona lapicida (Linnaeus, 1758)
- Isognomostoma isognomostomos (Schröter, 1784)
- Macularia sylvatica (Draparnaud, 1801)
- Theba pisana (O.F. Müller, 1774) – non-indigenous

Helicodontidae

- Helicodonta obvoluta (O.F. Müller, 1774)

Hygromiidae

- Euomphalia strigella (Draparnaud, 1801)
- Hygromia cinctella (Draparnaud, 1801) – non-indigenous
- Monacha cantiana (Montagu, 1803)
- Monacha cartusiana (O.F. Müller, 1774)
- Monacha claustralis (Rossmässler, 1834) – non-indigenous
- Monachoides incarnatus (O.F. Müller, 1774)
- Monachoides vicinus (Rossmässler, 1842)
- Perforatella bidentata (Gmelin, 1791)
- Petasina edentula (Draparnaud, 1805)
- Petasina unidentata (Draparnaud, 1805)
- Plicuteria lubomirskii (Ślósarski, 1881)
- Pseudotrichia rubiginosa (Rossmässler, 1838)
- Trochulus alpicola (Eder, 1921)
- Trochulus clandestinus (Hartmann, 1821)
- Trochulus coelomphala (Locard, 1888)
- Trochulus graminicola (Falkner, 1973)
- Trochulus hispidus (Linnaeus, 1758)
- Trochulus sericeus (Draparnaud, 1801)
- Trochulus striolatus (C. Pfeiffer, 1828)
- Trochulus villosus (Draparnaud, 1805)
- Urticicola umbrosus (C. Pfeiffer, 1828)

== Bivalves ==
Margaritiferidae

- Margaritifera margaritifera (Linnaeus, 1758)

Unionidae

- Unio crassus Philipsson, 1788 – Unio crassus crassus, Unio crassus nanus, Unio crassus cytherea
- Unio mancus Lamarck, 1819
- Unio pictorum (Linnaeus, 1758)
- Unio tumidus Philipsson, 1788
- Anodonta anatina (Linnaeus, 1758)
- Anodonta cygnea (Linnaeus, 1758)
- Pseudanodonta complanata (Rossmässler, 1835) – Pseudanodonta complanata elongata, Pseudanodonta complanata klettii, Pseudanodonta complanata küsteri
- Sinanodonta woodiana (Lea, 1834) – non-indigenous

Corbiculidae

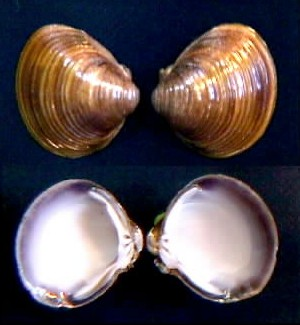
Corbicula fluminalis

- Corbicula fluminalis (O.F. Müller, 1774)
- Corbicula fluminea (O.F. Müller, 1774)

Sphaeriidae

- Sphaerium corneum (Linnaeus, 1758)
- Sphaerium nucleus (S. Studer, 1820)
- Sphaerium ovale (A. Férussac, 1807)
- Sphaerium rivicola (Lamarck, 1818)
- Sphaerium solidum (Normand, 1844)
- Musculium lacustre (O.F. Müller, 1774)
- Musculium transversum (Say, 1829)
- Pisidium amnicum (O.F. Müller, 1774)
- Pisidium casertanum (Poli, 1791)
- Pisidium conventus (Clessin, 1877)
- Pisidium henslowanum (Sheppard, 1823)
- Pisidium hibernicum Westerlund, 1894
- Pisidium interstitiale Bössneck, Groh & Richling, 2020 – endemic to Germany
- Pisidium lilljeborgii (Clessin, 1886)
- Pisidium milium Held, 1836
- Pisidium moitessierianum Paladilhe, 1866
- Pisidium nitidum Jenyns, 1832
- Pisidium obtusale (Lamarck, 1818)
- Pisidium personatum Malm, 1855
- Pisidium pulchellum (Jenyns, 1832)
- Pisidium pseudosphaerium Favre, 1927
- Pisidium subtruncatum Malm, 1855
- Pisidium supinum A. Schmidt, 1851
- Pisidium tenuilineatum Stelfox, 1918

Dreissenidae

- Congeria leucophaeata (Conrad, 1831) – synonym: Mytilopsis leucophaeata (Conrad, 1831)
- Dreissena polymorpha (Pallas, 1771) – non-indigenous
- Dreissena bugensis (Andrusov, 1897) – non-indigenous

== List of hot-house alens in Germany ==
These species have not been recorded in the wild; they live in greenhouses and similar habitats.

Listed alphabetically according to the scientific name:

- Hawaiia minuscula (Binney, 1840)
- Melanoides tuberculata (O.F. Müller, 1774)

== See also ==
Lists of molluscs of surrounding countries:

- List of non-marine molluscs of Poland
- List of non-marine molluscs of the Czech Republic
- List of non-marine molluscs of Austria
- List of non-marine molluscs of Switzerland
- List of non-marine molluscs of France
- List of non-marine molluscs of Luxembourg
- List of non-marine molluscs of Belgium
- List of non-marine molluscs of the Netherlands
- List of non-marine molluscs of Denmark
