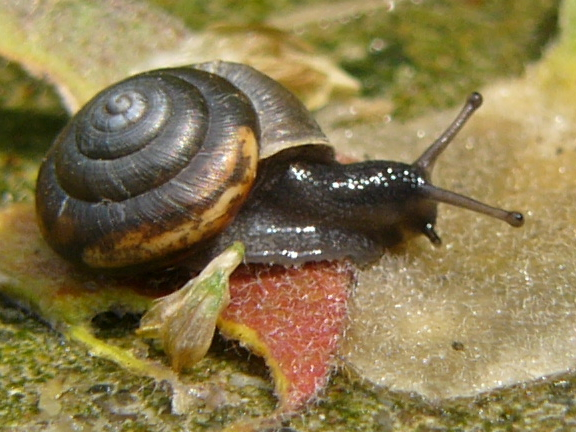
- An older adult individual of Trochulus hispidus with most of the hairs worn off of the shell
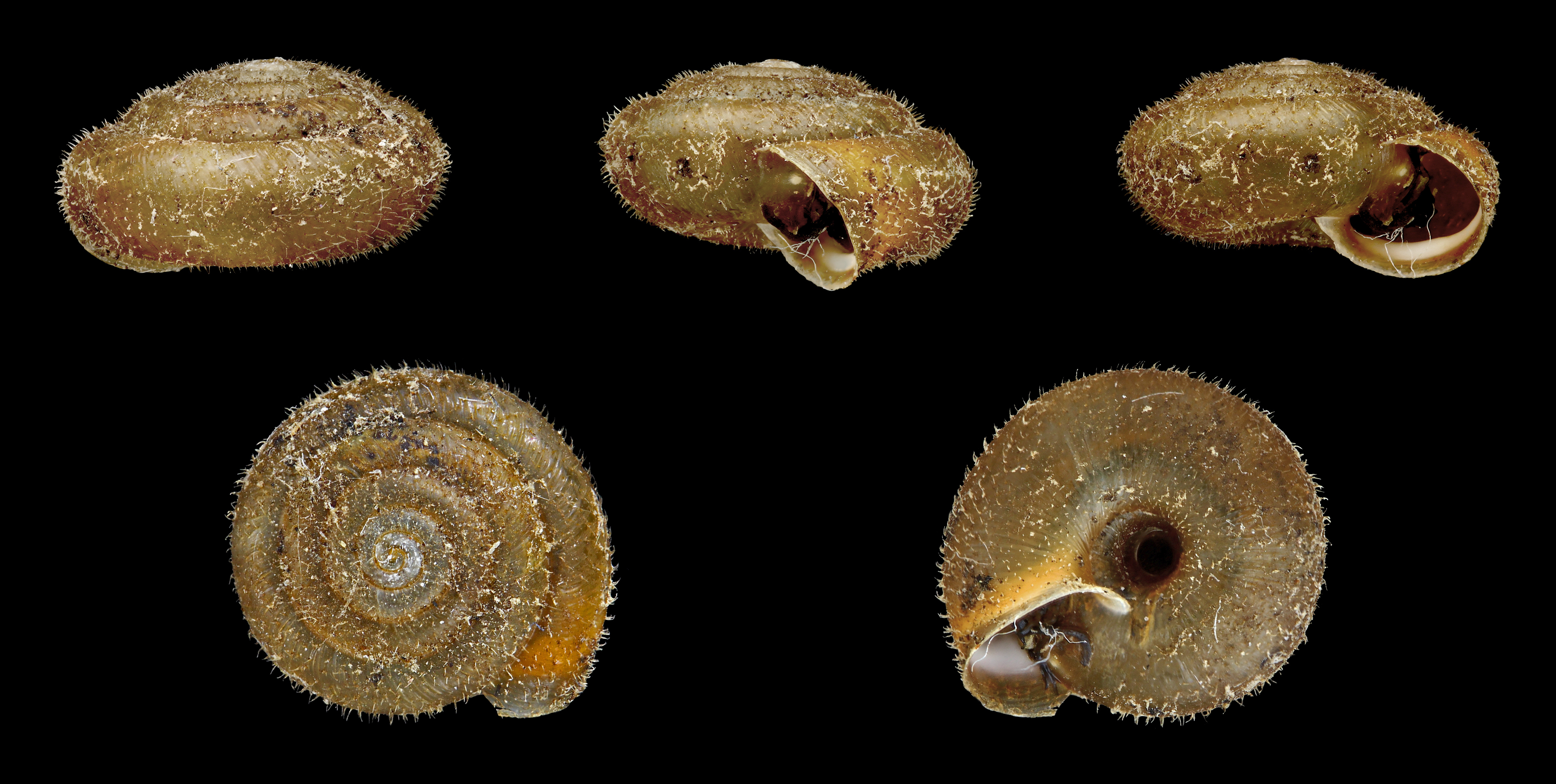
- Five views of a shell of Trochulus hispidus

Scientific classification
- Kingdom: Animalia
- Phylum: Mollusca
- Class: Gastropoda
- Order: Stylommatophora
- Family: Hygromiidae
- Subfamily: Trochulininae
- Tribe: Trochulini
- Genus: Trochulus; Chemnitz, 1786

Synonyms
- Trichia Hartmann, 1840

= Trochulus =

Genus of gastropods

Trochulus is a genus of small air-breathing land snails, terrestrial pulmonate gastropod mollusks in the subfamily Trochulininae of the family Hygromiidae, the hairy snails and their allies.

== Taxonomy ==
Trichia Hartmann, 1840 is a junior synonym of Trochulus Chemnitz, 1786, meaning the name was published after Trochulus to describe the same group of organisms. As such, Trochulus is considered the valid name, but nearly every malacological work prior to 2006 referred to the genus as Trichia.

The genus Plicuteria Schileyko, 1978 has been once recognized as a subgenus within Trochulus by Schileyko (1978). Based on molecular analyses, Trochulus lubomirski does not belong to the genus Trochulus. Trochulus lubomirski (Ślósarski, 1881) is now recognized as Plicuteria lubomirskii (Ślósarski, 1881).

== Species ==
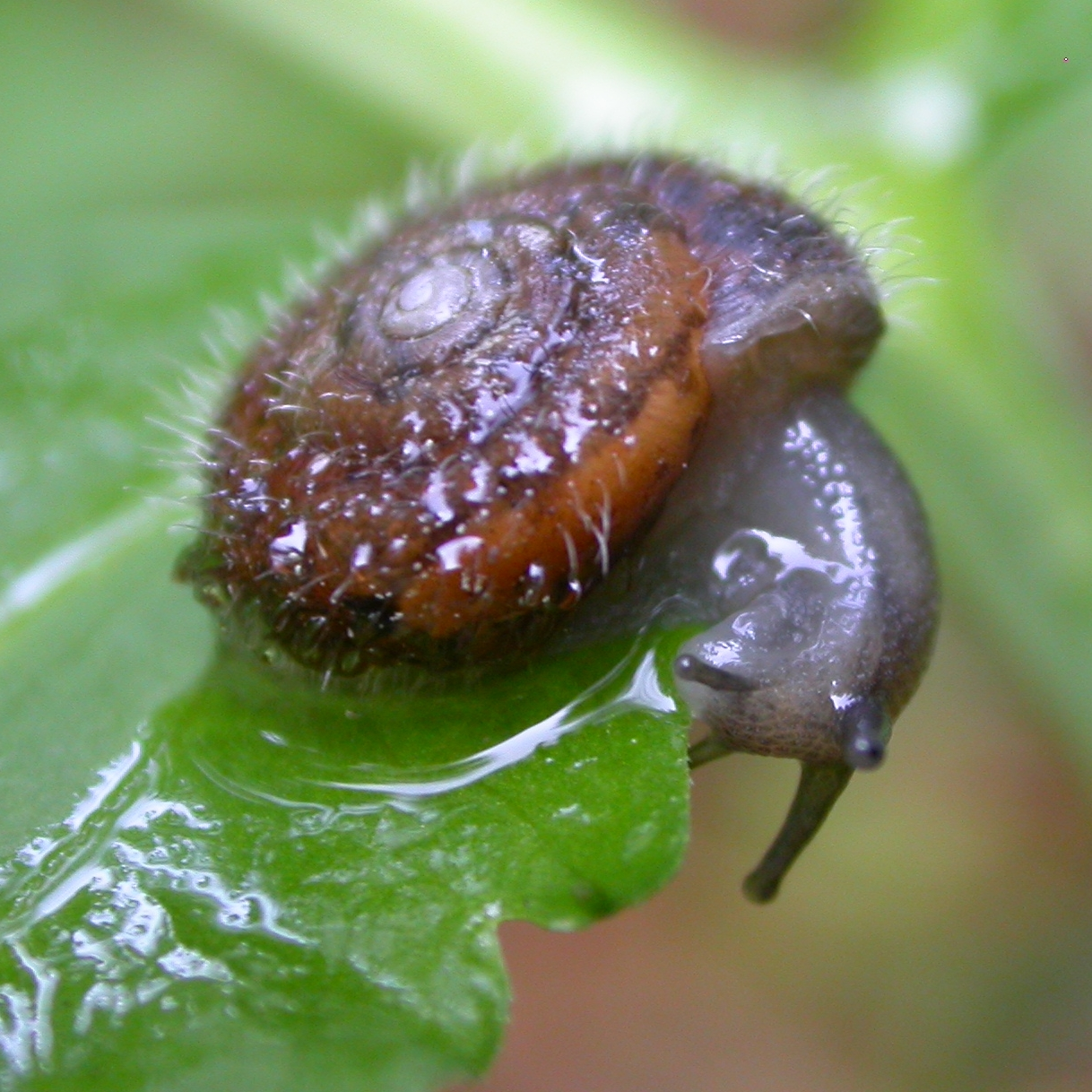
A young individual of Trochulus villosus on a leaf

The speciation centre for the genus Trochulus is in the Alps.

The type species of this genus is Trochulus hispidus.

Species within the genus Trochulus include:

- Trochulus alpicola (Eder, 1921)
- Trochulus ataxiacus (Fagot, 1884)
- Trochulus biconicus (Eder, 1917) - synonym: Trichia biconica
- Trochulus glyptus (Locard, 1880) - synonym: Trochulus caelatus (Studer, 1820) - synonym: Trichia caelata
- Trochulus clandestinus (Hartmann, 1821)
- Trochulus coelomphala (Locard, 1888)
- Trochulus graminicola (Falkner, 1973) - synonym: Trichia gramnicola
- Trochulus hispidus (Linnaeus, 1758) - synonyms: Trichia hispida (Linnaeus, 1758), Trochulus sericeus (Draparnaud, 1801)
- Trochulus montanus (Studer, 1820)
- Trochulus phorochaetius (Bourguignat, 1864)
- Trochulus plebeius (Draparnaud, 1805) - synonym: Trichia plebeia
- Trochulus striolatus (C. Pfeiffer, 1828) - synonym: Trichia striolata
- Trochulus suberectus (Clessin, 1878)
- Trochulus villosus (Draparnaud, 1805)
- Trochulus villosulus - (Rossmässler, 1838) - synonym: Trichia villosula (Rossmässler, 1838)

Species brought into synonymy

- Trochulus erjaveci (Brusina, 1870): synonym of Xerocampylaea erjaveci (Brusina, 1870)
- Trochulus lubomirskii (Ślósarski, 1881): synonym of Plicuteria lubomirskii (Ślósarski, 1881)
- Trochulus oreinos (Wagner, 1915): synonym of Noricella oreinos (Wagner, 1915)
- Trochulus waldemari (Wagner, 1912): synonym of Xerocampylaea waldemari (Wagner, 1912)

== Hair on shells ==
Most Trochulus species have hair-like features on their periostracum (the outermost layer of the shell). Some of the hair-less species still have hairs as juveniles. Hairy shells seemed to be the ancestral character shared by all members within the genus, and the feature was probably lost three times independently later.

These losses were correlated with a shift from humid to dry habitats, hinting at an adaptive function: the hypothesis was that these hair-like protein structures improve movement in moist habitats. In 2005, experiments by Pfenninger and colleagues showed that haired shells attached more easily to wet surfaces. Snails could better cling to their herbaceous food plants during foraging under high humidity levels. The absence of hairs in some Trochulus species, which consequently lose this potential adaptive function, could then be linked to habitat shifts toward drier environments.

== Feeding habits ==
Trochulus species in moist habitats prefer to forage on large-leaved herbaceous plants like Adenostyles, Urtica (nettles), Homogyne or Tussilago (e.g., coltsfoot).
