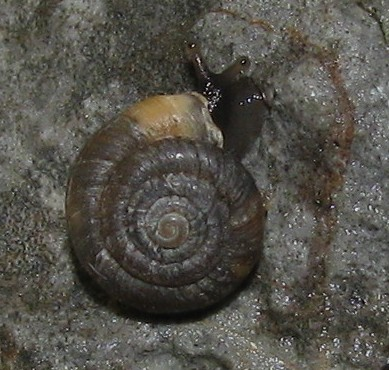
- A live individual of Noricella oreinos

Conservation status
- Near Threatened (IUCN 3.1)

Scientific classification
- Kingdom: Animalia
- Phylum: Mollusca
- Class: Gastropoda
- Order: Stylommatophora
- Family: Hygromiidae
- Genus: Noricella
- Species: N. oreinos

Binomial name
- Noricella oreinos (A. J. Wagner, 1915)

Synonyms
- Fruticicola hispida oreinos; Trichia hispida oreinos; Trichia oreinos; Trochulus oreinos (A. J. Wagner, 1915)

= Noricella oreinos =

Species of gastropod

Noricella oreinos is a species of small air-breathing land snail, a terrestrial pulmonate gastropod mollusk in the family Hygromiidae, the hairy snails and their allies. This species is endemic to Austria.

This species was once confused with Trochulus hispidus, which it superficially resembles, and was therefore assigned to genus Trochulus. Later on, this mistake was realized, and was moved to genus Noricella. Its former subspecies Noricella oreinos scheerpeltzi was elevated to species level.

== Taxonomy ==
Noricella oreinos comprised originally two subspecies: N. o. oreinos (Wagner, 1915) in Lower Austria and Styria and N. o. scheerpeltzi (Mikula, 1954) in Upper Austria. Both taxa were originally described as regional subspecies of Trochulus hispidus. Later these two subspecies were split from Trochulus hispidus and placed in a separate species because of differences in hair morphology. Current comprehensive research, based on molecular, morphological and ecological analyses, confirm this split from T. hispidus. Additionally it was already pointed out that both taxa represent separated mitochondrial lines and different internal genital morphology although there do exist intermediate forms concerning shell morphology. A more detailed genetical study confirmed that there was almost no gene flow between the two taxa, not even in regions were they coexist, which justifies the split into separate species.

== Description ==
Noricella oreinos can be separated from other representatives of the tribe Trochulini by its small, curled hairs, which have a length of 0.03–0.09 mm. Like the other representatives of this tribe, older individuals and empty shells have often lost the hairs on the shell.

The shell is flat to slightly globular, and the shell width is 5.4–7.5 mm (0.21–0.30 in). Other marks are irregular, coarse ridges on the shell and an internal rib with a basal tooth in the peristome, visible as yellow structure from the outside.

The shell of the sister species N. o. scheerpeltzi is characterized by a groove beneath the keel, but there are intermediate forms between the two taxa with an incomplete or weakly developed groove.

While the gross anatomy of the reproductive system is similar to that of the genus Trochulus and its congener N. scheerpeltzi, Noricella oreinos can be unambiguously differentiated by the internal fold pattern of the penis.

== Habitat and distribution ==
Noricella oreinos inhabits primarily boulders, screes and alpine grassland, especially alpine meadows with patchy vegetation coverage, dominated by the sedge species Carex firma, in the Northern Calcareous Alps. Its vertical distribution reaches from the lower subalpine regions to the alpine ecotone, i.e. elevations of 1,400–2,300 metres (4,600–7,500 ft). The distribution range reaches from Schneeberg mountain in Lower Austria to Totes Gebirge in Upper Austria. Like the helicid snail Cylindrus obtusus, this species is suspected to be an ancient native East-alpine endemic, which survived the glacial times on ice-free parts of the north-eastern alpine margins.
