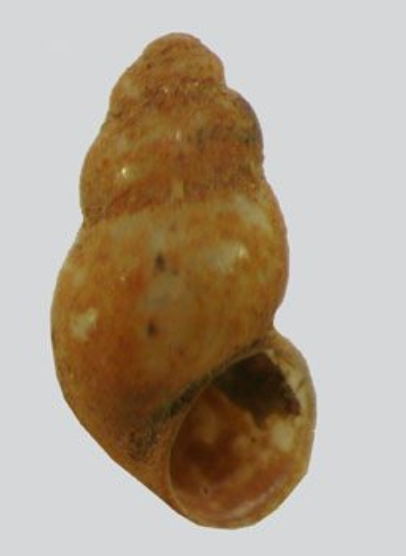
- Shell of Avenionia bourguignati

Scientific classification
- Kingdom: Animalia
- Phylum: Mollusca
- Class: Gastropoda
- Subclass: Caenogastropoda
- Order: Littorinimorpha
- Family: Hydrobiidae
- Subfamily: Islamiinae
- Genus: Avenionia; Nicolas, 1882

Type species
- Avenionia vayssieri Nicolas, 1882

Synonyms
- Paludinella (Paulia) Bourguignat, 1882 (a junior synonym); Paulia Bourguignat, 1882 (invalid: junior homonym of Paulia Gray, 1840 [Echinodermata])

= Avenionia =

Genus of gastropods

Avenionia is a genus of small freshwater snails with a gill and an operculum, aquatic gastropod mollusk in the family Hydrobiidae.

== Species ==
Species within the genus Avenionia include:

- Avenionia berengueri (Bourguignat, 1882)
- Avenionia bourguignati (Locard, 1883)
- Avenionia brevis (Draparnaud, 1805)
- Avenionia roberti Boeters, 1967

Synonyms

- † Avenionia fossilis Youluo, 1978 (unavailable name)
- Avenionia ligustica Fo. Giusti & Bodon, 1981: synonym of Alzoniella ligustica (Fo. Giusti & Bodon, 1981) (original combination)
- Avenionia parvula Fo. Giusti & Bodon, 1981: synonym of Alzoniella parvula (Fo. Giusti & Bodon, 1981) (original combination)
- Avenionia vayssieri Nicolas, 1882: synonym of Avenionia berenguieri (Bourguignat, 1882)
