= Odostomia nardoi =

Scientific classification
- Kingdom: Animalia
- Phylum: Mollusca
- Class: Gastropoda
- Family: Pyramidellidae
- Genus: Odostomia
- Species: O. nardoi

Binomial name
- Odostomia nardoi Brusina, 1869

Synonyms
- Odostomia (Brachystomia) nardoi nardoi Brusina, 1869

Species of gastropod

Odostomia nardoi is a species of sea snail, a marine gastropod mollusc in the family Pyramidellidae, the pyrams and their allies.

== Description ==
The shell grows to a length of 1.6 mm.

== Distribution ==
This species occurs in the following locations:

- Greek Exclusive Economic Zone
- Portuguese Exclusive Economic Zone
- Spanish Exclusive Economic Zone
- the Black Sea
