= Avenionia brevis =

Conservation status
- Least Concern (IUCN 3.1)

Scientific classification
- Kingdom: Animalia
- Phylum: Mollusca
- Class: Gastropoda
- Subclass: Caenogastropoda
- Order: Littorinimorpha
- Family: Hydrobiidae
- Genus: Avenionia
- Species: A. brevis

Binomial name
- Avenionia brevis (Draparnaud, 1805)

Synonyms
- Avenionia brevis brevis (Draparnaud, 1805) (a junior synonym); Bythinella brevis (Draparnaud, 1805) superseded combination; Bythinella jurana Locard, 1893 (a junior synonym); Bythinella pupoides jurana Locard, 1893 (a junior synonym); Bythinia brevis Draparnaud, 1805; Cyclostoma breve Draparnaud, 1805

Species of gastropod

Avenionia brevis is a species of small freshwater snail with a gill and an operculum, an aquatic gastropod mollusk in the family Hydrobiidae.

== Description ==
The length of the shell attains 2 mm, its diameter 0.75 mm.

(Original description in French) The shell is very small, short, oval, and somewhat cylindrical, with a whitish, transparent coloration. The spire is composed of three whorls, the first of which is very small, while the second is proportionally very large, increasing almost suddenly in size. The suture is deep, and the aperture is oval. No umbilicus is visible, and the umbilical chink is barely perceptible.

== Distribution ==
This species is found in eastern France. It is known from freshwater springs, and is suspected to also live in subterranean habitats. The species is protected by law in France.

== Synonyms ==
- Avenionia brevis berenguieri (Bourguignat, 1882): synonym of Avenionia berenguieri (Bourguignat, 1882) (unaccepted rank)
- Avenionia brevis bourguignati (Locard, 1883): synonym of Avenionia bourguignati (Locard, 1883) (unaccepted rank)
- Avenionia brevis brevis (Draparnaud, 1805): synonym of Avenionia brevis (Draparnaud, 1805) (a junior synonym)
- Avenionia brevis roberti Boeters, 1967: synonym of Avenionia roberti Boeters, 1967 (unaccepted rank)
