= Mangelia perforata =

Scientific classification
- Kingdom: Animalia
- Phylum: Mollusca
- Class: Gastropoda
- Subclass: Caenogastropoda
- Order: Neogastropoda
- Superfamily: Conoidea
- Family: Mangeliidae
- Genus: Mangelia
- Species: M. perforata

Binomial name
- Mangelia perforata (Brusina, 1877)

Synonyms
- Cythara (Mangelia) detmersiana (Böttger, 1901); Mangelia perforata Brusina, 1931; Mangilia detmersiana Böttger, 1901; Mangilia monterosati Bellardi, 1877; Mangilia perforata (Brusina, 1877); Pleurotoma caerulans Philippi, 1856 (original description); Raphitoma (Mangilia) perforata Brusina, 1877

Extinct species of gastropod

Mangelia perforata is an extinct species of sea snail, a marine gastropod mollusk in the family Mangeliidae.

== Description ==
The length of the shell attains 6.8 mm, its diameter is 2.8 mm.

== Distribution ==
This extinct marine species was found in the Middle Miocene strata in Poland and from Kostej in Transylvania.
