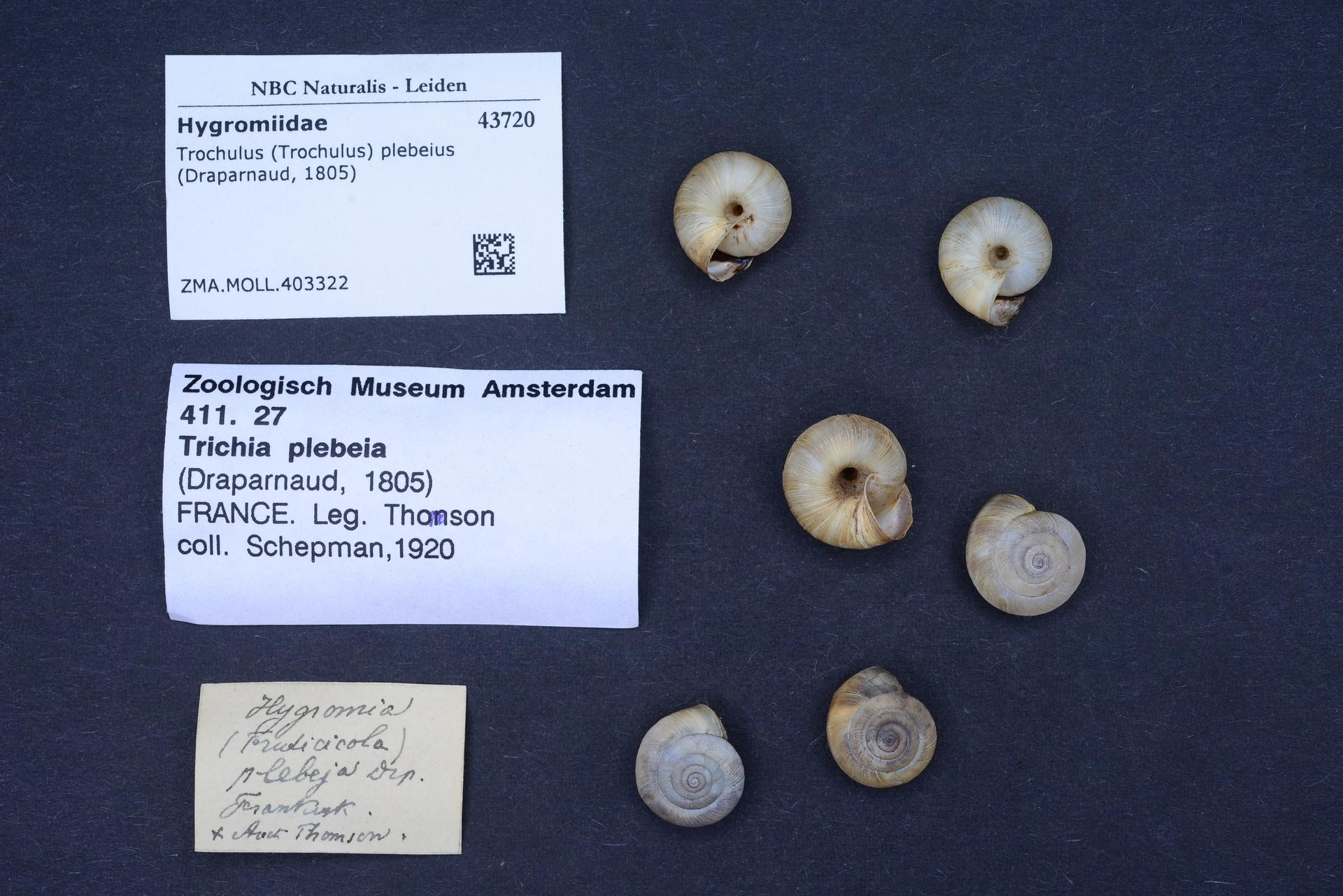

Scientific classification
- Kingdom: Animalia
- Phylum: Mollusca
- Class: Gastropoda
- Order: Stylommatophora
- Family: Hygromiidae
- Genus: Trochulus
- Species: T. plebeius

Binomial name
- Trochulus plebeius Draparnaud, 1805

Synonyms
- Trichia plebeius

= Trochulus plebeius =

Species of gastropod

Trochulus plebeius is a species of air-breathing land snail, a pulmonate gastropod mollusk in the family Hygromiidae, the hairy snails and their allies.
