= Mangelia sandrii =

Scientific classification
- Kingdom: Animalia
- Phylum: Mollusca
- Class: Gastropoda
- Subclass: Caenogastropoda
- Order: Neogastropoda
- Superfamily: Conoidea
- Family: Mangeliidae
- Genus: Mangelia
- Species: M. sandrii

Binomial name
- Mangelia sandrii (Brusina, 1865)

Synonyms
- Mangiliella sandrii (Brusina, 1865)

Species of gastropod

Mangelia sandrii is a species of sea snail, a marine gastropod mollusk in the family Mangeliidae.

== Distribution ==
This species occurs in European waters.
