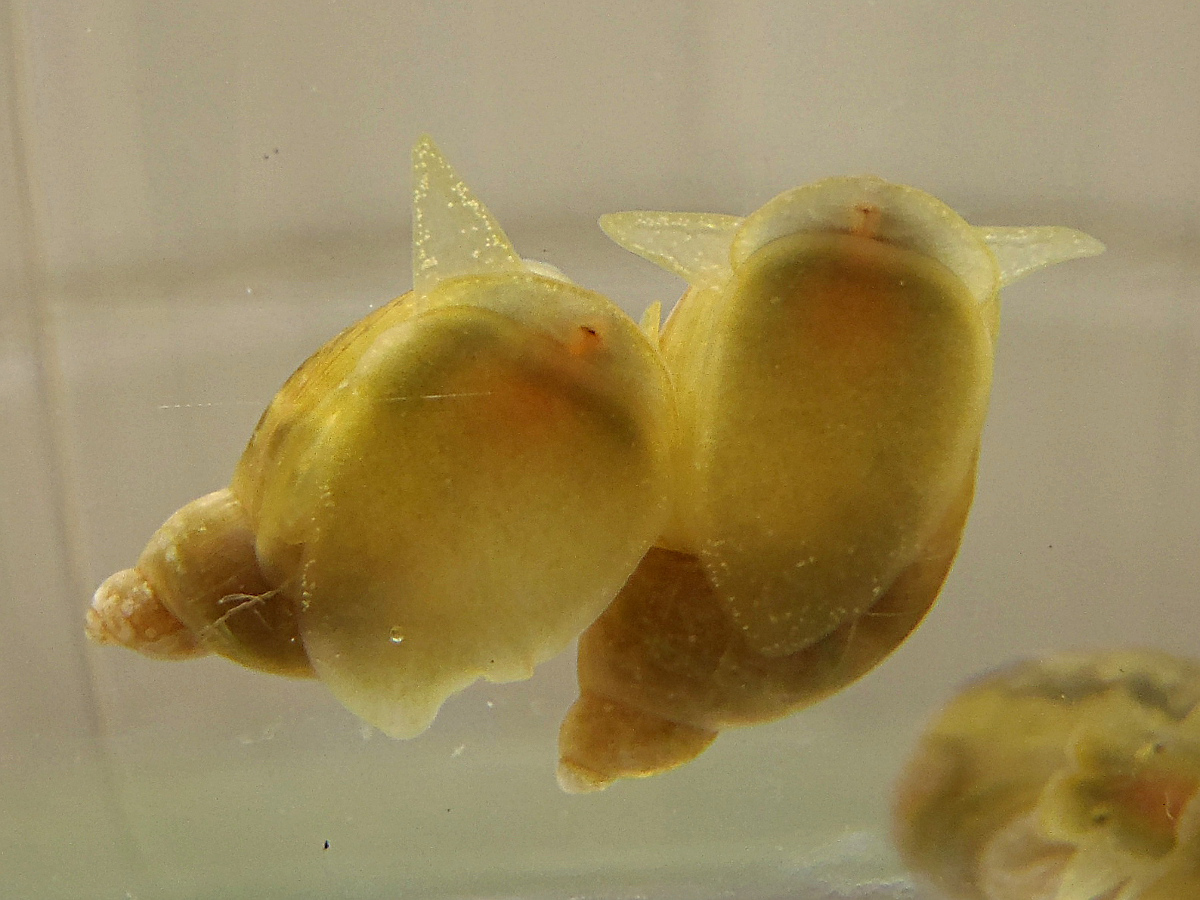
- Ampullaceana lagotis

Scientific classification
- Domain: Eukaryota
- Kingdom: Animalia
- Phylum: Mollusca
- Class: Gastropoda
- Superorder: Hygrophila
- Family: Lymnaeidae
- Genus: Ampullaceana; Servain, 1882

= Ampullaceana =

Genus of freshwater snails

Ampullaceana is a genus of gastropods belonging to the family Lymnaeidae.

The species of this genus are found in Eurasia.

Species:

- Ampullaceana ampla (W.Hartmann, 1821)
- Ampullaceana balthica (Linnaeus, 1758)
- Ampullaceana dipkunensis (Gundrizer & Starobogatov, 1979)
- Ampullaceana fontinalis (S.Studer, 1820)
- Ampullaceana intermedia (Lamarck, 1822)
- Ampullaceana lagotis (Schrank, 1803)
- Ampullaceana relicta (Poliński, 1929)
