= Draparnaldiopsis =

Scientific classification
- Clade: Viridiplantae
- Division: Chlorophyta
- Class: Chlorophyceae
- Order: Chaetophorales
- Family: Chaetophoraceae
- Genus: Draparnaldiopsis; G.M. Smith & Klyver, 1929

Type species
- Draparnaldiopsis alpinis

Species
- Draparnaldiopsis alpinis; Draparnaldiopsis krishnamurthyi; Draparnaldiopsis salishensis; Draparnaldiopsis simplex; Draparnaldiopsis taylorii

Genus of algae

Draparnaldiopsis is a genus of green algae in the family Chaetophoraceae.

The genus name of Draparnaldiopsis is in honour of Jacques Philippe Raymond Draparnaud (1772–1804), who was a French naturalist, malacologist and botanist.

The genus was circumscribed by Gilbert Morgan Smith and Frederick Detlev Klyver in Trans. Amer. Microscop. Soc. Vol.48 on page 200 in 1929.
