= Avenionia berengueri =

Scientific classification
- Kingdom: Animalia
- Phylum: Mollusca
- Class: Gastropoda
- Subclass: Caenogastropoda
- Order: Littorinimorpha
- Family: Hydrobiidae
- Genus: Avenionia
- Species: A. berengueri

Binomial name
- Avenionia berengueri (Bourguignat, 1882)

Synonyms
- Avenionia brevis berenguieri (Bourguignat, 1882) (unaccepted rank); Avenionia vayssieri Nicolas, 1882; Bithinella berengueri (Bourguignat, 1882); Paulia berenguieri Bourguignat, 1882 (basionym); Paulia locardiana Bourguignat, 1882 (a junior synonym)

Species of gastropod

Avenionia berengueri is a species of small freshwater snail with a gill and an operculum, an aquatic gastropod mollusk in the family Hydrobiidae.

== Description ==
The length of the shell attains 4 mm, its diameter 2 mm.

(Original description in Latin) The scarcely rimate shell is elongately cylindrical, highly fragile, diaphanous, and has a pale, somewhat horn-like color. It is smooth to the naked eye, though under a very powerful lens, it reveals extremely fine, subtle striations.

The spire is produced and only slightly attenuated, terminating in an obtuse apex. It consists of five lightly convex whorls that increase regularly and fairly rapidly in size. These whorls are separated by a slightly impressed suture, which becomes more distinctly impressed between the final whorls and grows deep as it approaches the aperture. The body whorl is scarcely larger than the others, equaling one-third of the total height, and is well-rounded.

The aperture is vertical and precisely ovate. The peristome is continuous, fragile, and straight, becoming slightly reflected at the columellar margin.

== Distribution ==
This species is found in southern France. It is known from freshwater springs.
