= Trochulus montanus =

Scientific classification
- Kingdom: Animalia
- Phylum: Mollusca
- Class: Gastropoda
- Order: Stylommatophora
- Family: Hygromiidae
- Genus: Trochulus
- Species: T. montanus

Binomial name
- Trochulus montanus Studer, 1820

Synonyms
- Glischrus (Helix) montana S. Studer, 1820 (original name); Helix (Trichia) montana (S. Studer, 1820) superseded combination; Trichia (Trichia) montana (S. Studer, 1820) (superseded generic combination); Trichia montana (S. Studer, 1820) (superseded generic combination)

Species of gastropod

Trochulus montanus is a species of air-breathing land snail, a pulmonate gastropod mollusk in the family Hygromiidae, the hairy snails and their allies.
