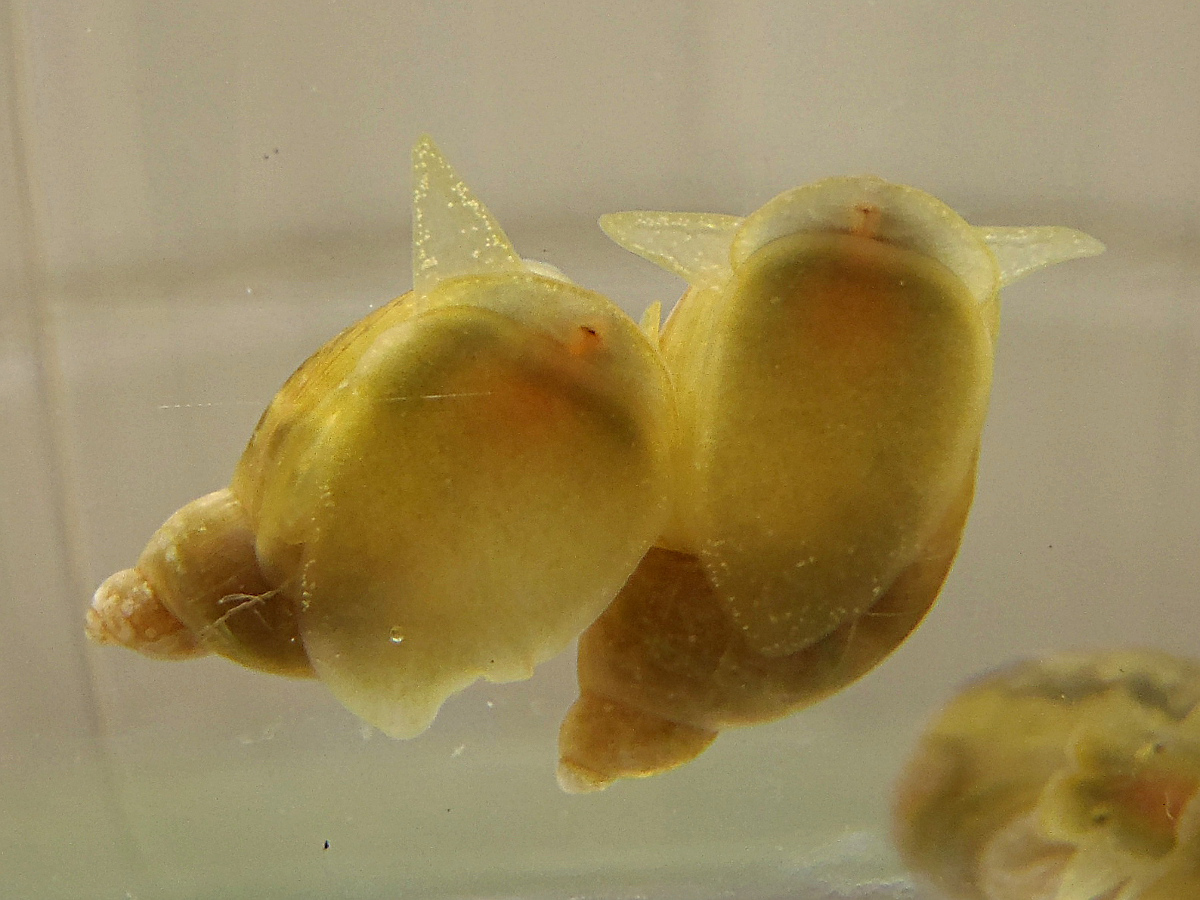

Scientific classification
- Domain: Eukaryota
- Kingdom: Animalia
- Phylum: Mollusca
- Class: Gastropoda
- Superorder: Hygrophila
- Family: Lymnaeidae
- Genus: Ampullaceana
- Species: A. lagotis

Binomial name
- Ampullaceana lagotis (Schrank, 1803)

Synonyms
- Radix lagotis (Schrank, 1803)

= Ampullaceana lagotis =

Species of gastropod

Ampullaceana lagotis is a species of freshwater gastropods belonging to the family Lymnaeidae.

The species is found in Eurasia.
