= Trochulus caelatus =

Conservation status
- Near Threatened (IUCN 3.1)

Scientific classification
- Kingdom: Animalia
- Phylum: Mollusca
- Class: Gastropoda
- Order: Stylommatophora
- Family: Hygromiidae
- Genus: Trochulus
- Species: T. caelatus

Binomial name
- Trochulus caelatus (Studer, 1820)

Synonyms
- Trichia caelata

Species of gastropod

Trochulus caelatus is a species of small, air-breathing land snail, a terrestrial pulmonate gastropod mollusk in the family Hygromiidae, the hairy snails and their allies.

== Distribution ==
This species is endemic to the northwestern Jura Mountains, Switzerland.

== Description ==
The shell height is about 4 mm, and the width is around 8 mm. The shell is typically adorned with hair-like structures, which are a characteristic feature of many species within the genus Trochulus. Trochulus caelatus is usually found in rocky environments within its limited geographic range.
