= Xerocampylaea =

Scientific classification
- Kingdom: Animalia
- Phylum: Mollusca
- Class: Gastropoda
- Order: Stylommatophora
- Family: Hygromiidae
- Genus: Xerocampylaea; Kobelt, 1871

Genus of land snails

Xerocampylaea is a genus of gastropods belonging to the family Hygromiidae.

The species of this genus are found in the Balkans.

Species:

- Xerocampylaea blaui (Kobelt, 1892)
- Xerocampylaea costulata (Wohlberedt, 1909)
- Xerocampylaea erjaveci (Brusina, 1870)
- Xerocampylaea fallax (A. J. Wagner, 1914)
- Xerocampylaea floerickei (Kobelt, 1898)
- Xerocampylaea hirci (Clessin, 1883)
- Xerocampylaea kosovoensis (de Winter & Maassen, 1992)
- Xerocampylaea leptolasia (A. J. Wagner, 1912)
- Xerocampylaea osoria (Brancsik, 1890)
- Xerocampylaea serbica (A. J. Wagner, 1912)
- Xerocampylaea taraensis (de Winter & Maassen, 1992)
- Xerocampylaea waldemari (A. J. Wagner, 1912)
- Xerocampylaea zelebori (Pfeiffer, 1853)
