= Trochulus biconicus =

Conservation status
- Endangered (IUCN 3.1)

Scientific classification
- Kingdom: Animalia
- Phylum: Mollusca
- Class: Gastropoda
- Order: Stylommatophora
- Family: Hygromiidae
- Genus: Trochulus
- Species: T. biconicus

Binomial name
- Trochulus biconicus (Eder, 1917)

Synonyms
- Trichia biconica

Species of gastropod

Trochulus biconicus is a species of air-breathing land snail, a pulmonate gastropod mollusk in the family Hygromiidae, the hairy snails and their allies. It was first described by the Swiss malacologist Leo Eder in 1917.

This species is endemic to Switzerland, where it grows on rock outcrops and grassy limestone screes with sparse vegetation. Since its original discovery in Bannalper Schonegg, it has since been documented in various cantons: Uri, Obwalden, and Nidwalden.

== Species summary ==
Summary for Trochulus biconicus
Taxon name	biconic fruit tree
Distribution	Central Switzerland (Bannalper Schonegg)
Size	2.5–3.5 x 5–6 mm
Family	Hygromiidae
Higher group	Gastropoda

== Description ==
Trochulus biconicus is a species of small terrestrial snail characterised by its flattened shell with a low spire. The shell consists of 5 to 6.5 tightly coiled whorls that increase slowly but regularly in size, with the body whorl (the final and largest whorl) about twice the width of the first whorl.

The shell measures 2.5 to 3.5 mm in height and 5.0 to 7.0 mm in width, giving it a height-to-width ratio of 0.48 to 0.57. The body whorl has a height of 2.5 to 2.8 mm, which is 78% to 90% of the total shell height. The aperture (the opening of the shell) is narrow and crescent-shaped with a whitish lip. Both the basal and palatal (outer) margins of the aperture are slightly turned outward. The umbilicus (the central cavity on the underside of the shell) is deep and permanently open, with major and minor diameters of 0.9 to 1.3 mm and 0.8 to 1.1 mm respectively, comprising 16% to 19% of the overall shell diameter.

Adult specimens lack hairs on their shells, which are pale brown in colour and display irregular growth lines that are more pronounced on the upper surface than on the underside.

The reproductive system of Trochulus biconicus features four elongated mucous glands and inner dart sacs that are slightly longer than the outer ones. The vagina is long and cylindrical. The flagellum (a whip-like structure) exceeds the length of the epiphallus (the tube connecting the vas deferens to the penis), which in turn is longer than the fusiform (spindle-shaped) penis. The spermatheca duct is straight, leading to an oval spermatheca that does not extend as far as the albumen gland.
