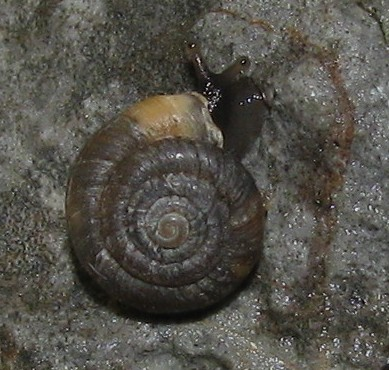
- A live individual of Noricella oreinos oreinos

Scientific classification
- Kingdom: Animalia
- Phylum: Mollusca
- Class: Gastropoda
- Order: Stylommatophora
- Family: Hygromiidae
- Genus: Noricella; Neiber, Razkin & Hausdorf, 2017

= Noricella =

Genus of gastropods

Noricella is a genus of small air-breathing land snails, terrestrial pulmonate gastropod mollusks in the family Hygromiidae, the hairy snails and their allies. This genus is endemic to Austria. It contains two species, Noricella oreinos and Noricella scheerpeltzi. The name is derived from the ancient Roman province Noricum, which covered large parts of the Austrian Alps.

== Species ==
- Noricella oreinos (Wagner, 1915)
- Noricella scheerpeltzi (Mikula, 1957)
