= Avenionia roberti =

Conservation status
- Near Threatened (IUCN 3.1)

Scientific classification
- Kingdom: Animalia
- Phylum: Mollusca
- Class: Gastropoda
- Subclass: Caenogastropoda
- Order: Littorinimorpha
- Family: Hydrobiidae
- Genus: Avenionia
- Species: A. roberti

Binomial name
- Avenionia roberti Boeters, 1967

Synonyms
- Avenionia brevis roberti Boeters, 1967 (unaccepted rank)

Species of gastropod

Avenionia roberti is a species of small freshwater snail with a gill and an operculum, an aquatic gastropod mollusk or micromollusk in the family Hydrobiidae.

== Distribution and conservation status ==
A. roberti occurs in Germany, where it is considered critically endangered (vom Aussterben bedroht), Belgium and the Netherlands.

== Habitat and ecology ==
A. roberti inhabits groundwaters in karst areas.
