= Trochulus villosulus =

Scientific classification
- Kingdom: Animalia
- Phylum: Mollusca
- Class: Gastropoda
- Order: Stylommatophora
- Family: Hygromiidae
- Genus: Trochulus
- Species: T. villosulus

Binomial name
- Trochulus villosulus (Rossmässler, 1838)

Synonyms
- Trichia villosula (Rossmässler, 1838)

Species of gastropod

Trochulus villosulus is a species of air-breathing land snail, a terrestrial pulmonate gastropod mollusk in the family Hygromiidae, the hairy snails and their allies.

== Diet ==
The trochulus species diet varies based on habitat. In moist regions, trochulus prefer to scavenge for large-leaved plants like Adenostyles, Urtica (nettles), Homogyne, or Tussilago.

== Distribution ==
This species is known to occur in:

- Ukraine
