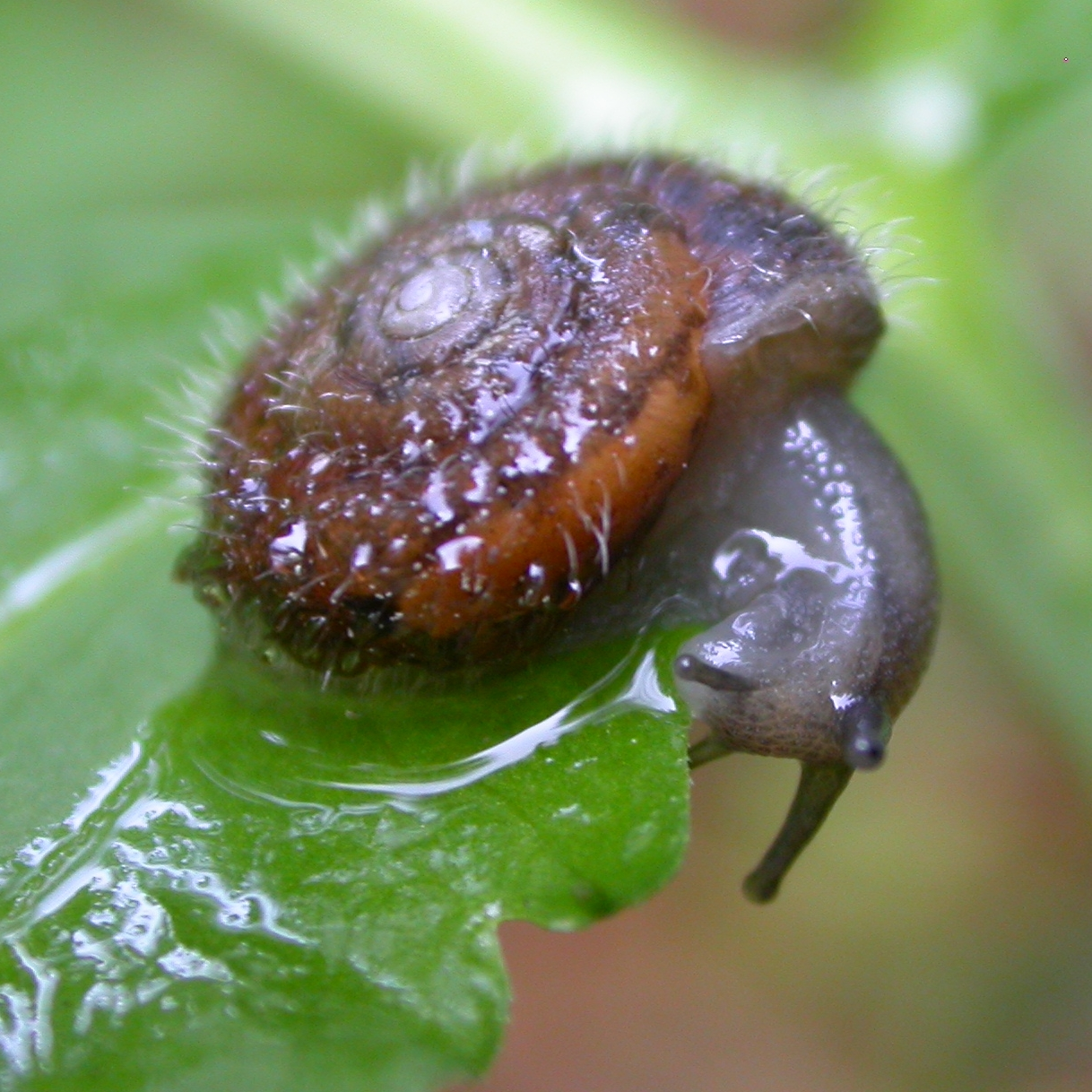

Scientific classification
- Kingdom: Animalia
- Phylum: Mollusca
- Class: Gastropoda
- Order: Stylommatophora
- Family: Hygromiidae
- Genus: Trochulus
- Species: T. villosus

Binomial name
- Trochulus villosus (Draparnaud, 1805)

Synonyms
- List: Fruticicola villosa (Draparnaud, 1805); Helix villosa Draparnaud, 1805; Helix villosa var. rubra Clessin, 1871; Trichia (Trichia) villosa (Draparnaud, 1805)

= Trochulus villosus =

Species of gastropod

Trochulus villosus is a species of small, air-breathing land snail, a terrestrial pulmonate gastropod mollusk in the family Hygromiidae, the hairy snails and their allies.

== Distribution ==
This species occurs in Germany.
