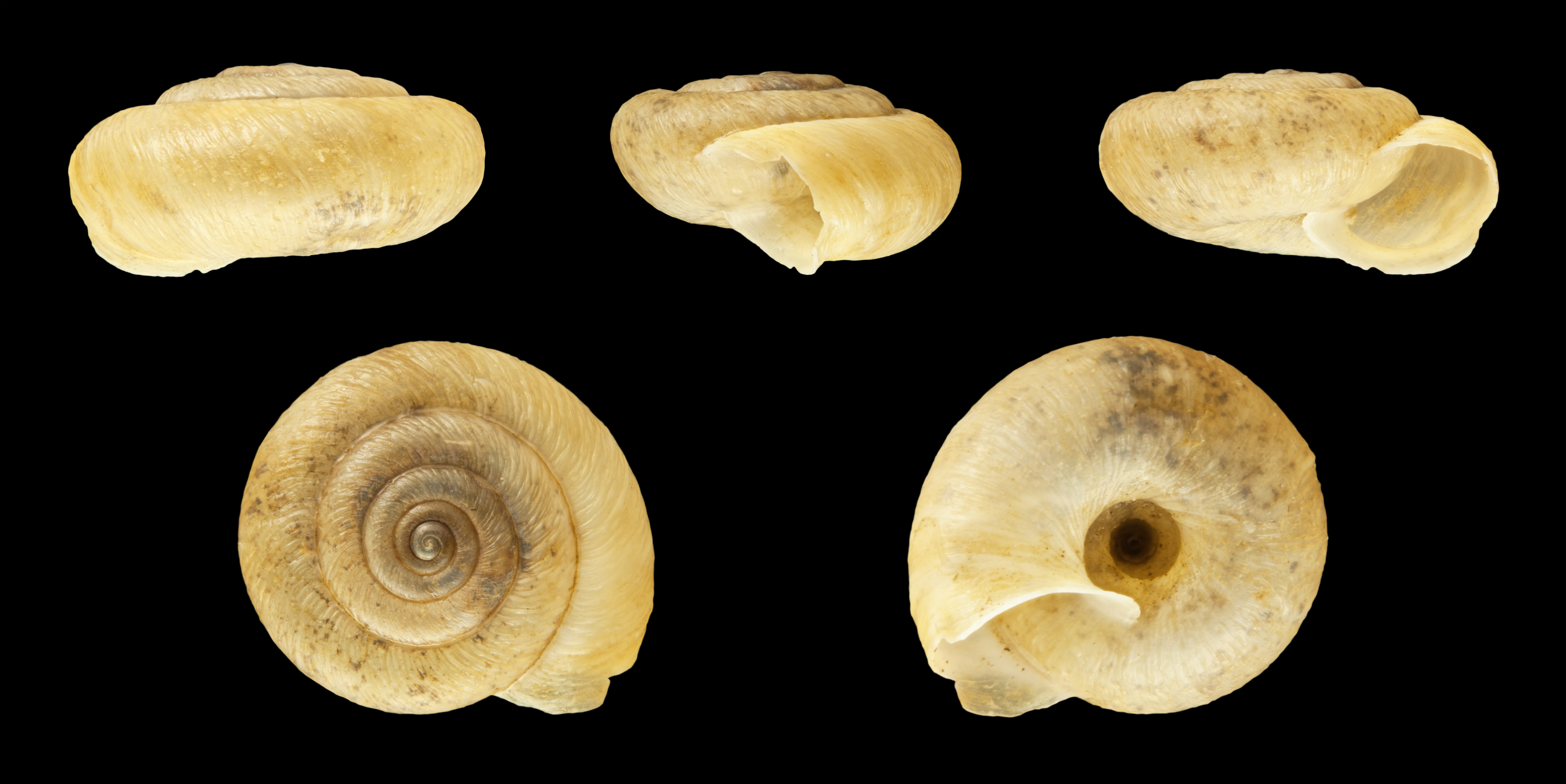

Conservation status
- Near Threatened (IUCN 3.1)

Scientific classification
- Kingdom: Animalia
- Phylum: Mollusca
- Class: Gastropoda
- Order: Stylommatophora
- Family: Hygromiidae
- Genus: Trochulus
- Species: T. graminicola

Binomial name
- Trochulus graminicola (Falkner, 1973)

Synonyms
- Trichia graminicola

= Trochulus graminicola =

Species of gastropod

Trochulus graminicola is a species of small, air-breathing land snail, a terrestrial pulmonate gastropod mollusk in the family Hygromiidae, the hairy snails and their allies. This species is endemic to Germany.
