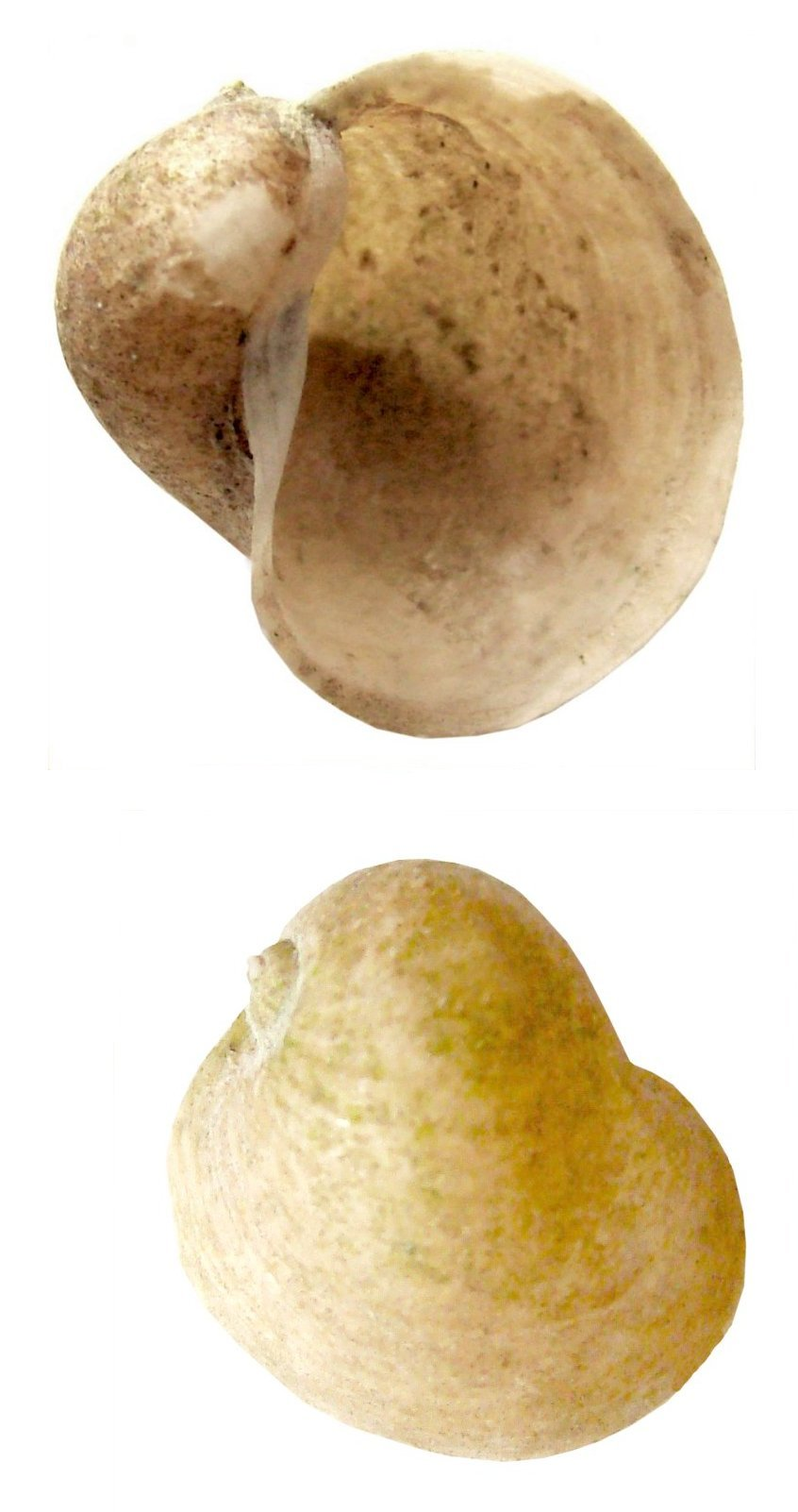
- Shells of Ampullaceana ampla

Scientific classification
- Kingdom: Animalia
- Phylum: Mollusca
- Class: Gastropoda
- Superorder: Hygrophila
- Family: Lymnaeidae
- Genus: Ampullaceana
- Species: A. ampla

Binomial name
- Ampullaceana ampla (Hartmann, 1841)

Synonyms
- Gulnaria monnardi W. Hartmann, 1841 (a junior synonym); Limneus auricularius var. ampla Hartmann, 1841; Limneus auricularius var. hartmanni W. Hartmann, 1821 (a junior synonym); Limneus hartmanni Studer, 1820 (nomen nudum (no description)); Lymnaea (Peregriana) hartmanni (W. Hartmann, 1821) (a junior synonym); Lymnaea (Peregriana) monnardi (Hartmann, 1841) (a junior synonym); Lymnaea (Peregriana) patula (Da Costa, 1778) (a junior synonym); Lymnaea peregra ampla (Hartmann, 1821); Lymnaea tobolica Lazareva, 1967; Radix ampla (W. Hartmann, 1821)

= Ampullaceana ampla =

Species of gastropod

Ampullaceana ampla is a species of air-breathing freshwater snail, an aquatic pulmonate gastropod mollusc in the family Lymnaeidae, the pond snails.

== Distribution ==
This species is found in European countries including:

- Germany
- Poland
- Czech Republic
- Slovakia
- and others in Central and Eastern Europe.Then across the Palearctic to Siberia' The species lives in calm parts of rivers and lakes. They mostly stay on the shoreline near the water surface. A. ampla is relatively rare.
