= Xerocampylaea waldemari =

Conservation status
- Least Concern (IUCN 3.1)

Scientific classification
- Kingdom: Animalia
- Phylum: Mollusca
- Class: Gastropoda
- Order: Stylommatophora
- Family: Hygromiidae
- Genus: Xerocampylaea
- Species: X. waldemari

Binomial name
- Xerocampylaea waldemari (A. J. Wagner, 1912)

Synonyms
- Trichia waldemari; Trochulus waldemari

Species of gastropod

Xerocampylaea waldemari is a species of air-breathing land snail, a pulmonate gastropod mollusk in the family Hygromiidae, the hairy snails and their allies. It was for long time seen as a member of the genus Trochulus, but moved to the genus Xerocampylaea after more comprehensive research. This species is endemic to Bosnia and Herzegovina.
