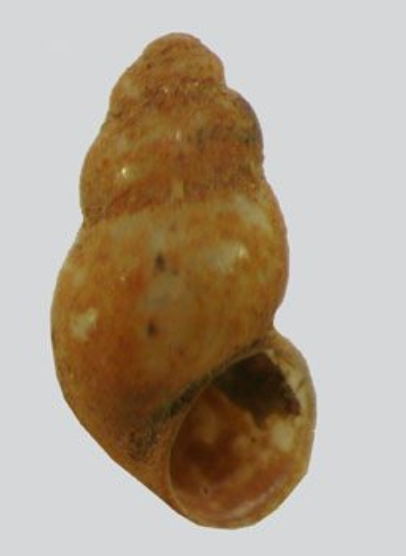
- Shell of Avenionia bourguignati (specimen in the Natural History Museum, Rotterdam)

Scientific classification
- Kingdom: Animalia
- Phylum: Mollusca
- Class: Gastropoda
- Subclass: Caenogastropoda
- Order: Littorinimorpha
- Family: Hydrobiidae
- Genus: Avenionia
- Species: A. bourguignati

Binomial name
- Avenionia bourguignati (Locard, 1883)

Synonyms
- Avenionia brevis bourguignati (Locard, 1883) (unaccepted rank); Bithinella bourguignati (Locard, 1883); Bythinella bourguignati (Locard, 1883); Bythinella lepta Locard, 1893 (a junior synonym); Paulia berenguieri bourguignati Locard, 1893 (unaccepted rank); Paulia bourguignati Locard, 1883 superseded combination

= Avenionia bourguignati =

Species of gastropod

Avenionia bourguignati is a species of small freshwater snail with a gill and an operculum, an aquatic gastropod mollusk in the family Hydrobiidae.

== Description ==
The length of the shell attains 2.5 mm, its diameter 1 mm.

(Original description in French) The shell is subcylindrical and somewhat short, consisting of four to five fairly convex whorls that increase rapidly in size. The body whorl is slightly ventricose at the top, and the suture is well-marked. The umbilical chink is very narrow, and the aperture is suboval and only slightly oblique. The shell itself is encrusted and blackish in color.

== Distribution ==
This species is found in central France and the Netherlands. It is known from freshwater springs.
