= Bythiospeum acicula =

Conservation status
- Vulnerable (IUCN 3.1)

Scientific classification
- Kingdom: Animalia
- Phylum: Mollusca
- Class: Gastropoda
- Subclass: Caenogastropoda
- Order: Littorinimorpha
- Family: Moitessieriidae
- Genus: Bythiospeum
- Species: B. acicula

Binomial name
- Bythiospeum acicula (Hartmann, 1821)

Synonyms
- Bythiospeum algoviensis Uhl, 1934; Bythiospeum rougemonti Clessin, 1882

Species of gastropod

Bythiospeum acicula is a species of very small freshwater snails that have an operculum, aquatic gastropod mollusks in the family Moitessieriidae.

This species is endemic to Germany.
