= Trochulus suberectus =

Scientific classification
- Kingdom: Animalia
- Phylum: Mollusca
- Class: Gastropoda
- Order: Stylommatophora
- Family: Hygromiidae
- Genus: Trochulus
- Species: T. suberectus

Binomial name
- Trochulus suberectus Clessin, 1878

Synonyms
- Trichia suberectus

Species of gastropod

Trochulus suberectus is a species of air-breathing land snail, a pulmonate gastropod mollusk in the family Hygromiidae, the hairy snails and their allies.
