= List of non-marine molluscs of Switzerland =

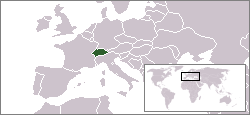
Location of Switzerland

The non-marine molluscs of Switzerland are a part of the molluscan fauna of Switzerland. Switzerland is land-locked and therefore it has no marine molluscs, only land and freshwater species.

== Freshwater gastropods ==
Hydrobiidae

- Bythiospeum alpinum
- Neohoratia minuta

== Land gastropods ==
Pupillidae

- Pupilla bigranata (Rossmässler, 1839)
- Pupilla triplicata (Studer, 1820)

Agriolimacidae

- Deroceras juranum Wüthrich, 1993

Milacidae

- Tandonia nigra

Hygromiidae

- Trochulus biconicus
- Trochulus caelatus

Helicidae

== See also ==
Lists of molluscs of surrounding countries:

- List of non-marine molluscs of Germany
- List of non-marine molluscs of Metropolitan France
- List of non-marine molluscs of Italy
- List of non-marine molluscs of Austria
