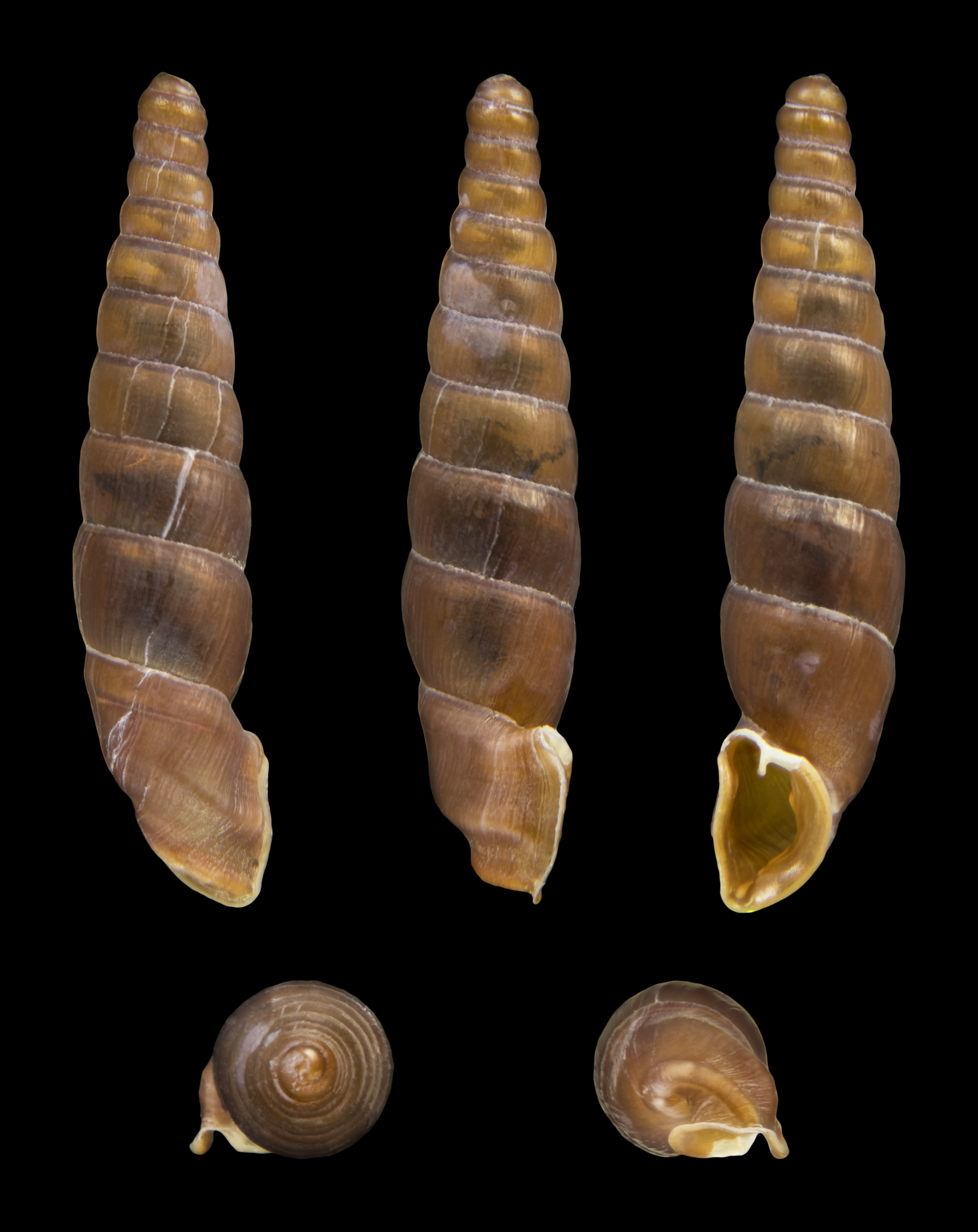

Scientific classification
- Kingdom: Animalia
- Phylum: Mollusca
- Class: Gastropoda
- Order: Stylommatophora
- Family: Clausiliidae
- Genus: Erjavecia; Brusina, 1870
- Species: E. bergeri

Binomial name
- Erjavecia bergeri (Rossmässler, 1836)

= Erjavecia =

Genus of gastropods

Erjavecia is a monotypic genus of gastropods belonging to the family Clausiliidae. The only species is Erjavecia bergeri.

The species is found in near Alps.
