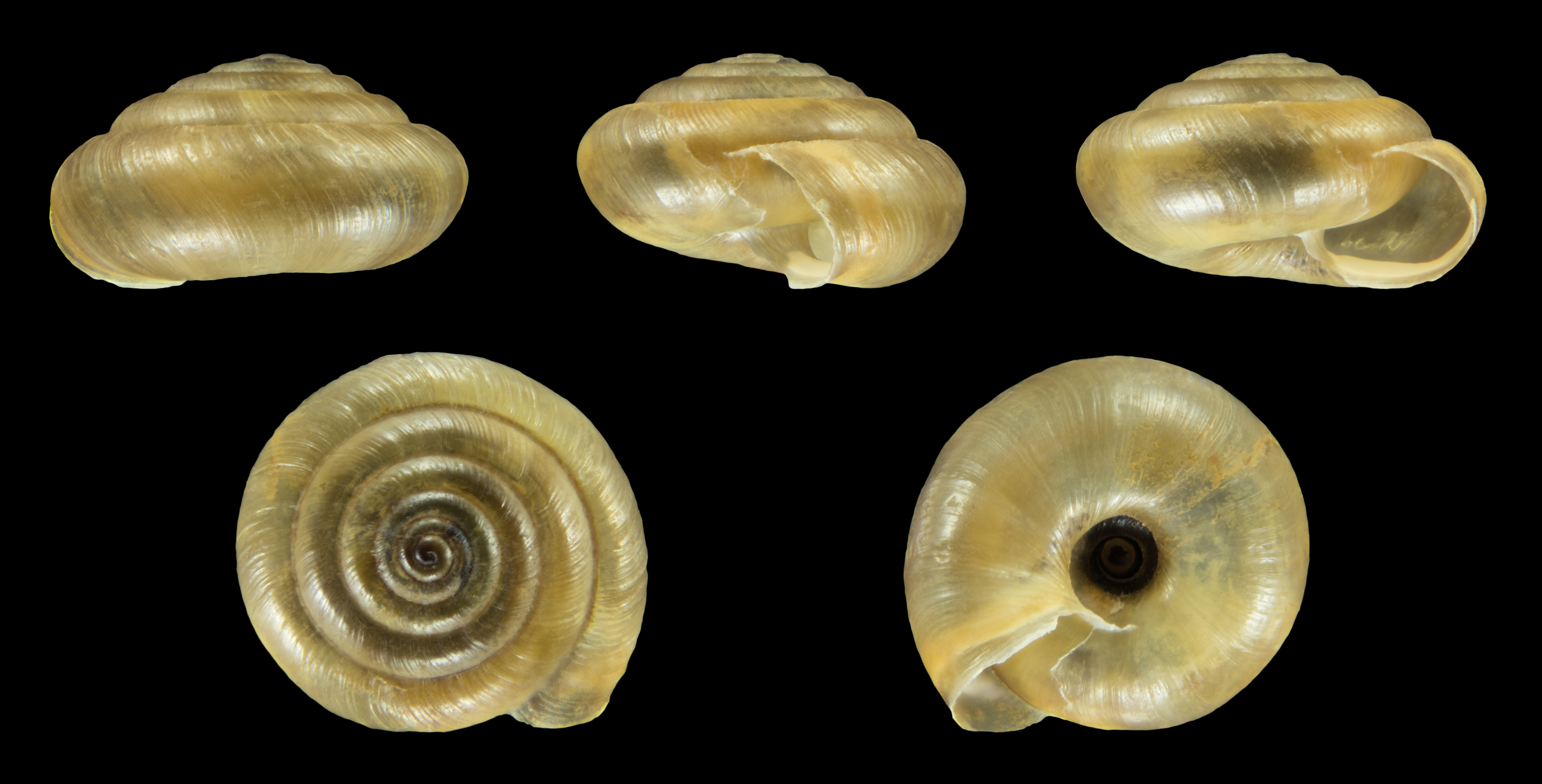

Conservation status
- Secure (NatureServe)

Scientific classification
- Kingdom: Animalia
- Phylum: Mollusca
- Class: Gastropoda
- Order: Stylommatophora
- Family: Hygromiidae
- Genus: Trochulus
- Species: T. striolatus

Binomial name
- Trochulus striolatus (Pfeiffer, 1828)

Synonyms
- Trichia striolata

= Trochulus striolatus =

Species of gastropod

Trochulus striolatus, previously known as Trichia striolata, common name the "strawberry snail," is a species of tiny, air-breathing land snail, a terrestrial pulmonate gastropod mollusk in the family Hygromiidae. This species of snail uses love darts before mating.

== Description ==
The round 10–15 mm. shell has a depressed, low, conical spire. The whorls are convex, with relatively deep sutures, while the last one is angled on the periphery. The colour is whitish to yellowish-brown or reddish-brown, having irregular growth lines and often a pale band on the angled periphery. The adult shell is hairless but bears scattered coarse hair when juvenile.

== Distribution ==
This snail is native to northwestern Europe, occurring in:

- British Isles: Great Britain and Ireland
- Netherlands
- Slovakia

The distribution of the subspecies Trochulus striolatus danubialis is Danubian.
