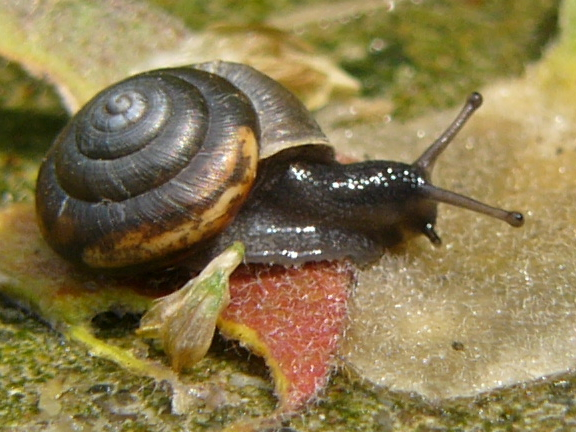
- A live individual of Trochulus hispidus (an older adult with most of the hairs worn off of the shell)
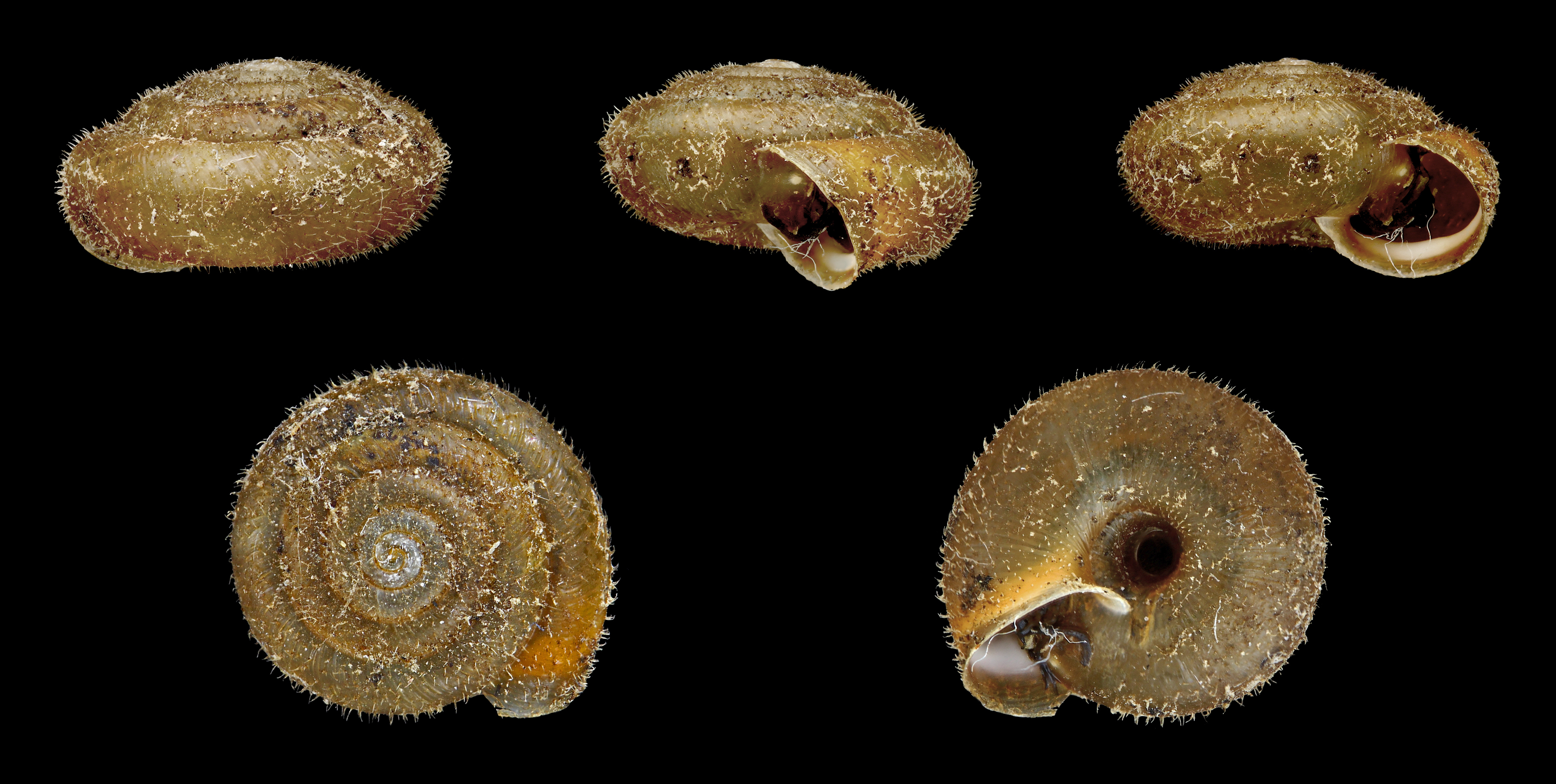
- Five views of a shell of Trochulus hispidus

Conservation status
- Least Concern (IUCN 3.1)

- Secure (NatureServe)

Scientific classification
- Kingdom: Animalia
- Phylum: Mollusca
- Class: Gastropoda
- Order: Stylommatophora
- Family: Hygromiidae
- Genus: Trochulus
- Species: T. hispidus

Binomial name
- Trochulus hispidus (Linnaeus, 1758)

Synonyms
- Trichia hispida (Linnaeus, 1758); Trochulus sericeus (O. F. Müller, 1774); Trochulus plebeius (Draparnaud, 1805); Helix sericea O. F. Müller, 1774

= Trochulus hispidus =

Species of gastropod

Trochulus hispidus, previously known as Trichia hispida, common name, the "hairy snail", is a species of air-breathing land snail, a terrestrial pulmonate gastropod mollusk in the family Hygromiidae, the hairy snails and their allies.

== Distribution ==
This species occurs in a number of European countries and islands including:

Western Europe:

- The British Isles: Great Britain and Ireland
- Netherlands, Belgium, Luxembourg
- Faroe Islands
- France
- Switzerland, Liechtenstein

Northern Europe:

- Denmark, Norway, Sweden, Finland

Central Europe:

- Austria, Germany, Czech Republic, Poland, Slovakia, Hungary, Romania

Southern Europe:

- Andorra, Spain, Italy, Bulgaria

Eastern Europe:

- Moldova
- Estonia, Latvia, Lithuania
- Ukraine
- Russian Federation (Kaliningrad)

== Description ==
The 3-6 x 5-11 mm shell has 5-6 moderately convex whorls which are rounded or very slightly keeled at the periphery. The aperture has a thin white lip inside. The umbilicus is open and usually wide at 1/8-1/4 of shell diameter. In colour the shell is brown to cream, sometimes with a light band at the periphery. The periostracum is irregularly striated, and densely covered with short (0.2-0.3 mm), curved hairs. These hairs usually remain in the umbilicus if worn away from the rest of the shell. Lost hairs leave pronounced scars.

The animal is brownish grey with a darker anterior part.

== Anatomy ==
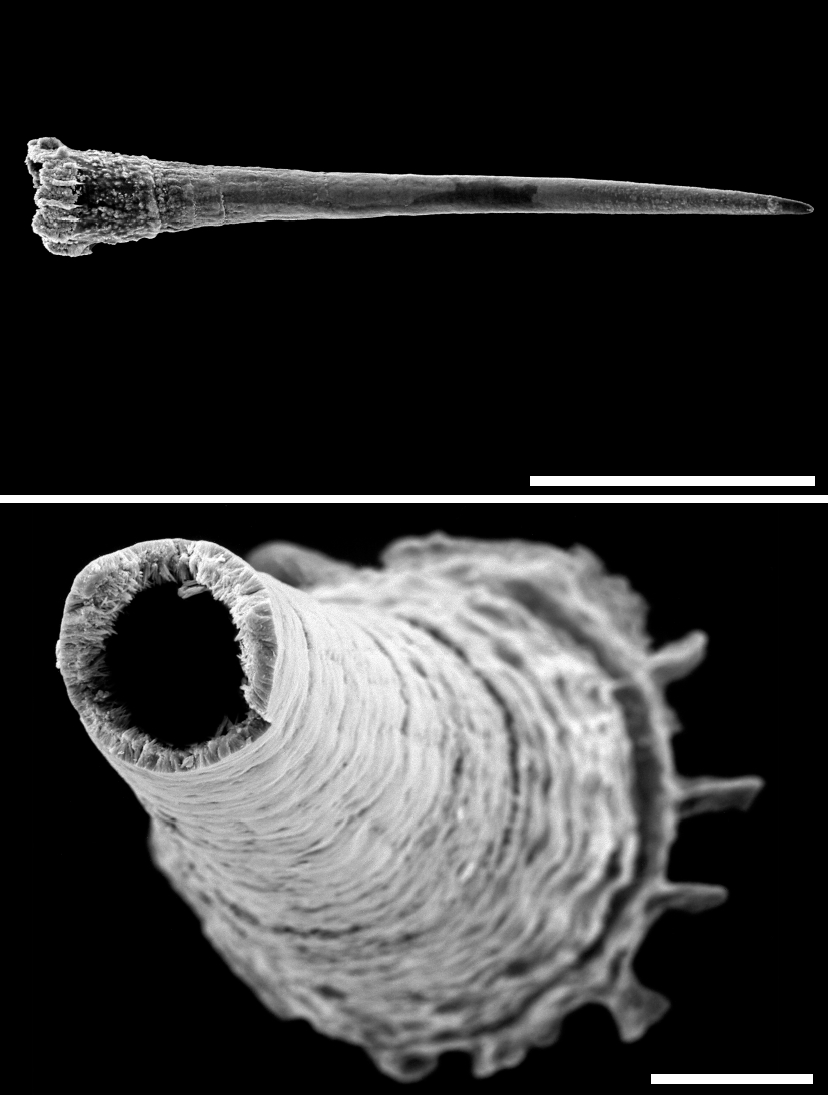
Scanning electron micrograph of the love dart of Trochulus hispidus, Upper image is lateral view - scale bar 500 μm (0.5 mm). Lower image is a cross-section near the base - scale bar 50 μm.

This species of snail creates and uses love darts before mating. The love dart of this species is thorn-shaped.

Shepeleva (2014) studied eyes of Trochulus hispidus.

== Ecology ==
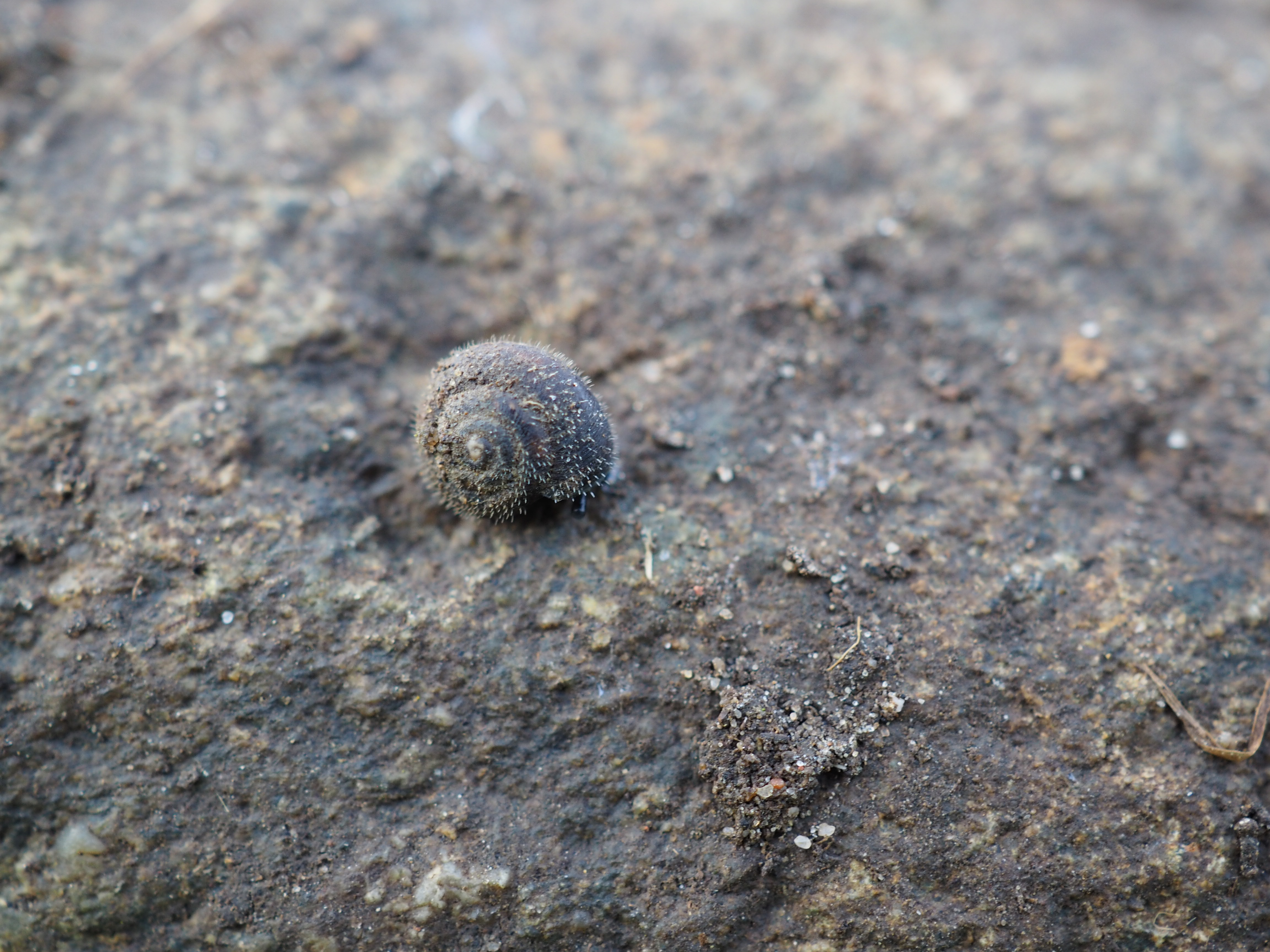
A hairy snail on a rock. It has hardly lost any hairs, still very hairy, indicating youth.

The size of the egg is 1.5 mm.

A hairy snail was found in the plumage of a great tit (Parus major) wintering in southwestern Poland in 2010. This passerine was the smallest bird species reported to carry a gastropod.
