= Xerocampylaea erjaveci =

Conservation status
- Least Concern (IUCN 3.1)

Scientific classification
- Kingdom: Animalia
- Phylum: Mollusca
- Class: Gastropoda
- Order: Stylommatophora
- Family: Hygromiidae
- Genus: Xerocampylaea
- Species: X. erjaveci

Binomial name
- Xerocampylaea erjaveci (Brusina, 1870)

Synonyms
- Trichia erjaveci; Trochulus erjaveci

Species of gastropod

Xerocampylaea erjaveci is a species of air-breathing land snail, a pulmonate gastropod mollusk in the family Hygromiidae, the hairy snails and their allies. It was for long time seen as a member of the genus Trochulus, but moved to the genus Xerocampylaea after more comprehensive research.
