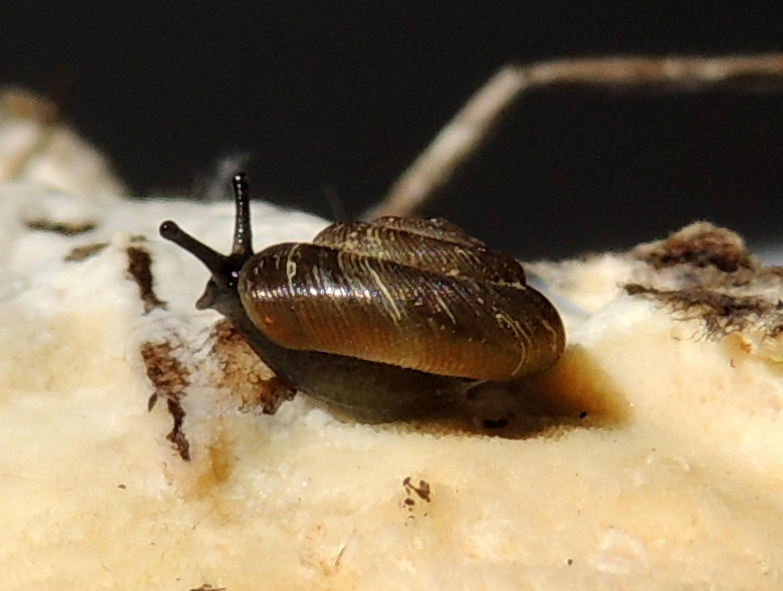

Scientific classification
- Kingdom: Animalia
- Phylum: Mollusca
- Class: Gastropoda
- Order: Stylommatophora
- Family: Discidae
- Genus: Discus
- Species: D. ruderatus

Binomial name
- Discus ruderatus (Hartmann, 1821)
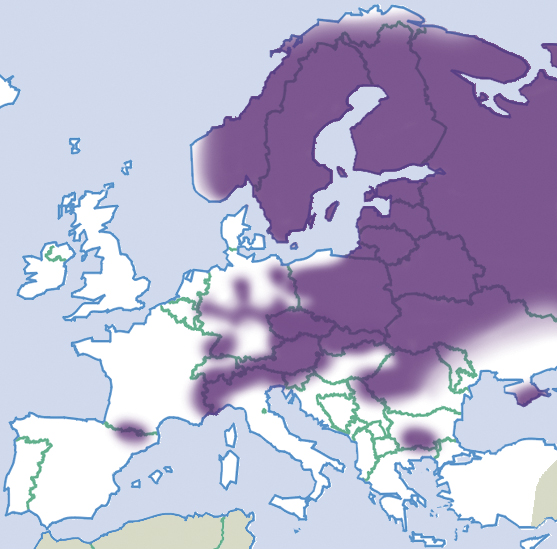

= Discus ruderatus =

Species of gastropod

Discus ruderatus is a species of air-breathing land snail, a terrestrial pulmonate gastropod mollusk in the family Discidae, the disk snails.

== Distribution ==
This species occurs in:

- Czech Republic
- Ukraine
