= Johann Daniel Wilhelm Hartmann =

Swiss painter, engraver and malacologist

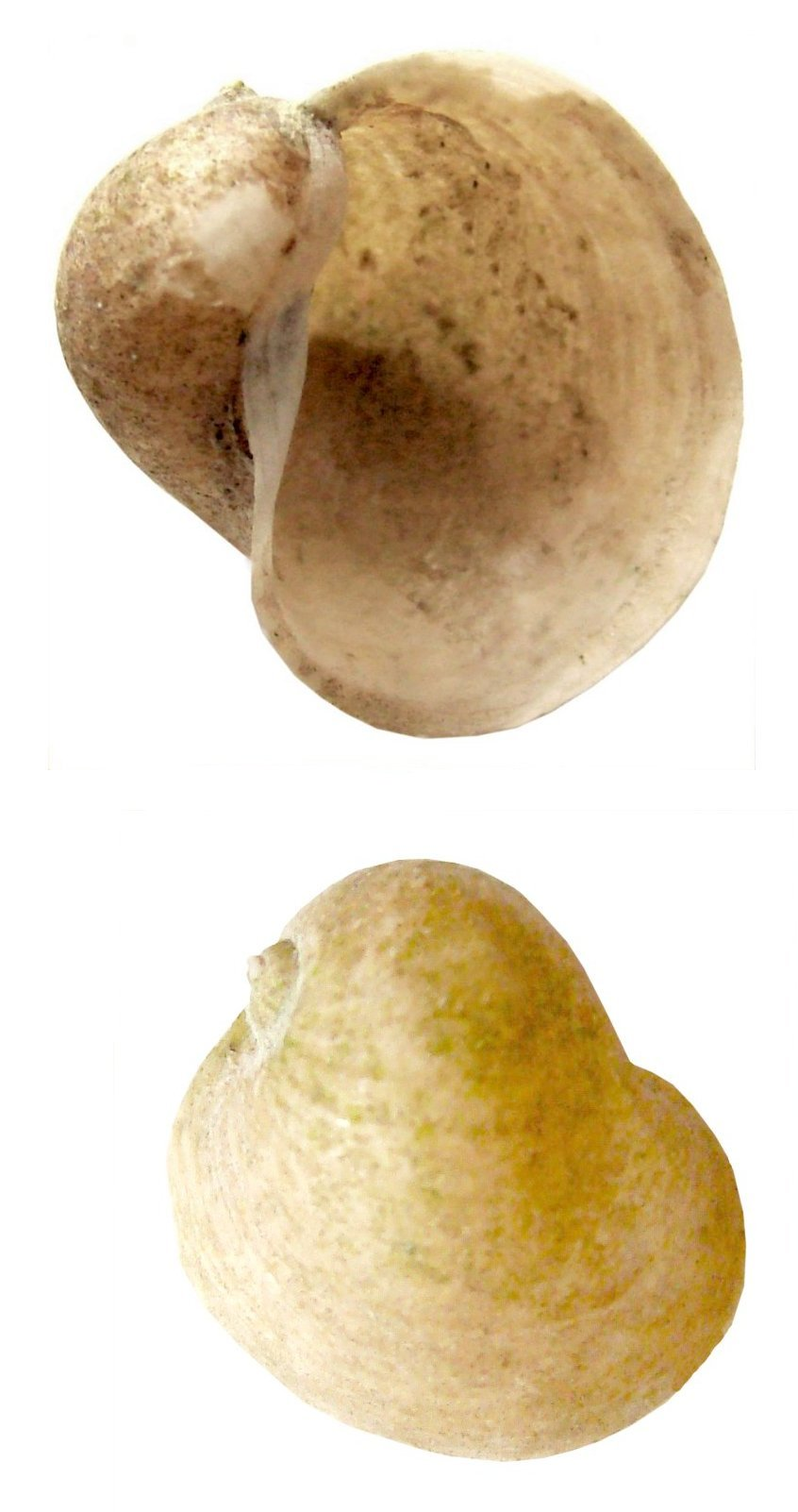
Ampullaceana ampla, a mollusc described by Hartmann

Johann Daniel Wilhelm Hartmann (12 January 1793 – 18 April 1862) was a Swiss painter, engraver and malacologist.

== Biography ==
He was born in St. Gallen, the son of Georg Leonhard Hartmann (1764-1828), who was also a painter. After training in fine arts with his father in Zurich, Munich and Bern, he worked in St. Gallen from 1826 as a naturalist and miniature painter, heraldist and genealogist.

Taxa described by Hartmann include Discus ruderatus, Ampullaceana ampla, Trochulus clandestinus, Bythiospeum acicula, Papillifera and others.

== Works ==
- Hartmann, J. D. W. 1821. System der Erd- und Süsswasser-Gasteropoden Europa's: in besonderer Hinsicht auf diejenigen Gattungen, welche in Deutschland und der Schweitz angetroffen werden. Nürnberg, Jacob Sturm, 1821
- Hartmann, J. D. W. 1844. Erd- und Süsswasser-Gasteropoden der Schweiz. Mit Zugabe einiger merkwürdigen exotischen Arten. I. Band. - pp. i-xx [= 1-20], 1–227, Tab. I-XII [= 1-12], I-XII [sic, = 13-24], 25–84. St. Gallen. (Scheitlin & Zollikofer).Archive

== Sources ==
- Mayer, Marcel (2006). "Hartmann, Johann Daniel Wilhelm". Historisches Lexikon der Schweiz (HLS) [Historical Dictionary of Switzerland].
- B. B. Woodward, 1906: On the dates of publication of J. D. Wilhelm Hartmann's "Erd- und Süsswasser-Gastropoden", St. Gallen, 1840. Proceedings of the Malacological Society of London 7, 1906
- D. Heppell,1966: The dates of publication of J. D. W. Hartmann's "Erd- und Süsswasser-Gasteropoden". Journal of Conchology 26, 1966 84–88
