= Trochulus clandestinus =

Scientific classification
- Kingdom: Animalia
- Phylum: Mollusca
- Class: Gastropoda
- Order: Stylommatophora
- Family: Hygromiidae
- Genus: Trochulus
- Species: T. clandestinus

Binomial name
- Trochulus clandestinus (Hartmann, 1821)

Synonyms
- Helix corrugata var. clandestina Hartmann, 1821; Trichia clandestinus (Hartmann, 1821)

Species of gastropod

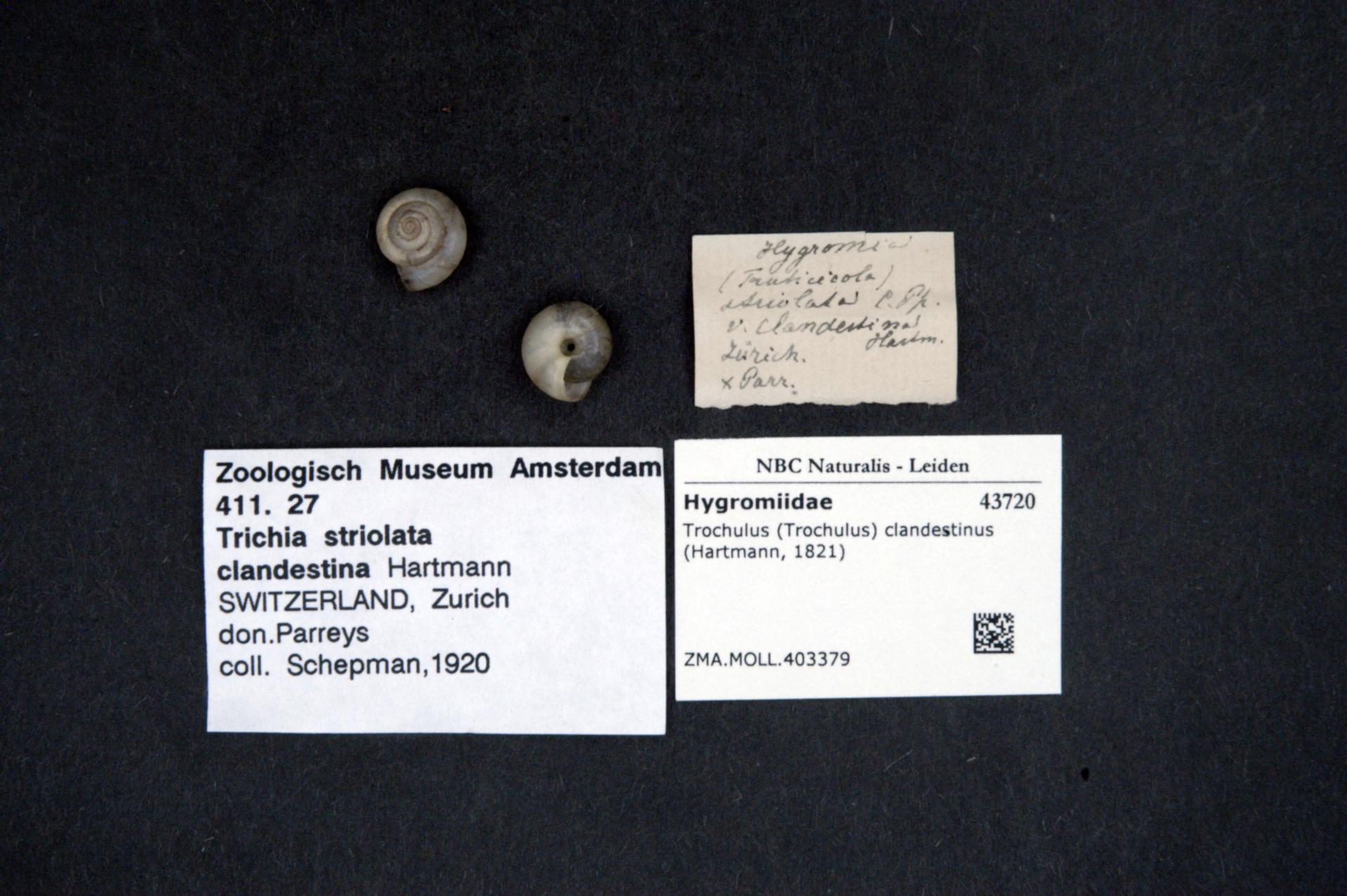
Shells of Trochulus clandestinus.

Trochulus clandestinus is a species of air-breathing land snail, a pulmonate gastropod mollusk in the family Hygromiidae, the hairy snails and their allies.

Distribution of Trochulus clandestinus includes Austria.
