= Trochulus alpicola =

Conservation status
- Data Deficient (IUCN 3.1)

Scientific classification
- Kingdom: Animalia
- Phylum: Mollusca
- Class: Gastropoda
- Order: Stylommatophora
- Family: Hygromiidae
- Genus: Trochulus
- Species: T. alpicola

Binomial name
- Trochulus alpicola (Eder, 1921)

Synonyms
- Trichia alpicola

Species of gastropod

Trochulus alpicola is a species of air-breathing land snail, a pulmonate gastropod mollusk in the family Hygromiidae, the hairy snails and their allies.
