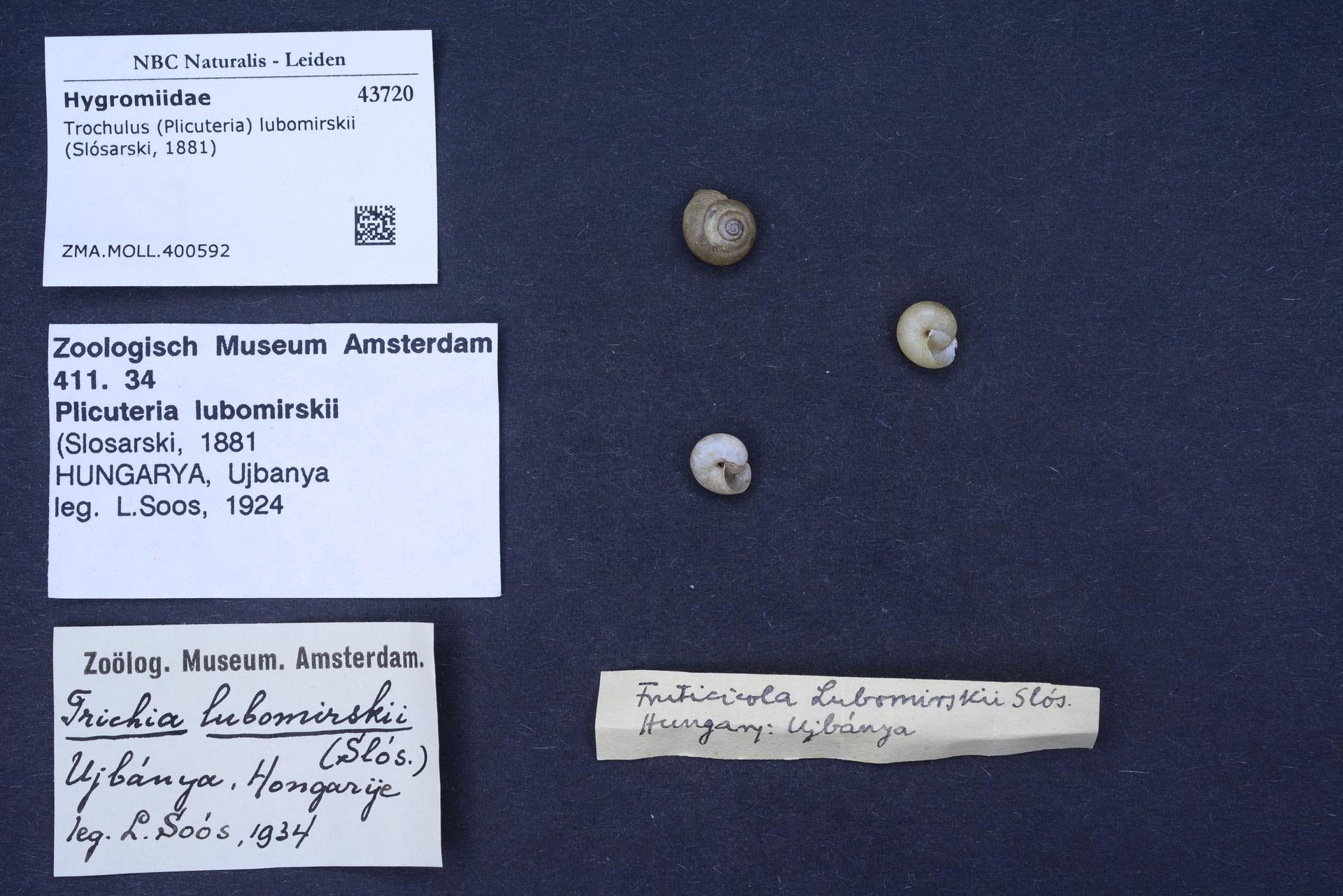
- Plicuteria lubomirski shells

Conservation status
- Least Concern (IUCN 3.1)

Scientific classification
- Kingdom: Animalia
- Phylum: Mollusca
- Class: Gastropoda
- Order: Stylommatophora
- Family: Hygromiidae
- Subfamily: Trochulininae
- Tribe: Urticicolini
- Genus: Plicuteria; Schileyko, 1978
- Species: P. lubomirskii

Binomial name
- Plicuteria lubomirskii (Ślósarski, 1881)

Synonyms
- Helix lubomirskii Ślósarski, 1881; Helix lubomirski Ślósarski, 1881; Plicuteria lubomirskii; Trichia lubomirskii; Trichia lubomirski; Trochulus lubomirski; Trochulus lubomirskii

= Plicuteria =

Genus of gastropods

Plicuteria lubomirskii is a species of air-breathing land snail, a terrestrial pulmonate gastropod mollusk in the family Hygromiidae, the hairy snails and their allies. It is the only species in the genus Plicuteria. The species is named after the Polish nobleman and shell collector Władysław Emanuel Lubomirski.

== Taxonomy ==
The spelling of the name is currently disputed. In the original source the name was spelled Helix (Fruticicola) Lubomirski, to be corrected to lubomirski under the International Code of Zoological Nomenclature. Later many authors spelled the name lubomirskii, but some other authors used the spelling lubomirski. The 4th edition of the Code (effective since 2000) gives no clear ruling (previous editions of the Code had a clear ruling that lubomirski was the correct form), so this case will remain disputed.

Schileyko (1978) placed this species in the subgenus Plicuteria Schileyko, 1978. However, based on molecular analyses, this species may not actually belong in the genus Trochulus.

== Distribution ==
This species is known to occur in:

- Ukraine
