= Spiridon Brusina =

Austro-Hungarian malacologist

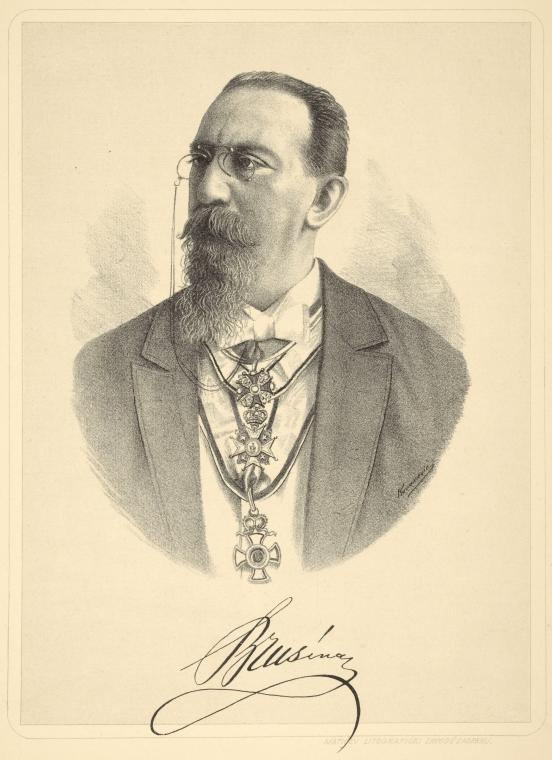
- 1898 portrait of Spiridon Brusina
- Born: 11 December 1845; Zara, Dalmatia, Austrian Empire
- Died: 21 May 1909 (aged 63); Zagreb, Croatia-Slavonia, Austria-Hungary
- Scientific career
- Fields: malacology

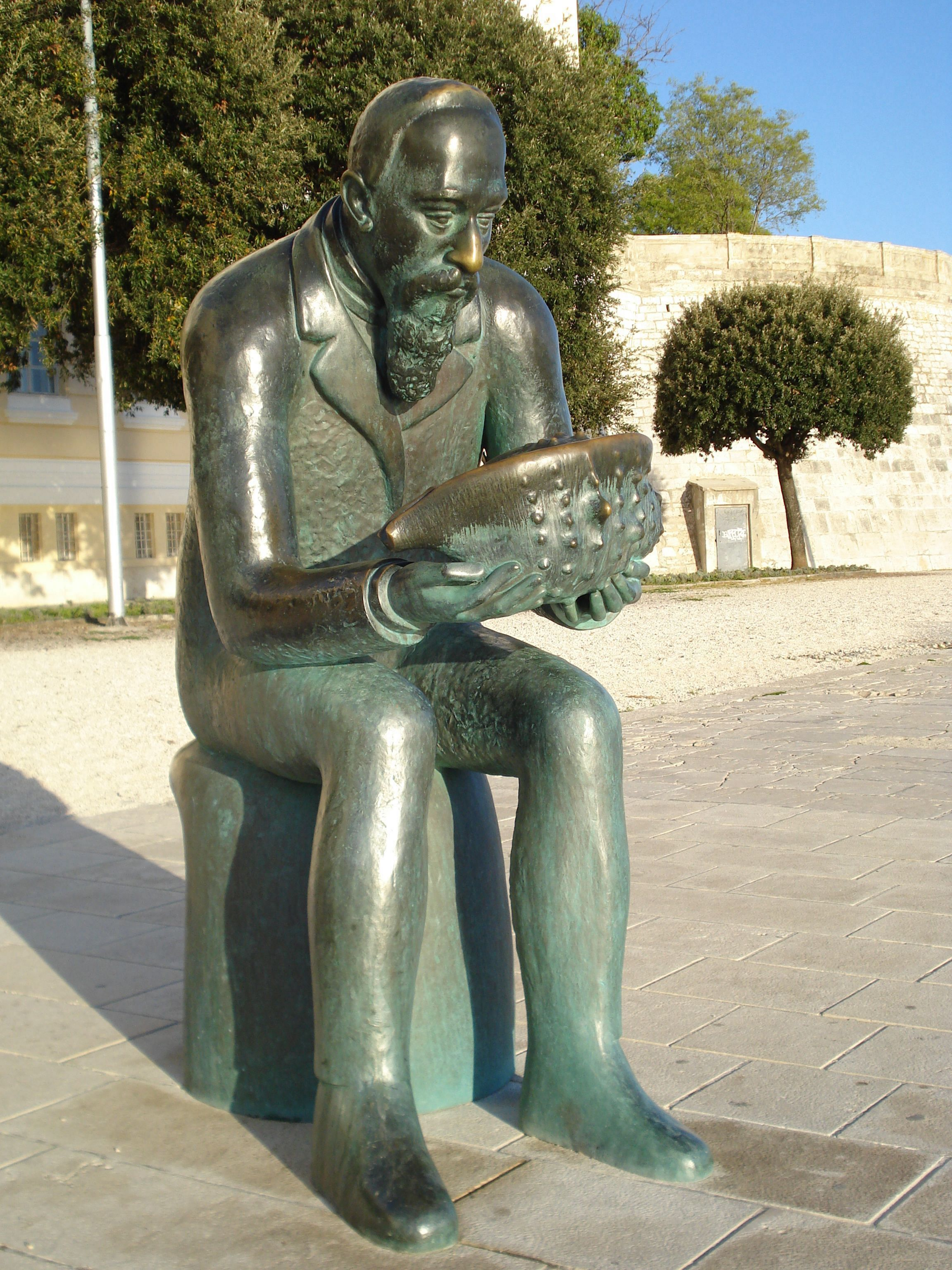
Sculpture of Spiridon Brusina in Zadar

Spiridon Brusina (11 December 1845 – 21 May 1909) was a Croatian malacologist.

Together with Oton Kučera and Gjuro Pilar, he founded the Croatian Society of Natural Sciences in Zagreb in the late 1885.

== Taxa described ==
- Drobacia Brusina, 1904
- Emmericia Brusina, 1870
- Erjavecia Brusina, 1870
- Manzonia Brusina, 1870
- Spelaeodiscus Brusina, 1886
- Vidovicia Brusina, 1904
- Trochulus erjaveci (Brusina, 1870)

== Bibliography ==
- Brusina S. (1865). "Conchiglie Dalmate Inedite", Wien
- Brusina S. (1866). "Contribuzione pella fauna dei molluschi Dalmati". Wien
- Brusina S. (1869)."Gasteropodes noveaux de l'Adriatique" in J. de Conchyl. XVII
- Brusina S. (1870)."Principi Malacologici", Zagreb
- Brusina S. (1870). Ipsa Chierrenghinii Conchiglie, Pisa
- Brusina S. (1870). "Saggio della Malacologia Adriatica" in Boll. Soc. Malac. Ital. VI
- Brusina S. (1870). "Monographie der Gattungen Emmericia und Fossarulus". Verhandlungen der kaiserlich-königlichen Zoologisch-Botanischen Gesellschaft in Wien 20: 925–938.
- Brusina S. (1872). "Saggio secundo della Malacologia Adriatica", Ebenda
- Brusina S. (1886). "Ueber die Mollusken-Fauna Oesterreich-Ungarns". Mittheilungen des Naturwissenschaftlichen Vereins für Steiermark 22(1885): 29–56. Graz.
- Brusina S. (1904). "Zur Rettung unserer Mollusken-Fauna". Nachrichtsblatt der Deutschen Malakozoologischen Gesellschaft 36: 157-168.
