= Jacques Draparnaud =

French naturalist, malacologist and botanist (1772–1804)

Jacques Philippe Raymond Draparnaud
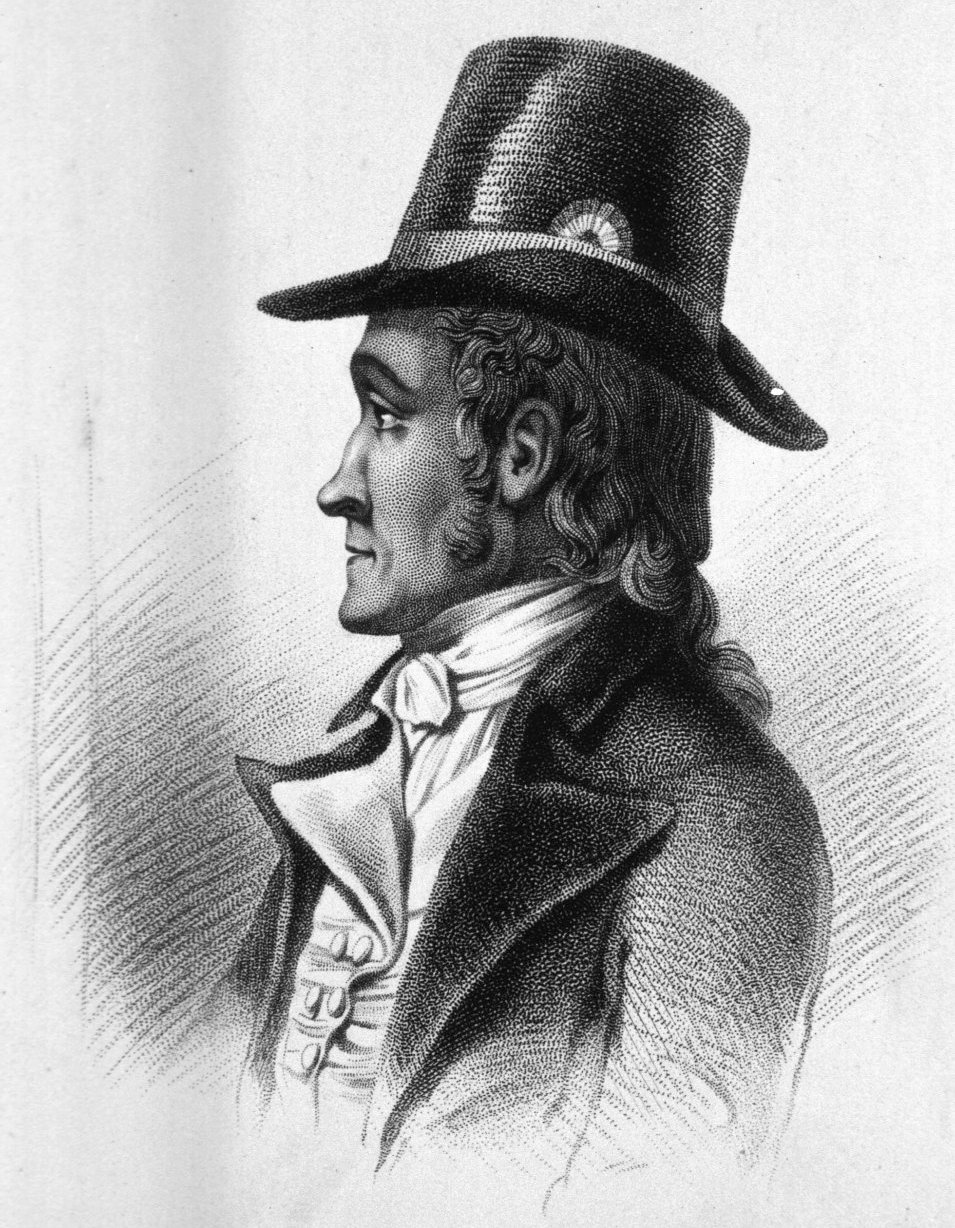
- Engraving of Draparnaud
- Born: 3 June 1772; Montpelier, France
- Died: 4 February 1804 (aged 31); Montpelier, France
- Scientific career
- Fields: malacology, botany
- Workplaces: Faculté de Médecine de Montpellier

Jacques Philippe Raymond Draparnaud (3 June 1772, Montpellier – 2 February 1804) was a French naturalist, malacologist and botanist. He is considered the father of malacology in France. He was professor of medicine and pathology at the Faculté de Médecine de Montpellier.

Draparnaud understood the breadth of the fauna he studied, as can be seen in a quote from him, in Histoire Naturelle des Mollusques, published in 1805:

Au reste, quoique j'aie décrit pour la France seule un bien plus grand nombre d'espèces que Muller et Schroeter n'ent ont fait connoître pour l'Europe entière, et trois fois autant que Geoffroy et Poiret n'en ont observé dans les environs de Paris, je suis convaincu qu'il reste encore en ce genre bien des découvertes à faire.

Translation:

As for the remainder, even though I have described for France a greater number of species than Müller and Schroeter made known for the whole of Europe, and three times as many as Geoffroy and Poiret observed around Paris, still I am convinced that there remain many more discoveries of this kind to be made.

== Taxa ==
Draparnaud named ("described") a large number of new taxa of molluscs, including for example:

- Arion subfuscus (Draparnaud, 1805), a land slug
- Bulimulus lineatus (Draparnaud, 1805), a tropical land snail
- Myosotella myosotis (Draparnaud, 1801), a saltmarsh snail

In addition, many other taxa were named by others in honour of him, including:

- Draparnaldia, a genus of freshwater green algae in the family Chaetophoraceae.
- Draparnaldiopsis, a genus of green algae in the family Chaetophoraceae.
- Draparnaudia, a genus of land snails, which has in turn given its name to the family Draparnaudiidae
- Oxychilus draparnaudi, a species of land snail

== Works ==
- 1794 (an II). Observations sur le Mantis oratoria. Bulletin de la Société philomatique de Paris, III, p. 161.
- 1797 (an V). Note sur l'Agaricus radiosus. Journal de Santé et d'Histoire naturelle de Bordeaux, I, n° 8, 25 floréal an V, p. 145-149.
- 1797 (an V). Théorie de l'origine et de la formation des Egagropiles de mer. Journal de Santé et d'Histoire naturelle de Bordeaux, I, n°2, 25 pluviose an V, p. 21-27.
- 1797 (an V). Observations sur l'Helix algira. Journal de Santé et d'Histoire naturelle de Bordeaux, I, an V, p. 98.
- 1797 (an V). Réponse aux observations du citoyen Guérin sur la théorie des Egagropiles de mer. Journal de Santé et d'Histoire naturelle de Bordeaux, I, n° 10, 25 prairial an V, p. 173-180.
- 1799 (an VII). Observations sur le mouvement giratoire des molécules du Camphre. Journal de Santé et d'Histoire naturelle de Bordeaux, III, an VII, p. 264.
- 1799 (an VII). Propositions générales et observations relatives à diverses branches de la médecine. Thèse soutenue le 12 germinal an VII.
- 1799 (an VII). Fragments de la physiologie végétale. Deuxième thèse soutenue le 1^{er} messidor an VII.
- 1800 (an VIII). Aperçus de la philosophie médicale. Troisième thèse, soutenue le 22 messidor an VIII.
- 1800 (an VIII). Observations sur la Gioenia. Bulletin de la Société philomatique de Paris, II, p. 113-114; Millin, Mag. encycl., V, 5, 1800, p. 378-379; Journ. phys., LVI, 1800, p. 146-147.
- 1801 (an IX). Fragments pour servir à l'Histoire des progrès en médecine dans l'Université de Montpellier. Quatrième thèse, soutenue le 18 ventôse an IX.
- 1801 (an IX). Observations sur la Bulla Hydatis. Millin, Mag. Encycl., VI, 1, p. 115-116.
- 1801 (an IX). Observations sur l'Alcyonum domuncula. Bulletin de la Société philomatique de Paris, p. 167-170.
- 1801 (an IX). Dissertation sur l'utilité de l'Histoire naturelle dans la médecine, présentée à l'École de médecine de Montpellier. Montpellier, 61 p.
- 1801 (an IX). Discours relatif à l'Histoire naturelle de Montpellier. Montpellier, 41 p.
- 1801 (an IX). Discours sur les avantages de l'Histoire naturelle, et discours sur les mœurs et la manière de vivre des plantes. Montpellier, 61 p.
- 1801 (an IX). Tableau des Mollusques terrestres et fluviatiles de la France. Montpellier et Paris, 116 p.
- 1802 (an X). Essai de pathologie végétale. Discours lu le 30 vendémiaire an X (1802) à la séance publique de la Société d'Agriculture.
- 1802 (an X). Discours sur la vie et les fonctions, ou précis de la physiologie comparative. Montpellier.
- 1802 (an X). Discours sur la philosophie des Sciences. Montpellier.
- 1802 (an X). Sur le glauque de certains végétaux. Journ. phys., LVI, p. 112.
- 1803 (an XI). Dissertation sur l'utilité de l'Histoire naturelle en médecine. Montpellier.
- 1803 (an XI). Mémoire sur la reproduction considérée dans les divers corps organiques. Recueil des Bulletins de Montpellier, I, p. 3-8.
- 1803 (an XI). Observations sur la Lime. Recueil des Bulletins de Montpellier, I, p. 52-54.
- 1803 (an XI). Mémoire sur les organes du chant des Insectes. Recueil des Bulletins de Montpellier, I, p. 55-61.
- 1803 (an XI). Mémoire sur l'Insecte qui a dévasté, en l'an X, les vignes des communes de Marseillan et de Florensac. Recueil des Bulletins de Montpellier, I, p. 86-91.
- 1803 (an XI). Observations sur le passage des couleurs des coquilles à la couleur bleue. Recueil des Bulletins de Montpellier, I, p. 162-163.
- 1803 (an XI). Fragment d'un essai sur la pathologie végétale. Recueil des Bulletins de Montpellier, I, p. 174-185.
- 1803 (an XI). Notice minéralogique sur Montferrier. Recueil des Bulletins de Montpellier, I, p. 353-359.
- 1803 (an XI). Observations sur la formation et la cristallisation sous-marines du spath calcaire. Recueil des Bulletins de Montpellier, I, p. 359-361 et Journ. phys., LVII, p. 174-180.
- 1803 (an XI). Sur les mouvements que certains fluides reçoivent par le contact d'autres fluides. Annales de la chimie, XLVII, p. 303-311; Gilbert Ann., XXIV, p. 130-134; Nikolson Journ., VIII, p. 201-204.
- 1805 (an XIII). Histoire naturelle des Mollusques terrestres et fluviatiles de la France. Paris, 164 p., 13 pl. [ouvrage posthume]
- Specimen florae soricianae
- Observationes agrostographicae
- Observationes muscologicae
- Algarum species novae
- Nova plantarum Lichenosarum methodus microscopico-analytica
- Prodromus Historiae confervarum
- Compendium Historiae naturalis Monspeliensis
- Flora Monspeliensis
- Bibliotheca universalis Historiae naturalis

== Bibliography ==
- Jean-Jacques Amigo, « Draparnaud (Jacques, Philippe, Raymond) », in Nouveau Dictionnaire de biographies roussillonnaises, vol. 3 Sciences de la Vie et de la Terre, Perpignan, Publications de l'olivier, 2017, 915 p. (ISBN 9782908866506)
