= List of non-marine molluscs of Austria =

Location of Austria

The non-marine molluscs of Austria are a part of the fauna of Austria. Austria is land-locked and therefore it has no marine molluscs, only land and freshwater species. This list is based on the current Red List of Austrian molluscs.

There are 443 species of non-marine molluscs living in Austria. Of these, 426 species live in the wild, 60 of which are endemic to Austria. At least 17 gastropod species live only as hothouse aliens in greenhouses, aquaria and terraria. Another 4 non-indigenous species occur only in hot springs.

== Freshwater gastropods ==
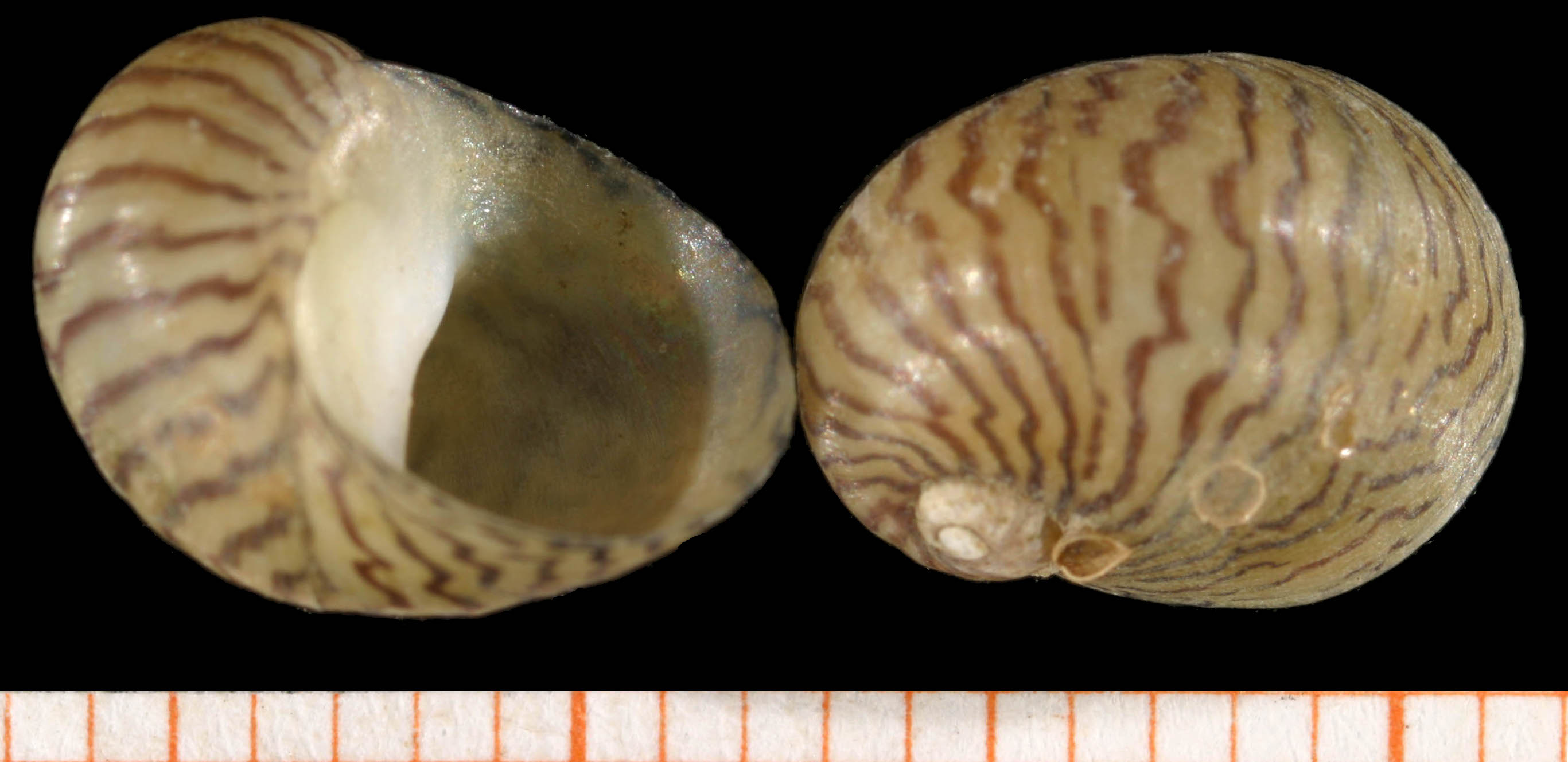
Shells of Theodoxus danubialis, a once widespread species in the east of Austria

Neritidae

- Theodoxus danubialis
  - Theodoxus danubialis danubialis (C. Pfeiffer, 1828)
  - Theodoxus danubialis stragulatus (C. Pfeiffer, 1828)
- Theodoxus fluviatilis (Linnaeus, 1758) – non-indigenous, along the danube in Upper and Lower Austria and Vienna, first record 2001
- Theodoxus prevostianus (C. Pfeiffer, 1828)
- Theodoxus transversalis (C. Pfeiffer, 1828) - striped nerite

Viviparidae

- Viviparus acerosus (Bourguignat, 1862)
- Viviparus contectus (Millet, 1813)

Melanopsidae

- Microcolpia daudebartii
  - Microcolpia daudebartii daudebartii (Prevost, 1821)
  - Microcolpia daudepartii acicularis (A. Ferrusac, 1823)
- Esperiana esperi (A. Ferrusac, 1823) – extinct
- Holandriana holandrii (C. Pfeiffer, 1828)

Hydrobiidae

- Alzoniella hartwigschuetti (Reischütz, 1983)
- Belgrandiella austriana (Radoman, 1975) – endemic
- Belgrandiella aulaei Haase, Weigand & Haseke, 2000 – endemic
- Belgrandiella boetersi Reischütz & Falkner, 1998 – endemic
- Belgrandiella fuchsi (Boeters, 1970) – endemic
- Belgrandiella ganslmayri Haase, 1993 – endemic
- Belgrandiella kreisslorum Reischütz, 1997 – endemic, extinct.
- Belgrandiella mimula Haase, 1996 – endemic
- Belgrandiella multiformis Fischer & Reischütz, 1995 – endemic
- Belgrandiella parreyssii (L. Pfeiffer, 1841)- endemic
- Belgrandiella pelerei Haase, 1994 – endemic
- Belgrandiella styriaca Stojaspal, 1978– endemic
- Belgrandiella wawrai Haase, 1996 – endemic
- Bythinella austriaca
  - Bythinella austriaca austriaca (Frauenfeld, 1857)
  - Bythinella austriaca conica (Clessin, 1910)
- Bythinella cylindrica (Frauenfeld, 1857) – endemic
- Bythinella bavarica (Clessin, 1877)
- Bythinella lunzensis (Boeters, 2008)
- Bythinella opaca (M. v. Gallenstein, 1848)
- Bythiospeum bormanni (Stojaspal, 1978) – endemic
- Bythiospeum elseri (Fuchs, 1929) – endemic
- Bythiospeum excelsior (Mahler, 1950) – endemic
- Bythiospeum excessum (Mahler, 1950) – endemic
- Bythiospeum cisterciensorum (Reischütz, 1983) – endemic
- Bythiospeum geyeri (Fuchs, 1929) – endemic
- Bythiospeum nocki Haase, Weigand & Haseke, 2000 – endemic
- Bythiospeum noricum (Fuchs, 1929) – endemic
- Bythiospeum pfeifferi (Clessin, 1890) – endemic, extinct.
- Bythiospeum reisalpense (Reischütz, 1983) – endemic
- Bythiospeum tschapecki (Clessin, 1882) – endemic
- Bythiospeum wiaaiglica A. Reischütz & P.L. Reischütz, 2006 – endemic, extinct
- Graziana adlitzensis Fischer & Reischütz, 1995 – endemic
- Graziana klagenfurtensis Haase, 1994 – endemic
- Graziana lacheineri (Küster, 1853)
- Graziana pupula (Westerlund, 1886)
- Hauffenia kerschneri
  - Hauffenia kerschneri kerschneri (St. Zimmermann, 1930) – endemic
  - Hauffenia kerschneri loichiana Haase, 1993 – endemic
- Hauffenia nesemanni A. Reischütz & P.L. Reischütz, 2006 – endemic
- Hauffenia wienerwaldensis Haase, 1992 – endemic
- Iglica gratulabunda (A. J. Wagner, 1910) – endemic
- Iglica kleinzellensis Reischütz, 1981 – endemic
- Lithoglyphus naticoides (C. Pfeiffer, 1828)
- Lobaunia danubialis Haase, 1993 – endemic
- Potamopyrgus antipodarum (J. E. Gray, 1853) – non-indigenous - New Zealand mud snail

Amnicolidae

- Marstoniopsis insubrica (Küster, 1853)

Bithyniidae

- Bithynia leachii (Sheppard, 1823)
- Bithynia tentaculata (Linnaeus, 1758)
- Bithynia transsilvanica (E. A. Bielz, 1853)

Valvatidae

- Valvata cristata O. F. Müller, 1774
- Valvata macrostoma Mörch, 1864
- Valvata piscinalis
  - Valvata piscinalis alpestris Küster, 1852
  - Valvata piscinalis antiqua Morris, 1838
  - Valvata piscinalis piscinalis O. F. Müller, 1774
- Valvata studeri Boeters & Falkner, 1998
- Borysthenia naticina (Menke, 1845)

Acroloxidae

- Acroloxus lacustris (Linnaeus, 1758)

Lymnaeidae

- Galba truncatula (O. F. Müller, 1774)
- Stagnicola corvus (Gmelin, 1791)
- Stagnicola fuscus (C. Pfeiffer, 1821)
- Stagnicola palustris s. str. – non-indigenous
- Ampullaceana ampla (Hartmann, 1821)
- Ampullaceana balthica (Linnaeus, 1758)
- Ampullaceana lagotis (Schrank, 1803)
- Radix auricularia (Linnaeus, 1758)
- Lymnaea stagnalis (Linnaeus, 1758)

Physidae

- Aplexa hypnorum (Linnaeus, 1758)
- Physa fontinalis (Linnaeus, 1758)
- Physella acuta (Draparnaud, 1805) – non-indigenous
- Physella gyrina (Say, 1821) – non-indigenous

Planorbidae

- Ancylus fluviatilis O. F. Müller, 1774
- Anisus leucostoma (Millet, 1813)
- Anisus spirorbis (Linnaeus, 1758)
- Anisus vortex (Linnaeus, 1758)
- Anisus vorticulus (Troschel, 1834)
- Armiger crista (Linnaeus, 1758)
- Bathyomphalus contortus (Linnaeus, 1758)
- Ferrissia californica (Tryon, 1863)
- Gyraulus acronicus (A. Ferrusac, 1807)
- Gyraulus albus (O. F. Müller, 1774)
- Gyraulus chinensis (Dunker, 1848) – non-indigenous
- Gyraulus parvus (Say, 1817) – non-indigenous
- Gyraulus rossmaessleri (Auerswald, 1852)
- Hippeutis complanatus (Linnaeus, 1758)
- Planorbarius corneus (Linnaeus, 1758)
- Planorbis planorbis (Linnaeus, 1758)
- Planorbis carinatus O. F. Müller, 1774
- Segmentina nitida (O. F. Müller, 1774)

== Land gastropods ==
Cochlostomatidae

- Cochlostoma anomphale Boeckel, 1939
- Cochlostoma gracile stussineri (A. J. Wagner, 1897)
- Cochlostoma henricae
  - Cochlostoma henricae henricae (Strobel, 1851)
  - Cochlostoma henricae huettneri (A. J. Wagner, 1895)
- Cochlostoma nanum (Westerlund, 1879)
- Cochlostoma septemspirale
  - Cochlostoma septemspirale septemspirale (Razoumovsky, 1789)
  - Cochlostoma septemspirale heydenianum (Clessin, 1789)
- Cochlostoma tergestinum (Westerlund, 1878)
- Cochlostoma waldemari (A. J. Wangner, 1897)

Pomatiidae

- Pomatias elegans (O. F. Müller, 1774)- non-indigenous

Aciculidae

- Acicula lineata (Draparnaud, 1801)

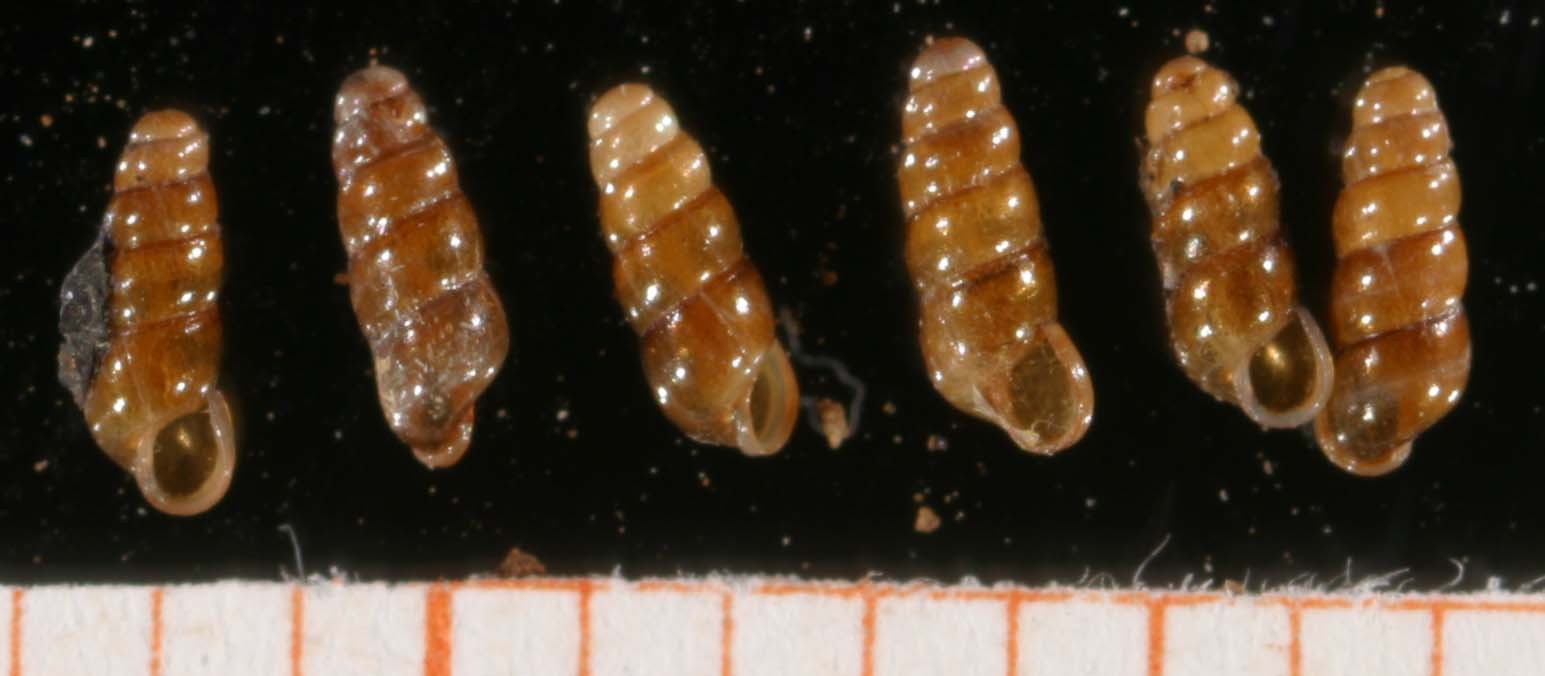
Empty shells of Platyla polita

- Acicula lineolata banki Boeters, Gittenberger & Subai 1993
- Platyla gracilis (Clessin, 1877)
- Platyla polita (Hartmann, 1840)
- Renea veneta (Pirona, 1865)

Carychiidae

- Carychium minimum O. F. Müller, 1774
- Carychium tridentatum (Risso, 1826)
- Zospeum alpestre
  - Zospeum alpestre isselianum (Pollonera, 1886)
  - Zospeum alpestre kupitzense Stummer, 1984

Succineidae

- Succinella oblonga (Draparnaud, 1801)
- Succinea putris (Linné 1758)
- Oxyloma elegans (Risso, 1826)
- Oxyloma sarsii (Esmark, 1886)

Cochlicopidae

- Cochlicopa lubrica (O. F. Müller, 1774)
- Cochlicopa lubricella (Rossmässler, 1834)
- Cochlicopa nitens (M. v. Gallenstein, 1848)

Orculidae

- Odontocyclas kokeilii (Rossmässler, 1837)
- Orcula austriaca – endemic
  - Orcula austriaca austriaca S. Zimmermann, 1932
  - Orcula austriaca faueri Klemm, 1967
  - Orcula austriaca goelleri Gittenberger, 1967
  - Orcula austriaca pseudofuchsi Klemm, 1967
- Orcula conica (Rossmässler, 1837)
- Orcula dolium
  - Orcula dolium dolium (Draparnaud, 1801)
  - Orcula dolium edita Pilsbry, 1934 – endemic
  - Orcula dolium gracilior S. Zimmermann – endemic
  - Orcula dolium infima Pilsbry, 1934 – endemic
  - Orcula dolium pseudogularis A. J. Wagner 1912 – endemic
- Orcula pseudodolium A.J. Wagner, 1912 – endemic
- Orcula fuchsi S. Zimmermann, 1931 – endemic
- Orcula gularis
  - Orcula gularis gularis (Rossmässler, 1837)
  - Orcula gularis oreina Pilsbry, 1934 – endemic
- Orcula restituta (Westerlund, 1887)
- Orcula tolminensis A. J. Wagner, 1912
- Pagodulina pagodula
  - Pagodulina pagodula altilis Klemm, 1939
  - Pagodulina pagodula principalis Klemm, 1939
- Pagodulina sparsa Pilsbry, 1924
- Pagodulina subdola
  - Pagodulina subdola subdola (Gredler, 1856)
  - Pagodulina subdola superstes Klemm, 1939
- Sphyradium doliolum (Bruguiere, 1792)

Argnidae

- Agardhiella truncatella (L. Pfeifer, 1841)
- Argna biplicata excessiva (Gredler, 1856)

Strobilopsidae

- Gittenbergia sororcula (Benoit, 1859)

Valloniidae

- Acanthinula aculeata (O. F. Müller, 1774)
- Vallonia costata (O. F. Müller, 1774)
- Vallonia declivis Sterki, 1893
- Vallonia enniensis (Gredler, 1856)
- Vallonia excentrica Sterki, 1893
- Vallonia pulchella (O. F. Müller, 1774)
- Vallonia suevica geyer, 1908

Pupillidae

- Pupilla alpicola (Charpentier, 1837)
- Pupilla bigranata (Rossmässler, 1839)
- Pupilla muscorum (Linnaeus, 1758)
- Pupilla sterrii (Voith, 1840)
- Pupilla triplicata (Studer, 1820)

Pyramidulidae

- Pyramidula pusilla (Vallot, 1801)

Chondrinidae

- Abida secale (Draparnaud, 1801)
- Chondrina avenacea
  - Chondrina avenacea avenacea (Brugiere, 1792)
  - Chondrina avenacea lepta (Westerlund, 1887)
- Chondrina arcadia clienta (Westerlund, 1883)
- Chondrina megacheilos burtscheri Falkner& Stummer, 1996
- Granaria frumentum (Draparnaud, 1801)
- Granaria illyrica (Rossmässler, 1835)

Vertiginidae

- Columella aspera Waldén, 1966
- Columella columella (G. V. Martens, 1830)
- Columella edentula (Draparnaud, 1805)
- Truncatellina callicratis (Scacchi, 1833)
- Truncatellina claustralis (Gredler, 1856)
- Truncatellina costulata (Nilsson, 1823)
- Truncatellina cylindrica (A. Ferrusac, 1807)
- Truncatellina monodon (Held 1837)
- Vertigo alpestris Alder, 1838

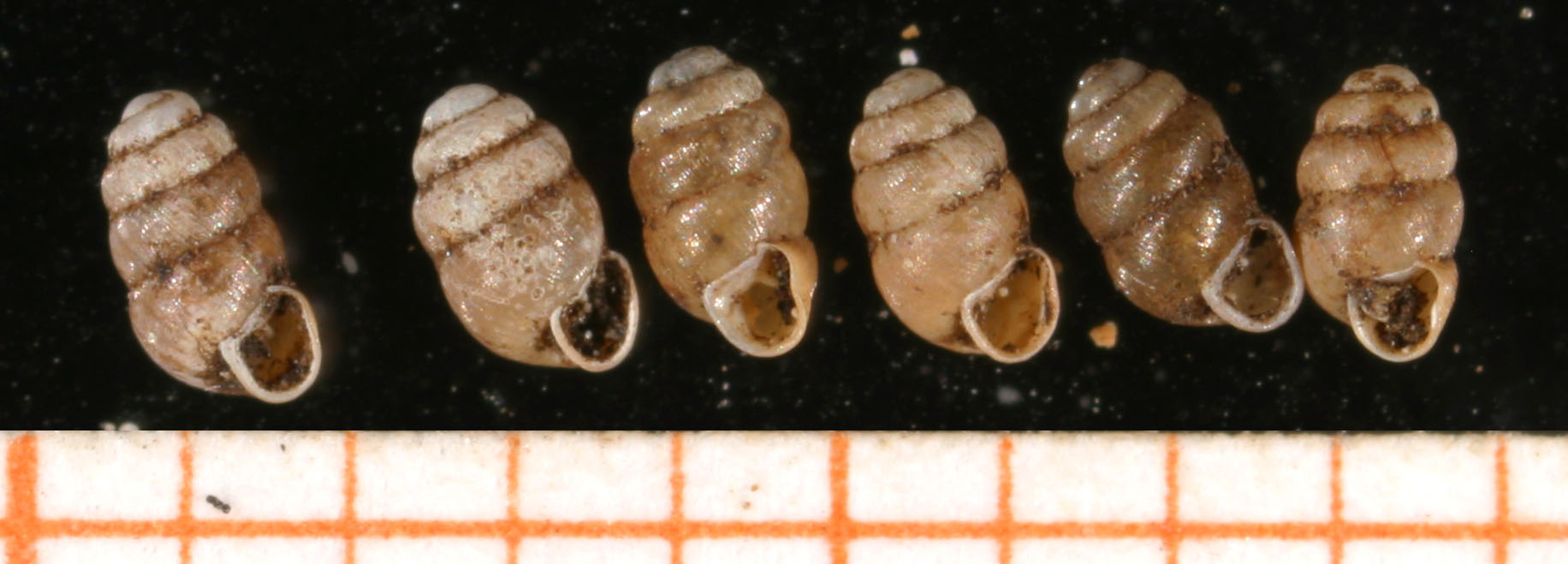
Six shells of Vertigo alpestris

- Vertigo angustior Jeffreys, 1830
- Vertigo antivertigo (Draparnaud, 1801)
- Vertigo genesii (Gredler, 1856)
- Vertigo geyeri Lindholm, 1925
- Vertigo modesta tirolensis (Gredler, 1869)
- Vertigo moulinsiana (Dupuy, 1849) - Desmoulin's whorl snail
- Vertigo pusilla O. F. Müller, 1774
- Vertigo pygmaea (Draparnaud, 1801)
- Vertigo substriata (Jeffreys, 1833)

Enidae

- Chondrula tridens (O. F. Müller, 1774)
- Ena montana (Draparnaud, 1801)
- Jaminia quadridens (O. F. Müller, 1774)
- Merdigera obscura (O. F. Müller, 1774)
- Zebrina detrita (O. F. Müller, 1774)

Clausiliidae

- Alinda biplicata
  - Alinda biplicata biplicata (Montagu, 1803)
  - Alinda biplicata sordida (Rossmässler, 1835)
  - Alinda biplicata chuenringorum (Tschapeck, 1890)
- Balea perversa (Linnaeus, 1758)
- Bulgarica cana (Held, 1836)
- Bulgarica vetusta (Rossmässler, 1836)
- Charpentieria itala
  - Charpentieria itala braunii (Rossmässler, 1836)
  - Charpentieria itala punctata (Michaud, 1831) – non-indigenous
- Charpentieria ornata (Rossmässler, 1836)
- Charpentieria stenzii cincta (Brumati, 1838)
- Clausilia cruciata
  - Clausilia cruciata cruciata (S. Studer, 1820)
  - Clausilia cruciata cuspidata Held, 1836
  - Clausilia cruciata minima A. Schmidt, 1856
  - Clausilia cruciata geminella Klemm, 1972
- Clausilia dubia
  - Clausilia dubia dubia Draparnaud, 1805
  - Clausilia dubia vindobonensis A. Schmidt, 1856
  - Clausilia dubia speciosa A. Schmidt, 1856
  - Clausilia dubia huettneri Klemm, 1960
  - Clausilia dubia schlechtii A. Schmidt, 1856
  - Clausilia dubia tettelbachiana Rossmässler, 1838
  - Clausilia dubia kaeufeli Klemm, 1960
  - Clausilia dubia gracilior Clessin, 1887
  - Clausilia dubia grimmeri L. Pfeiffer, 1848
  - Clausilia dubia otvinensis H. V. Gallenstein, 1895
  - Clausilia dubia floningiana Westerlund, 1888
  - Clausilia dubia bucculenta Klemm, 1960
  - Clausilia dubia runensis Tschapeck, 1883
  - Clausilia dubia moldanubica Klemm, 1960
  - Clausilia dubia dydima F.J. Schmidt, 1847
  - Clausilia dubia steinbergensis Edlinger, 2000
- Clausilia pumila C. Pfeiffer, 1828
- Clausilia rugosa parvula A. Ferussac, 1807
- Cochlodina costata commutata (Rossmässler, 1836)
- Cochlodina dubiosa (Clessin, 1882)
- Cochlodina fimbriata (Rossmässler, 1835)
- Cochlodina laminata
  - Cochlodina laminata laminata (Montagu, 1803)
  - Cochlodina laminata insulana Gittenberger, 1967
- Cochlodina orthostoma (Menke, 1828)
- Dilataria succineata (Rossmässler, 1836)
- Erjavecia bergeri (Rossmässler, 1836)
- Fusulus interruptus (C. Pfeiffer, 1828)
- Fusulus approximans (A. Schmidt, 1856)
- Herilla bosniensis (L. Pfeiffer, 1868) – non-indigenous
- Julica schmidtii rablensis (M. Gallenstein, 1852)
- Laciniaria plicata (Draparnaud, 1801)
- Macrogastra asphaltina (Rossmässler, 1836)
- Macrogastra attenuata
  - Macrogastra attenuata attenuata (Rossmässler, 1835)
  - Macrogastra attenuata lineolata (Held, 1836)
- Macrogastra badia
  - Macrogastra badia badia (C. Pfeiffer, 1828)
  - Macrogastra badia suprema (Klemm, 1969)
  - Macrogastra badia crispulata (Westerlund, 1884)
  - Macrogastra badia mucida (Rossmässler, 1835);
  - Macrogastra badia carinthiaca (A. Sschmidt, 1856)
  - Macrogastra badia fontana (L. Pfeiffer, 1848)
  - Macrogastra badia cacuminis (Klemm, 1969)
- Macrogastra densestriata
  - Macrogastra densestriata densestriata (Rossmässler, 1836)
  - Macrogastra densestriata gredleri Nordsiek, 1993

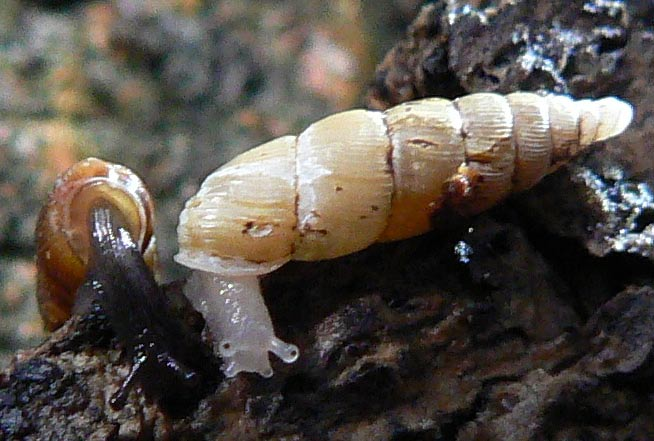
Pseudofusulus varians

- Macrogastra plicatula
  - Macrogastra plicatula plicatula (Draparnaud, 1801)
  - Macrogastra plicatula grossa (Westerlund, 1878)
  - Macrogastra plicatula rusiostoma (Held, 1836)
  - Macrogastra plicatula iniuncta (L. Pfeiffer, 1849)
  - Macrogastra plicatula convallicola (Westerlund, 1878)
  - Macrogastra plicatula senex (Westerlund, 1878)
  - Macrogastra plicatula superflua (Charpentier, 1852)
  - Macrogastra plicatula alpestris (Clessin, 1878)
- Macrogastra tumida (Rossmässler, 1836)
- Macrogastra ventricosa
  - Macrogastra ventricosa ventricosa (Draparnaud, 1801)
  - Macrogastra ventricosa major (Rossmässler, 1836)
- Medora macascarensis carniolica (Küster, 1854) – non-indigenous
- Neostyriaca corynodes
  - Neostyriaca corynodes corynodes (Held, 1836)
  - Neostyriaca corynodes saxatilis (Hartmann, 1844)
  - Neostyriaca corynodes brandti (Klemm, 1969)
  - Neostyriaca corynodes styriaca (A. Schmidt, 1856)
  - Neostyriaca corynodes evadens (Klemm, 1969)
  - Neostyriaca corynodes conclusa (Klemm, 1969)
- Pseudofusulus varians (C. Pfeiffer, 1828)
- Ruthenica filograna (Rossmässler, 1836)

Ferussaciidae

- Cecilioides acicula (O. F. Müller, 1774)
- Cecilioides petitianus (Benoit, 1862)

Punctidae

- Punctum pygmaeum (Draparnaud, 1801)
- Lucilla inermis (H. B. Baker, 1929)

Discidae

- Discus perspectivus (M. V. Mühlfeld 1816)
- Discus rotundatus (O. F. Müller, 1774)
- Discus ruderatus (A. Ferrusac, 1821)

Pristilomatidae

- Vitrea contracta (Westerlund, 1871)
- Vitrea crystallina (O. F. Müller, 1774)
- Vitrea diaphana
  - Vitrea diaphana diaphana (S. Studer, 1820)
  - Vitrea diaphana erjaveci (Brusina, 1870)
- Vitrea subrimata (Reinhardt, 1871)
- Vitrea transsylvanica (Clessin 1877)

Euconulidae

- Euconulus fulvus (O. F. Müller, 1774)
- Euconulus praticola (Reinhardt, 1883)
- Euconulus trochiformis (Montagu, 1803)

Gastrodontidae

- Zonitoides nitidus (O. F. Müller, 1774)

Oxychilidae

- Aegopinella epipedostoma juncta (Hudec 1964)
- Aegopinella forcarti Jungbluth, 1983
- Aegopinella minor (Stabile, 1864)
- Aegopinella nitens (Michaud, 1831)
- Aegopinella pura (Alder, 1830)
- Aegopinella ressmanni (Westerlund, 1883
- Daudebardia brevipes (Draparnaud, 1805)
- Daudebardia rufa (Draparnaud, 1805)
- Carpathica stussineri (A. J. Wagner, 1895)
- Mediterranea depressa (Sterki, 1880)
- Mediterranea inopinata (Ulicny, 1887)
- Morlina glabra
  - Morlina glabra glabra (Rossmässler, 1835)
  - Morlina glabra striaria (Westerlund, 1881)
- Oxychilus alliarius (Miller 1822)
- Oxychilus cellarius (O. F. Müller, 1774)
- Oxychilus clarus (Held, 1838)
- Oxychilus draparnaudi (Beck, 1837)
- Oxychilus hydatinus (Rossmässler, 1838) – non-indigenous

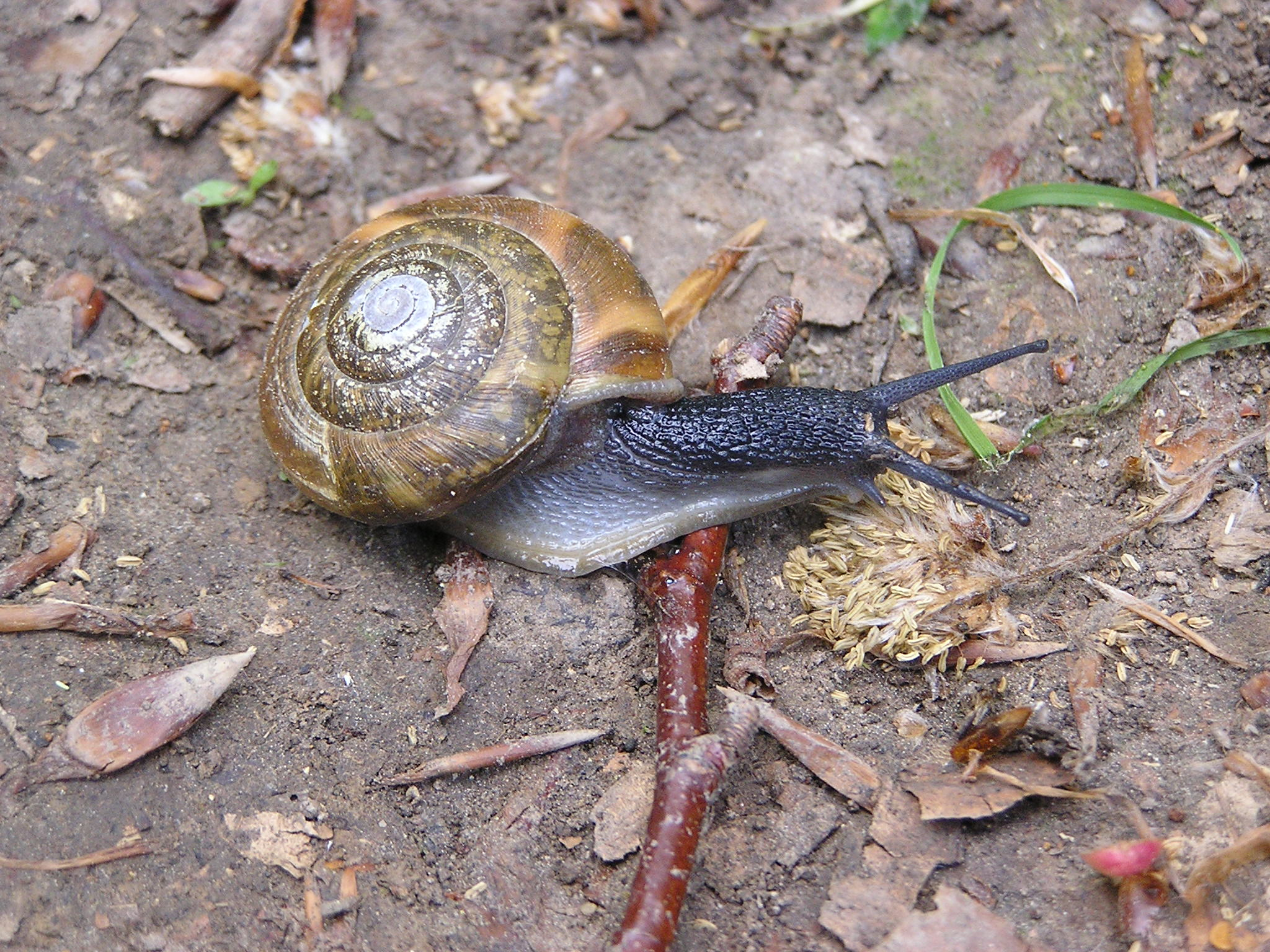
Aegopis verticillus, a common species in the Vienna Woods

- Oxychilus mortilleti (L. Pfeiffer, 1859))
- Perpolita hammonis (Ström, 1765)
- Perpolita petronella (L. Pfeiffer, 1853)

Zonitidae

- Aegopis verticillus (Lamarck, 1822)

Milacidae

- Milax gagates (Draparnaud, 1801) – non-indigenous
- Tandonia budapestensis (Hazay, 1880)- non-indigenous
- Tandonia ehrmanni (Simroth, 1910)
- Tandonia kusceri (H. Wagner, 1931) – non-indigenous
- Tandonia robici (Simroth, 1885)
- Tandonia rustica (Millet, 1843)

Limacidae

- Limax cinereoniger Wolf, 1803 - ash-black slug
- Limax maximus Linnaeus, 1758 - leopard slug
- Limax albipes Dumont & Mortillet 1853
- Limacus flavus (Linnaeus, 1758) - yellow slug
- Malacolimax tenellus (O. F. Müller 1774)
- Malacolimax kostalii Babor, 1900
- Lehmannia janetscheki Forcart, 1966
- Lehmannia marginata (O. F. Müller, 1774)
- Lehmannia rupicola Lessona & Pollonera, 1882

Agriolimacidae

- Deroceras agreste (Linnaeus, 1758)
- Deroceras golcheri aff. Regteren-Altena, 1962
- Deroceras invadens Reise, Hutchinson, Schunack & Schlitt, 2011– non-indigenous
- Deroceras klemmi Grossu, 1972
- Deroceras laeve (O. F. Müller, 1774)
- Deroceras reticulatum (O. F. Müller, 1774)
- Deroceras rodnae
  - Deroceras rodnae rodnae Grossu & Lupu 1965
  - Deroceras rodnae juranum Wüthrich, 1993
- Deroceras sturanyi (Simroth, 1894)
- Deroceras turcicum (Simroth, 1894)

Boettgerillidae

- Boettgerilla pallens Simroth, 1912

Vitrinidae

- Eucobresia diaphana (Draparnaud, 1805)
- Eucobresia glacialis (Forbes, 1837)
- Eucobresia nivalis (Dumont & Mortillet, 1854)
- Eucobresia pegorarii (Pollonera, 1884)
- Gallandia annularis (S. Studer 1820)
- Semilimax carinthiacus (Westerlund, 1886)
- Hessemilimax kotulae (Westerlund, 1883)
- Semilimax semilimax (J. Ferussac, 1802)
- Vitrina carniolica O. Boettger, 1884
- Vitrina pellucida (O. F. Müller, 1774)
- Vitrinobrachium breve (A. Ferussac, 1821)

Arionidae

- Arion obesoductus Reischütz, 1973
- Arion brunneus Lehmann, 1862
- Arion circumscriptus Johnston, 1828
  - Arion circumscriptus silvaticus Lohmander, 1937
- Arion distinctus Mabille, 1868
- Arion fasciatus (Nilsson, 1823)
- Arion flagellus Collinge, 1893 – non-indigenous
- Arion fuscus (O. F. Müller, 1774) agg.
- Arion hortensis A. Ferussac, 1819 – non-indigenous
- Arion intermedius Normand, 1852 – non-indigenous
- Arion rufus (Linnaeus, 1758)
- Arion vulgaris Moquin-Tandon, 1855 – non-indigenous - Spanish slug

Geomitridae

- Candidula unifasciata
  - Candidula unifasciata unifasciata (Poiret, 1801)
  - Candidula unifasciata soosiana (H. Wagner, 1933)
- Cernuella cisalpina (Rossmässler, 1837) – non-indigenous
- Cernuella neglecta (Draparnaud, 1805) – non-indigenous
- Cernuella virgata (Da Costa, 1778) – non-indigenous
- Helicella itala (Linnaeus, 1758)
- Helicopsis austriaca Gittenberger, 1969 – endemic
- Helicopsis hungarica (Soos & Wagner, 1935)
- Helicopsis striata (O. F. Müller, 1774)
- Xerolenta obvia (Menke, 1828)

Hygromiidae

- Euomphalia strigella (Draparnaud, 1801)
- Hygromia cinctella (Draparnaud, 1801) – non-indigenous
- Monacha cantiana (Montagu, 1803) – non-indigenous
- Monacha cartusiana (O. F. Müller, 1774)
- Monachoides incarnatus (O. F. Müller, 1774)
- Perforatella bidentata (Gmelin, 1791)
- Petasina edentula
  - Petasina edentula helvetica (Polinski, 1929)
  - Petasina edentula limnifera (Held, 1836)
  - Petasina edentula subleucozona (Westerlund, 1889)
- Petasina filicina
  - Petasina filicina filicina (L. Pfeiffer, 1841)
  - Petasina filicina styriaca (Klemm, 1954) – endemic

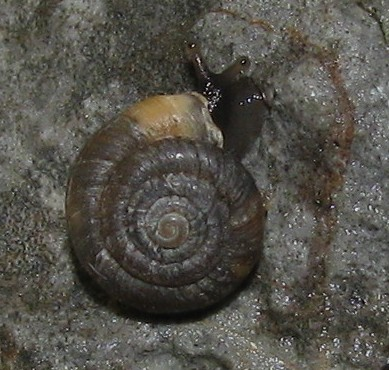
A live individual of Noricella oreinos, an endemic of the northeastern Alps

- Petasina leucozona
  - Petasina leucozona heteromorpha (Westerlund, 1876)
  - Petasina leucozona leucozona (C. Pfeiffer, 1828)
  - Petasina leucozona ovirensis (Rossmässler, 1838)
- Petasina lurida (C. Pfeiffer, 1828)
- Petasina subtecta (Polinski, 1929) – endemic
- Petasina unidentata
  - Petasina unidentata alpestris (Clessin, 1878)
  - Petasina unidentata norica (Polinski, 1929)
  - Petasina unidentata subalpestris (Polinski, 1929)
  - Petasina unidentata unidentata (Draparnaud, 1805)
- Plicuteria lubomirskii (Slosarski, 1881) – regionally extinct
- Pseudotrichia rubiginosa (Rossmässler, 1838)
- Noricella oreinos (Wagner, 1915) – endemic
- Noricella scheerpeltzi (Mikula, 1954) – endemic
- Trochulus clandestinus (Hartmann, 1821)
- Trochulus coelomphala (Loccard, 1888)
- Trochulus hispidus (Linnaeus, 1758)
- Trochulus striolatus
  - Trochulus striolatus austriacus (Mahler, 1952) – endemic
  - Trochulus striolatus danubialis (Clessin, 1874)
  - Trochulus striolatus juvavensis – endemic (Geyer, 1914)
- Trochulus suberectus (Clessin, 1878)
- Urticicola umbrosus (C. Pfeiffer, 1828)

Bradybaenidae

- Fruticicola fruticum (O. F. Müller, 1774)

Helicodontidae

- Helicodonta obvoluta (O. F. Müller, 1774)

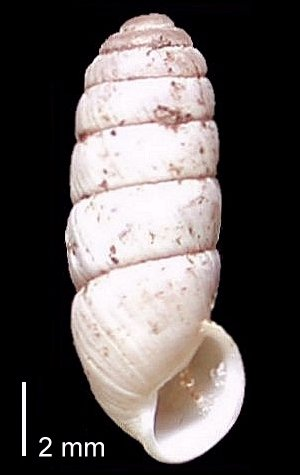
Shell of Cylindrus obtusus, another endemic species of the Austrian Alps

Helicidae

- Arianta arbustorum
  - Arianta arbustorum arbustorum (Linnaeus, 1758)
  - Arianta arbustorum alpicola (A. Ferrusac, 1821)
  - Arianta arbustorum styriaca (Kobelt, 1876)
  - Arianta arbustorum picea (Rossmässler, 1837)
- Arianta stenzii (Rossmässler, 1835)
- Arianta chamaeleon
  - Arianta chamaeleon chamaeleon (L. Pfeiffer, 1842)
  - Arianta chamaeleon subglobosa (Ehrmann, 1910)
  - Arianta chamaeleon carnica (Ehrmann, 1910)
  - Arianta chamaeleon wiedemayri (Kobelt, 1903)
- Arianta schmidtii (Rossmässler, 1836)
- Helicigona lapicida (Linnaeus, 1758)
- Chilostoma illyrica (Stabile, 1864)
- Chilostoma cingulatum
  - Chilostoma cingulatum preslii (Rossmässler, 1836)
  - Chilostoma cingulatum peregrini Falkner, 1998
  - Chilostoma cingulatum carrarense (Strobel, 1852) – non-indigenous
- Chilostoma achates
  - Chilostoma achates achates (Rossmässler, 1835)
  - Chilostoma achates cingulina (Deshayes, 1839)
  - Chilostoma achates stiriae (Forcart, 1933)
  - Chilostoma achates rhaeticum (Strobel, 1857)
- Chilostoma intermedium (A. Ferrussac, 1832)
- Chilostoma ziegleri (Rossmässler, 1836)
- Cylindrus obtusus (Draparnaud, 1805) – endemic
- Isognomostoma isognomostomos (Schröter, 1784)
- Caucasotachea vindobonensis (C. Pfeiffer, 1828)
- Causa holosericea (S. Studer, 1820)
- Cepaea hortensis (O. F. Müller, 1774)
- Cepaea nemoralis (Linnaeus, 1758)
- Cornu aspersum (O. F. Müller, 1774) – non-indigenous
- Helix pomatia Linnaeus, 1758
- Helix lucorum Linnaeus, 1758 – non-indigenous

== Bivalvia ==
Margaritiferidae

- Margaritifera margaritifera (Linnaeus, 1758)

Unionidae

- Anodonta anatina - duck mussel
  - Anodonta anatina attenuata Held, 1836
  - Anodonta anatina rostrata Rossmässler, 1836
- Anodonta cygnea - swan mussel
  - Anodonta cygnaea deplanata M. Gallenstein, 1852
  - Anodonta cygnaea solearis Held, 1839
- Pseudanodonta complanata (Rossmässler, 1835) - depressed river mussel
- Unio crassus
  - Unio crassus albensis Hazay, 1835
  - Unio crassus cytherea Küster, 1833
  - Unio crassus decurvatus Rossmässler, 1835
- Unio pictorum latirostris Küster, 1835
- Unio tumidus zelebori Zelebor, 1851
- Sinanodonta woodiana (Lea, 1834) – non-indigenous

Corbiculidae

- Corbicula fluminea (O. F. Müller, 1774) – non-indigenous

Sphaeriidae

- Pisidium amnicum (O. F. Müller, 1774)
- Pisidium casertanum (Poli, 1791)
- Pisidium conventus (Clessin, 1877)
- Pisidium globulare (Clessin, 1873)
- Pisidium henslowanum (Sheppard, (1823)
- Pisidium hibernicum (Westerlund, 1834)
- Pisidium lilljeborgii (Clessin, 1886)
- Pisidium milium (Held, 18369
- Pisidium moitessierianum (Paladilhe, 1836)
- Pisidium nitidum (Jenyns, 1832)
- Pisidium obtusale (Lamarck, 1818)
- Pisidium personatum (Malm, 1855)
- Pisidium pseudosphaerium (J. Favre, 1927)
- Pisidium subtruncatum (Malm, 1855)
- Pisidium supinum (A. Schmidt, 1851)
- Pisidium tenuilineatum ((Stelfox, 1918)
- Musculium lacustre (O. F. Müller, 1774)
- Sphaerium corneum (Linnaeus, 1758)
- Sphaerium nucleus (S. Studer, 1820)
- Sphaerium ovale (A. Férrusac, 1807)
- Sphaerium rivicola (Lamarck, 1818)

Dreissenidae

- Dreissena polymorpha (Pallas, 1771) – non-indigenous
- Dreissena bugensis Andrusov, 1897 – non-indigenous

== Hothouse alien species ==
Hothouse aliens in Austria include:

- Cantareus apertus (Born, 1778)
- Caracollina lenticula (Michaud, 1831)
- Galba cubensis (C. Pfeiffer, 1839)
- Hawaiia minuscula (Binney, 1840)
- Lamellaxis clavulinus (Potiez & Michaud, 1838)
- Lehmannia nyctelia (Bourguignat, 1861)
- Lehmannia valentiana (A. ferrussac, 1823)
- Milax nigricans (Philipi, 1836)
- Opeas pumilum (L. Pfeiffer, 1840)
- Oxychilus translucidus (Mortillet, 1854)
- Physella hendersoni (Clench, 1825)
- Radix javanica (Mousson, 1894)
- Sitala rumbangensis (E. Smith, 1895)
- Tandonia sowerbyi (A. Ferrussac, 1823)
- Veronicella sp.
- Zonitoides arboreus (Say, 1816)

== Alien species in hot springs ==
Following species occur as aliens in natural hot springs:

- Pomacea paludosa (Say, 1829)
- Melanoides tuberculata (O. F. Müller, 1774)
- Planorbella duryi (Wetherby, 1879)
- Pseudosuccinea columella (Say, 1817)

== See also ==
Lists of molluscs of surrounding countries:

- List of non-marine molluscs of Germany
- List of non-marine molluscs of the Czech Republic
- List of non-marine molluscs of Slovakia
- List of non-marine molluscs of Hungary
- List of non-marine molluscs of Slovenia
- List of non-marine molluscs of Italy
- List of non-marine molluscs of Switzerland
- List of non-marine molluscs of Liechtenstein
