= H. minuta =

H. minuta may refer to:

- Hauffenia minuta, a minute freshwater snail species found in France and Switzerland
- Helicoverpa minuta, the minute noctuid moth, an extinct moth species endemic to the United States

== See also ==
- Minuta
