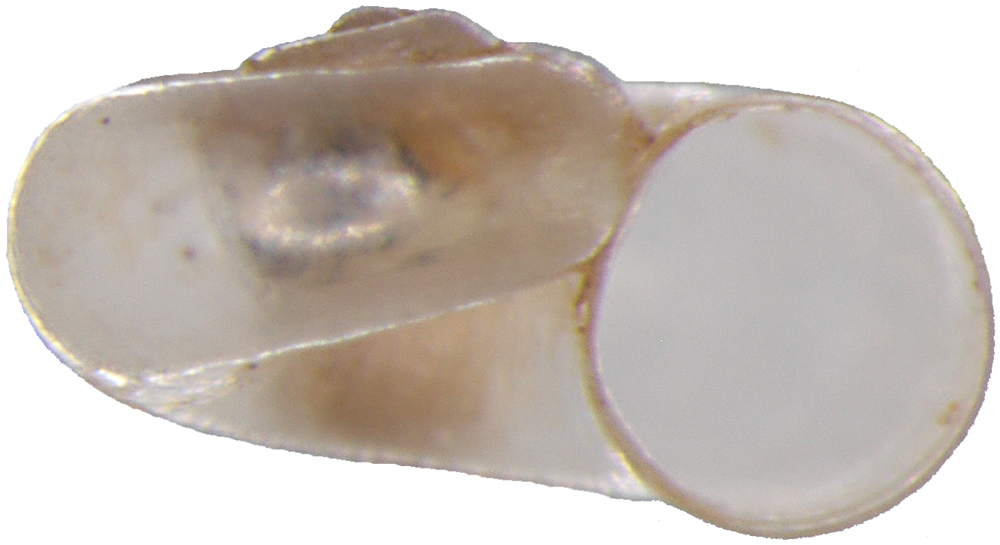
- Apertural view of a shell of Hauffenia sp. from Slovakia

Scientific classification
- Kingdom: Animalia
- Phylum: Mollusca
- Class: Gastropoda
- Subclass: Caenogastropoda
- Order: Littorinimorpha
- Family: Hydrobiidae
- Subfamily: Belgrandiinae
- Genus: Hauffenia; Pollonera, 1899

= Hauffenia =

Genus of gastropods

Hauffenia is a genus of minute freshwater snails with an operculum, aquatic gastropod molluscs or micromolluscs in the family Hydrobiidae.

== Distribution ==
Hauffenia is widely distributed in Europe (Italy, France, Austria, Slovakia, Hungary, northern Balkans).

== Species ==
Species within the genus Hauffenia include:

- Hauffenia erythropomatia (Hauffen, 1856)
- Hauffenia kerschneri (Zimmermann, 1930)
  - subspecies Hauffenia kerschneri kerschneri (Zimmermann, 1930)
  - subspecies Hauffenia kerschneri loichiana Haase, 1993
- Hauffenia kissdalmae Erőss & Petró, 2008
- Hauffenia lucidula (Angelov, 1967) / Horatia lucidulus (Angelov, 1967)
- Hauffenia minuta (Draparnaud, 1805) / Islamia minuta (Draparnaud, 1805)
- Hauffenia nesemanni A. Reischütz & P. Reischütz, 2006
- Hauffenia sp. nov. from Slovakia
- Hauffenia tellinii (Pollonera, 1898) - type species of the genus Hauffenia
- Hauffenia wienerwaldensis Haase, 1992
