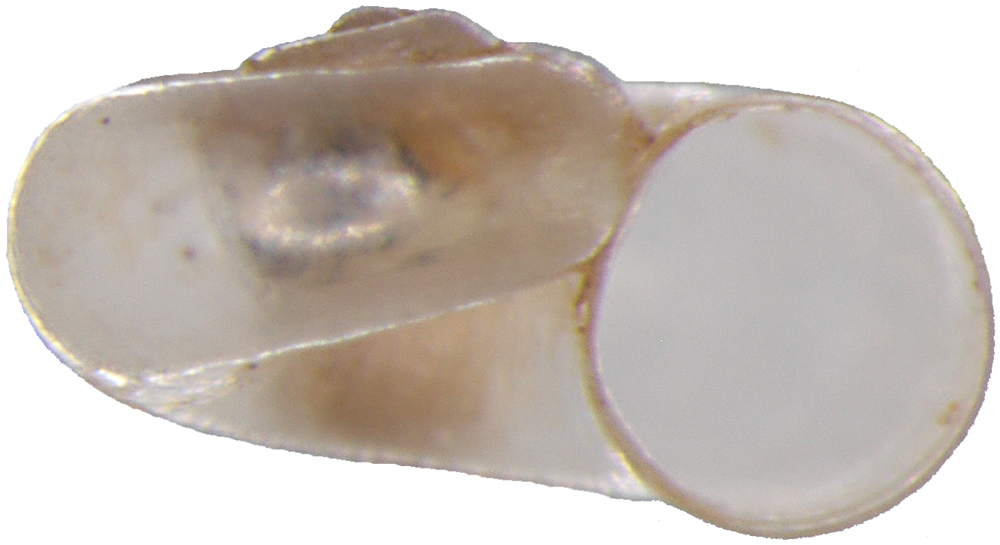
- Apertural view of a shell of Hauffenia from Slovakia

Conservation status
- Vulnerable (IUCN 3.1)

Scientific classification
- Kingdom: Animalia
- Phylum: Mollusca
- Class: Gastropoda
- Subclass: Caenogastropoda
- Order: Littorinimorpha
- Family: Hydrobiidae
- Genus: Hauffenia
- Species: H. sp. nov.

Binomial name
- Hauffenia sp. nov.

= Hauffenia sp. nov. =

Species of gastropod

Hauffenia sp. nov. is an as yet undescribed (in 2013) species of freshwater snail that lives underground, an aquatic gastropod mollusc in the family Hydrobiidae. This species is found in Slovakia.

== Taxonomy ==
The genus Hauffenia is taxonomically problematic.

Šteffek et al. (2011) confirmed that the snail from Slovakia appears to belong to the genus Hauffenia, based on the morphology of the penial characters.

However, molecular phylogeny research based on sequences of mitochondrial cytochrome-c oxidase I (COI) genes appears to demonstrate that although these snails belong to the family Hydrobiidae, they are not closely related to the genus Hauffenia.

These snails from Slovakia may actually represent not one species but two genera: Hauffenia and Lobaumia.

Specimens of this species are preserved in private collections.

== Distribution ==
This species is endemic to Slovakia. It lives only in the Slovak Karst, where it was discovered in the 1980s.

The former (subrecent) distribution of this species included also Miličské travertíny travertines near Banská Bystrica.

== Description ==
The shape of the shell is valvatiform. The shell is thin-walled and glossy. The shell has 2–2.5 rapidly but regularly growing whorls. The spire is low or very low. The umbilicus is very wide, with the earlier whorls visible inside. The teleoconch is very finely sculptured with weakly marked growth lines. The protoconch has about 1¼ whorls growing slowly; the border between the proto- and teleoconch is indistinct; the protoconch surface is nodular.

The width of the shell is up to 1.2 mm or up to 1.8 mm. The height of the shell is up to 0.8 mm or up to 0.9 mm.

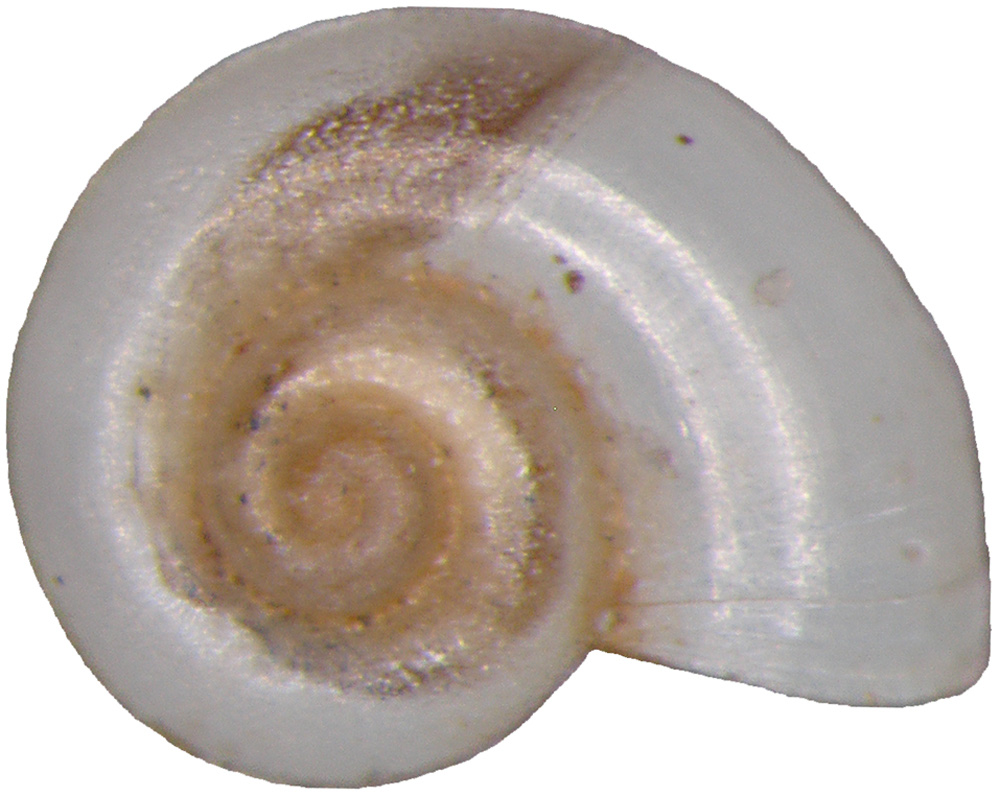
Photo of apical view.

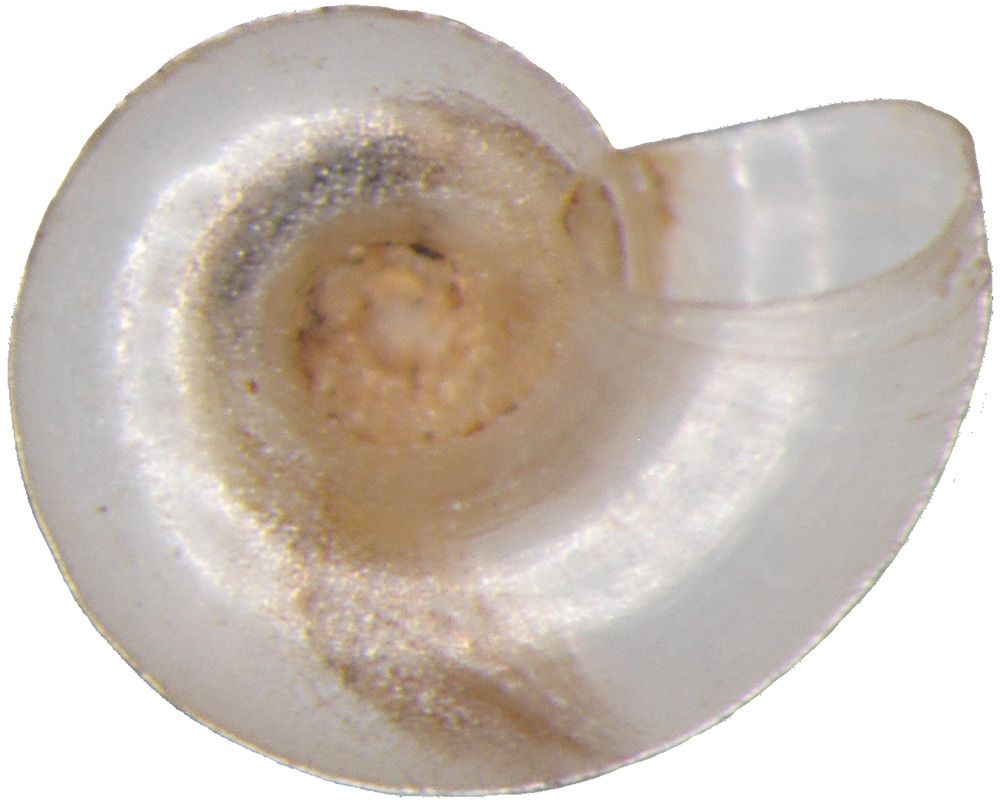
Photo of umbilical view.

The animal has no body pigment and no eyes.

The sexes are distinct (females and males occur). Reproductive system: The penis is broad and blunt, has a weakly marked lateral lobe on its left side near the apex, a very small stylet, a penial duct running in a zigzag, and no visible trace of an ejaculatory duct. The female reproductive organs are of Hauffenia-type.

== Ecology ==
This species lives in subterranean waters and in springs. This species is very rare.
