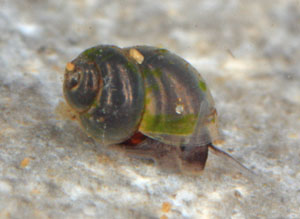

Conservation status
- Critically Endangered (IUCN 3.1)

Scientific classification
- Kingdom: Animalia
- Phylum: Mollusca
- Class: Gastropoda
- Subclass: Caenogastropoda
- Order: Littorinimorpha
- Family: Hydrobiidae
- Genus: Belgrandiella
- Species: B. mimula

Binomial name
- Belgrandiella mimula Haase, 1996

Synonyms
- Belgrandiella fuschi Boeters, 1970; Belgrandiella parreyssii Pfeiffer, 1841; Microna parreyssii Pfeiffer, 1841

= Belgrandiella mimula =

Species of gastropod

Belgrandiella mimula is a species of minute freshwater snail with a gill and an operculum, an aquatic gastropod mollusk in the family Hydrobiidae. This species is endemic to Austria.
