= Graziana lacheineri =

Conservation status
- Least Concern (IUCN 3.1)

Scientific classification
- Kingdom: Animalia
- Phylum: Mollusca
- Class: Gastropoda
- Subclass: Caenogastropoda
- Order: Littorinimorpha
- Family: Hydrobiidae
- Genus: Graziana
- Species: G. lacheineri

Binomial name
- Graziana lacheineri (Küster, 1853)

Species of gastropod

Graziana lacheineri are minute freshwater snails with an operculum, aquatic gastropod molluscs or micromolluscs in the family Hydrobiidae. This species is endemic to Austria.
