= Walklea =

Scientific classification
- Kingdom: Animalia
- Phylum: Mollusca
- Class: Gastropoda
- Order: Stylommatophora
- Family: Odontocycladidae
- Genus: Walklea; Gittenberger, 1978
- Species: W. rossmaessleri

Binomial name
- Walklea rossmaessleri (Rossmässler, 1838)

Genus of Gastropoda

Walklea is a monotypic genus of gastropods belonging to the family Odontocycladidae. The only species is Walklea rossmaessleri.

The species is found in the Balkans.
