= Belgrandiella styriaca =

Conservation status
- Critically Endangered (IUCN 3.1)

Scientific classification
- Kingdom: Animalia
- Phylum: Mollusca
- Class: Gastropoda
- Subclass: Caenogastropoda
- Order: Littorinimorpha
- Family: Hydrobiidae
- Genus: Belgrandiella
- Species: B. styriaca

Binomial name
- Belgrandiella styriaca Stojaspal, 1978

Species of gastropod

Belgrandiella styriaca is a species of small freshwater snail with a gill and an operculum, an aquatic gastropod mollusk in the family Hydrobiidae. This species is endemic to Austria.
