= Belgrandiella austriana =

Conservation status
- Critically Endangered (IUCN 3.1) Dead Belgrandiella austriana form shallow marine sediments.

Scientific classification
- Kingdom: Animalia
- Phylum: Mollusca
- Class: Gastropoda
- Subclass: Caenogastropoda
- Order: Littorinimorpha
- Family: Hydrobiidae
- Genus: Belgrandiella
- Species: B. austriana

Binomial name
- Belgrandiella austriana (Radoman, 1975)

Synonyms
- Frauenfeldia lacheineri Kuster, 1853; Graziana austriana Radoman, 1975

Species of gastropod

Belgrandiella austriana is a species of small freshwater snail with a gill and an operculum, an aquatic gastropod mollusk in the family Hydrobiidae. This species is endemic to Austria.
