= Hauffenia lucidula =

Conservation status
- Critically Endangered (IUCN 3.1)

Scientific classification
- Kingdom: Animalia
- Phylum: Mollusca
- Class: Gastropoda
- Subclass: Caenogastropoda
- Order: Littorinimorpha
- Family: Hydrobiidae
- Genus: Hauffenia
- Species: H. lucidula

Binomial name
- Hauffenia lucidula (Angelov, 1967)

Synonyms
- Horatia (Hauffenia) lucidulus Angelov, 1967 (wrong gender agreement); Horatia lucidula Angelov, 1967 ·

Species of gastropod

Hauffenia lucidula (also known as Horatia lucidula) is a species of small freshwater snail with an operculum, an aquatic gastropod mollusc or micromollusc in the family Hydrobiidae.

== Distribution ==
This species is endemic to Bulgaria, where it is known from one locality in South Dobrudza on the coast of the Black Sea. According to Bodon (pers. comm. 2009), this species has not been found since 1960, and therefore the current status is uncertain.
