= Odontocycladidae =

Scientific classification
- Kingdom: Animalia
- Phylum: Mollusca
- Class: Gastropoda
- Order: Stylommatophora
- Suborder: Helicina
- Infraorder: Pupilloidei
- Superfamily: Pupilloidea
- Family: Odontocycladidae; Hausdorf, 1996

Family of molluscs

Odontocycladidae is a family of gastropods belonging to the order Stylommatophora.

Genera:

- Odontocyclas Schlüter, 1838
- Walklea Gittenberger, 1978
