= Lobaunia danubialis =

Conservation status
- Endangered (IUCN 2.3)

Scientific classification
- Kingdom: Animalia
- Phylum: Mollusca
- Class: Gastropoda
- Subclass: Caenogastropoda
- Order: Littorinimorpha
- Family: Hydrobiidae
- Genus: Lobaunia
- Species: L. danubialis

Binomial name
- Lobaunia danubialis Haase, 1993

Species of gastropod

Lobaunia danubialis is a species of small freshwater spring snails, aquatic gastropod mollusks or micromollusks in the family Hydrobiidae.

This species is endemic to Austria.
