= Belgrandiella ganslmayri =

Conservation status
- Critically Endangered (IUCN 3.1)

Scientific classification
- Kingdom: Animalia
- Phylum: Mollusca
- Class: Gastropoda
- Subclass: Caenogastropoda
- Order: Littorinimorpha
- Family: Hydrobiidae
- Genus: Belgrandiella
- Species: B. ganslmayri

Binomial name
- Belgrandiella ganslmayri Haase, 1993

Synonyms
- Bythinella lacheineri Kuster, 1853; Frauenfeldia lacheineri Kuster, 1853; Microna saxatilis Reynies, 1844

Species of gastropod

Belgrandiella ganslmayri is a species of small freshwater snail with a gill and an operculum, an aquatic gastropod mollusk in the family Hydrobiidae. This species is endemic to Austria.
