= Graziana pupula =

Conservation status
- Least Concern (IUCN 3.1)

Scientific classification
- Kingdom: Animalia
- Phylum: Mollusca
- Class: Gastropoda
- Subclass: Caenogastropoda
- Order: Littorinimorpha
- Family: Hydrobiidae
- Genus: Graziana
- Species: G. pupula

Binomial name
- Graziana pupula (Westerlund, 1886)

Species of gastropod

Graziana pupula is a species of small freshwater snail with an operculum, aquatic gastropod molluscs or micromolluscs in the family Hydrobiidae. Distribution of this species include Austria, Italy and Slovenia.
