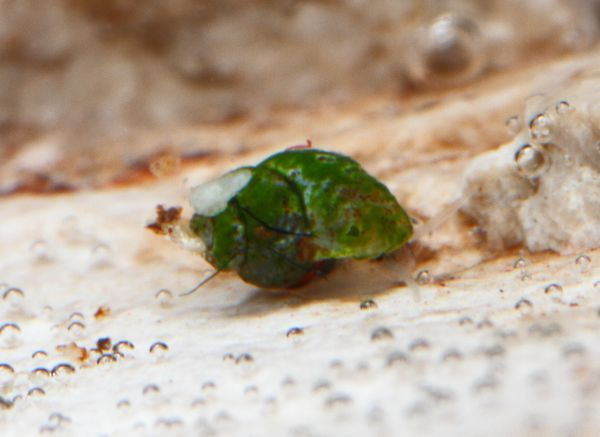
- Belgrandiella fuchsi

Scientific classification
- Kingdom: Animalia
- Phylum: Mollusca
- Class: Gastropoda
- Subclass: Caenogastropoda
- Order: Littorinimorpha
- Family: Hydrobiidae
- Subfamily: Belgrandiinae
- Genus: Belgrandiella; A. J. Wagner, 1928

Type species
- Belgrandiella kusceri Wagner, 1914

Synonyms
- Boleana Radoman, 1975; Microna Clessin, 1890; Microsalpinx Kuščer, 1932

= Belgrandiella =

Genus of gastropods

Belgrandiella is a genus of minute freshwater snails with a gill and an operculum, aquatic gastropod mollusks in the family Hydrobiidae.

== Species ==
The genus Belgrandiella includes the following species:

- Belgrandiella aulaei Haase, Weigand & Haseke, 2000
- Belgrandiella austriana (Radoman, 1975)
- Belgrandiella bajraktarevici Glöer & Mulaomerović, 2021
- Belgrandiella boetersi P.L.Reischütz & Falkner, 1998
- Belgrandiella bozidarcurcici Glöer & Pešić, 2014
- Belgrandiella bumasta Schütt, 1960
- Belgrandiella cavernica C.R.Boettger, 1957
- Belgrandiella conica Radoman, 1975
- Belgrandiella croatica (Hirc, 1881)
- Belgrandiella crucis (Kuščer, 1928)
- Belgrandiella dabriana Radoman, 1975
- Belgrandiella driniana (Radoman, 1975)
- Belgrandiella edessana Schütt & Şeşen, 1993
- Belgrandiella elburensis (Starmühlner & Edlauer, 1957)
- Belgrandiella erythropama
- Belgrandiella erythropoma Schütt, 1959
- Belgrandiella fontinalis (F.J.Schmidt, 1847)
- Belgrandiella fuchsi (Boeters, 1970)
- Belgrandiella ganslmayri Haase, 1993
- Belgrandiella globulosa Bole, 1979
- Belgrandiella goranii Mulaomerović & Glöer, 2022
- Belgrandiella hershleri Slapnik, 1997
- Belgrandiella hyalis (Westerlund, 1886)
- Belgrandiella intermedia (Boeters, 1970)
- Belgrandiella koprivnensis Radoman, 1975
- Belgrandiella kreisslorum P.L.Reischütz, 1997
- Belgrandiella krivosici Mulaomerović & Glöer, 2022
- Belgrandiella kurtovici Glöer & Mulaomerović, 2021
- Belgrandiella kusceri (Wagner, 1914) - type species
- Belgrandiella libanica Schütt, 1993
- Belgrandiella mimula Haase, 1996
- Belgrandiella multiformis W.Fischer & P.L.Reischütz, 1995
- Belgrandiella nana (Terver, 1839)
- Belgrandiella nichterli Harzhauser & Neubauer, 2020
- Belgrandiella novoselensis Radoman, 1975
- Belgrandiella ocalis Boeters, 2008
- Belgrandiella pageti Schütt, 1970
- Belgrandiella parreyssii (L.Pfeiffer, 1841)
- Belgrandiella pelerei Haase, 1994
- Belgrandiella saxatilis (Reyniés, 1844)
- Belgrandiella schleschi (Kuščer, 1932)
- Belgrandiella serbica Glöer, 2008
- Belgrandiella styriaca Stojaspal, 1978
- Belgrandiella substricta (Kuščer, 1932)
- Belgrandiella superior Kuščer, 1932
- Belgrandiella travnicensis (Radoman, 1975)
- Belgrandiella verenana Boeters, 2008
- Belgrandiella wawrai Haase, 1996
- Belgrandiella xinminensis Youluo, 1978
- Belgrandiella yulouensis Youluo, 1978

Synonyms: The following names are junior synonyms for Alzoniella slovenica: Belgrandiella alticola, Belgrandiella bojnicensis, Belgrandiella komenskyi, Belgrandiella slovenica.
