= Graziana klagenfurtensis =

Conservation status
- Endangered (IUCN 3.1)

Scientific classification
- Kingdom: Animalia
- Phylum: Mollusca
- Class: Gastropoda
- Subclass: Caenogastropoda
- Order: Littorinimorpha
- Family: Hydrobiidae
- Genus: Graziana
- Species: G. klagenfurtensis

Binomial name
- Graziana klagenfurtensis Haase, 1994

Synonyms
- Graziana klazenfurtensis Haase, 1994 [orth. error]

Species of gastropod

Graziana klagenfurtensis is a species of small freshwater snails with an operculum, aquatic gastropod molluscs or micromolluscs in the family Hydrobiidae. The species are endemic to Austria.
