= Lobaunia =

Scientific classification
- Kingdom: Animalia
- Phylum: Mollusca
- Class: Gastropoda
- Subclass: Caenogastropoda
- Order: Littorinimorpha
- Family: Hydrobiidae
- Genus: Lobaunia; Haase, 1993

Genus of gastropods

Lobaunia is a genus of minute freshwater spring snails, aquatic gastropod mollusks or micromollusks in the family Hydrobiidae.

== Species ==
The genus Lobaunia contains the following species:

- Lobaunia danubialis
