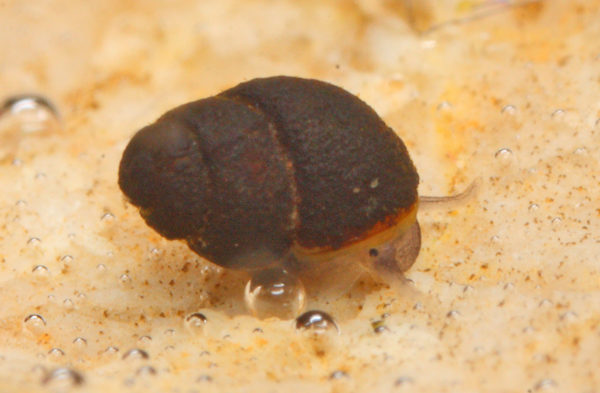

Scientific classification
- Kingdom: Animalia
- Phylum: Mollusca
- Class: Gastropoda
- Subclass: Caenogastropoda
- Order: Littorinimorpha
- Family: Hydrobiidae
- Genus: Graziana; Radoman, 1975

= Graziana =

Genus of gastropods

Graziana is a genus of minute freshwater snails with an operculum, aquatic gastropod molluscs or micromolluscs in the family Hydrobiidae.

== Species ==
Species within the genus Graziana include:

- Graziana adlitzensis
- Graziana alpestris
- Graziana cezairensis
- Graziana klagenfurtensis Haase, 1994
- Graziana lacheineri Küster, 1853
- Graziana provincialis
- Graziana pupula (Westerlund, 1886)
- Graziana quadrifoglio
- Graziana trinitatis
