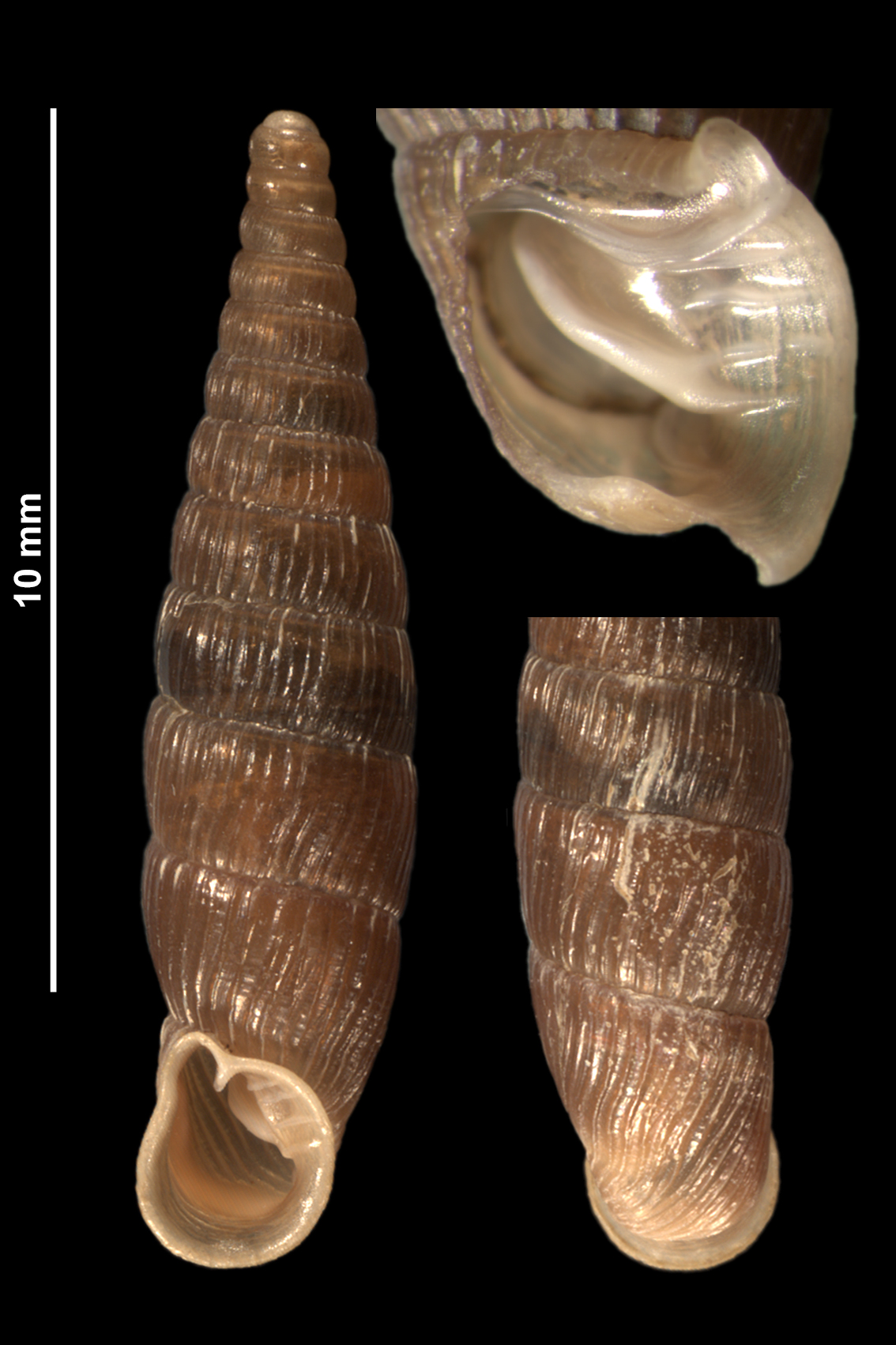
- The shell of Macrogastra plicatula

Scientific classification
- Kingdom: Animalia
- Phylum: Mollusca
- Class: Gastropoda
- Order: Stylommatophora
- Family: Clausiliidae
- Subfamily: Clausiliinae
- Tribe: Clausiliini
- Genus: Macrogastra; Hartmann, 1841

Type species
- Pupa ventricosa Draparnaud, 1801

Synonyms
- Clausilia (Pirostoma) Moellendorff, 1873 (unjustified emendation); Macrogastra (Macrogastra) W. Hartmann, 1841· accepted, alternate representation; Macrogastra (Pseudovestia) H. Nordsieck, 1977· accepted, alternate representation; Macrogastra (Pyrostoma) Vest, 1867· accepted, alternate representation; Pirostoma Moellendorff, 1873; Pirostoma (Pirostoma) Möllendorff, 1873

= Macrogastra =

Genus of gastropods

Macrogastra is a genus of air-breathing land snails, terrestrial pulmonate gastropod mollusks in the subfamily Clausiliinae of the family Clausiliidae, the door snails.

Like all clausiliids, the shells of the species in this genus are sinistral, or left-handed in their coiling.

== Species ==
Species in this genus include:

- Macrogastra asphaltina (Rossmässler, 1836)
- Macrogastra attenuata (Rossmässler, 1835)
- Macrogastra badia (Pfeiffer, 1828)
- Macrogastra borealis (Boettger, 1878)
- Macrogastra densestriata (Rossmässler, 1836)
- † Macrogastra loryi (Michaud, 1862)
- Macrogastra mellae (Stabile, 1864)
- † Macrogastra multistriata H. Nordsieck, 1981
- Macrogastra plicatula (Draparnaud, 1801)
- Macrogastra portensis (Luso da Silva, 1872)
- † Macrogastra reischuetzi H. Nordsieck, 2014
- Macrogastra rolphii (Turton, 1826)
- † Macrogastra schlickumi (H. Nordsieck, 1972)
- † Macrogastra sessenheimensis (H. Nordsieck, 1974)
- Macrogastra tumida (Rossmässler, 1836)
- Macrogastra ventricosa (Draparnaud, 1801) - type species
- † Macrogastra vindobonensis (Papp & Thenius, 1954)
- † Macrogastra voesendorfensis (Papp & Thenius, 1954)
