= Hauffenia kerschneri =

Conservation status
- Endangered (IUCN 3.1)

Scientific classification
- Kingdom: Animalia
- Phylum: Mollusca
- Class: Gastropoda
- Subclass: Caenogastropoda
- Order: Littorinimorpha
- Family: Hydrobiidae
- Genus: Hauffenia
- Species: H. kerschneri

Binomial name
- Hauffenia kerschneri (Zimmermann, 1930)

Species of gastropod

Hauffenia kerschneri is a species of small freshwater snails with an operculum, an aquatic gastropod mollusc or micromollusc in the family Hydrobiidae. This species is endemic to Austria.
