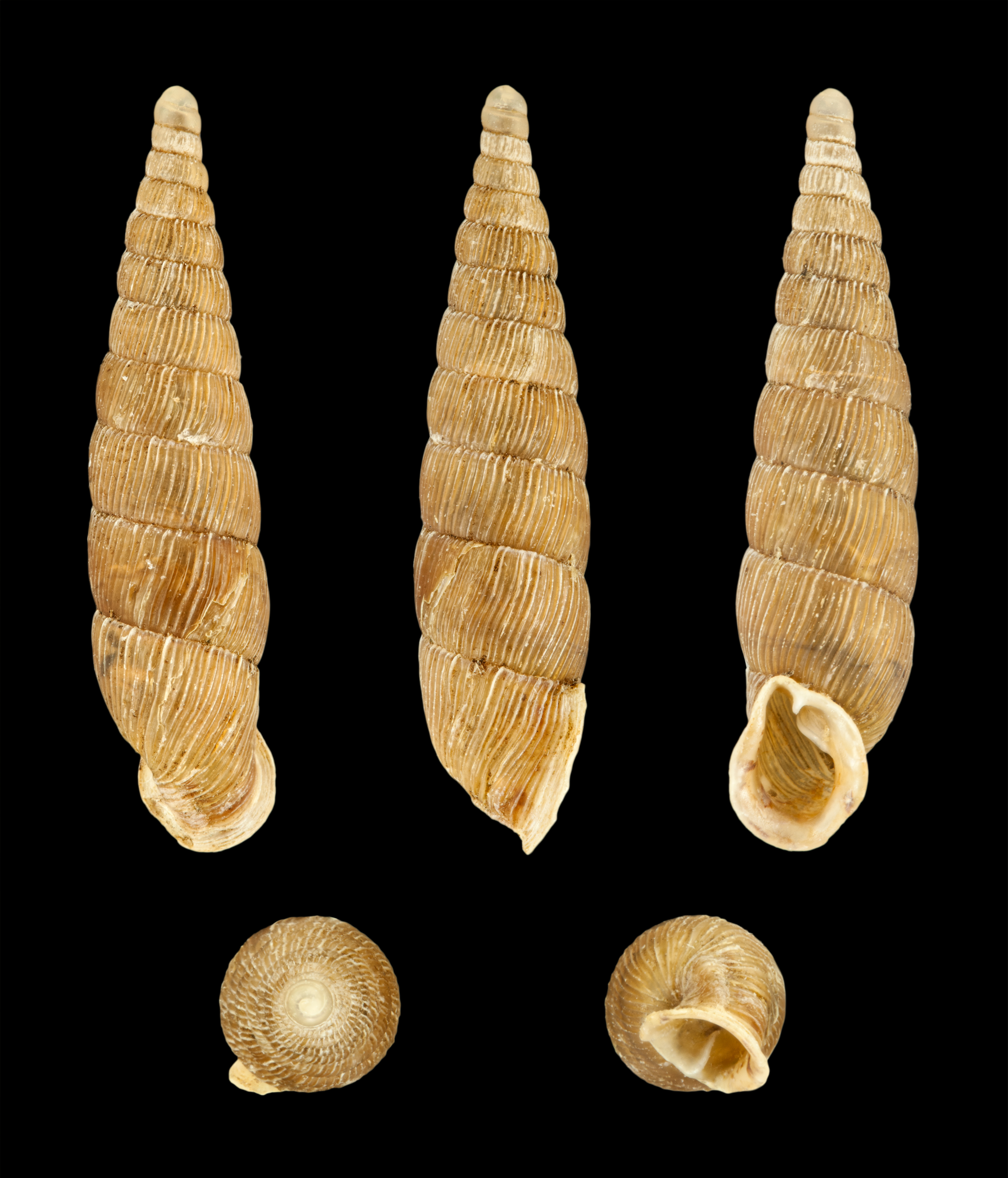

Scientific classification
- Kingdom: Animalia
- Phylum: Mollusca
- Class: Gastropoda
- Order: Stylommatophora
- Family: Clausiliidae
- Genus: Macrogastra
- Species: M. ventricosa

Binomial name
- Macrogastra ventricosa (Draparnaud, 1801)

Synonyms
- Clausilia ventricosa (Draparnaud, 1801) (superseded generic combination); Macrogastra (Macrogastra) ventricosa (Draparnaud, 1801)· accepted, alternate representation; Pupa ventricosa Draparnaud, 1801 (original combination)

= Macrogastra ventricosa =

Species of gastropod

Macrogastra ventricosa is a species of air-breathing land snail, a terrestrial pulmonate gastropod mollusc in the family Clausiliidae, the door snails.

Subspecies

- Macrogastra ventricosa brancsiki H. Nordsieck, 2006
- Macrogastra ventricosa major (Rossmässler, 1836)
- Macrogastra ventricosa ventricosa (Draparnaud, 1801)

== Distribution ==
This snail occurs in Northern and Central Europe:

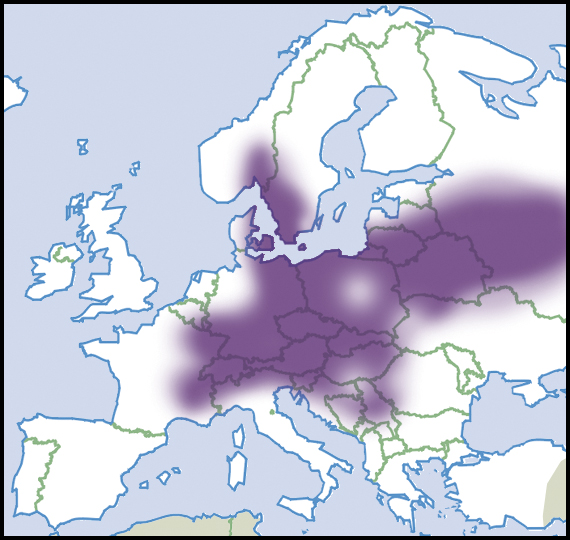
Distribution of Macrogastra ventricosa

- Norway
- Sweden
- Finland
- Estonia
- Latvia
- Lithuania
- Russian Kaliningrad Oblast
- Germany
- Poland
- Czech Republic
- Slovakia
- Switzerland
- Austria
- Hungary
- Slovenia
- Ukraine

== Description ==
The weight of the adult live snail is about 111.9 mg.
