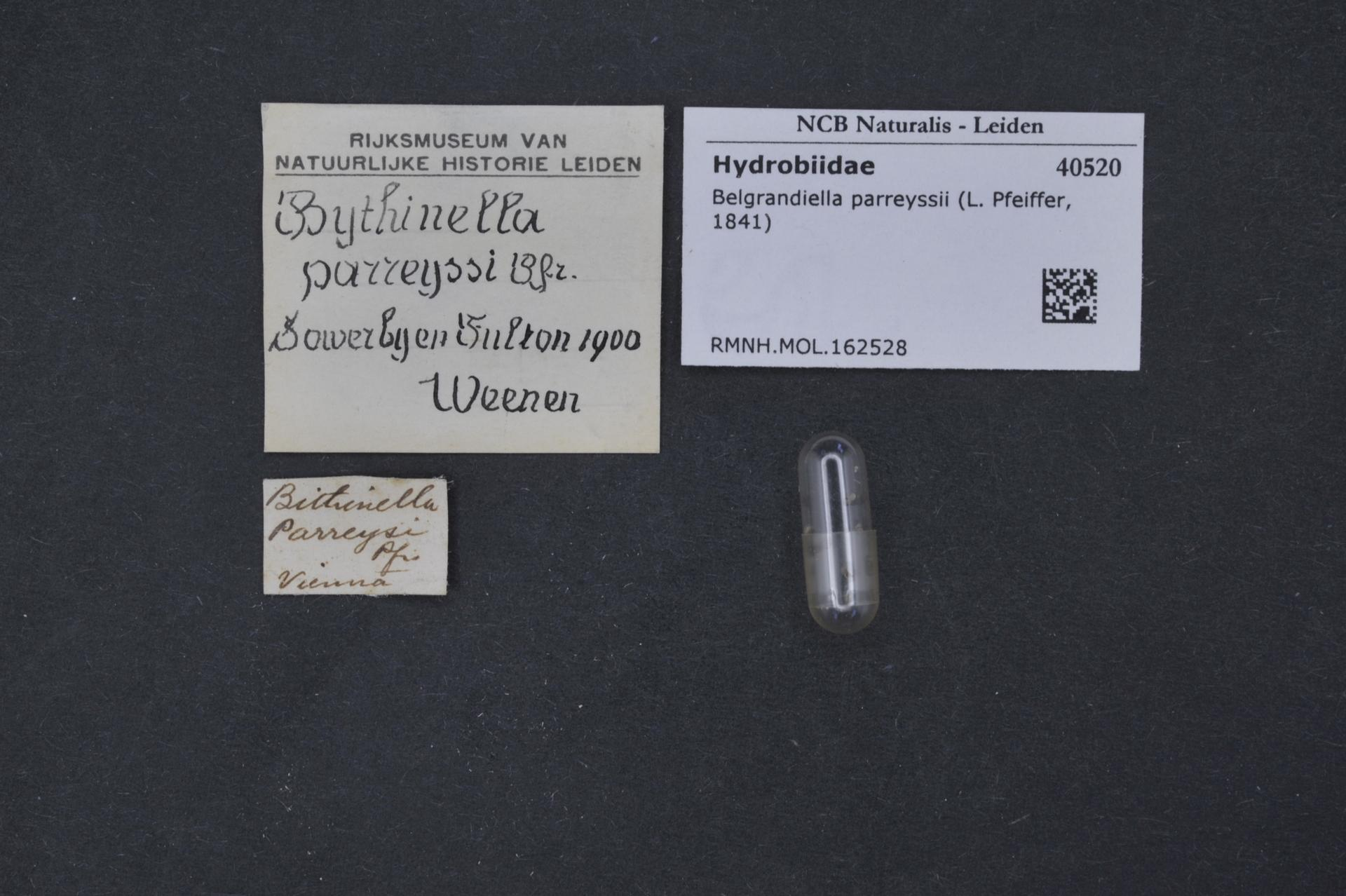

Conservation status
- Critically Endangered (IUCN 3.1)

Scientific classification
- Kingdom: Animalia
- Phylum: Mollusca
- Class: Gastropoda
- Subclass: Caenogastropoda
- Order: Littorinimorpha
- Family: Hydrobiidae
- Genus: Belgrandiella
- Species: B. parreyssii

Binomial name
- Belgrandiella parreyssii (Pfeiffer, 1841)

Synonyms
- Belgrandiella parreyssi (Pfeiffer, 1841) [orth. error]; Bythinella parreissii Pfeiffer, 1841; Paludinella parreyssii Pfeiffer, 1841; Paludina parreyssii Pfeiffer, 1841

= Belgrandiella parreyssii =

Species of gastropod

Belgrandiella parreyssi is a species of small freshwater snail with a gill and an operculum, an aquatic gastropod mollusk in the family Hydrobiidae. This species is endemic to Austria where it is found only in one thermal spring at Bad Voeslau, south of Vienna. Due to man made changes of the habitat the population has been decreasing rapidly since the 1970s.

== Bibliography ==
- Ludwig Karl Georg Pfeiffer (1841). Beiträge zur Molluskenfauna Deutschlands. Archiv für Naturgeschichte 7 (1): p. 227: Paludina, 1. P. Parreyssii
