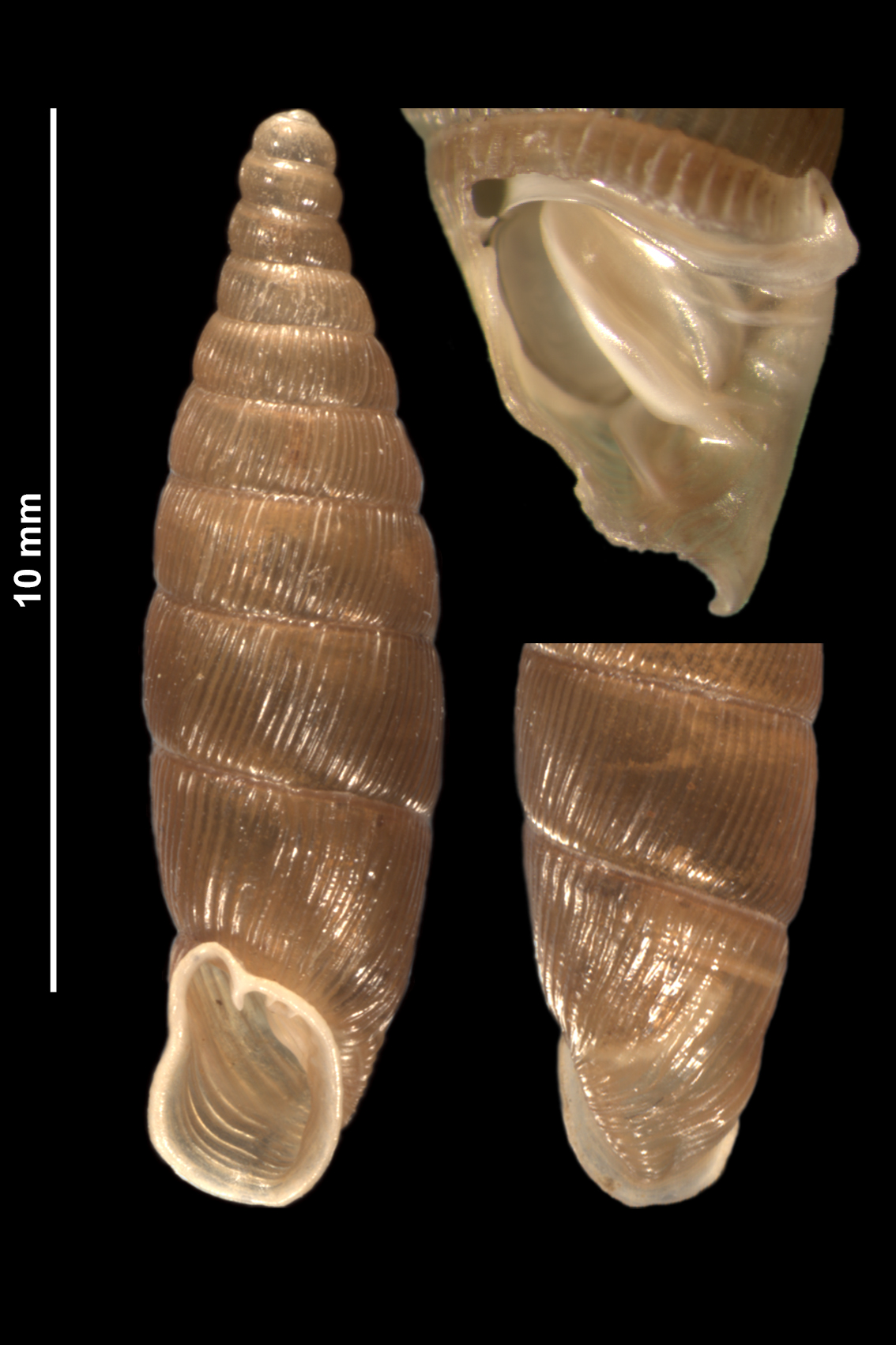

Scientific classification
- Kingdom: Animalia
- Phylum: Mollusca
- Class: Gastropoda
- Order: Stylommatophora
- Family: Clausiliidae
- Genus: Macrogastra
- Species: M. rolphii

Binomial name
- Macrogastra rolphii (Turton, 1826)

Synonyms
- Clausilia rolphii W. Turton, 1826 (original combination); Clausilia rolphii var. pellucida J. W. Taylor, 1883 (invalid; not L. Pfeiffer, 1848); Macrogastra (Pseudovestia) rolphii (W. Turton, 1826)· accepted, alternate representation

= Macrogastra rolphii =

Species of gastropod

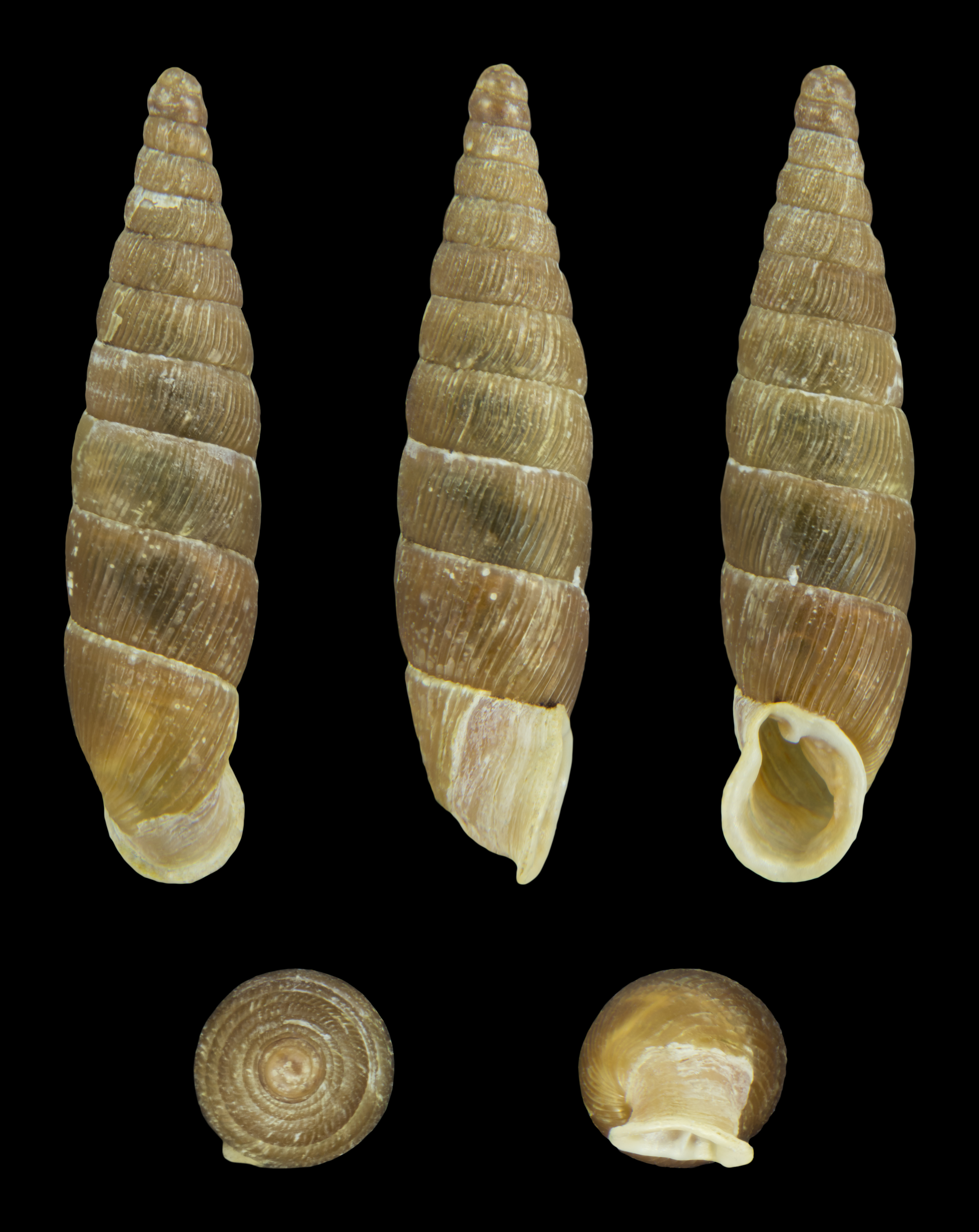
Macrogastra rolphii

Macrogastra rolphii, known as Rolph's door snail, is a species of air-breathing land snail, a terrestrial pulmonate gastropod mollusk in the family Clausiliidae, the door snails.

The shell of this species is sinistral, or left-handed, in its coiling.

Subspecies

- Macrogastra rolphii digonostoma (Bourguignat, 1877)
- Macrogastra rolphii portensis (Luso da Silva, 1872)
- Macrogastra rolphii rolphii (W. Turton, 1826)

== Distribution ==
This species is known to occur in Western Europe in the following islands and countries:

- Belgium
- Great Britain
- The Netherlands
- Portugal
- and others
