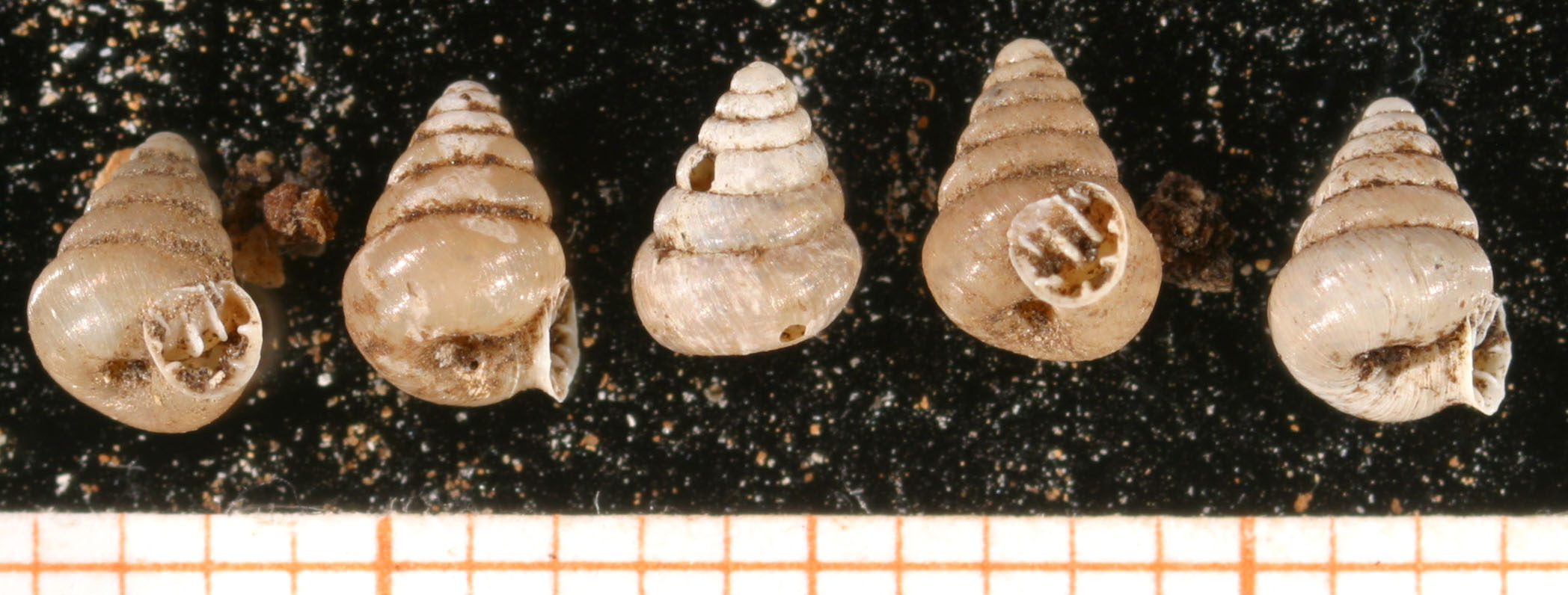

Scientific classification
- Kingdom: Animalia
- Phylum: Mollusca
- Class: Gastropoda
- Order: Stylommatophora
- Family: Odontocycladidae
- Genus: Odontocyclas; Schlüter, 1838
- Species: O. kokeilii

Binomial name
- Odontocyclas kokeilii (Rossmässler, 1837)

= Odontocyclas =

Genus of Gastropoda

Odontocyclas is a monotypic genus of gastropods belonging to the family Odontocycladidae. The only species is Odontocyclas kokeilii.

The species is found in the Balkans.
