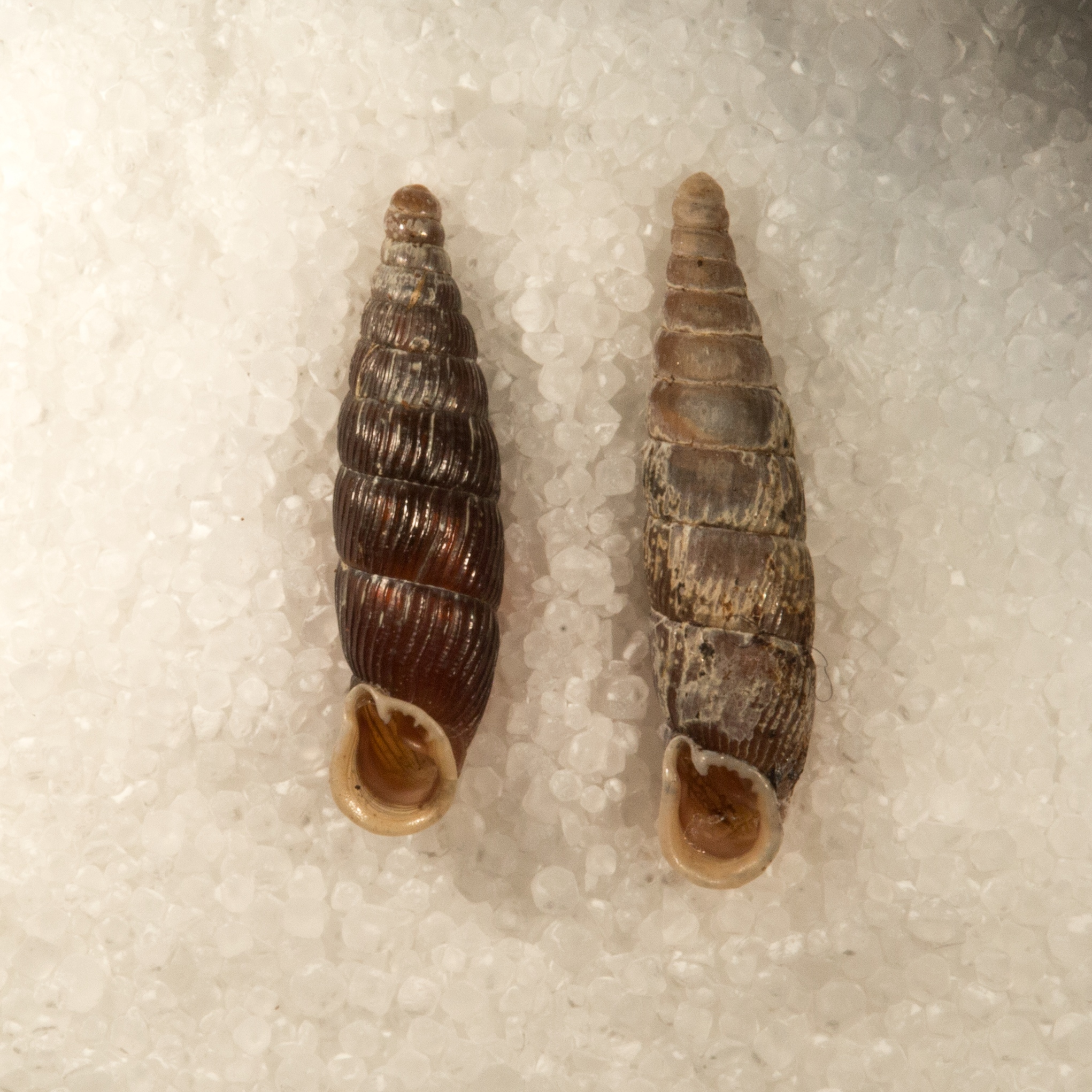
- Two shells of Macrogastra plicatula

Scientific classification
- Kingdom: Animalia
- Phylum: Mollusca
- Class: Gastropoda
- Order: Stylommatophora
- Family: Clausiliidae
- Genus: Macrogastra
- Species: M. plicatula

Binomial name
- Macrogastra plicatula (Draparnaud, 1801)

Synonyms
- Clausilia cruda Rossmässler, 1835 (junior synonym); Clausilia inuncta L. Pfeiffer, 1849 (junior synonym); Clausilia plicatula (Draparnaud, 1801) (superseded combination); Macrogastra (Macrogastra) plicatula (Draparnaud, 1801); Macrogastra (Pyrostoma) plicatula (Draparnaud, 1801)

= Macrogastra plicatula =

Species of gastropod

Macrogastra plicatula is a species of air-breathing land snail, a terrestrial pulmonate gastropod mollusk in the family Clausiliidae, the door snails.

Subspecies

- Macrogastra plicatula amiatensis H. Nordsieck, 2006
- Macrogastra plicatula apennina (Gentiluomo, 1868)
- Macrogastra plicatula aprutica H. Nordsieck, 2006
- Macrogastra plicatula licana (A. J. Wagner, 1912)
- Macrogastra plicatula nana (Parreyss in Schmidt 1857)
- Macrogastra plicatula plicatula (Draparnaud, 1801)
- Macrogastra plicatula plicosula (M. von Gallenstein, 1852)
- Macrogastra plicatula superflua (Charpentier, 1852)
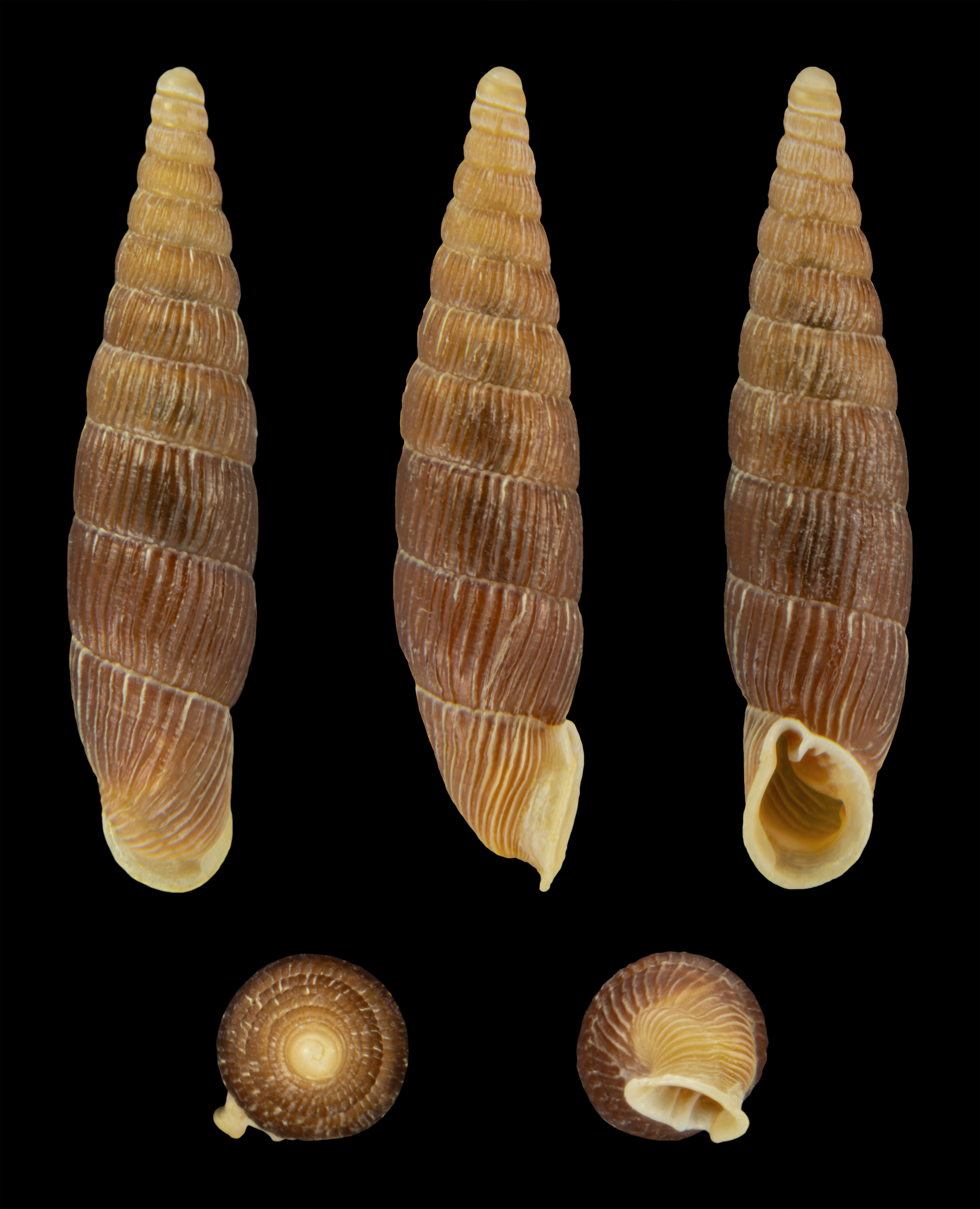
Macrogastra plicatula plicatula

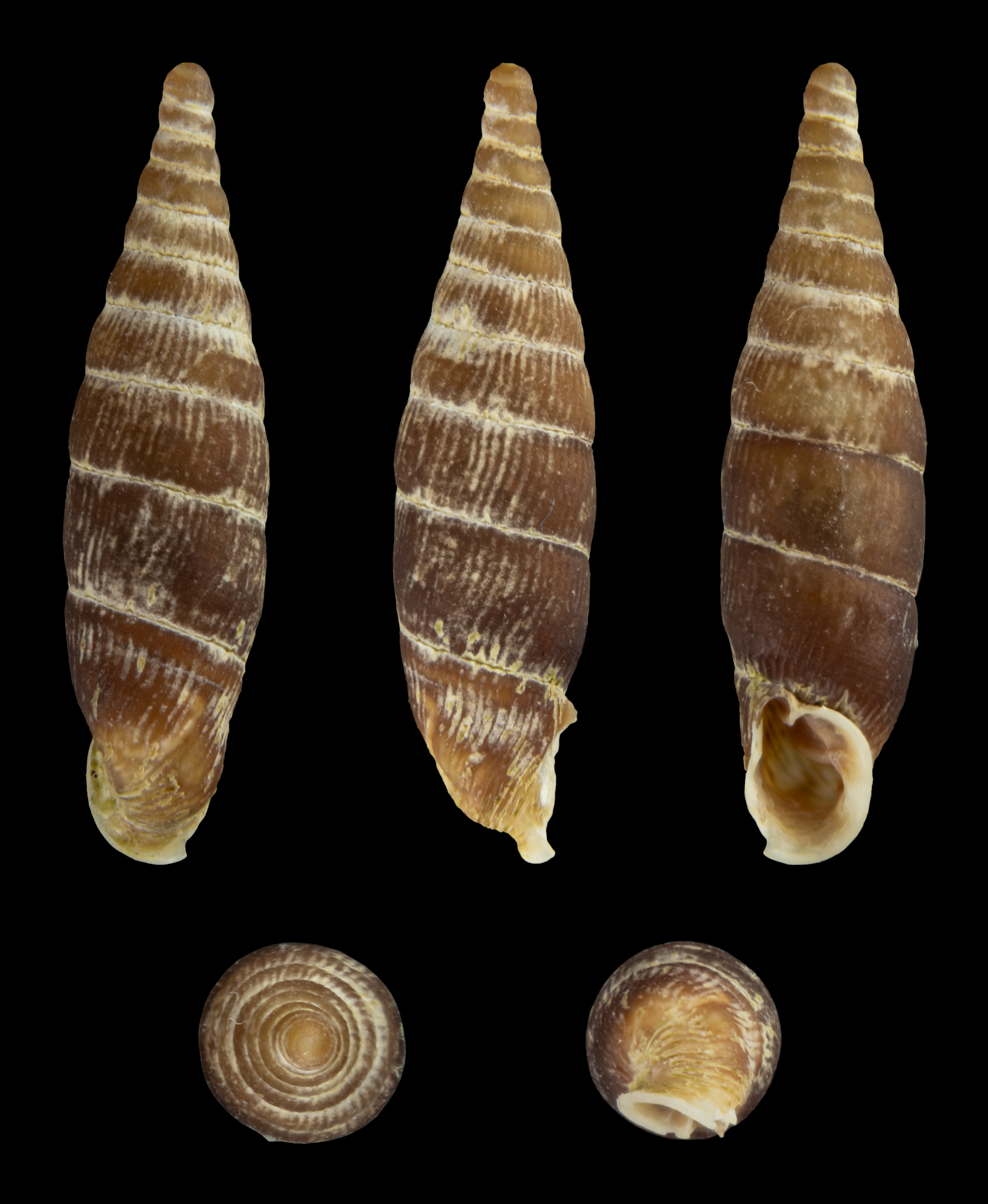
Macrogastra plicatula grossa

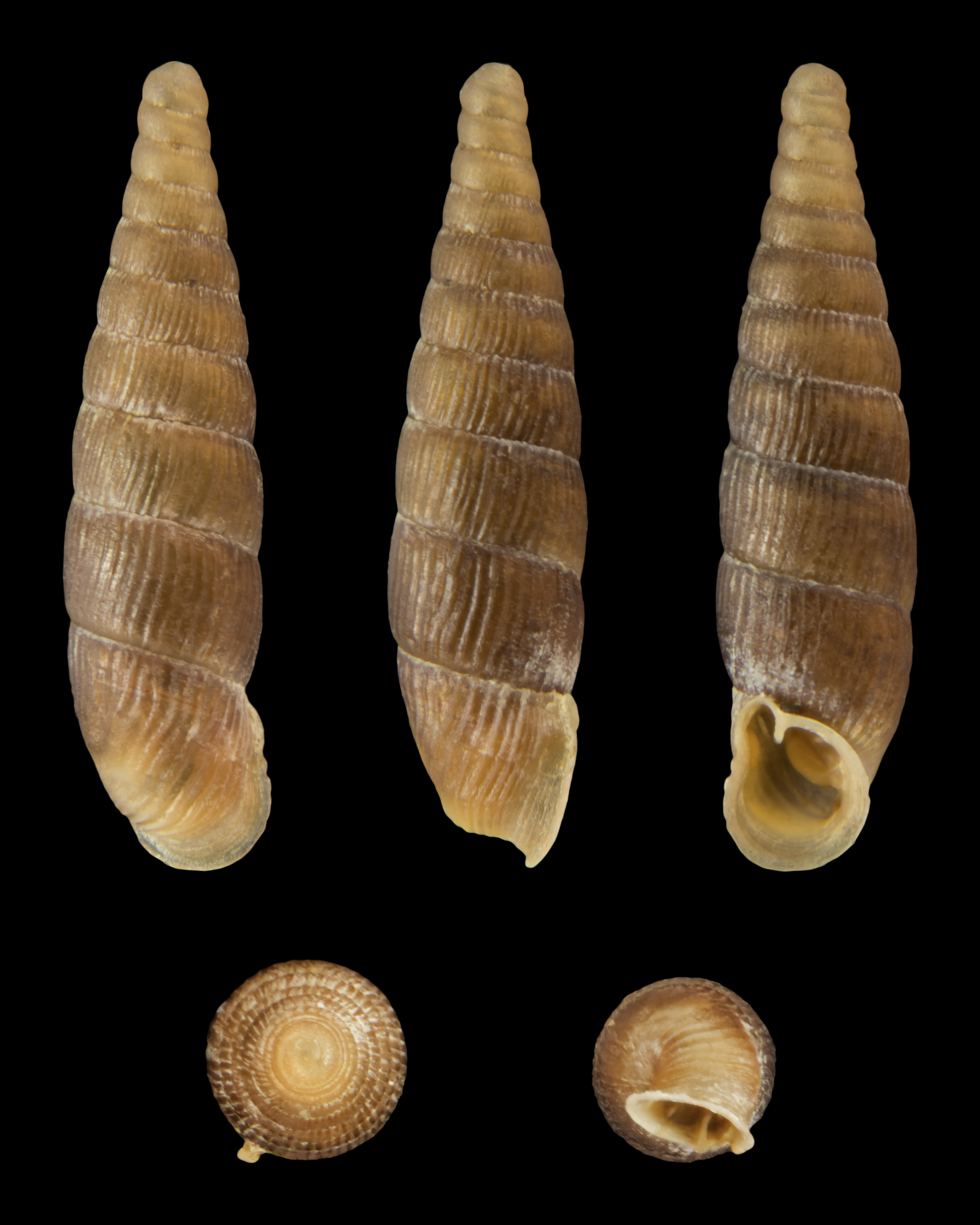
Macrogastra plicatula nana

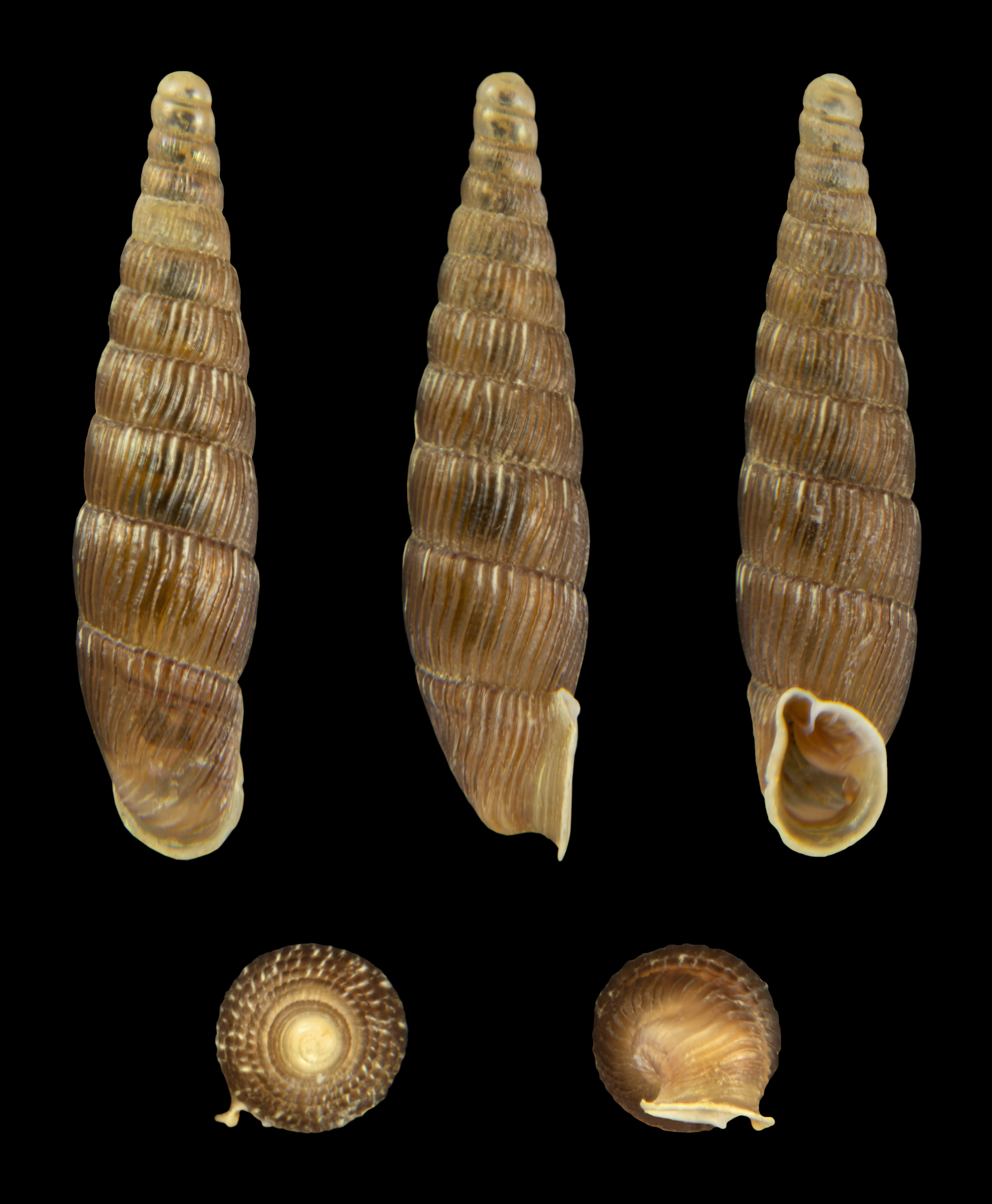
Macrogastra plicatula superflua

== Description ==
Like all the species in this family, Macrogastra plicatula has a clausilium. The weight of the adult live snail is 66.0±1.6 mg.

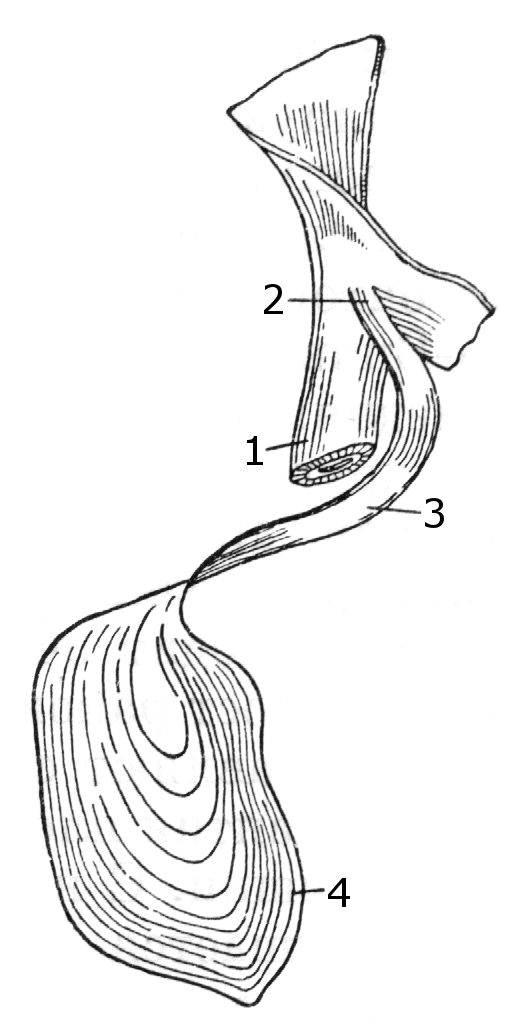
The clausilium of Macrogastra plicatula

== Distribution ==
Its native distribution is European:

- Czech Republic
- Slovakia
- Ukraine
- and others

== Ecology ==
It inhabits woods.
