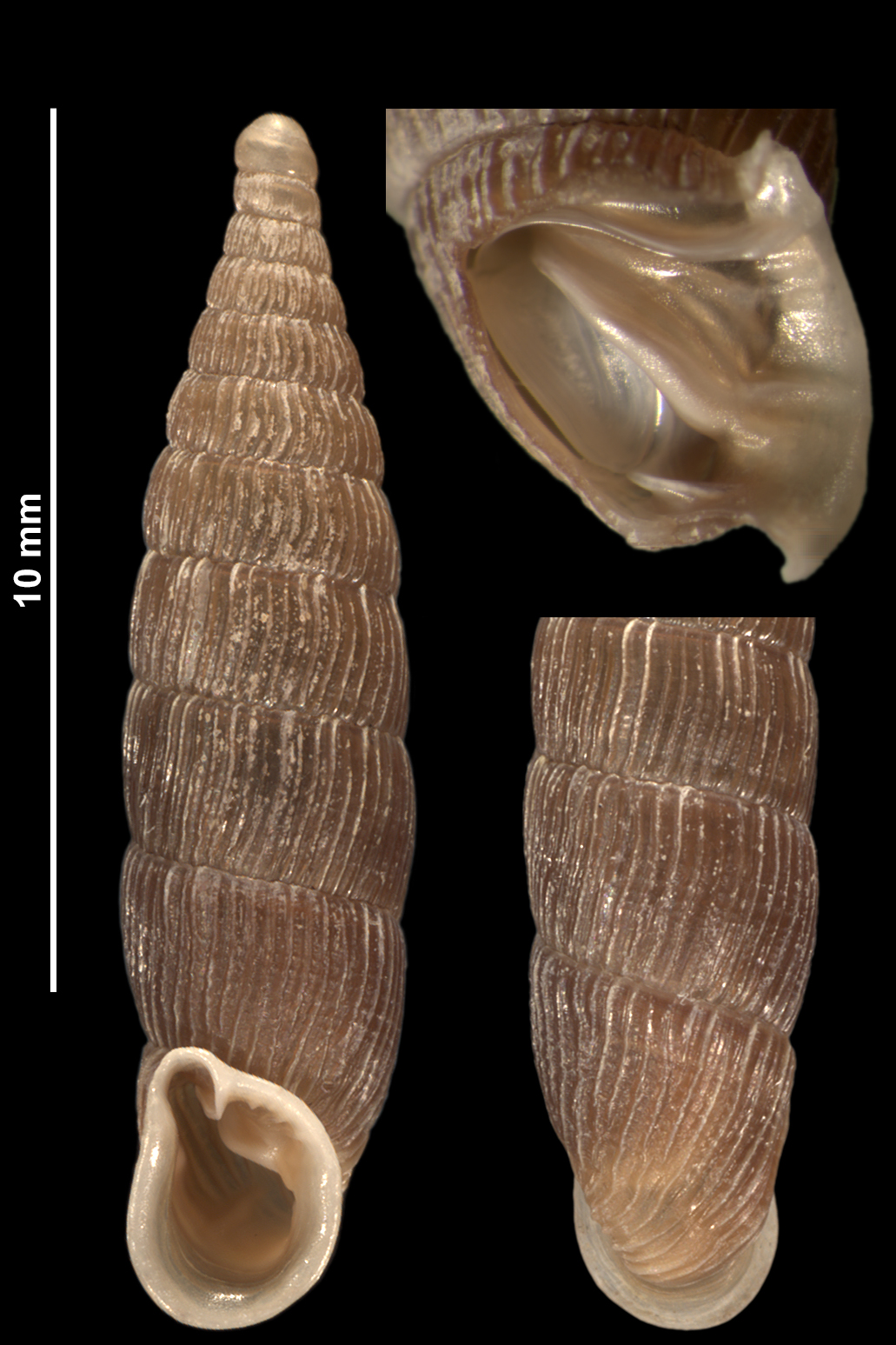
- M. attenuata sabaudina

Scientific classification
- Domain: Eukaryota
- Kingdom: Animalia
- Phylum: Mollusca
- Class: Gastropoda
- Order: Stylommatophora
- Family: Clausiliidae
- Subfamily: Clausiliinae
- Tribe: Clausiliini
- Genus: Macrogastra
- Species: M. attenuata

Binomial name
- Macrogastra attenuata (Rossmässler, 1835)

Synonyms
- Clausilia attenuata Rossmässler, 1835 (original combination); Macrogastra (Pyrostoma) attenuata (Rossmässler, 1835)· accepted, alternate representation

= Macrogastra attenuata =

Species of gastropod

Macrogastra attenuata is a species of air-breathing land snail, a terrestrial pulmonate gastropod mollusk in the family Clausiliidae, the door snails.

Subspecies

- Macrogastra attenuata attenuata (Rossmässler, 1835)
- Macrogastra attenuata iriana (Pollonera, 1885)
- Macrogastra attenuata lineolata (Held, 1836)
- Macrogastra attenuata modulata (A. Schmidt, 1856)
- Macrogastra attenuata sabaudina (Bourguignat, 1877)
- Macrogastra attenuata tenuistriata (Pini, 1879)

== Distribution ==
Distribution of this snail include:

- Germany

== Description ==
The weight of the adult live snail is about 128.7 mg.
