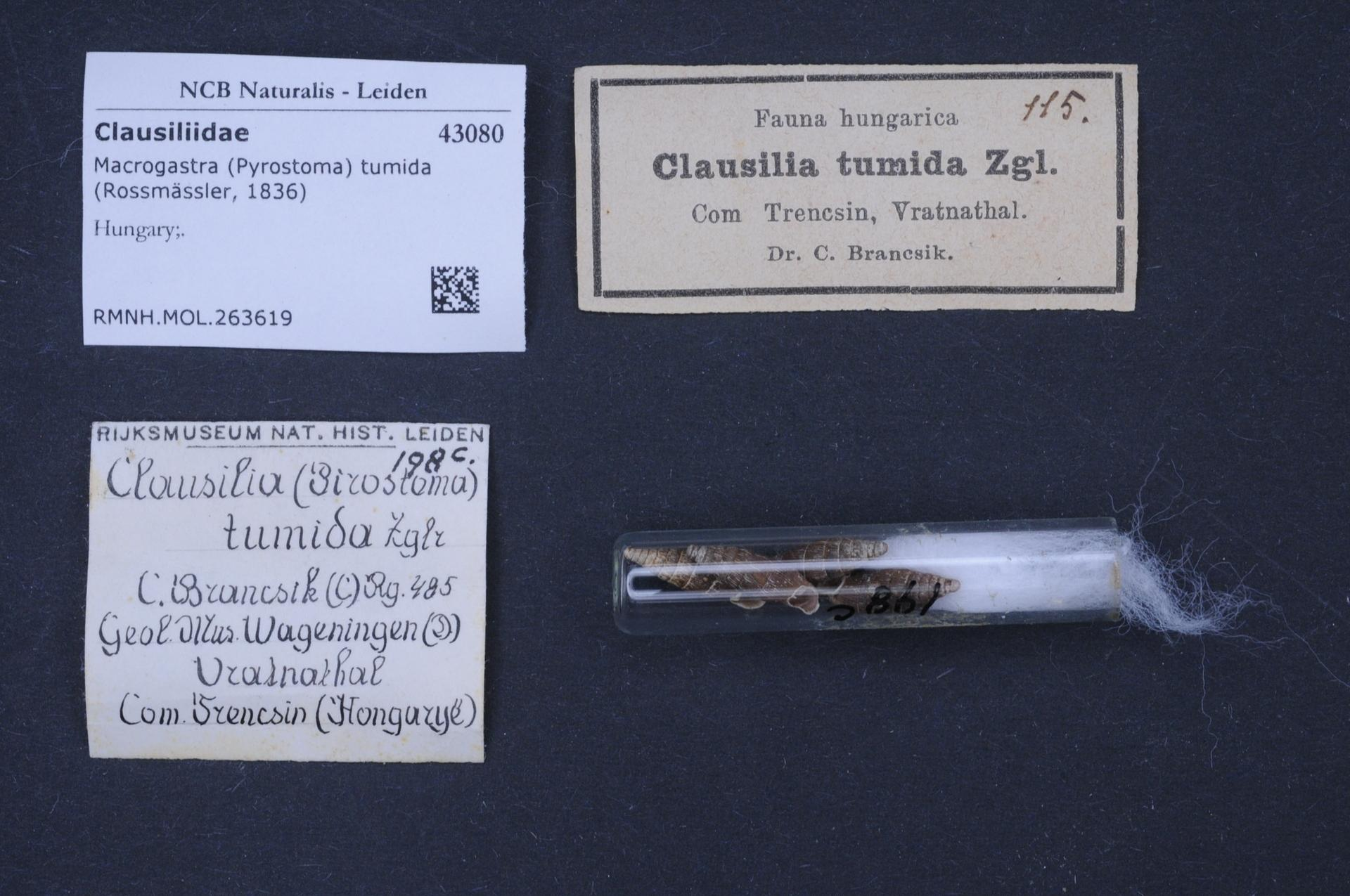

Scientific classification
- Domain: Eukaryota
- Kingdom: Animalia
- Phylum: Mollusca
- Class: Gastropoda
- Order: Stylommatophora
- Family: Clausiliidae
- Genus: Macrogastra
- Species: M. tumida

Binomial name
- Macrogastra tumida (Rossmässler, 1836)

= Macrogastra tumida =

Species of gastropod

Macrogastra tumida is a species of air-breathing land snail, a terrestrial pulmonate gastropod mollusk in the family Clausiliidae.

== Distribution ==
This species occurs in the Czech Republic, Ukraine and other countries.
