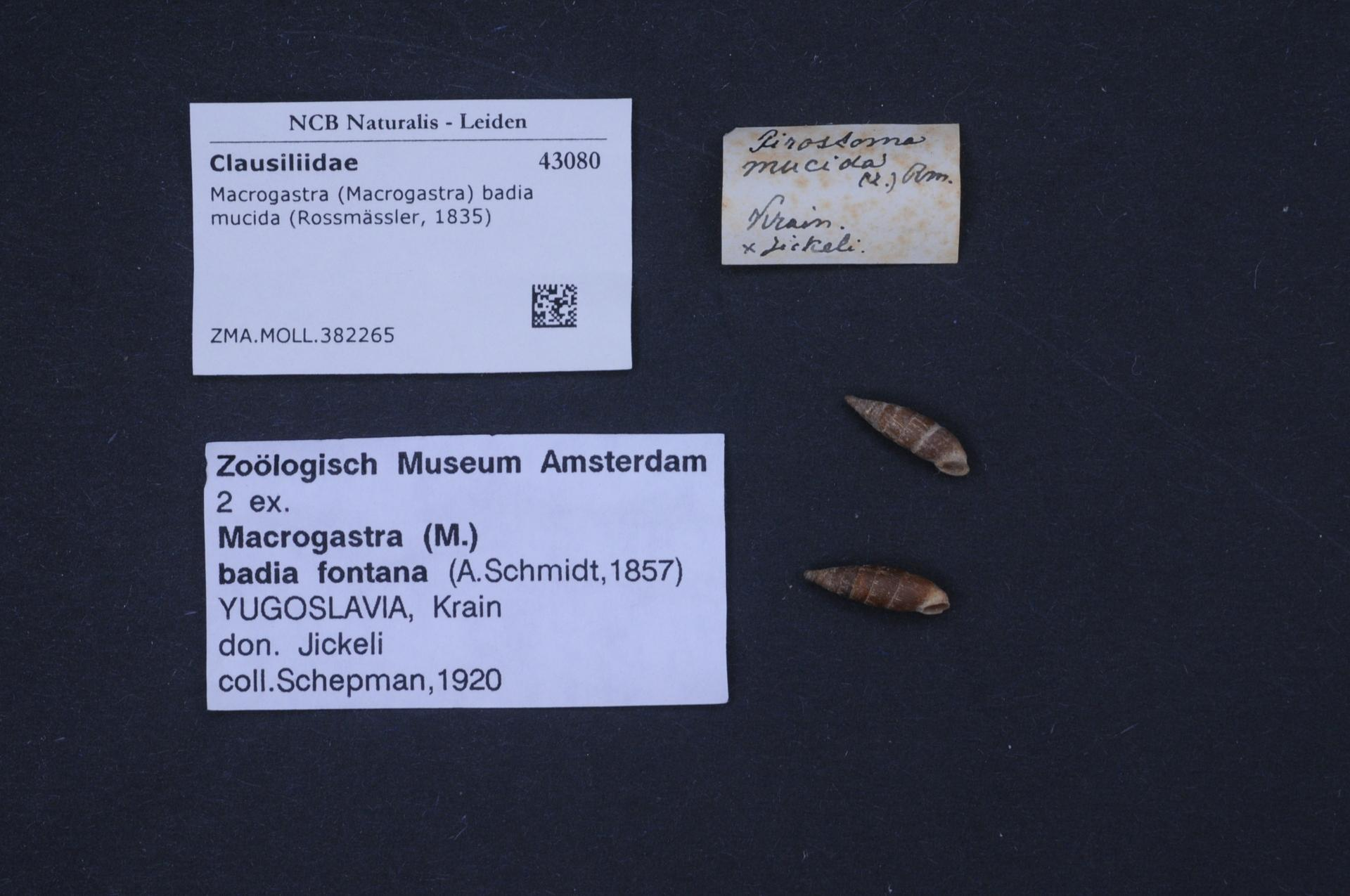
- Macrogastra badia mucida

Scientific classification
- Kingdom: Animalia
- Phylum: Mollusca
- Class: Gastropoda
- Order: Stylommatophora
- Family: Clausiliidae
- Genus: Macrogastra
- Species: M. badia

Binomial name
- Macrogastra badia (C. Pfeiffer, 1828)

= Macrogastra badia =

Species of gastropod

Macrogastra badia is a species of air-breathing land snail, a terrestrial pulmonate gastropod mollusk in the family Clausiliidae.

== Distribution ==
This species occurs in the Czech Republic - in Bohemia only.
