= Hauffenia minuta =

Conservation status
- Data Deficient (IUCN 2.3)

Scientific classification
- Kingdom: Animalia
- Phylum: Mollusca
- Class: Gastropoda
- Subclass: Caenogastropoda
- Order: Littorinimorpha
- Family: Hydrobiidae
- Genus: Hauffenia
- Species: H. minuta

Binomial name
- Hauffenia minuta (Draparnaud, 1805)

Species of gastropod

Hauffenia minuta is a species of small freshwater snail with an operculum, aquatic gastropod mollusc or micromollusc in the family Hydrobiidae. This species is found in France and Switzerland.
