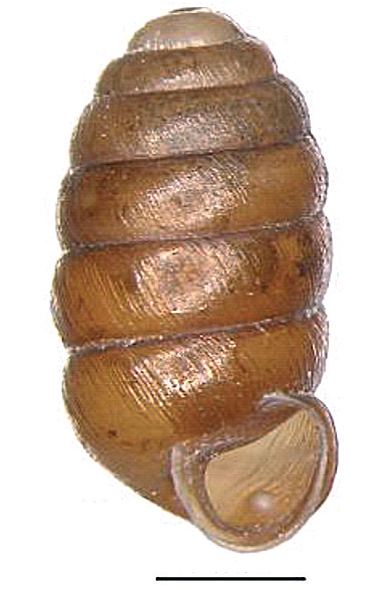
- Shell of Pupilla pratensis
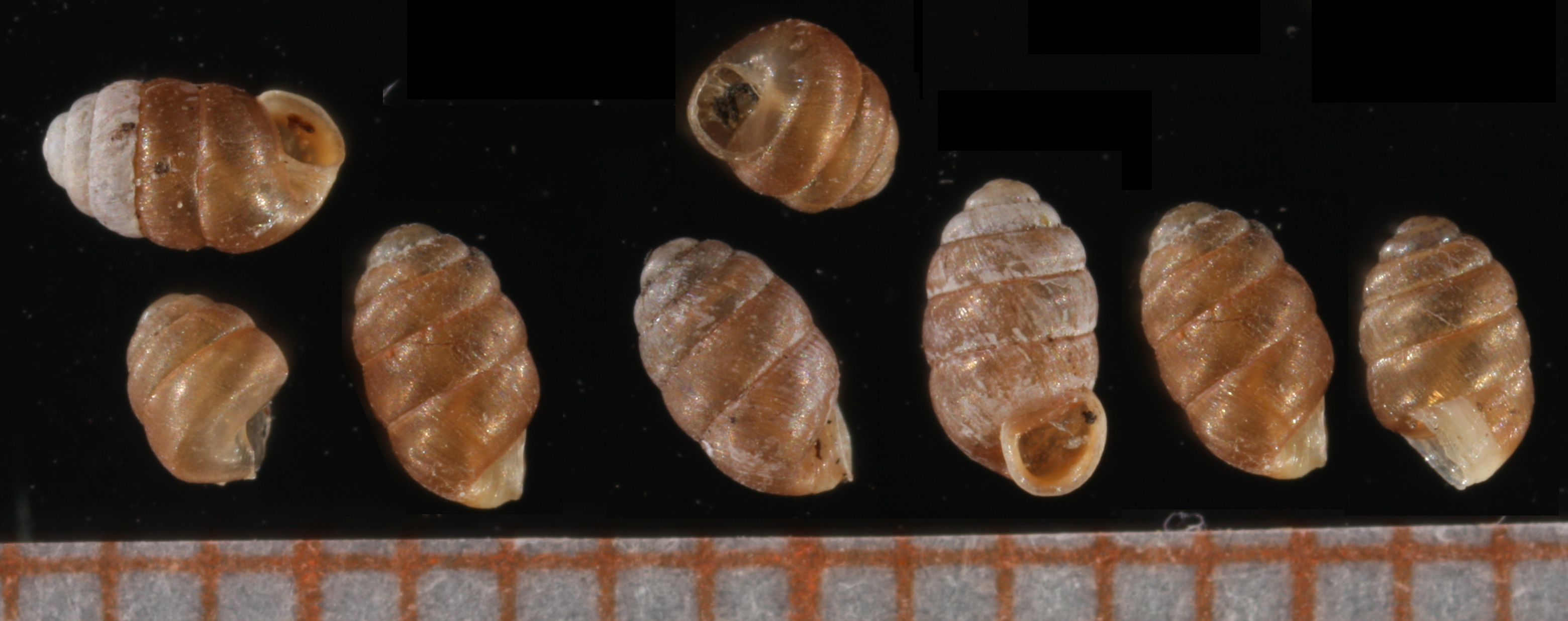
- Shells of Pupilla pratensis

Scientific classification
- Kingdom: Animalia
- Phylum: Mollusca
- Class: Gastropoda
- Order: Stylommatophora
- Family: Pupillidae
- Genus: Pupilla
- Species: P. pratensis

Binomial name
- Pupilla pratensis (Clessin, 1871)

Synonyms
- Pupa (Pupilla) muscorum var. pratensis Clessin, 1871

= Pupilla pratensis =

Species of gastropod

Pupilla pratensis is a species of small air-breathing land snail, a terrestrial pulmonate gastropod mollusk or micromollusk in the family Pupillidae. This taxon was elevated to species level in 2009.

This species is considered as a synonym of Pupilla alpicola (Charpentier, 1837)

== Taxonomy ==
Pupilla pratensis was originally described as a variety of Pupilla muscorum by German malacologist Stefan Clessin in 1871. The taxon Pupilla pratensis has long been neglected in the malacological literature, or considered a morphologically weakly defined ecophenotype – found in wet, calcareous habitats – of the variable Pupilla muscorum. The form, however, represents a distinct species, which has recently been shown in a study combining morphological, ecological and molecular data by von Proschwitz et al. (2007, 2009). Pupilla pratensis was misidentified as either Pupilla muscorum or Pupilla alpicola before 2009.

However, based on some 2012 preliminary molecular analyses, it seems that Pupilla pratensis and Pupilla alpicola are geographical subspecies of a single, more widely distributed species.

== Description ==
The shell of this species is dark to brown, translucent and thin, with fine and distinct growth lines, 6-7.5 whorls with deep suture, outline elongate and broad, aperture rounded with weakly developed lip, usually toothless, or with weak parietal and occasionally a palatal tooth, sometimes with weak cervical callus.

The height of the shell is 3.5-4.5 mm. The width of the shell is 1.85-2.05 mm.

Pupilla pratensis differs from Pupilla muscorum, with which it often lives sympatrically, in its thinner, larger and broader shell, darker and less variable colour and weaker apertural lip. The shell of Pupilla pratensis is larger – especially in diameter (1.86–2.06 mm), but often also in height (3.48–4.54 mm) – and the number of whorls (6.0–7.5) is usually greater compared to that of Pupila muscorum. The form is cylindrical in both species, but in Pupilla muscorum the last whorls converge rather smoothly towards the apex; in Pupilla pratensis the convergence is somewhat more abrupt, giving the apex a blunt appearance. The whorls are usually more vaulted in Pupilla pratensis, and the suture is somewhat deeper. The colour of the shell varies from brown to brown-grey in both species, but Pupilla pratensis is often more of a darkish chestnut brown. In Pupilla muscorum the colour is more variable, ranging from reddish brown to horny grey. The shell surface is nearly smooth in both species. It appears thinner in Pupilla pratensis, in which it is sometimes slightly translucent. The growth-lines are very fine in Pupilla muscorum and somewhat coarser in Pupilla pratensis. The apertural lip is often rather weakly developed in Pupilla pratensis in contrast to Pupilla muscorum, in which it is thicker and more pronounced. The apertural teeth are more weakly developed in Pupilla pratensis, and always arise directly from the apertural walls, never from a callus (as is sometimes the case in Pupilla muscorum). A weakly developed parietal tooth is rather frequently present, often together with a very weak, simply indicated palatal, but the mouth is often completely toothless.

It should be remarked, that in some samples from western and northern Norway some specimens of Pupilla muscorum seem to be larger than in Swedish and German populations, and hence in size close to Pupilla pratensis – this requires further studies.

== Distribution ==
Due to the fact that Pupilla pratensis has been overlooked, its distribution is only fragmentarily known. A wide, but scattered distribution, mainly in calcareous areas in Central, Northern and Western Europe is to be expected. So far, scattered localities are, known from Germany, Poland, the Czech Republic, Ireland, Denmark, Norway, Sweden, Slovakia and Great Britain.

In Europe, Pupilla pratensis seems to have a Northern Atlantic distribution, which does not overlap with the distribution of Pupilla alpicola which in Europe is mainly limited to the Alps and Carpathians.

It occurs in the following countries:

- Norway: Hedmark County, Oppland County, Nordland County In Norway Pupilla pratensis has been found in three isolated sites in the SE part of the country (Hedmark and Oppland counties) and two somewhat more to the north, in Nordland County.
- Sweden - In Sweden it is locally not uncommon in suitable habitats in calcareous districts throughout the country, from Skåne in the south to Lapland in the north.
- Denmark
- Ireland
- Scotland, Great Britain - found in 2013
- Germany
- Poland - It was reported by Otto Gottfried Goldfuss (1883) from Kobylno, Upper Silesia in Poland based on more-than-120-year-old voucher material (deposited in the Westerlund Collection, no. 2306), but no extant population was known so far. The first recent occurrence of Pupilla pratensis in Poland was recorded in 2011. The only recent site in Poland is fen in the vicinity of the village Rowele in the north-easternmost part of Poland close to the border with Lithuania.
- Czech Republic - Pupilla alpicola has been listed as a part of the fauna of the Czech Republic for a long time (as probably extinct in Bohemia and critically endangered (CR) in Moravia). However, after the elevation of Pupilla pratensis to species level in 2009, the revision showed that Pupilla alpicola does not live in the Czech Republic, and that all of the snails that were previously thought to be that species in the Czech Republic are in fact Pupilla pratensis. There were found six populations of Pupilla pratensis in the Czech Republic.
- Slovakia - one population in SW Slovakia
- Bakhchysarai Raion and Sevastopol, Crimean Mountains, Crimea

The type locality is Dinkelscherben near Augsburg, Bavaria, Germany.

Pupilla pratensis probably also occurs in Austria, Switzerland, Hungary and England.

== Ecology ==
Pupilla pratensis is typical habitat specialist. It is a pronounced hygrophilous species, inhabiting open, richer, often calcareous moist and wetland habitats. In Scandinavia it occurs in calcareous fens and meadows. The character of the sites in SE Norway (calcareous fen, sloping wetlands with springs) is in good accordance with this and with the habitats of Pupilla pratensis in Sweden; where it occurs as a typical species of open calcareous fens or wet, moist calcareous meadows. In Nordland County, Norway the habitats are of a different type, calcareous, rocky slopes close to the sea. Probably the wet climate in the western, coastal Norway makes it possible for the species to widen its ecological occurrence.

Unfortunately, this habitat type, treeless calcareous fens, is very rare, mostly isolated and nowadays highly threatened by draining and successional changes after the cessation of regular mowing and grazing. Therefore, the records are very important for nature conservation and much attention should be paid to extant populations.

The species’ ecology is similar to that of Pupilla alpicola.
