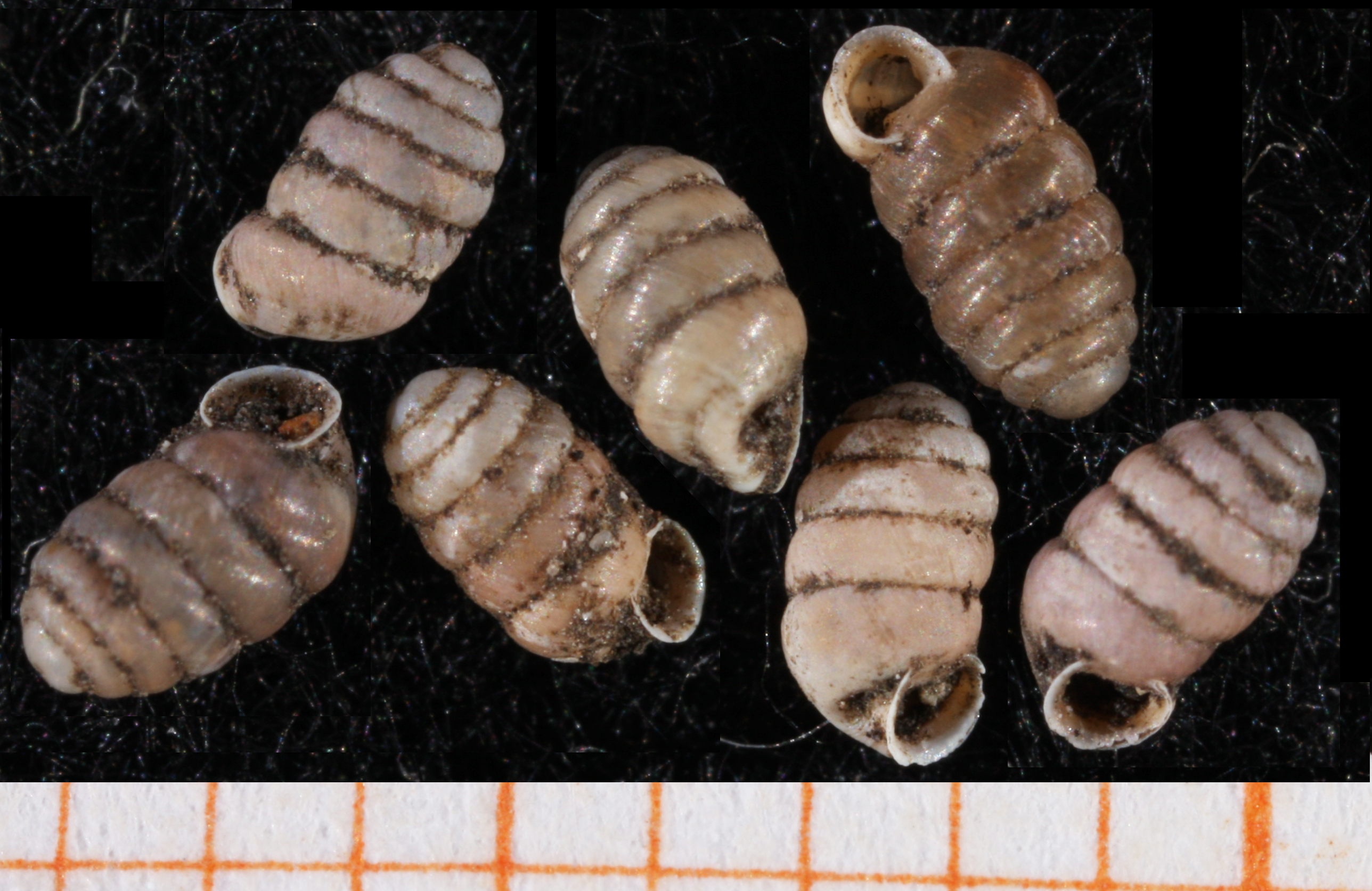

Scientific classification
- Domain: Eukaryota
- Kingdom: Animalia
- Phylum: Mollusca
- Class: Gastropoda
- Order: Stylommatophora
- Family: Pupillidae
- Genus: Pupilla
- Species: P. bigranata

Binomial name
- Pupilla bigranata (Rossmässler, 1839)

Synonyms
- Pupa bigranata Rossmässler, 1839

= Pupilla bigranata =

Pupilla pratensis

Species of gastropod

Pupilla bigranata is a nomen dubium that was used for some forms of the land snails Pupilla triplicata and Pupilla muscorum (Pupillidae), but none of these forms represent a separate species, therefore such species as Pupilla bigranata does not exist.

Considering that in the original Rossmässler's description the type locality was not indicated and that type specimens are not preserved, it is not possible to determine whether Pupa bigranata Rossmässler, 1839 is synonym of Pupilla triplicata or Pupilla muscorum.
