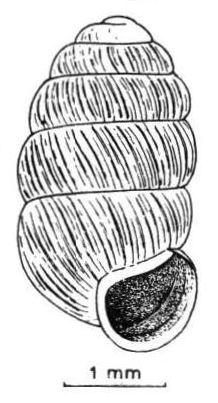
- Drawing of apertural view of a shell of Pupilla loessica

Scientific classification
- Domain: Eukaryota
- Kingdom: Animalia
- Phylum: Mollusca
- Class: Gastropoda
- Order: Stylommatophora
- Family: Pupillidae
- Genus: Pupilla
- Species: P. loessica

Binomial name
- Pupilla loessica Ložek, 1954

= Pupilla loessica =

Pupilla loessica Temporal range: early Pleistocene–Recent

Species of gastropod

Pupilla loessica is a species of small air-breathing land snail, a terrestrial pulmonate gastropod mollusk or micromollusk in the family Pupillidae.

Pupilla loessica is a significant glacial index species for the Pleistocene in Central and Eastern Europe and also in parts of NorthWestern Europe. It lives as extant species in Central Asia.

== Distribution ==
Pupilla loessica was first described by Czech biologist Vojen Ložek in 1954 from late Pleistocene loess from Předmostí u Přerova (Moravia, Czech Republic). For the Pleistocene in Central and Eastern Europe and also in parts of NorthWestern Europe, Pupilla loessica constitutes a significant glacial index species.

Individual specimens had been found since the early Pleistocene. It was widespread above all in the middle Pleistocene and late Pleistocene.

Fossil distribution of Pupilla loessica include:

- central Europe in Pleistocene. Found in loess sediments.

At an early date (1986), Ložek supported the view that Pupilla loessica was alive at the present time in Central Asia.

Recent distribution of Pupilla loessica include:

- Altai Mountains, Russia
- Northern Mongolia (1670 m a.s.l.)
- Baikal region (to the west of the Baikal Lake, 560 m a.s.l.), Russia
- Tien Shan (3000 m a.s.l.), Kyrgyzstan

== Description ==
The shells of Pupilla loessica are about 3 mm high, thin, cylindrical-ovate and have a rounded conical apex. The approximately 5 strongly curved whorls gradually increase in height and are finely and irregularly ribbed. The short elliptical aperture has no denticles, no palatal callus and is only slightly broadened. The crest is at most indicated by a weak band.

The shells are usually a strong brown colour when fresh. The fine ribs evidence very low, fragile rims which are not always visible in recent shells. On weathered shells the fine ribs are still visible although less pronounced, as on the shells of the Pleistocene Pupilla loessica.

The width of the recent shells is 1.6-1.8 mm. The height of the shells of the recent shell is 2.5-3.3 mm.

The species differs from Pupilla muscorum by its smaller size, the strongly rounded and ribbed whorls and the lack of denticles and crest. The species is similar to Pupilla alpicola with similar intraspecific shell shape differences across time suggesting that similar niche shifts have led to similar transformations in parallel.

== Ecology ==
Pupilla loessica occur from woodland to dry steppe. The altitude ranges from 560 m a.s.l. to high altitude habitats around 3000 m a.s.l. This species prefer continental types of habitat with average annual temperatures markedly below 0 °C. The climate ranges from continental to sub-boreal climate. Although it is a frequent loess mollusc, it apparently lived in various glacial habitats.

Pupilla loessica is found in various different habitats in the Saylyugem Mountains. These habitats range from stony steppe via open woodland with Larix sibirica, shrubland, mesophilic meadows to humid high altitude meadows with Carex sp. and Dryas oxyodonta (alpine tundra).

For example in Saylyugem Mountains Pupilla loessica lives in 2200–2650 m a.s.l. The closest known meteorological station is the Kosh Agach Station: the average annual temperature recorded amounts to –6.7 °C (January –32 °C, July 13 °C) and the annual rainfall amounts to about 110–150 mm on average.

This species often accompanies the so-called Pupilla fauna and Columella fauna (according to Ložek 1964). In addition to Pupilla spp., species which like humidity, such as Columella columella or Vertigo genesii, are also often found together with Pupilla loessica. The corresponding accompanying fauna is also adapted to the cold habitats, including e.g. Columella columella, Vertigo genesii, Vallonia tenuilabris, etc. Such malacofauna in recent habitats (especially on the humid alpine meadows) correspond to those of the Pleistocene glacial habitats of the Central European region.
