= Lyropupa hawaiiensis =

Conservation status
- Data Deficient (IUCN 2.3)

- Critically Imperiled (NatureServe)

Scientific classification
- Kingdom: Animalia
- Phylum: Mollusca
- Class: Gastropoda
- Order: Stylommatophora
- Family: Pupillidae
- Genus: Lyropupa
- Species: L. hawaiiensis

Binomial name
- Lyropupa hawaiiensis Ancey, 1904

Species of gastropod

Lyropupa hawaiiensis is a species of air-breathing land snail, terrestrial pulmonate gastropod mollusk in the family Pupillidae. This species is endemic to the United States.
