= Lyropupa thaanumi =

Conservation status
- Data Deficient (IUCN 2.3)

- Critically Imperiled (NatureServe)

Scientific classification
- Kingdom: Animalia
- Phylum: Mollusca
- Class: Gastropoda
- Order: Stylommatophora
- Family: Pupillidae
- Genus: Lyropupa
- Species: L. thaanumi

Binomial name
- Lyropupa thaanumi Cooke & Pilsbry, 1920

Species of gastropod

Lyropupa thaanumi is a species of air-breathing land snail, terrestrial pulmonate gastropod mollusks in the family Pupillidae. This species is endemic to Hawaii.
