= Pupoidopsis hawaiensis =

Conservation status
- Data Deficient (IUCN 2.3)

Scientific classification
- Kingdom: Animalia
- Phylum: Mollusca
- Class: Gastropoda
- Order: Stylommatophora
- Family: Pupillidae
- Genus: Pupoidopsis
- Species: P. hawaiensis

Binomial name
- Pupoidopsis hawaiensis Pilsbry & Cooke, 1920

Species of gastropod

Pupoidopsis hawaiensis is a species of very small or minute air-breathing land snail, a terrestrial pulmonate gastropod mollusk or micromollusk in the family Pupillidae.

This species is endemic to the Hawaii.
