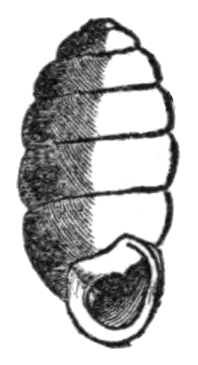
- A shell of Pupilla blandi

Conservation status
- Apparently Secure (NatureServe)

Scientific classification
- Kingdom: Animalia
- Phylum: Mollusca
- Class: Gastropoda
- Order: Stylommatophora
- Family: Pupillidae
- Genus: Pupilla
- Species: P. blandii

Binomial name
- Pupilla blandii E. S. Morse, 1865

Synonyms
- Pupa blandii (Morse, 1865); Pupa blandii f. obtusa Cockerell, 1892; Pupa blandii var. edentata Squyer, 1894; Pupa sublubrica Ancey, 1881; Pupilla blandi subsp. charlestonensis Pilsbry, 1921; Pupilla blandi var. alba Cockerell, 1888; Pupilla muscorum subsp. xerobia Pilsbry, 1914

= Pupilla blandii =

Species of gastropod

Pupilla blandii, common name the Rocky Mountain column, is a species of very small or minute air-breathing land snail, a terrestrial pulmonate gastropod mollusk or micromollusk in the family Pupillidae.

== Distribution ==
This common species occurs in the United States.
