= Lyropupa striatula =

Conservation status
- Data Deficient (IUCN 2.3)

- Critically Imperiled (NatureServe)

Scientific classification
- Kingdom: Animalia
- Phylum: Mollusca
- Class: Gastropoda
- Order: Stylommatophora
- Family: Pupillidae
- Genus: Lyropupa
- Species: L. striatula

Binomial name
- Lyropupa striatula Pease, 1871

Species of gastropod

Lyropupa striatula is a species of air-breathing land snail, terrestrial pulmonate gastropod mollusks in the family Pupillidae. This species is endemic to Hawaii and is one of the state's nine state snails.
