= Pupilla ficulnea =

Conservation status
- Near Threatened (IUCN 2.3)

Scientific classification
- Kingdom: Animalia
- Phylum: Mollusca
- Class: Gastropoda
- Order: Stylommatophora
- Family: Pupillidae
- Genus: Pupilla
- Species: P. ficulnea

Binomial name
- Pupilla ficulnea (Tate, 1894)

Species of gastropod

Pupilla ficulnea is a species of small air-breathing land snail, a terrestrial pulmonate gastropod mollusk or micromollusk in the family Pupillidae. This species is endemic to Australia.
