= Pronesopupa orycta =

Conservation status
- Data Deficient (IUCN 2.3)

Scientific classification
- Kingdom: Animalia
- Phylum: Mollusca
- Class: Gastropoda
- Order: Stylommatophora
- Family: Pupillidae
- Genus: Pronesopupa
- Species: P. orycta

Binomial name
- Pronesopupa orycta Cooke & Pilsbry, 1920

Species of gastropod

Pronesopupa orycta is a species of small air-breathing land snail, a terrestrial pulmonate gastropod mollusk in the family Pupillidae. This species is endemic to Hawaii.
