= Lyropupa perlonga =

Conservation status
- Extinct (IUCN 2.3)

- Possibly Extinct (NatureServe)

Scientific classification
- Kingdom: Animalia
- Phylum: Mollusca
- Class: Gastropoda
- Order: Stylommatophora
- Family: Pupillidae
- Genus: Lyropupa
- Species: †L. perlonga

Binomial name
- †Lyropupa perlonga Pearce

Extinct species of gastropod

Lyropupa perlonga is an extinct species of air-breathing land snail, terrestrial pulmonate gastropod mollusks in the family Pupillidae. This species was endemic to the Hawaiian Archipelago.
