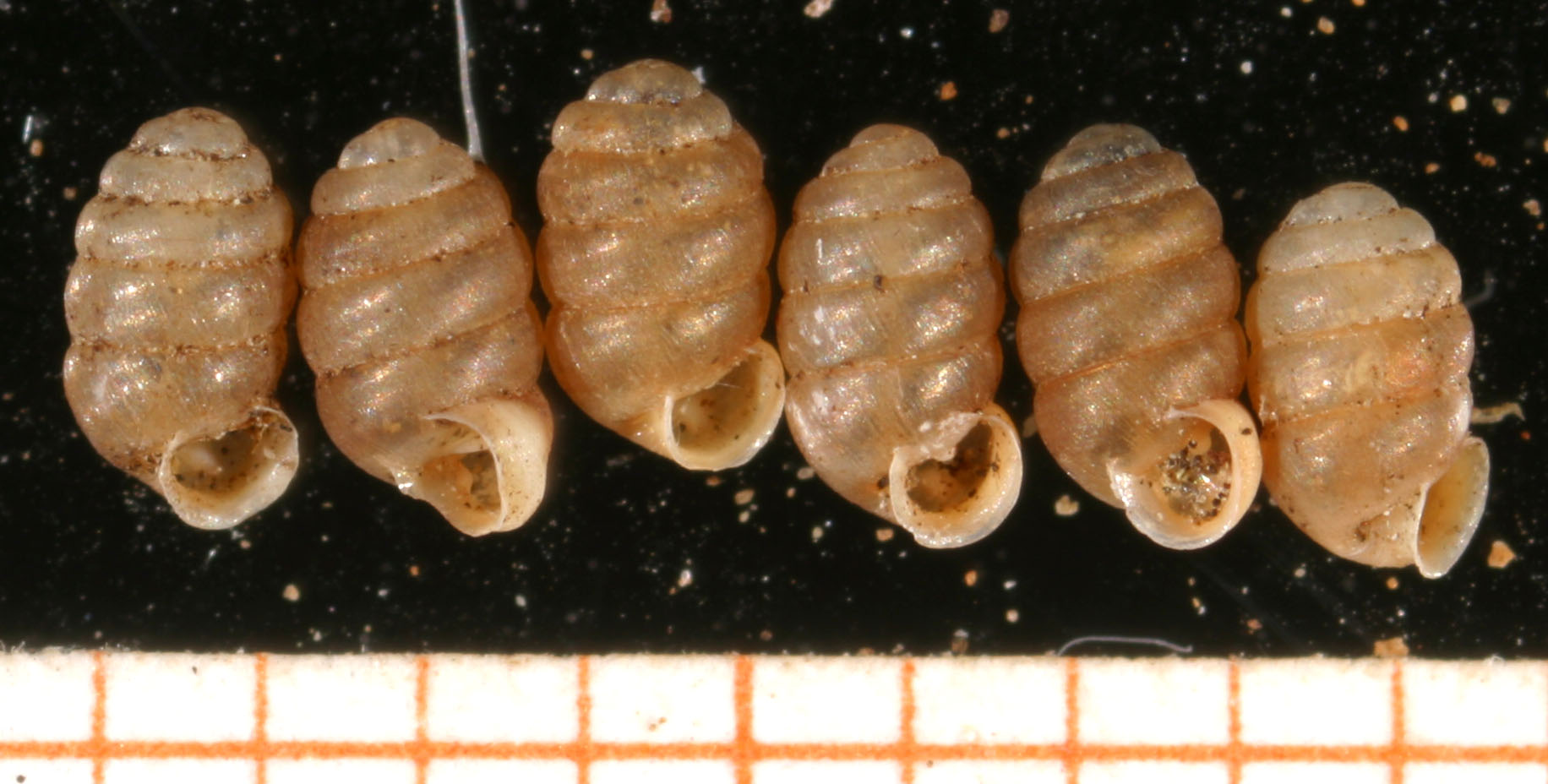
- Six shells of Pupilla triplicata, scale bar in mm

Scientific classification
- Kingdom: Animalia
- Phylum: Mollusca
- Class: Gastropoda
- Order: Stylommatophora
- Family: Pupillidae
- Genus: Pupilla
- Species: P. triplicata

Binomial name
- Pupilla triplicata (Studer, 1820)

Synonyms
- Glischrus (Pupa) triplicata Studer, 1820

= Pupilla triplicata =

Species of gastropod

Pupilla triplicata is a species of small air-breathing land snail, a terrestrial pulmonate gastropod mollusk or micromollusk in the family Pupillidae.

== Distribution ==
The distribution of this species is in Central and Southern Europe and includes Southern Europe from the Pyrenees to the Alps, the Carpathians, Crimea, Northern Turkey, Transcaucasia and Central Asia to Lake Baikal.

The species occurs in a number of countries including:

- Lower concern in Switzerland
- Endangered in Germany, extinct in Rheinland-Pfalz
- Vulnerable in Austria
- Czech Republic
- Slovakia
- Poland
- Ukraine

Pupilla triplicata has a scattered distribution, and populations in lower altitudes are threatened by habitat destruction.

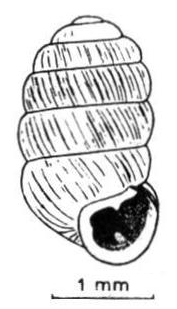
Drawing of apertural view of a shell of Pupilla triplicata

== Description ==
The shell of Pupilla triplicata is much smaller than Pupilla sterrii and the other Pupilla species. The structure of the surface is finer. Whorls are convex. The cervical callus is present but not extremely strong. There are usually 3 teeth in the aperture.

The height of the shell is 2.2-2.8 (up to 4) mm. The width of the shell is 1.4 mm (shell diameter should not exceed 1.4 mm).

== Ecology ==
Pupilla triplicata lives in grass near limestone rocks, in dry and sunny habitats, often in limestone rock rubble with xerophilous vegetation. It lives mainly between 300 and 1000 m, and in Switzerland up to 2600 m in altitude.
