= Pupilla pupula =

Conservation status
- Least Concern (IUCN 2.3)

Scientific classification
- Kingdom: Animalia
- Phylum: Mollusca
- Class: Gastropoda
- Order: Stylommatophora
- Family: Pupillidae
- Genus: Pupilla
- Species: P. pupula

Binomial name
- Pupilla pupula Deshayes, 1863

Species of gastropod

Pupilla pupula is a species of small air-breathing land snail, a terrestrial pulmonate gastropod mollusc or micromollusc in the family Pupillidae. This species is endemic to the island of Réunion in the Indian Ocean.
