= Lyropupa =

Scientific classification
- Kingdom: Animalia
- Phylum: Mollusca
- Class: Gastropoda
- Order: Stylommatophora
- Family: Pupillidae
- Genus: Lyropupa; Pilsbry, 1900

Genus of gastropods

Lyropupa is a genus of air-breathing land snails, terrestrial pulmonate gastropod mollusks in the family Pupillidae. All species except for Lyropupa striatula are extinct.

== Species ==
Species within the genus Lyropupa include:

- †Lyropupa anceyana
- †Lyropupa clathratula
- †Lyropupa hawaiiensis
- †Lyropupa lyrata
- †Lyropupa microthauma
- †Lyropupa mirabilis
- †Lyropupa perlonga
- †Lyropupa prisca
- †Lyropupa rhabdota
- †Lyropupa scabra
- †Lyropupa spaldingi
- †Lyropupa sparna
- Lyropupa striatula
- †Lyropupa thaanumi
- †Lyropupa truncata
