= Pronesopupa =

Scientific classification
- Kingdom: Animalia
- Phylum: Mollusca
- Class: Gastropoda
- Order: Stylommatophora
- Family: Pupillidae
- Genus: Pronesopupa; Iredale, 1913

Genus of gastropods

Pronesopupa is a genus of minute, air-breathing land snails, terrestrial pulmonate gastropod mollusks in the family Pupillidae.

== Species ==
Species within the genus Pronesopupa include:

- Pronesopupa acanthinula
- Pronesopupa boettgeri
- Pronesopupa frondicella
- Pronesopupa hystricella
- Pronesopupa incerta
- Pronesopupa lymaniana
- Pronesopupa molokaiensis
- Pronesopupa orycta
- Pronesopupa sericata
