= Microstele =

Scientific classification
- Kingdom: Animalia
- Phylum: Mollusca
- Class: Gastropoda
- Order: Stylommatophora
- Infraorder: Pupilloidei
- Superfamily: Pupilloidea
- Family: Pupillidae
- Genus: Microstele; O. Böttger, 1886

Synonyms
- Leucochiloides (Microstele) O. Boettger, 1886

Genus of gastropods

Microstele is a genus of minute air-breathing land snails, terrestrial pulmonate gastropod mollusks or micromollusks in the subfamily Pupillinae of the family Pupillidae.

== Species ==
- Microstele alamellata Steklov, 1966
- † Microstele buryaki Steklov, 1966
- † Microstele caucasica Steklov, 1966
- † Microstele gerardae Karnekamp, 1990
- † Microstele ikvae Prisyazhnyuk, 1971
- Microstele iredalei (Preston, 1912)
- Microstele mariae (de Morgan, 1920)
- Microstele muscerda (W.H. Benson, 1853)
- Microstele noltei (O. Böttger, 1886)
- † Microstele pingi Pilsbry, 1934 (taxon inquirendum)
- Microstele wenzi (K.Fischer, 1920)

Species brought into synonymy

- Microstele huberi Thach, 2018: synonym of Apoecus huberi (Thach, 2018) (original combination)
