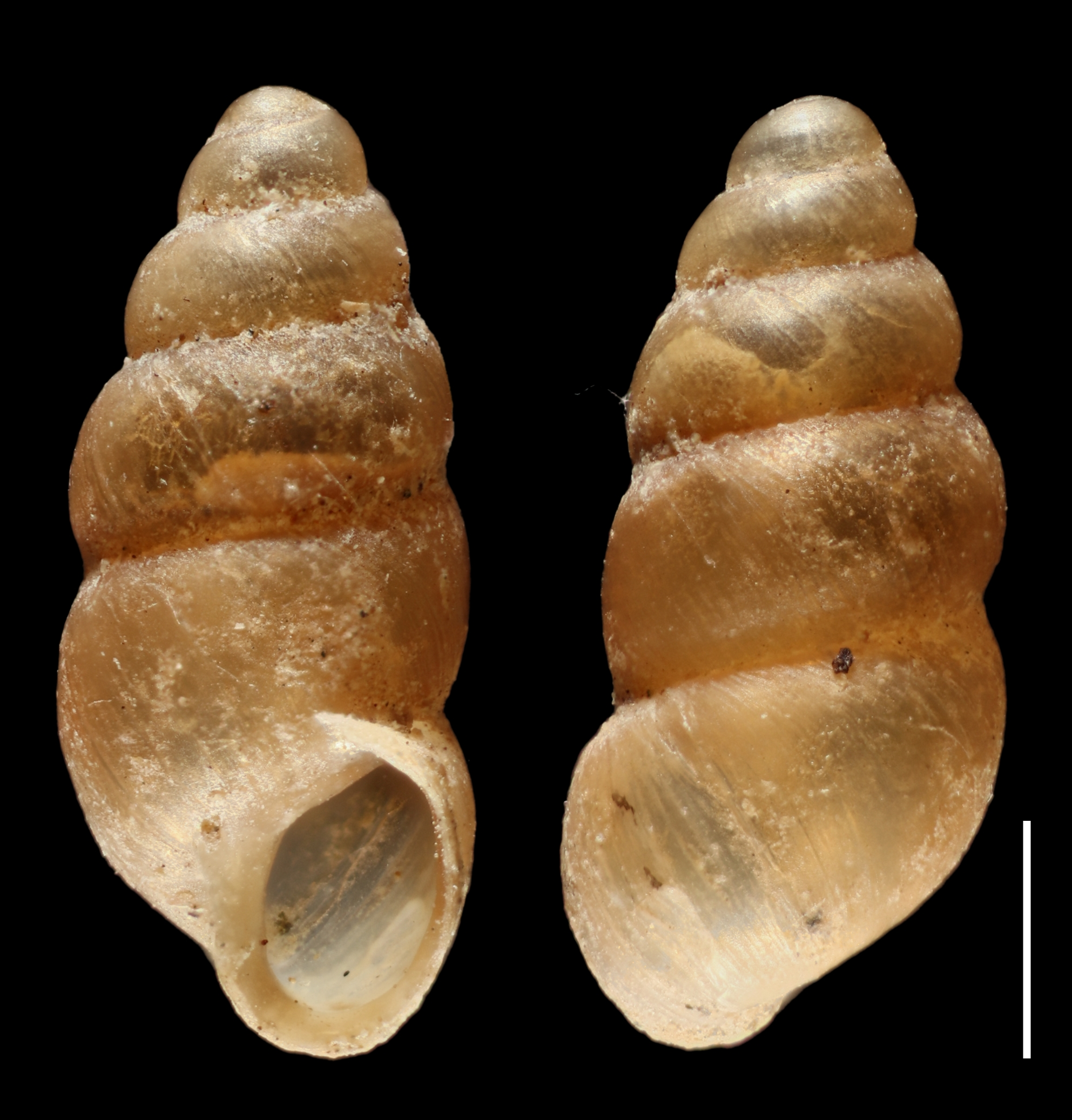
- Pupoides albilabris nitidulus

Scientific classification
- Kingdom: Animalia
- Phylum: Mollusca
- Class: Gastropoda
- Order: Stylommatophora
- Family: Pupillidae
- Genus: Pupoides; Pfeiffer, 1854

= Pupoides =

Genus of gastropods

Pupoides is a genus of land snails, terrestrial gastropod mollusks in the family Pupillidae.

== Species ==
Species within the genus Pupoides include:

- Pupoides albilabris (C. B. Adams, 1841) - white-lip dagger
- Pupoides coenopictus (Hutton, 1834)
- † Pupoides gnocco (Cabrera & Martínez, 2017)
- Pupoides hordaceus (Gabb, 1866) - ribbed dagger
- Pupoides inornatus Vanatta, 1915 - Rocky Mountain dagger
- Pupoides marginatus
  - Pupoides marginatus nitidulus (Pfeiffer, 1839) - this is the only member of the family Pupillidae in Cuba.
- Pupoides modicus (Gould, 1848) - island dagger
