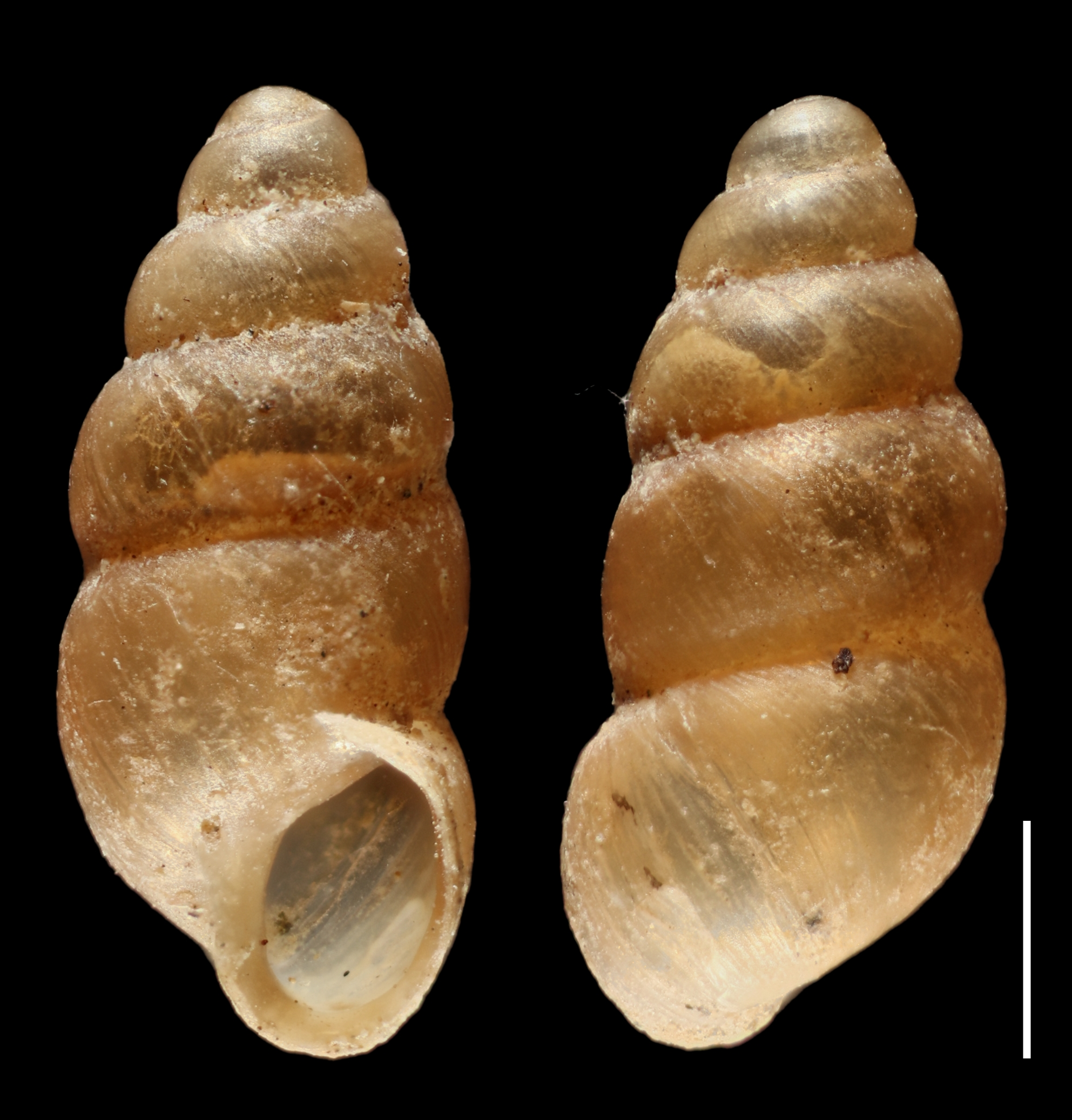

Scientific classification
- Kingdom: Animalia
- Phylum: Mollusca
- Class: Gastropoda
- Order: Stylommatophora
- Family: Pupillidae
- Genus: Pupoides
- Species: P. albilabris

Binomial name
- Pupoides albilabris (Adams, 1841)

Synonyms
- Pupoides marginatus (Say, 1821)

= Pupoides albilabris =

Species of gastropod

Pupoides albilabris is a species of gastropod belonging to the family Pupillidae.

The species is found in North and Central America.
