= Pupoidopsis =

Scientific classification
- Kingdom: Animalia
- Phylum: Mollusca
- Class: Gastropoda
- Order: Stylommatophora
- Family: Pupillidae
- Genus: Pupoidopsis; Pilsbry & Cooke, 1920

Genus of gastropods

Pupoidopsis is a genus of very small or minute air-breathing land snails, terrestrial pulmonate gastropod mollusks or micromollusks in the family Pupillidae.

== Species ==
Species within the genus Pupoidopsis include:

- Pupoidopsis hawaiensis Cooke & Pilsbry, 1920 - type species
