= Gibbulinopsis =

Scientific classification
- Kingdom: Animalia
- Phylum: Mollusca
- Class: Gastropoda
- Order: Stylommatophora
- Family: Pupillidae
- Genus: Gibbulinopsis; Germain, 1919

Genus of snails

Gibbulinopsis is a genus of gastropods belonging to the family Pupillidae.

The species of this genus are found in Asia, Africa, Australia.

Species:

- Gibbulinopsis cryptodon (Heude, 1880)
- Gibbulinopsis fontana (F.Krauss, 1848)
- Gibbulinopsis gracilis (Izzatullaev, 1970)
- Gibbulinopsis interrupta (Reinhardt, 1876)
- Gibbulinopsis nanosignata Schileyko & Izzatullaev, 1980
- Gibbulinopsis pupula (Deshayes, 1863)
- Gibbulinopsis rahti (A.Braun, 1851)
- Gibbulinopsis signata (Mousson, 1873)
- Gibbulinopsis submuscorum (Gottschick & Wenz, 1919)
