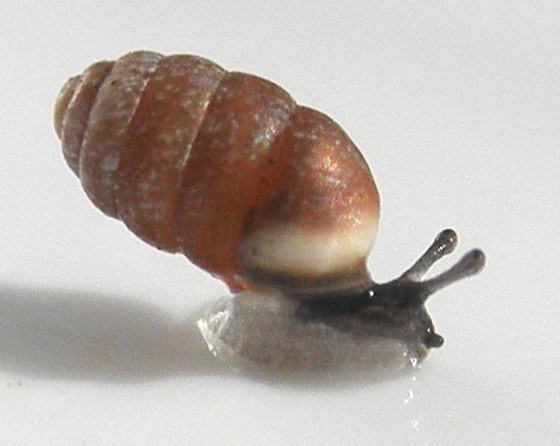
- A right side view of a live Pupilla muscorum
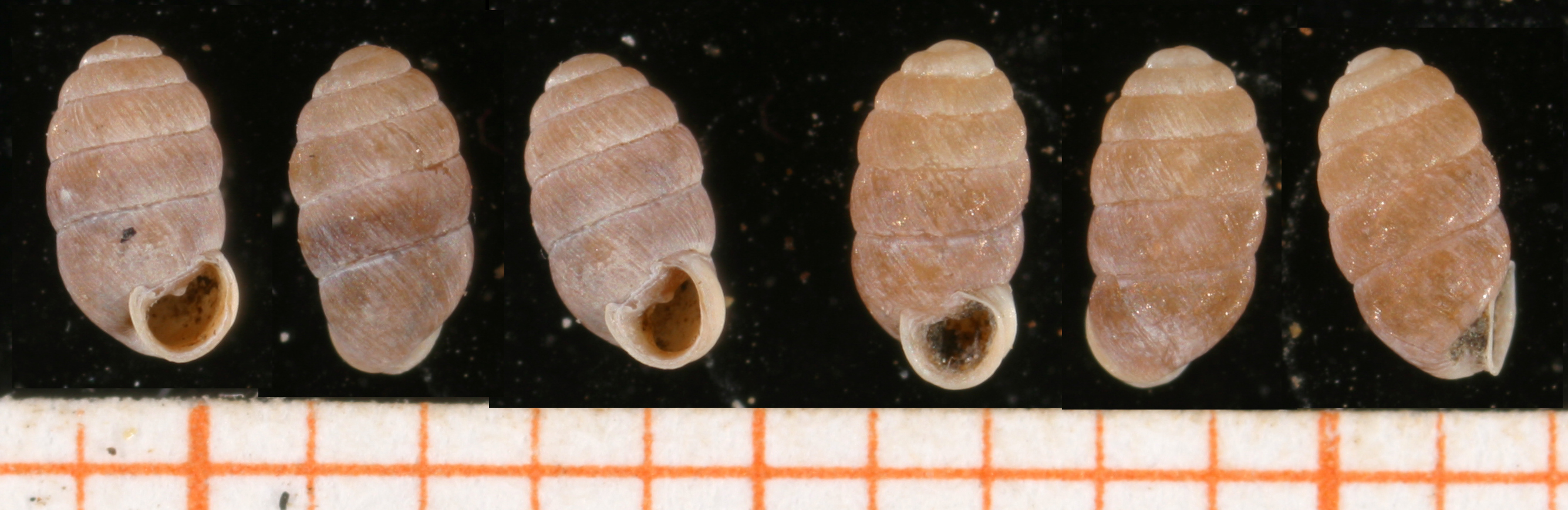
- Six shells of Pupilla muscorum, scale bar in mm

Scientific classification
- Kingdom: Animalia
- Phylum: Mollusca
- Class: Gastropoda
- Order: Stylommatophora
- Superfamily: Pupilloidea
- Family: Pupillidae
- Subfamily: Pupillinae
- Genus: Pupilla; Fleming, 1828

Type species
- Pupa marginata Draparnaud, 1801

Synonyms
- Glischrus (Pupa) Draparnaud, 1801; † Paracoryna Flach, 1890 (junior synonym); Pupa Draparnaud, 1801 (invalid: junior homonym of Pupa Röding, 1798); Pupa (Pupilla) J. Fleming, 1828; Pupilla (Afripupilla) Pilsbry, 1921· accepted, alternate representation; Pupilla (Fragipupilla) Schileyko, 1984· accepted, alternate representation; Pupilla (Pupilla) J. Fleming, 1828· accepted, alternate representation; Pupilla (Striopupilla) Pilsbry, 1921· accepted, alternate representation; Sphyradium (Pupa) Draparnaud, 1801; Torquatella Held, 1838 (junior synonym); Vertigo (Pupa) Draparnaud, 1801 (unaccepted combination)

= Pupilla =

Pupilla Temporal range: Oligocene–Holocene

Genus of gastropods

Pupilla is a genus of minute air-breathing land snails, terrestrial pulmonate gastropod mollusks or micromollusks in the subfamily Pupillinae of the family Pupillidae.

Shells of Pupilla species are known from terrestrial Cenozoic strata dating back to the Oligocene until the Holocene period.

== Distribution ==
This genus occurs in Eurasia, northern Africa and North America.

== Species ==
Species within the genus Pupilla include:

- † Pupilla aeoli (Hilber, 1884)
- Pupilla afghanicum Solem, 1979
- Pupilla alabiella Schileyko, 1984
- Pupilla alaskensis Nekola & Coles, 2014
- † Pupilla almuhambetovae Prysjazhnjuk, 2017
- Pupilla alpicola (Charpentier, 1837)
- Pupilla annandalei Pilsbry
- Pupilla anzobica Izzatullaev, 1970
- Pupilla armeniaca (Issel, 1865)
- † Pupilla bargi Prysiazhniuk, 2017
- † Pupilla belokrysi Steklov, 1966
- Pupilla bigranata (Rossmässler 1839) (taxon inquirendum)
- Pupilla bipatulata Akramowski, 1943
- † Pupilla bituberculata H.-J. Wang & S.-Y. Guo, 1991
- † Pupilla blainvilleana (Dupuy, 1850)
- Pupilla blandii E. S. Morse, 1865 – Rocky Mountain column
- † Pupilla bogdanovkaense Prysiazhniuk, 2017
- Pupilla brevicostis (Benson, 1849)
- Pupilla calacharicus (Boettger, 1886)
- † Pupilla capitani (de Morgan, 1920)
- † Pupilla crossei (Michaud, 1862)
- † Pupilla cupella O. Boettger, 1889
- † Pupilla diezi (Flach, 1890)
- Pupilla diopsis (Benson, 1863)
- Pupilla duplicata (Preston, 1911)
- Pupilla ficulnea (Tate, 1894)
- Pupilla gallae Tzvetkov, 1940
- Pupilla goniodon Pilsbry, 1927
- Pupilla guadalupensis Pilsbry, 1927
- Pupilla gutta (Benson, 1864)
- Pupilla hebes (Ancey 1881) – crestless column
- Pupilla hokkaidoensis Nekola, Coles & S. Chiba, 2014
- Pupilla hudsoniana Nekola & Coles, 2014
- Pupilla iheringi Suter, 1900
- † Pupilla impressa (F. Sandberger, 1862)
- Pupilla inequidenta Schileyko & Almuhambetova, 1979
- † Pupilla inermis Russell, 1931
- Pupilla inops (Reinhardt, 1877)
- † Pupilla iratiana (Dupuy, 1850)
- Pupilla khunjerabica Pokryszko, Auffenberg, Hlaváč & Naggs, 2009
- Pupilla kyrostriata Walther & Hausdorf, 2014
- Pupilla limata Schileyko, 1984
- Pupilla loessica Ložek, 1954
- † Pupilla michaudi Wenz, 1919
- † Pupilla mlomnickii (Friedberg, 1905)
- Pupilla muscorum (Linnaeus, 1758) – widespread column – type species
- † Pupilla mutabilis Steklov, 1966
- Pupilla obliquicosta Smith, 1892 – extinct
- Pupilla paraturcmenica Pokryszko, Auffenberg, Hlaváč & Naggs, 2009
- † Pupilla parvula (Deshayes, 1863)
- † Pupilla perlabiata Gottschick & Wenz, 1919
- † Pupilla poltavica O. Boettger, 1889
- Pupilla profundotuberculata H.-J. Wang & S.-Y. Guo, 1991
- Pupilla pupula
- Pupilla quxuensis D.-N. Chen & G.-Q. Zhang, 2001
- † Pupilla retusa (F. Sandberger, 1858)
- † Pupilla roberti Prysiazhniuk, 2017
- Pupilla salemensis (W. T. Blanford & H. F. Blanford, 1861)
- Pupilla satparanica Pokryszko, Auffenberg, Hlaváč & Naggs, 2009
- † Pupilla selecta (Thomä, 1845)
- † Pupilla selectiformis (Simionescu & Barbu, 1940)
- Pupilla seriola (Benson, 1861)
- † Pupilla shantungensis Yen, 1969
- Pupilla simplexa Y.-T. Li, 1985
- Pupilla sonorana (Sterki, 1899) – three-tooth column
- † Pupilla staszicii (Łomnicki, 1886)
- † Pupilla steinheimensis (K. Miller, 1900)
- Pupilla sterkiana (Pilsbry, 1890)
- Pupilla sterrii (Forster & Voith, 1840)
- Pupilla striopolita Schileyko, 1984
- † Pupilla subquadridens (A. d'Orbigny, 1852)
- Pupilla syngenes (Pilsbry, 1890) – top-heavy column
- Pupilla tetrodus (Boettger, 1870)
- Pupilla triplicata (Studer, 1820)
- † Pupilla triplicatoidea Steklov, 1966
- † Pupilla tschumakovi Prysjazhnjuk, 2017
- Pupilla turcmenica (O. Boettger)
- † Pupilla zeisslerae Schlickum, 1975
- Pupilla ziaratana Pokryszko, Auffenberg, Hlaváč & Naggs, 2009

== Synonyms ==
- Pupilla barrackporensis Gude, 1914: synonym of Insulipupa malayana (Issel, 1874) (junior synonym)
- Pupilla cinghalensis Gude, 1914: synonym of Indopupa cinghalensis (Gude, 1914) (original combination)
- Pupilla cryptodon (Heude, 1880): synonym of Gibbulinopsis cryptodon (Heude, 1880) (unaccepted combination)
- Pupilla cupa (Jan 1832): synonym of Pupilla muscorum (Linnaeus, 1758) (junior synonym)
- Pupilla draparnaudi Leach [in Turton], 1831: synonym of Lauria cylindracea (Da Costa, 1778)
- Pupilla floridana Dall, 1885: synonym of Gastrocopta pentodon (Say, 1822) (junior synonym)
- Pupilla fontana (Krauss, 1848): synonym of Gibbulinopsis fontana (F. Krauss, 1848) (superseded combination)
- Pupilla gracilis Izzatullaev, 1970: synonym of Gibbulinopsis gracilis (Izzatullaev, 1970) (original combination)
- Pupilla hudsonianum [sic]: synonym of Pupilla hudsoniana Nekola & Coles, 2014 (wrong gender agreement of specific epithet)
- Pupilla muscerda (Benson, 1853): synonym of Microstele muscerda (Benson, 1853) (unaccepted combination)
- Pupilla pratensis (Clessin, 1871): synonym of Pupilla alpicola (Charpentier, 1837) (unaccepted > junior subjective synonym)
- † Pupilla quadrigranata (F. Sandberger, 1858): synonym of † Pupilla selecta (Thomä, 1845) (junior synonym)
- Pupilla reibischi Dall & Ochsner, 1928: synonym of Gastrocopta reibischi (Dall & Ochsner, 1928) (original name)
- Pupilla salmensis (W. T. Blanford & H. F. Blanford, 1861): synonym of Pupilla salemensis (W. T. Blanford & H. F. Blanford, 1861) (misspelling of original name.)
- Pupilla signata (Mousson, 1873): synonym of Gibbulinopsis signata (Mousson, 1873)
- Pupilla stoneri Chamberlin & Jones, 1929: synonym of Gastrocopta pilsbryana (Sterki, 1890)
- † Pupilla submuscorum Gottschick & Wenz, 1919: synonym of † Gibbulinopsis submuscorum (Gottschick & Wenz, 1919)
- Pupilla wolfae Tzvetkov, 1940: synonym of Pupilla sterrii (Voith, 1840) (junior synonym)
