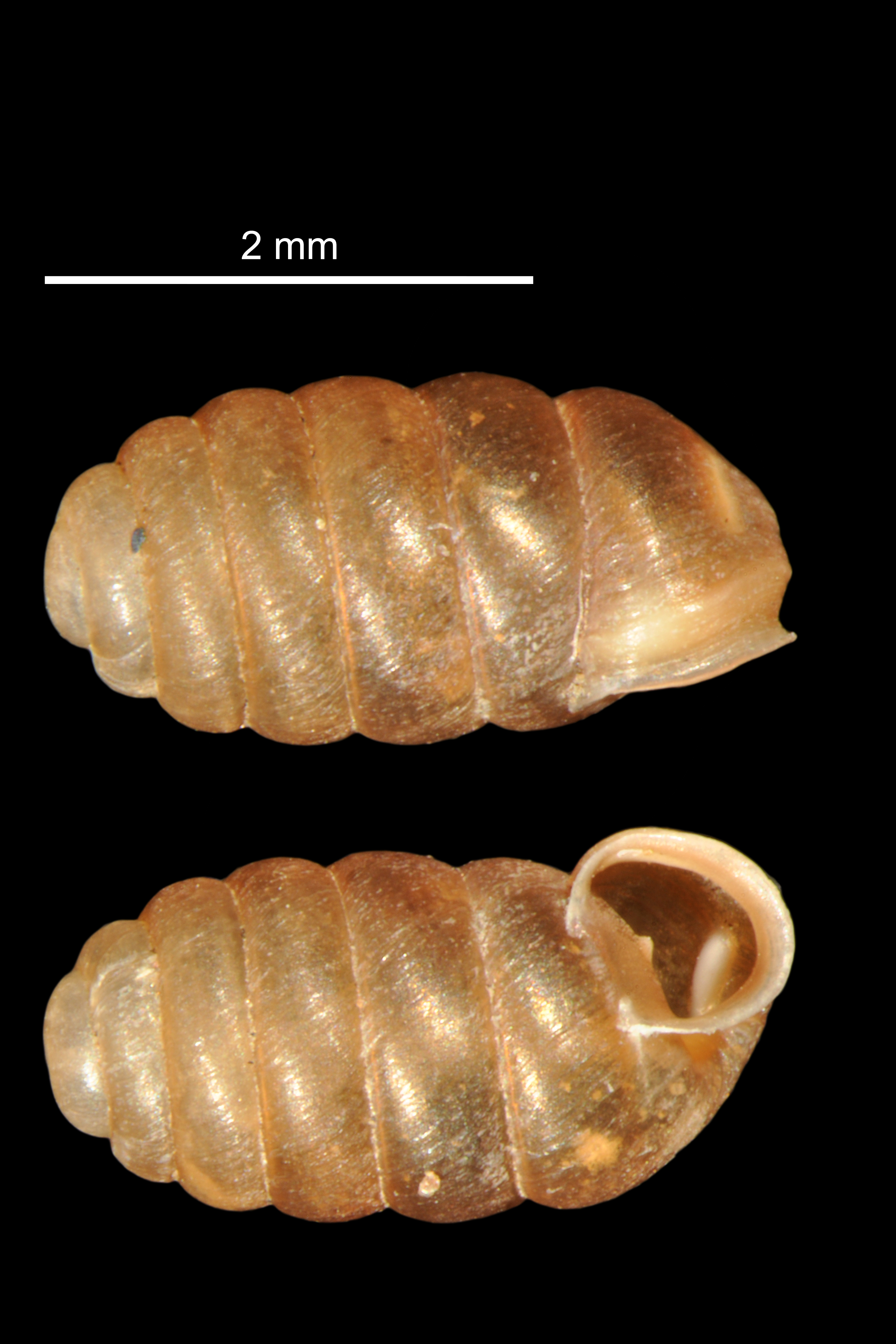
- Shell of Pupilla sterrii (specimen at MNHN, Paris)

Scientific classification
- Domain: Eukaryota
- Kingdom: Animalia
- Phylum: Mollusca
- Class: Gastropoda
- Order: Stylommatophora
- Family: Pupillidae
- Genus: Pupilla
- Species: P. sterrii

Binomial name
- Pupilla sterrii (Forster & Voith, 1840)

Synonyms
- Pupa Sterrii Forster & Voith, 1840

= Pupilla sterrii =

Species of gastropod

Pupilla sterrii is a species of small air-breathing land snail, a terrestrial pulmonate gastropod mollusk or micromollusk in the family Pupillidae.

== Distribution ==
This species has a scattered distribution and occurs in a number of areas including Eurasia: the Alps and Carpathians to Turkey and NW China

- Endangered in Germany
- Lower concern in Austria
- Lower concern in Switzerland
- Italy
- Vulnerable in the Czech Republic
- Slovakia
- Poland
- Ukraine

In lower altitudes the species is threatened by continuous habitat destructions.

== Description ==
The shell is light horny coloured, weathering grey, finely ribbed. Whorls are strongly convex with deep suture. The aperture is with 2 teeth.

The height of the shell is 2.8-3.5 mm. The width of the shell is 1.6 mm.

|

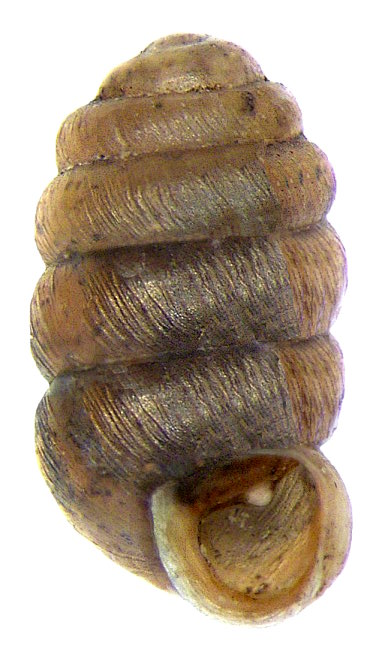
Photo of the shell Pupilla sterrii

== Ecology ==
Pupilla sterrii lives in grass in very dry and sunny areas of limestone rock, between stones, and on dry meadows on calcareous substrate. In north Italy it occurs up to 2800 m.

This species is Ovoviviparous.
