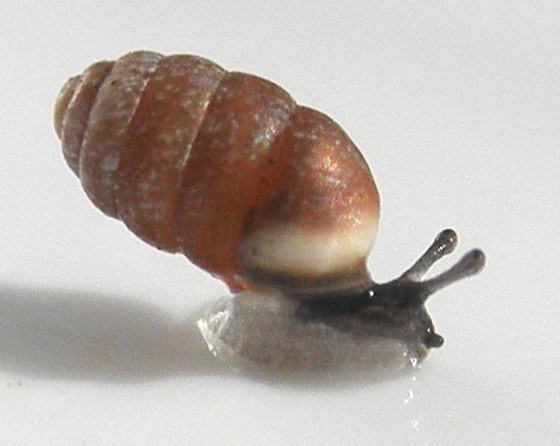
- A right side view of a live Pupilla muscorum
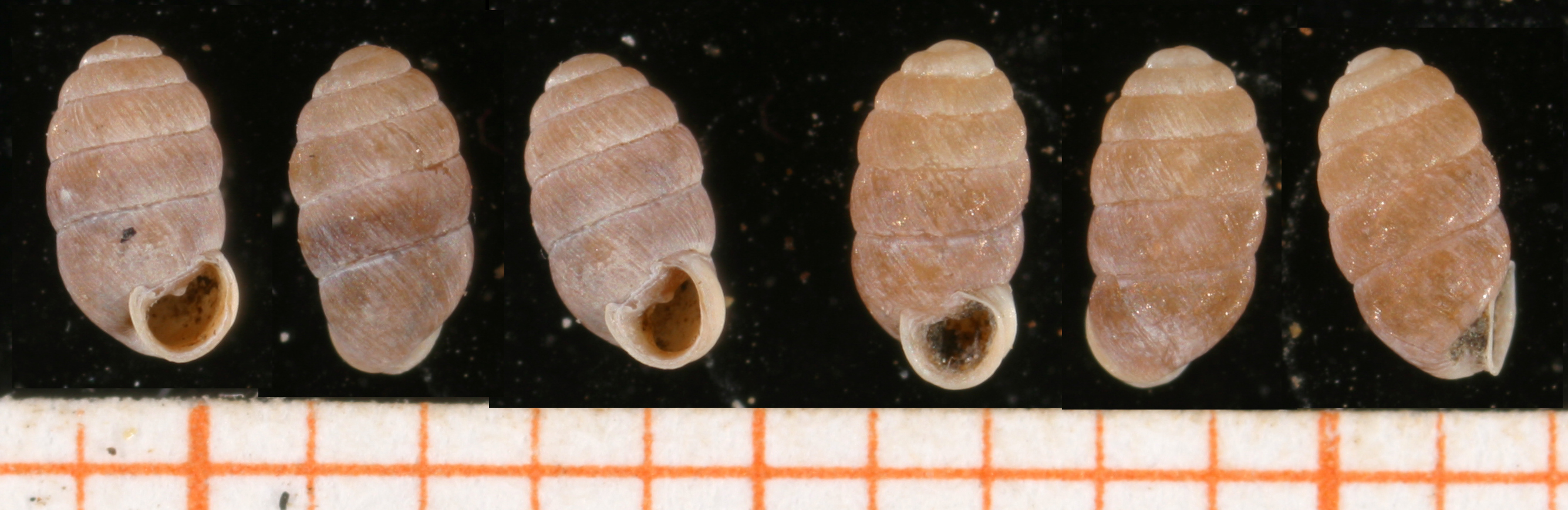
- Six shells of Pupilla muscorum, scale bar in mm

Conservation status
- Least Concern (IUCN 3.1)

- Secure (NatureServe)

Scientific classification
- Kingdom: Animalia
- Phylum: Mollusca
- Class: Gastropoda
- Order: Stylommatophora
- Family: Pupillidae
- Genus: Pupilla
- Species: P. muscorum

Binomial name
- Pupilla muscorum (Linnaeus, 1758)

Synonyms
- Turbo muscorum Linnaeus, 1758; Pupa marginata Draparnaud, 1801

= Pupilla muscorum =

Species of gastropod

Pupilla muscorum, commonly known as the Moss Chrysalis snail or widespread column, is a species of small air-breathing land snail, a terrestrial pulmonate gastropod mollusk or micromollusk in the family Pupillidae.

== Taxonomy ==
A variety Pupilla muscorum var. pratensis Clessin, 1871 considered as ecophenotype of Pupilla muscorum was elevated to its species level Pupilla pratensis in 2009.

== Description ==
The shell is usually light brown, varies from reddish brown to horny grey, weakly striated or almost smooth, 5–6.5 weakly convex whorls, suture not very deep (deep suture is presented in Pupilla sterrii – see picture below), aperture usually with well-developed lip, cervical callus strongly developed, like a dam, parietal tooth usually present, palatal tooth sometimes too.

Pupilla muscorum differs from Pupilla pratensis with which it lives sympatrically, in its thicker, smaller and more slender shell, lighter and more variable colour and stronger apertural lip.

The animal of Pupilla muscorum is small, elliptical, dark with lighter sides and foot, upper tentacles not very long, lower tentacles very short.

Extant populations of P. muscorum are practically identical in shape to their ancestors, indicating that they have tracked their ecological niches over time.

The height of the shell is 3.0–4.0 mm. The width of the shell is 1.65–1.75 mm (shell diameter does not vary much).

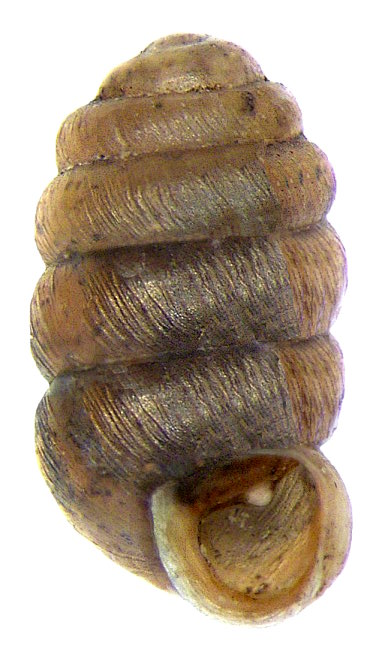
Photo of the shell Pupilla sterrii with deep sutures

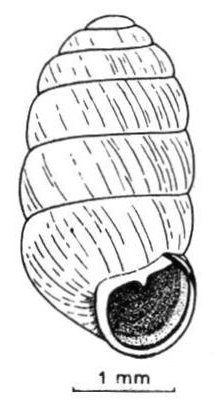
Drawing of the shell – typical view of Pupilla muscorum with shallow sutures.

== Distribution ==
This species of land snail occurs in the Northern Hemisphere including almost all of Europe. It is recorded as present in countries and islands including:

- Great Britain. It is threatened by disturbance due to intensification of land use of old calcareous grasslands in Britain.
- Ireland
- lower concern in Austria. Vulnerable in Vorarlberg.
- lower concern in Germany, decreasing (4R) in Bavaria.
- Czech Republic
- Slovakia
- Ukraine and Crimea
- Pakistan
- Michigan, USA
- Utah, USA
- Vermont, USA

== Ecology ==
Pupilla muscorum lives in dry meadows, sand dunes, in open and sunny habitats. Calciphile. In Portugal it is found under stones, dead leaves and in mosses. In Britain it is frequent in sheep-grazed calcareous grasslands. In the Alps in up to 2,400 m (7,870 ft), in Bulgaria 1,200 m (3,940 ft).

Ovoviviparous, the species is able to hibernate with its eggs, and can then release eggs with partly grown embryos during more favourable seasons.
