= Ecophenotypic variation =

Ecophenotypic variation ("ecophenotype") refers to phenotypical variation as a function of life station. In wide-ranging species, the contributions of heredity and environment are not always certain, but their interplay can sometimes be determined by experiment.

== Plants ==
Plants display the most obvious examples of ecophenotypic variation. One example are trees growing in the woods developing long straight trunks, with branching crowns high in the canopy, while the same species growing alone in the open develops a spreading form, branching much lower to the ground. Genotypes often have much flexibility in the modification and expression of phenotypes; in many organisms these phenotypes are very different under varying environmental conditions. The plant Hieracium umbellatum is found growing in two different habitats in Sweden. One habitat is rocky sea-side cliffs, where the plants are bushy with broad leaves and expanded inflorescences; the other is among sand dunes where the plants grow prostrate with narrow leaves and compact inflorescences. These habitats alternate along the coast of Sweden and the habitat that the seeds of H. umbellatum land in determines the phenotype that grows. Invasive plants such as the honeysuckle can thrive by altering their morphology in response to changes in the environment, which gives them a competitive advantage. Another example of a plants phenotypic reaction and adaptation with its environment is how Thlaspi caerulescens can absorb the metals in the soil to use to its advantage in defending against harmful microbes and bacteria in its leaves. The more immediate responses shown by vascular plants to their environment, for instance a vine's ability to conform to the wall or tree upon which it grows, are not usually considered ecophenotypic, even though the mechanisms may be related.

== Animals ==
Since animals are far less plastic than plants, ecophenotypic variation is noteworthy. When encountered, it can cause confusion in identification if it is not anticipated. The most obvious examples are again common observations, as the dwarfing of aquarium fish living in a restricted environment. In asexual reproduction, the parent passes on the entire genome to the next generation. Mutations to the genes are the only source of genetic variation. In sexual reproduction, each parent contributes half of his or her genome to the offspring; thus the offspring contain a mixture of genetic material. Adaptations are traits that increase fitness, the driving force for natural selection. The level of fitness associated with an allele can only be ascertained by comparison with alternate alleles. Traits that increase the survival rate of a species contribute to an animal's fitness, but selection will only favor such traits insofar as survival improves the reproductive success of the organism. More interesting are examples where causation is less clear. Among mollusks, examples include the muricid snail species Nucella lamellosa, which in rough, shallow waters is generally less spiny than in deeper, quiet waters. In unionid freshwater bivalves, there are lake, small river, and large river forms of several species. In vertebrates, experiments on mice show reduced length of ears and tails in response to being reared in a lower temperature, a phenomenon known as Allen's rule.

== Humans ==
In humans, environmental differences due to lifestyle choices are a consideration, for instance the differences between someone who spends much time on the sofa before the television, beer in hand, and an individual who spends his time in the gym or the soccer field can be pronounced. Franz Boas found that cephalic index was to some degree dependent on where a child was born, independent of the child's genetic or cultural heritage. Another way in which environmental differences can cause physical and/or behavioral alterations is in being put under great levels of stress, causing a wide range of effects. Chronic Stress has been proven to cause health issues in many individuals. "Early childhood attempts to cope with fear or rejection ... set up psychological patterns of behavior for the person's later life. Those behaviors in turn affect the biochemical imbalances in the brain's neuronal systems. Those altered imbalances in turn reinforce the behaviors, and the cycle feeds upon itself." "The body reacts biochemically to excessive stress as it attempts to regain its healthy dynamic balance"; "In psychologically stressful situations, hormones may be brought into play to remedy the imbalance the body finds itself in."

In the General Adaption Syndrome, which is the biological response to stress, there are three stages. 1.) The "Alarm Action" - heart rate increases, blood sugar levels rise, pupils dilate, and digestion slows. 2.) The "Resistance" or "Adaptive" stage - The body attempts to repair the damage which caused the emergency arousal 3.) The "Exhaustion Stage" - The body grows ill; Mentally, possibly by neurosis or even psychotic disturbances, or physically, having the possibility to trigger several kinds of cardiovascular and kidney diseases, and Quite commonly, certain forms of asthma.
