= Kobylno =

Kobylno Kobyllno
- Village
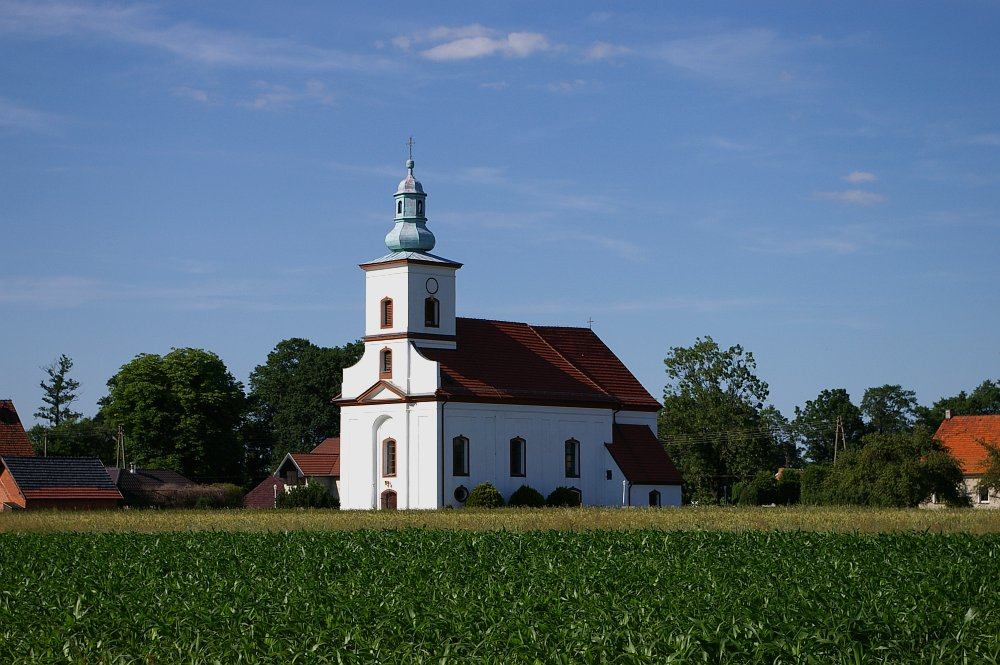

- Location within Poland
- Coordinates: 50°48′N 18°6′E
- Country: Poland
- Voivodeship: Opole
- County: Opole
- Gmina: Łubniany
- Postal code: 46-024

Kobylno ([kɔˈbɨlnɔ], additional name in German: Kobyllno) is a village in the administrative district of Gmina Łubniany, within Opole County, Opole Voivodeship, in south-western Poland.
