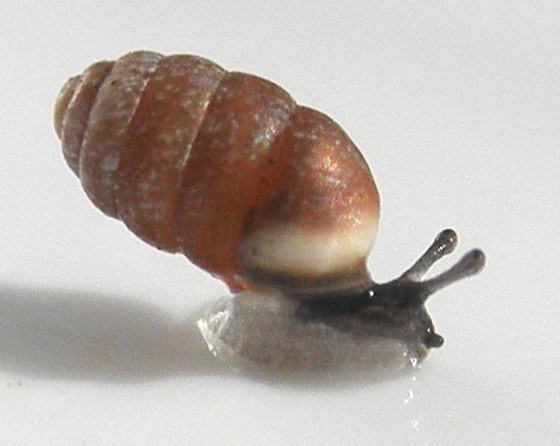
- A right side view of a live Pupilla muscorum
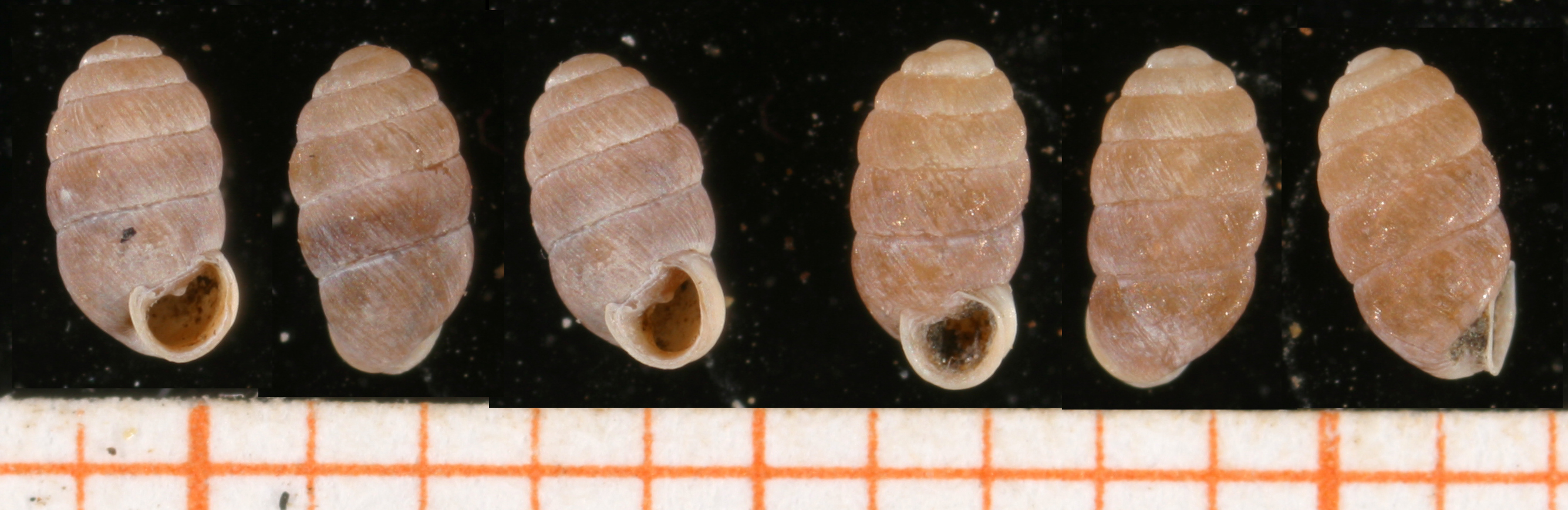
- Six shells of Pupilla muscorum. The scale bar is in mm.

Scientific classification
- Kingdom: Animalia
- Phylum: Mollusca
- Class: Gastropoda
- Order: Stylommatophora
- Suborder: Helicina
- Infraorder: Pupilloidei
- Superfamily: Pupilloidea
- Family: Pupillidae; Turton, 1831

Synonyms
- Pupinae Flemming, 1828 (inv.); Pupoididae Iredale, 1939

= Pupillidae =

Pupillidae Temporal range: Paleocene–Recent

Family of gastropods

Pupillidae is a family of mostly minute, air-breathing, land snails, terrestrial pulmonate gastropod mollusks or micromollusks in the superfamily Pupilloidea.

This family has two subfamilies (according to the taxonomy of the Gastropoda by Bouchet & Rocroi, 2005).: Pupillinae W. Turton, 1831 and Pupoidinae Iredale, 1940.

== Distribution ==
Pupoides marginatus is endemic to Cuba. The type genus, Pupilla, in direct contrast, has numerous living and extinct species found in Europe, Northern Africa, North America and South-East Asia.

== Anatomy ==
In this family, the number of haploid chromosomes lies between 26 and 30 (according to the values in this table).

== Genera ==
Genera within the family Pupillidae include:

- † Albertanella Russell, 1931

Subfamily Pupillinae W. Turton, 1831

- Gibbulinopsis Germain, 1919
- Microstele O. Boettger, 1886
- Omegapilla Iredale, 1937
- Pupilla Fleming, 1828 - type genus of the family Pupillidae

Subfamily Pupoidinae Iredale, 1940

- Corena A. Adams, 1870
- Glyptopupoides Pilsbry, 1926
- Pupoides Pfeiffer, 1854
- Pupoidopsis Pilsbry & Cooke, 1920

Genera brought into synonymy

- Australbinula Pilsbry, 1916: synonym of Gastrocopta Wollaston, 1878 (junior synonym)
- Famarinia Iredale, 1933: synonym of Glyptopupoides Pilsbry, 1926 (invalid: nomen nudum)
- Gyrodaria Iredale, 1940: synonym of Gastrocopta Wollaston, 1878
- Leucochila E. von Martens, 1860: synonym of Pupoides L. Pfeiffer, 1854
- Leucochiloides L. Pfeiffer, 1879: synonym of Pupoides L. Pfeiffer, 1854
- Papualbinula Iredale, 1941: synonym of Australbinula Pilsbry, 1916: synonym of Gastrocopta Wollaston, 1878
- † Paracoryna Flach, 1890: synonym of Pupilla J. Fleming, 1828 (junior synonym)
- Pupa Draparnaud, 1801: synonym of Pupilla J. Fleming, 1828 (invalid: junior homonym of Pupa Röding, 1798)
- Sterkia Pilsbry, 1898 / or in Vertiginidae: synonym of Vertigo O. F. Müller, 1773
- Themapupa Iredale, 1930: synonym of Pupoides L. Pfeiffer, 1854
- Torquatella Held, 1838: synonym of Pupilla J. Fleming, 1828
- Wallivertilla Iredale, 1937: synonym of Cylindrovertilla O. Boettger, 1881 (junior synonym)
