= List of non-marine molluscs of the Netherlands =

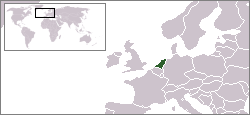
Location of the Netherlands

This list of non-marine molluscs of the Netherlands is a list of all molluscs other than the marine (salt water) species that live in the Netherlands. This list comprises land snails and slugs, freshwater snails and freshwater clams and mussels. There are 197 non-marine mollusc species living in natural habitats in the Netherlands.

There are 169 gastropod (snail and slug) species (52 freshwater and 117 land species), and 28 freshwater bivalve (clams and mussel) species living in the wild.

As for introduced species, there are 23 introduced gastropod species (2 freshwater and 21 land species plus Candidula unifasciata as possibly non-indigenous one), and 4 bivalve species, living in natural habitats in the Netherlands. A total of 5 freshwater non-indigenous species live in natural habitats.

Summary table of number of species

	Netherlands
freshwater gastropods	52
land gastropods	117
gastropod total	169 (freshwater and land)
freshwater bivalves	28
mollusc total	197 (non-marine species only)
non-indigenous gastropods in natural habitats	2 freshwater and 21 land
non-indigenous gastropods in synanthropic habitats	0
non-indigenous bivalves in natural habitats	4
non-indigenous bivalves in synanthropic habitats	0
total of non-indigenous molluscs living in natural habitats	27

There are 4 locally extinct species in the Netherlands: the marine gastropod Rissoa membranacea, land gastropod Spermodea lamellata, and freshwater bivalves Unio crassus and Pisidium tenuilineatum.

== Systematic list ==
This list includes only orders, families and species. (Non-indigenous species only occurring greenhouses in the Netherlands are noted separately, below the main list.)

The source for this list is: CLECOM-PROJECT: Checklist of species-group taxa of continental Mollusca living in the Netherlands (CLECOM Section I) 14-07-2002

=== Gastropoda ===
Neritopsina
Neritidae

- Theodoxus fluviatilis (Linnaeus, 1758)

Architaenioglossa
Aciculidae

- Acicula fusca (Montagu, 1803)
- Platyla polita polita (Hartmann, 1840)

Viviparidae

- Viviparus acerosus (Bourguignat, 1862) - non-indigenous since 2007
- Viviparus contectus (Millet, 1813)
- Viviparus viviparus viviparus (Linnaeus, 1758)

Neotaenioglossa
Thiaridae

- Melanoides tuberculata (O. F. Müller, 1774)

Pomatiidae

- Pomatias elegans (O. F. Müller, 1774)

Bithyniidae

- Bithynia leachii (Sheppard, 1823)
- Bithynia tentaculata (Linnaeus, 1758)

Hydrobiidae

- Potamopyrgus antipodarum (Gray, 1843) - non-indigenous
- Hydrobia ventrosa (Montagu, 1803)
- Peringia ulvae (Pennant, 1777)
- Mercuria anatina (Poiret, 1801)
- Heleobia stagnorum (Gmelin, 1791)
- Bythiospeum husmanni (C. Boettger, 1963)
- Avenionia roberti Boeters, 1967
- Lithoglyphus naticoides (C. Pfeiffer, 1828) - non-indigenous
- Marstoniopsis scholtzi (A. Schmidt, 1856)
- Bythinella dunkeri (Frauenfeld, 1857)

Assimineidae

- Assiminea grayana Fleming, 1828

Ectobranchia
Valvatidae

- Valvata cristata O. F. Müller, 1774
- Valvata macrostoma Mörch, 1864
- Valvata piscinalis piscinalis (O. F. Müller, 1774), Valvata piscinalis antiqua Morris, 1838

Pulmonata
Acroloxidae

- Acroloxus lacustris (Linnaeus, 1758)

Lymnaeidae

- Galba truncatula (O. F. Müller, 1774)
- Stagnicola palustris (O. F. Müller, 1774)
- Stagnicola fuscus (C. Pfeiffer, 1821)
- Stagnicola corvus (Gmelin, 1791)
- Omphiscola glabra (O. F. Müller, 1774)
- Radix auricularia auricularia (Linnaeus, 1758)
- Radix labiata (Rossmässler, 1835)
- Radix balthica (Linnaeus, 1758)
- Myxas glutinosa (O. F. Müller, 1774)
- Lymnaea stagnalis (Linnaeus, 1758)

Physidae

- Physa fontinalis (Linnaeus, 1758)
- Physella acuta (Draparnaud, 1805) - non-indigenous, synonym Physella heterostropha (Say, 1817)
- Aplexa hypnorum (Linnaeus, 1758)

Planorbidae

- Planorbarius corneus corneus (Linnaeus, 1758)
- Menetus dilatatus (Gould, 1841) - non-indigenous
- Ferrissia fragilis (Tryon, 1863) - syn. Ferrissia clessiniana (Jickeli, 1882)
- Planorbis planorbis (Linnaeus, 1758)
- Planorbis carinatus O. F. Müller, 1774
- Anisus spirorbis (Linnaeus, 1758)
- Anisus septemgyratus (Rossmässler, 1835) (syn.: Anisus leucostoma (Millet, 1813))
- Anisus vortex (Linnaeus, 1758)
- Anisus vorticulus (Troschel, 1834)
- Bathyomphalus contortus (Linnaeus, 1758)
- Gyraulus albus (O. F. Müller, 1774)
- Gyraulus chinensis (Dunker, 1848) - non-indigenous
- Gyraulus laevis (Alder, 1838)
- Gyraulus riparius (Westerlund, 1865)
- Gyraulus crista (Linnaeus, 1758)
- Hippeutis complanatus (Linnaeus, 1758)
- Segmentina nitida (O. F. Müller, 1774)
- Ancylus fluviatilis O. F. Müller, 1774

Ellobiidae

- Myosotella myosotis (Draparnaud, 1801)
- Myosotella denticulata (Montagu, 1803)
- Leucophytia bidentata (Montagu, 1808)
- Carychium minimum O. F. Müller, 1774
- Carychium tridentatum (Risso, 1826)

Succineidae

- Succinea putris (Linnaeus, 1758)
- Succinella oblonga oblonga (Draparnaud, 1801)
- Oxyloma elegans elegans (Risso, 1826)
- Oxyloma sarsii (Esmark, 1886)
- Quickella arenaria (Potiez et Michaud, 1835)

Cochlicopidae

- Cochlicopa lubrica (O. F. Müller, 1774) - Cochlicopa repentina Hudec, 1960 is a form of Cochlicopa lubrica.
- Cochlicopa lubricella (Rossmässler, 1835)

Lauriidae

- Lauria cylindracea (Da Costa, 1778) non-indigenous

Orculidae

- Sphyradium doliolum (Bruguière, 1792)

Valloniidae

- Vallonia costata (O. F. Müller, 1774)
- Vallonia pulchella (O. F. Müller, 1774)
- Vallonia excentrica Sterki, 1893
- Acanthinula aculeata (O. F. Müller, 1774)
- Spermodea lamellata Jeffreys, 1830 recently not observed

Pupillidae

- Pupilla muscorum (Linnaeus, 1758)

Vertiginidae

- Columella edentula (Draparnaud, 1805)
- Columella aspera Waldén, 1966
- Truncatellina cylindrica (A. Férussac, 1807)
- Vertigo pusilla O. F. Müller, 1774
- Vertigo antivertigo (Draparnaud, 1801)
- Vertigo substriata (Jeffreys, 1833)
- Vertigo pygmaea (Draparnaud, 1801)
- Vertigo moulinsiana (Dupuy, 1849)
- Vertigo angustior Jeffreys, 1830

Enidae

- Merdigera obscura (O. F. Müller, 1774)

Clausiliidae

- Cochlodina laminata laminata (Montagu, 1803)
- Macrogastra rolphii (Turton, 1826)
- Macrogastra attenuata subspecies lineolata (Held, 1836)
- Clausilia rugosa subspecies parvula (A. Férussac, 1807)
- Clausilia bidentata bidentata (Ström, 1765)
- Clausilia dubia dubia Draparnaud, 1805
- Balea perversa (Linnaeus, 1758)
- Balea sarsii Pfeiffer, 1847
- Alinda biplicata biplicata (Montagu, 1803) non-indigenous

Ferussaciidae

- Cecilioides acicula (O. F. Müller, 1774) non-indigenous

Punctidae

- Punctum pygmaeum (Draparnaud, 1801)
- Paralaoma servilis (Shuttleworth, 1852) non-indigenous

Helicodiscidae

- Lucilla scintilla (R.T. Lowe, 1852) non-indigenous

Discidae

- Discus rotundatus (O. F. Müller, 1774)

Pristilomatidae

- Vitrea contracta (Westerlund, 1871)
- Vitrea crystallina (O. F. Müller, 1774)

Euconulidae

- Euconulus fulvus (O. F. Müller, 1774)
- Euconulus trochiformis (Montagu, 1803)
- Euconulus praticola (Reinhardt, 1883)

Gastrodontidae

- Zonitoides nitidus (O. F. Müller, 1774)
- Zonitoides excavatus (Alder, 1830)

Oxychilidae

- Oxychilus alliarius (Miller, 1822)
- Oxychilus cellarius (O. F. Müller, 1774)
- Oxychilus draparnaudi draparnaudi (Beck, 1837) non-indigenous
- Oxychilus navarricus helveticus (Blum, 1881) non-indigenous
- Aegopinella nitidula (Draparnaud, 1805)
- Aegopinella nitens (Michaud, 1831) - non-indigenous
- Aegopinella pura (Alder, 1830)
- Perpolita hammonis (Ström, 1765)

Milacidae

- Milax gagates (Draparnaud, 1801)
- Milax nigricans (Philippi, 1836) non-indigenous since 1999
- Tandonia rustica (Millet, 1843)
- Tandonia budapestensis (Hazay, 1881)
- Tandonia sowerbyi (A. Férussac, 1823)

Vitrinidae

- Vitrinobrachium breve (A. Férussac, 1821)
- Eucobresia diaphana (Draparnaud, 1805)
- Vitrina pellucida (O. F. Müller, 1774)
- Phenacolimax major (A. Férussac, 1807)

Boettgerillidae

- Boettgerilla pallens Simroth, 1912 - non-indigenous

Limacidae

- Limax maximus Linnaeus, 1758
- Limax cinereoniger Wolf, 1803
- Limacus flavus (Linnaeus, 1758)
- Malacolimax tenellus (O. F. Müller, 1774)
- Lehmannia marginata (O. F. Müller, 1774)
- Lehmannia valentiana (A. Férussac, 1822)

Agriolimacidae

- Deroceras laeve (O. F. Müller, 1774)
- Deroceras sturanyi (Simroth, 1894)
- Deroceras panormitanum (Lessona et Pollonera, 1882)
- Deroceras agreste (Linnaeus, 1758)
- Deroceras reticulatum (O. F. Müller, 1774)

Arionidae

- Arion rufus (Linnaeus, 1758)
- Arion lusitanicus Mabille, 1868 - non-indigenous
- Arion fuscus (O.F. Müller, 1774)
- Arion circumscriptus Johnston, 1828
- Arion silvaticus Lohmander, 1937
- Arion hortensis A. Férussac, 1819
- Arion distinctus J. Mabille, 1868
- Arion intermedius (Normand, 1852)

Bradybaenidae

- Fruticicola fruticum (O. F. Müller, 1774)

Helicodontidae

- Helicodonta obvoluta subspecies obvoluta (O. F. Müller, 1774)

Cochlicellidae

- Cochlicella acuta (O. F. Müller, 1774) - non-indigenous
- Cochlicella barbara (Linnaeus, 1758)- non-indigenous

Hygromiidae

- Monacha cantiana (Montagu, 1803) - non-indigenous
- Monacha cartusiana (O. F. Müller, 1774 - non-indigenous
- Trochulus hispidus (Linnaeus, 1758)
- Trochulus striolatus abludens (Locard, 1888) - indigenous?
- Helicella itala (Linnaeus, 1758)
- Candidula unifasciata unifasciata (Poiret, 1801) - non-indigenous?
- Candidula intersecta (Poiret, 1801) - non-indigenous
- Candidula gigaxii (L. Pfeiffer, 1850) - non-indigenous
- Hygromia cinctella (Draparnaud, 1801) - non-indigenous
- Cernuella virgata (Da Costa, 1778) - non-indigenous
- Cernuella cisalpina (Rossmässler, 1837) - non-indigenous
- Cernuella aginnica (Locard, 1894) - non-indigenous
- Cernuella neglecta (Draparnaud, 1805) - non-indigenous
- Pseudotrichia rubiginosa (Rossmässler, 1838)
- Monachoides incarnatus (O. F. Müller, 1774)

Helicidae

- Arianta arbustorum arbustorum (Linnaeus, 1758)
- Helicigona lapicida lapicida (Linnaeus, 1758)
- Theba pisana pisana (O. F. Müller, 1774) - non-indigenous
- Cepaea nemoralis nemoralis (Linnaeus, 1758)
- Cepaea hortensis (O. F. Müller, 1774)
- Cornu aspersum aspersum (O.F. Müller, 1774) - non-indigenous
- Helix pomatia Linnaeus, 1758 - non-indigenous

=== Bivalvia ===
Unionoida
Unionidae

- Unio pictorum pictorum (Linnaeus, 1758)
- Unio tumidus depressus (Donovan, 1802)
- Unio crassus Philipsson, 1788 - recently not observed
- Anodonta anatina anatina (Linnaeus, 1758)
- Anodonta cygnea cygnea (Linnaeus, 1758)
- Pseudanodonta complanata elongata (Holandre, 1836)

Veneroida
Corbiculidae

- Corbicula fluminea (O. F. Müller, 1774) - non-indigenous

Sphaeriidae

- Sphaerium corneum (Linnaeus, 1758)
- Sphaerium nucleus (S. Studer, 1820)
- Sphaerium rivicola (Lamarck, 1818)
- Sphaerium solidum (Normand, 1844)
- Musculium lacustre (O. F. Müller, 1774)
- Musculium transversum (Say, 1829) - non-indigenous
- Pisidium amnicum (O. F. Müller, 1774)
- Pisidium casertanum (Poli, 1791)
- Pisidium personatum Malm, 1855
- Pisidium obtusale obtusale (Lamarck, 1818)
- Pisidium henslowanum (Sheppard, 1823)
- Pisidium supinum A. Schmidt, 1851
- Pisidium hibernicum Westerlund, 1894
- Pisidium nitidum Jenyns, 1832
- Pisidium pseudosphaerium Favre, 1927
- Pisidium milium Held, 1836
- Pisidium subtruncatum Malm, 1855
- Pisidium pulchellum (Jenyns, 1832)
- Pisidium tenuilineatum Stelfox, 1918 - recently not observed
- Pisidium moitessierianum Paladilhe, 1866

Dreissenidae

- Dreissena polymorpha (Pallas, 1771) - non-indigenous
- Mytilopsis leucophaeata (Conrad, 1831)

== List of synanthropic species in the Netherlands ==
These species do not live in the wild or are not recorded in the wild yet, but live in greenhouses and similar biotopes.

List (alphabetically according to their scientific name):

== See also ==
- List of extinct animals of the Netherlands
- List of non-marine molluscs of Belgium
- List of non-marine molluscs of Great Britain
- List of non-marine molluscs of Germany

== Recommended literature ==
- (Dutch) Bruyne, R.H. de, 1991. Schelpen van de Nederlandse kust. Jeugdbondsuitgeverij Stichting Uitgevrij KNNV, 165 pag.
- (Dutch) Bruyne, R.H. de, 2004. Veldgids Schelpen. KNNV Uitgeverij, ISBN 90-5011-140-8, 234 pag.
- (Dutch) De Bruyne, R.H., Wallbrink, H. & Gmelig Meyling, A. 2003. Bedreigde en verdwenen land- en zoetwaterweekdieren in Nederland (Mollusca). Basisrapport met voorstel voor de Rode Lijst. European Invertebrate Survey-Nederland, Leiden & Stichting Anemoon, Heemstede. (Red list of Dutch molluscs.)
- (Dutch) Bruyne, R.H. de, Bank, R.A., Adema, J.P.H.M. & Perk, F.A., 1994. Nederlandse naamlijst van de weekdieren (Mollusca) van Nederland en België. Feestuitgave ter gelegenheid van het zestigjarig jubileum van de Nederlandse Malacologische Vereniging. Backhuys, Leiden. 149 pp. ISBN 90-73348-33-1
- (Dutch) Gittenberger, E., Backhys, W., Ripken, Th.E.J., 1984. De landslakken van Nederland. KNNV, Hoogwoud, 184 pp. [2e druk]
- (Dutch) Gittenberger, E., Janssen, A.W., Kuijper, W.J., Kuiper, J.G.J., Meijer, T., Velde, G. van der & Vries, J.N. de, 1998. De Nederlandse zoetwatermollusken. Recente en fossiele weekdieren uit zoet en brak water. Nederlandse Fauna 2. Nationaal Natuurhistorisch Museum Naturalis, KNNV Uitgeverij & EIS-Nederland, Leiden, 288 pp. ISBN 90-5011-201-3
- (German) Kerney, M.P., Cameron, R.A.D. & Jungbluth, J.H., 1983. Die Landschnecken Nord- und Mitteleuropas. Hamburg/Berlin, 384 pp.
