= List of non-marine molluscs of Ireland =

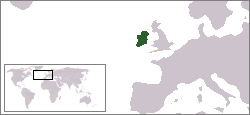
Location of the island of Ireland, marked in green

This list of the non-marine molluscs of Ireland comprises 169 species of non-marine molluscs that have been recorded as part of the fauna of Ireland. Ireland is an island in the northeastern Atlantic. It consists of the Republic of Ireland, also known simply as Ireland (or in the Irish language Éire), and Northern Ireland, which is part of the United Kingdom.

Included in the list are terrestrial gastropods (land snails and slugs) and freshwater and brackish water gastropods and bivalves (mussels and clams). Molluscs that are fully adapted to live in the sea are not included here, except for one marine pulmonate snail that breathes air. Some species of gastropods listed (e.g. Peringia ulvae) live in habitats that are intermediate between freshwater and saltwater. Others live in habitats that are intermediate between land and saltwater. Both of these kinds of species are often also included in marine faunal lists. In addition to the species that live naturally outdoors in Ireland, there are at least 2 aquatic gastropod species which live only in artificially-heated indoor environments such as aquaria in greenhouses. These are known as "hothouse aliens", and in this list they are not counted as part of the total fauna.

The mollusc fauna of the island of Ireland has not been as thoroughly researched as that of the island of Great Britain, and therefore it is possible that some uncommon and local species (whether native or introduced) may, as yet, have been overlooked. Even so, it seems that the non-marine molluscan fauna of Ireland is a smaller fauna than that of Great Britain.

The following table shows a summary of species numbers. It is not always easy to define which species are aquatic and which are terrestrial, as some species such as Galba truncatula are virtually amphibious. It also can be difficult to determine which species are introduced, as some introductions are quite ancient, for example from the Paleolithic. Those species that do not have a shell usually do not leave an archaeological or fossil record, and therefore it is especially difficult to determine whether they are native or introduced.

Non-marine molluscs of Ireland	
Land gastropods	105
Aquatic gastropods	42
Gastropod total:	147
Freshwater bivalves	22
Mollusc total:	169
Introduced non-marine gastropods in natural habitats:	c. 32
Introduced bivalves in natural habitats:	3
Total introduced molluscs in natural habitats:	c. 35
Gastropods living as "hothouse aliens"	2
Bivalves living as "hothouse aliens"	0

== Conservation ==
Species protected by EU Habitats Directive include: Geomalacus maculosus (annex II and IV), Vertigo angustior, Vertigo geyeri, Vertigo moulinsiana (annex II) and Margaritifera margaritifera (annex II and V).

Two species have been protected by the Wildlife Act of 1976 since 1990: Geomalacus maculosus and Margaritifera margaritifera. They were added by regulation SI 112/1990.

A recent regional red list has been published of the non-marine molluscs of Ireland by Byrne et al. (2009). In this publication, the threat status of 150 native species was evaluated using IUCN regional guidelines. Of these species, two are considered to be regionally extinct, five critically endangered, fourteen endangered, twenty-six vulnerable, six near threatened, and the rest of least concern, or data deficient. This publication has sparked some media discussion about molluscan conservation in Ireland, including articles written in the Irish Times.

=== Regional Red List of Irish non-marine molluscs ===
The following species have been assigned threat categories or were considered regionally extinct on the island of Ireland in 2009:

Regionally extinct (RE) Helicigona lapicida (Linnaeus, 1758); Omphiscola glabra (O.F. Müller, 1774) – listed as extinct in the red list, but rediscovered in 2009.

Critically Endangered (CR) Pisidium conventus Clessin, 1877 Pomatias elegans (O.F. Müller, 1774) Margaritifera margaritifera (Linnaeus, 1758) Truncatella subcylindrica (Linnaeus, 1767) Margaritifera durrovensis Philips, 1928

Endangered (EN) Gyraulus laevis (Alder, 1838) Pisidium pulchellum Jenyns, 1832 Hydrobia acuta neglecta (Muus, 1963) Pupilla muscorum (Linnaeus, 1758) Mercuria cf. similis (Draparnaud, 1805) Quickella arenaria (Potiez & Michaud, 1835) Merdigera obscura (O.F. Müller, 1774) Spermodea lamellata (Jeffreys, 1830) Myxas glutinosa (O.F. Müller, 1774) Succinella oblonga Draparnaud, 1801 Pisidium moitessierianum Paladilhe, 1866 Vertigo moulinsiana (Dupuy, 1849) Pisidium pseudosphaerium Schlesch, 1947 Vertigo pusilla O.F. Müller, 1774

Vulnerable (VU) Acicula fusca (Montagu, 1803) Pisidium lilljeborgii Clessin, 1866 Anisus vortex (Linnaeus, 1758) Radix auricularia (Linnaeus, 1758) Anodonta anatina (Linnaeus, 1758) Sphaerium nucleus (Studer, 1820) Anodonta cygnea (Linnaeus, 1758) Tandonia rustica (Millet, 1843) Aplexa hypnorum (Linnaeus, 1758) Testacella haliotidea Draparnaud, 1801 Arianta arbustorum (Linnaeus, 1758) Vallonia pulchella (O.F. Müller, 1774) Balea perversa (Linnaeus, 1758) Ventrosia ventrosa (Montagu, 1803) Cecilioides acicula (O.F. Müller, 1774) Vertigo angustior Jeffreys, 1830 Cochlodina laminata (Montagu, 1803) Vertigo antivertigo (Draparnaud, 1801) Helicella itala (Linnaeus, 1758) Vertigo geyeri Lindholm, 1925 Leiostyla anglica (A. Férussac, 1821) Vertigo lilljeborgi (Westerlund, 1871) Limax cinereoniger Wolf, 1803 Zenobiella subrufescens (J.S. Miller, 1822) Musculium lacustre (O.F. Müller, 1774) Zonitoides excavatus (Alder, 1830)

== Systematic list ==
The list is arranged by biological affinity, rather than being alphabetical by family.

A number of species are listed with subspecies, in cases where there are well-recognized subspecies in different parts of Europe. For some species a synonym is given, where the species may perhaps be better known under another name.

An attempt has been made to label the families as aquatic, terrestrial or intermediate, and an indication is given where it is thought that the species is introduced. Species are considered to be native, unless otherwise indicated; that information is mostly taken from Kerney, and Rowson et al. The status and taxonomy of freshwater gastropods has been updated according to Rowson et al. (2021).

=== Gastropoda ===
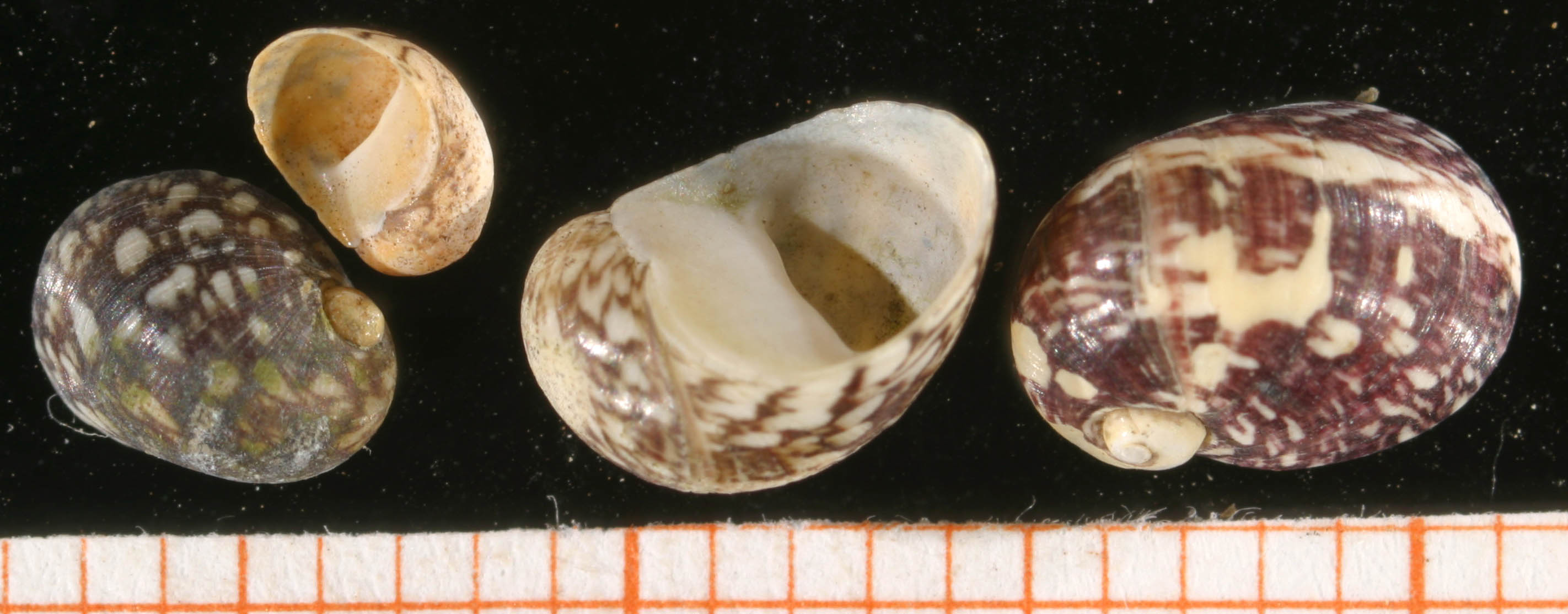
Shells of Theodoxus fluviatilis

Neritidae – aquatic (also tolerates brackish water)

- Theodoxus fluviatilis fluviatilis (Linnaeus, 1758)

Aciculidae – terrestrial

- Acicula fusca (Montagu, 1803)

Viviparidae (river snails) – aquatic

- Viviparus viviparus (Linnaeus, 1758)

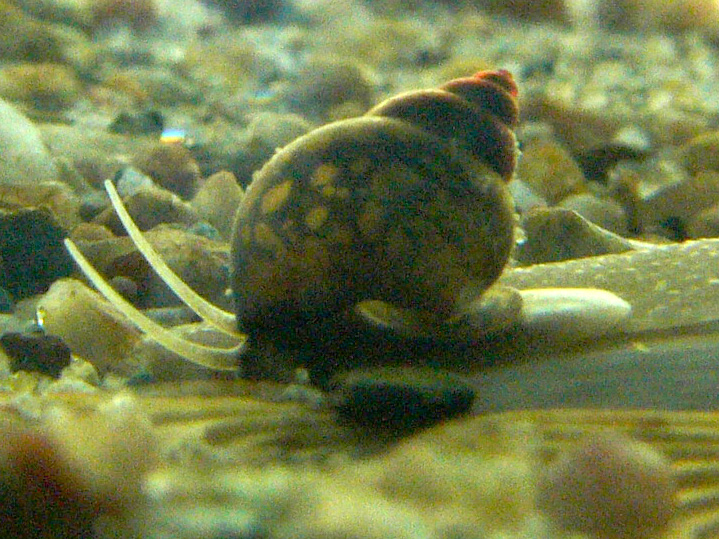
Bithynia tentaculata

Assimineidae – terrestrial (intermediate marine)

- Assiminea grayana Fleming, 1828 – introduced

Truncatellidae – terrestrial (intermediate marine)

- Truncatella subcylindrica (Linnaeus, 1758)

Bithyniidae – aquatic

- Bithynia leachii (Sheppard, 1823)
- Bithynia tentaculata (Linnaeus, 1758)

Potamopyrgidae – aquatic

- Potamopyrgus antipodarum (Gray, 1843) – introduced

Hydrobiidae – aquatic (some are arguably marine)

- Hydrobia acuta (Draparnaud, 1805) – subspecies: Hydrobia acuta neglecta Muus, 1963
- Ecrobia ventrosa (Montagu, 1803) – synonym: Ventrosia ventrosa
- Peringia ulvae (Pennant, 1777)
- Mercuria anatina (Poiret, 1801) – synonyms: M. confusa auct. non Frauenfeld, 1863, M. similis auct. non (Draparnaud, 1805)

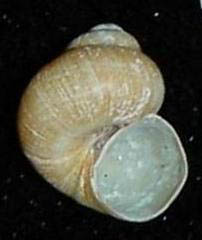
Shell of Valvata piscinalis

Valvatidae (valve snails) – aquatic

- Valvata cristata O.F. Müller, 1774
- Valvata piscinalis (O.F. Müller, 1774)

Pomatiidae (land winkles) – terrestrial

- Pomatias elegans (O.F. Müller, 1774)

The following gastropods are pulmonates:

Ellobiidae (hollow-shelled snails) – terrestrial or semi-marine

- Carychium minimum O.F. Müller, 1774
- Carychium tridentatum (Risso, 1826)
- Leucophytia bidentata (Montagu, 1808)
- Myosotella denticulata (Montagu, 1803)
- Myosotella myosotis (Draparnaud, 1801)

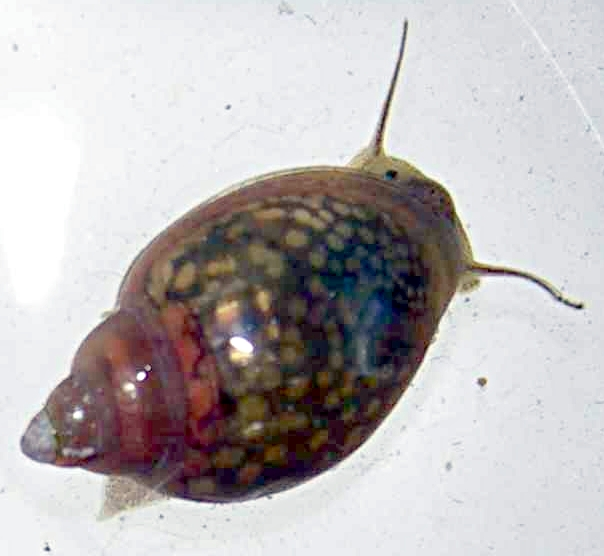
Physella acuta

Otinidae – aquatic (almost fully marine, but a pulmonate)

- Otina ovata (Brown, 1827)

Lymnaeidae – aquatic

- Ampullaceana balthica (Linnaeus, 1758) – synonyms: Radix balthica, Radix peregra auct. non (O.F. Müller, 1774)
- Galba truncatula (O.F. Müller, 1774)
- Lymnaea stagnalis (Linnaeus, 1758)
- Myxas glutinosa (O.F. Müller, 1774) E
- Omphiscola glabra (O.F. Müller, 1774) – found in 2009 at one site in the SE of Ireland, but listed as extinct on a local red list (2009).
- Radix auricularia (Linnaeus, 1758)
- Stagnicola fuscus (C. Pfeiffer, 1821) – synonym: Lymnaea fusca

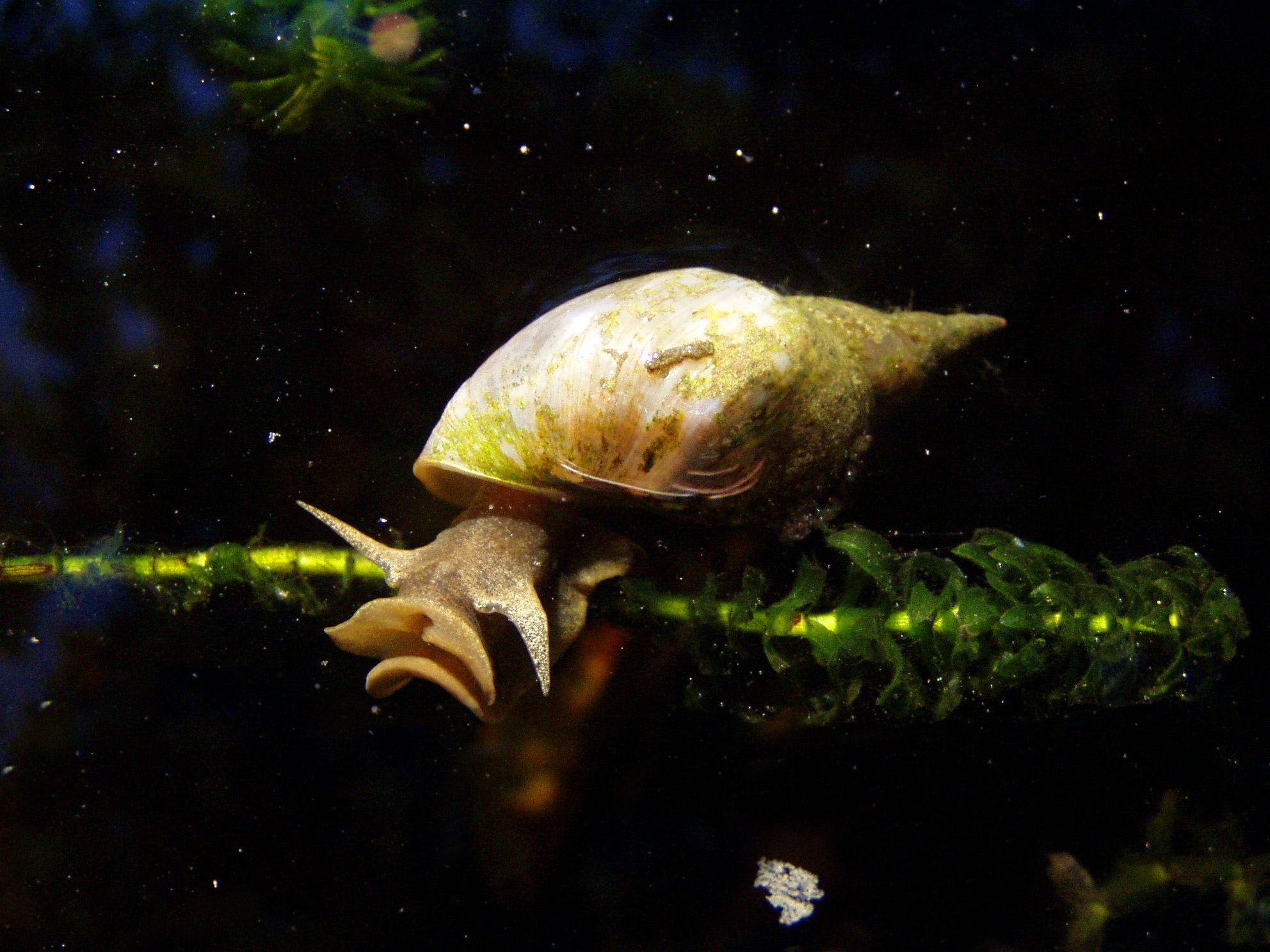
Lymnaea stagnalis

Physidae (bladder snails) – aquatic

- Aplexa hypnorum (Linnaeus, 1758)
- Physa fontinalis (Linnaeus, 1758)
- Physella acuta (Draparnaud, 1805) = Physella heterostropha (Say, 1817) – introduced
- Physella gyrina (Say, 1821) – introduced

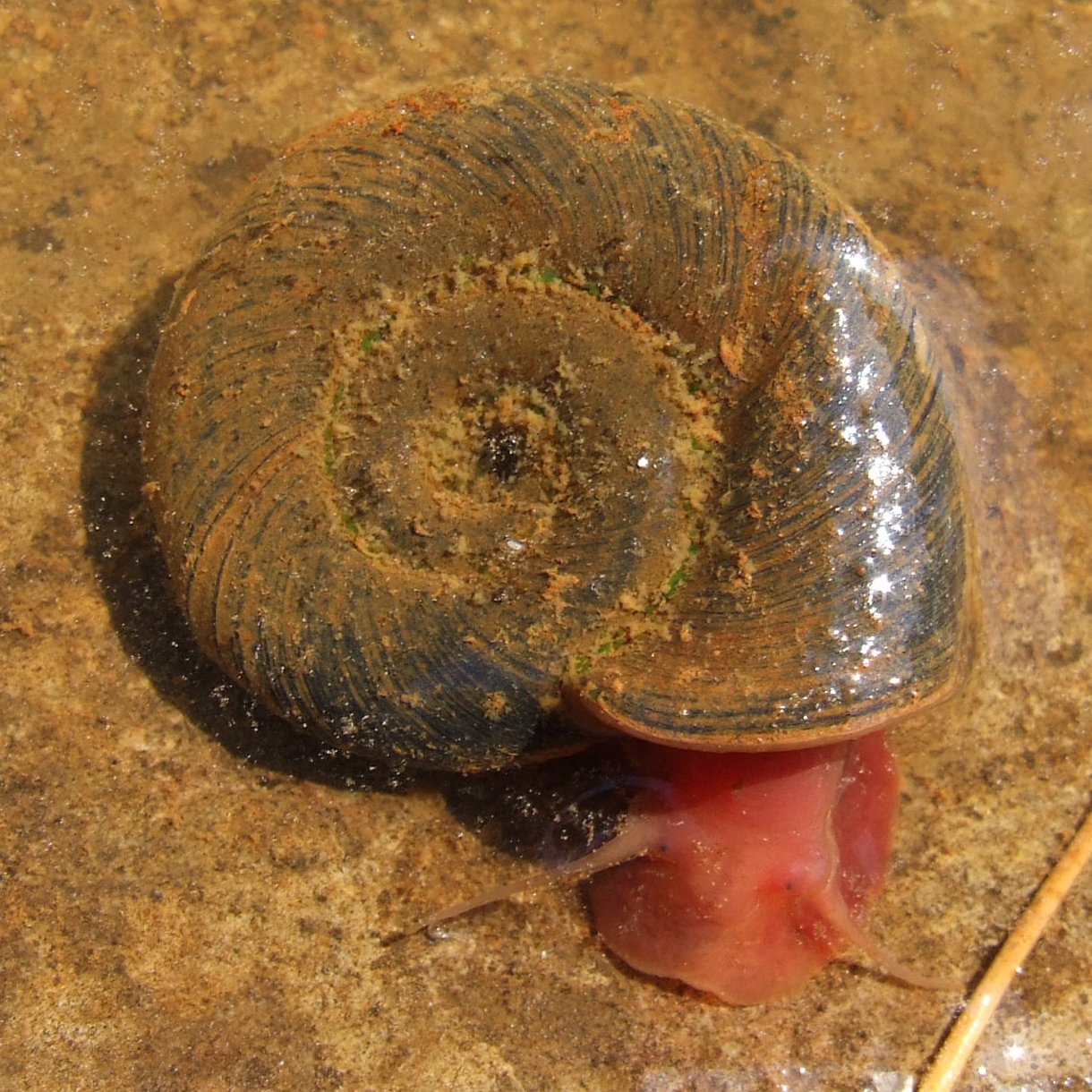
Planorbarius corneus

Planorbidae (ramshorn snails) – aquatic

- Ancylus fluviatilis (O.F. Müller, 1774)
- Anisus leucostoma (Millet, 1813)
- Anisus vortex (Linnaeus, 1758)
- Anisus vorticulus (Troschel, 1834)
- Anisus spirorbis (Linnaeus, 1758)
- Bathyomphalus contortus (Linnaeus, 1758)
- Gyraulus albus (O.F. Müller, 1774)
- Gyraulus crista (Linnaeus, 1758)
- Gyraulus laevis (Alder, 1838)
- Hippeutis complanatus (Linnaeus, 1758)
- Planorbarius corneus corneus (Linnaeus, 1758)
- Planorbis carinatus O.F. Müller, 1774
- Planorbis planorbis (Linnaeus, 1758)

Acroloxidae (river limpets) – aquatic

- Acroloxus lacustris (Linnaeus, 1758)

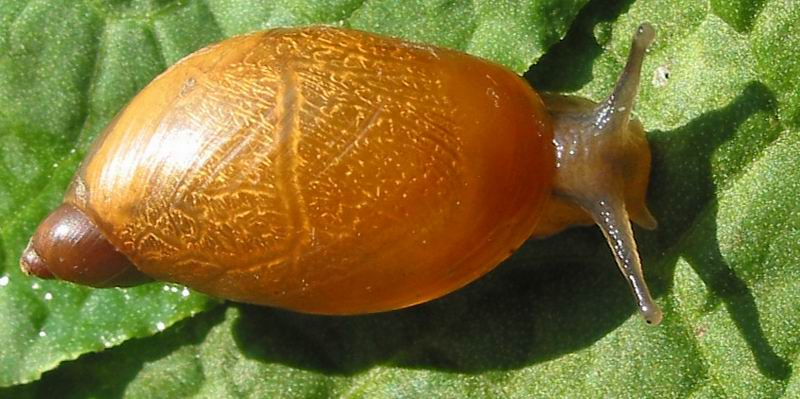
Succinea putris

Succineidae (amber snails) – terrestrial (some almost amphibious)

- Quickella arenaria (Potiez & Michaud, 1838) = Catinella arenaria
- Succinella oblonga Draparnaud, 1801
- Succinea putris Linnaeus, 1758
- Oxyloma elegans elegans (Risso, 1826) = Oxyloma pfeifferi (Rossmässler, 1835)
- Oxyloma sarsii (Esmark, 1886)

Cochlicopidae – terrestrial

- Cochlicopa c.f. lubrica = Cochlicopa lubrica (O.F. Müller, 1774)
- Cochlicopa c.f. lubricella = Cochlicopa lubricella (Rossmässler, 1835)

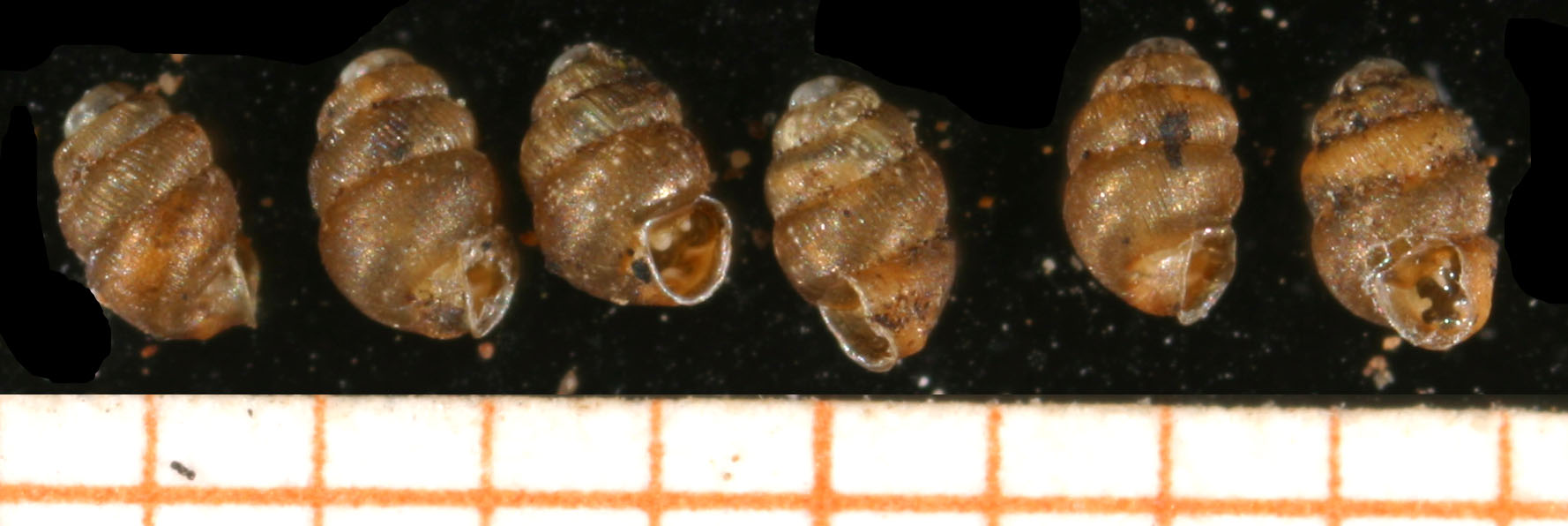
Vertigo substriata

Pyramidulidae – terrestrial

- Pyramidula pusilla (Vallot, 1801)

Vertiginidae (whorl snails) – terrestrial

- Columella edentula Draparnaud, 1805)
- Columella aspera Walden, 1966

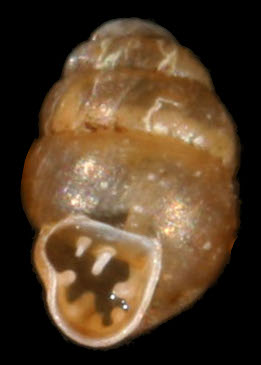
Vertigo pusilla

- Vertigo antivertigo (Draparnaud, 1801)
- Vertigo geyeri Lindholm, 1925
- Vertigo lilljeborgi (Westerlund, 1871)
- Vertigo moulinsiana (Dupuy, 1849)
- Vertigo pusilla O.F. Müller, 1774
- Vertigo pygmaea (Draparnaud, 1801)
- Vertigo substriata (Jeffreys, 1833)
- Vertigo angustior Jeffreys, 1830

Pupillidae – terrestrial

- Pupilla muscorum (Linnaeus, 1758)
- Pupilla alpicola (Charpentier, 1837)

Lauriidae – terrestrial

- Leiostyla anglica (Wood, 1828)
- Lauria cylindracea (da Costa, 1778)

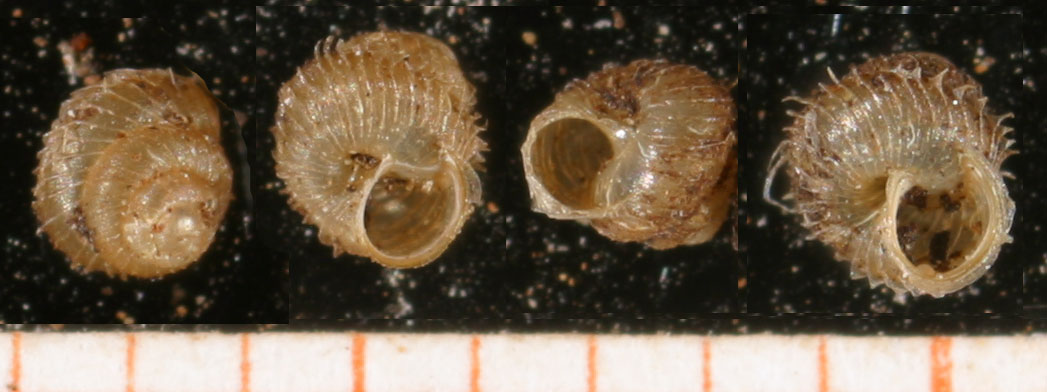
Shells of Acanthinula aculeata

Valloniidae – terrestrial

- Vallonia costata (O.F. Müller, 1774)
- Vallonia pulchella (O.F. Müller, 1774)
- Vallonia c.f. excentrica = Vallonia excentrica Sterke, 1892
- Acanthinula aculeata (O.F. Müller, 1774)
- Spermodea lamellata (Jeffreys, 1830)

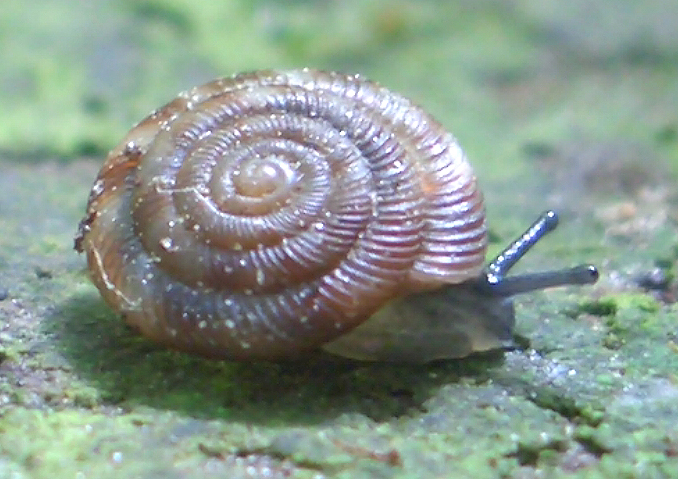
Discus rotundatus

Enidae – terrestrial

- Merdigera obscura = Ena obscura (O.F. Müller, 1774)

Punctidae (dot snails) – terrestrial

- Punctum pygmaeum (Draparnaud, 1801)

Discidae – terrestrial

- Discus rotundatus rotundatus (O.F. Müller, 1774)

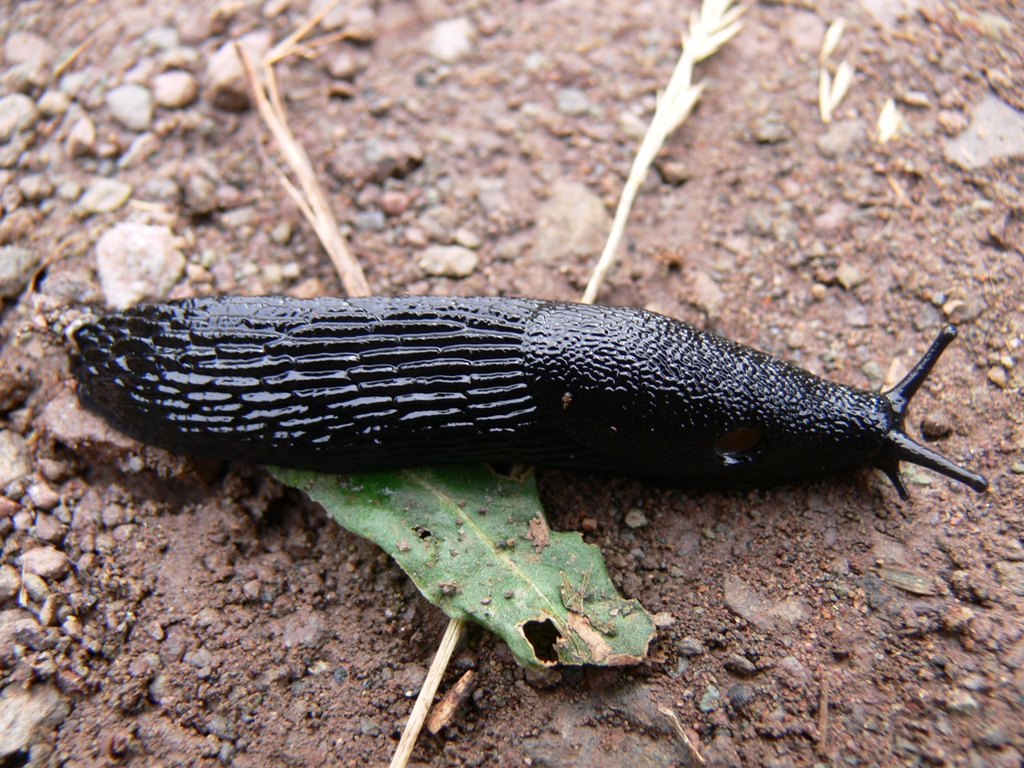
Arion ater

Arionidae (roundback slugs) – terrestrial

- Arion ater (Linnaeus, 1758)
- Arion flagellus Collinge, 1893 – probably introduced
- Arion vulgaris Moquin-Tandon, 1855 = (misapplied) Arion lusitanicus Mabille, 1868 – introduced
- Arion subfuscus Draparnaud, 1805
- Arion fuscus (O.F. Müller, 1774) – possibly introduced
- Arion circumscriptus Johnston, 1828
- Arion rufus (Linnaeus, 1758)
- (Arion silvaticus Lohmander, 1937, currently considered a variety of A. circumscriptus)

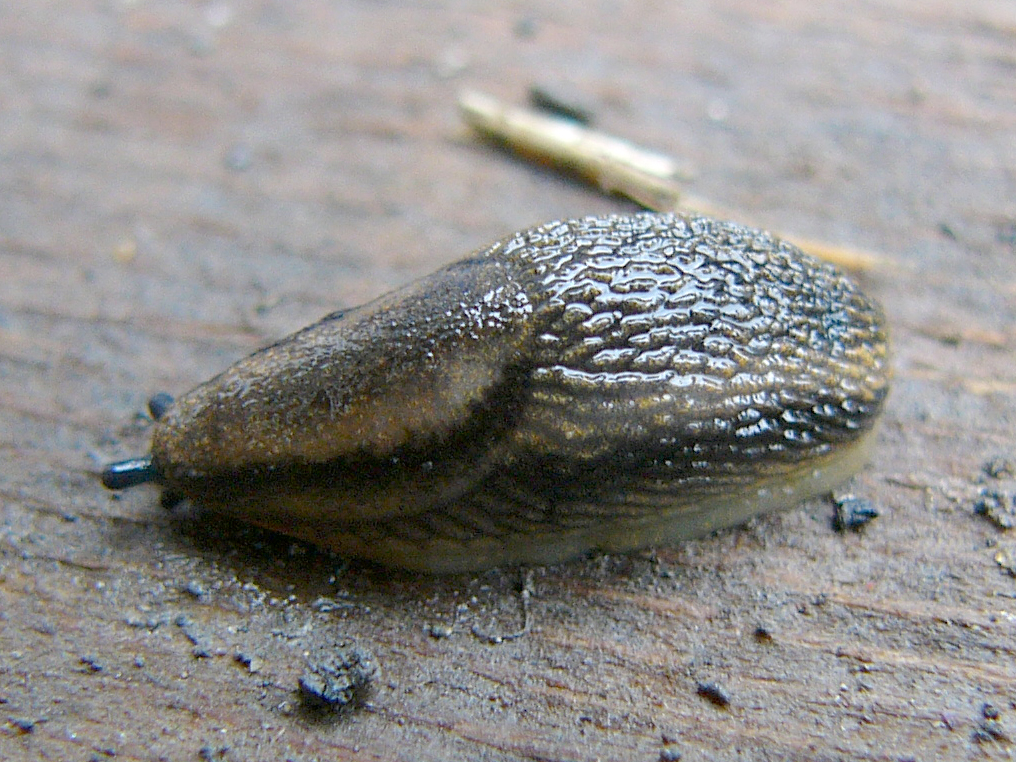
Arion distinctus

- Arion fasciatus (Nilsson, 1823) – probably introduced
- Arion hortensis A. Férussac, 1819
- Arion distinctus J. Mabille, 1868
- Arion owenii Davies, 1979
- Arion intermedius (Normand, 1852)
- Arion occultus Anderson, 2004 – introduced
- Geomalacus maculosus Allman, 1843 – introduced

Pristilomatidae – terrestrial

- Vitrea contracta (Westerlund, 1871)
- Vitrea crystallina (O.F. Müller, 1774)

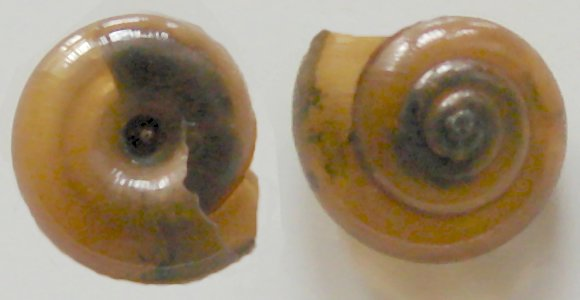
Shells of Zonitoides nitidus

Euconulidae – terrestrial

- Euconulus fulvus (O.F. Müller, 1774)
- Euconulus alderi (J.E. Gray, 1840)

Gastrodontidae – terrestrial

- Zonitoides nitidus (O.F. Müller, 1774)
- Zonitoides excavatus (Alder, 1830)

Oxychilidae – terrestrial

- Oxychilus alliarius (Miller, 1822)
- Oxychilus cellarius (O.F. Müller, 1774)
- Oxychilus draparnaudi draparnaudi (Beck, 1837) – introduced
- Oxychilus navarricus helveticus (Blum, 1881) – introduced
- Aegopinella nitidula (Draparnaud, 1805)
- Aegopinella pura (Alder, 1830)
- Nesovitrea hammonis (Ström, 1765) =Perpolita hammonis

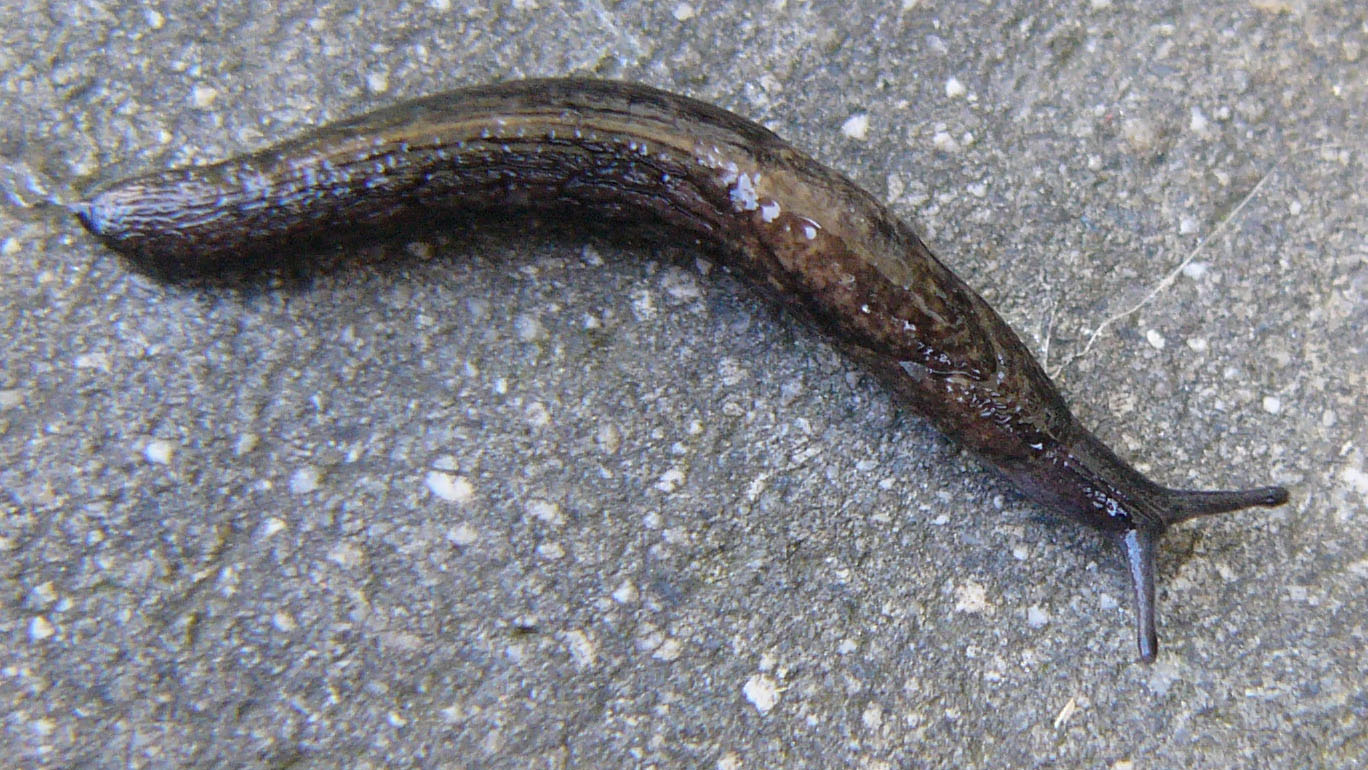
Tandonia budapestensis

Milacidae – terrestrial

- Milax gagates (Draparnaud, 1801)
- Tandonia rustica (Millet, 1843)
- Tandonia budapestensis (Hazay, 1881) – introduced
- Tandonia sowerbyi (A. Férussac, 1823)
- Tandonia cf. cristata (Kaleniczenko, 1851) – introduced

Vitrinidae – terrestrial

- Vitrina pellucida (O.F. Müller, 1774)
- Semilimax pyrenaicus (A. Férussac, 1821) – introduced?

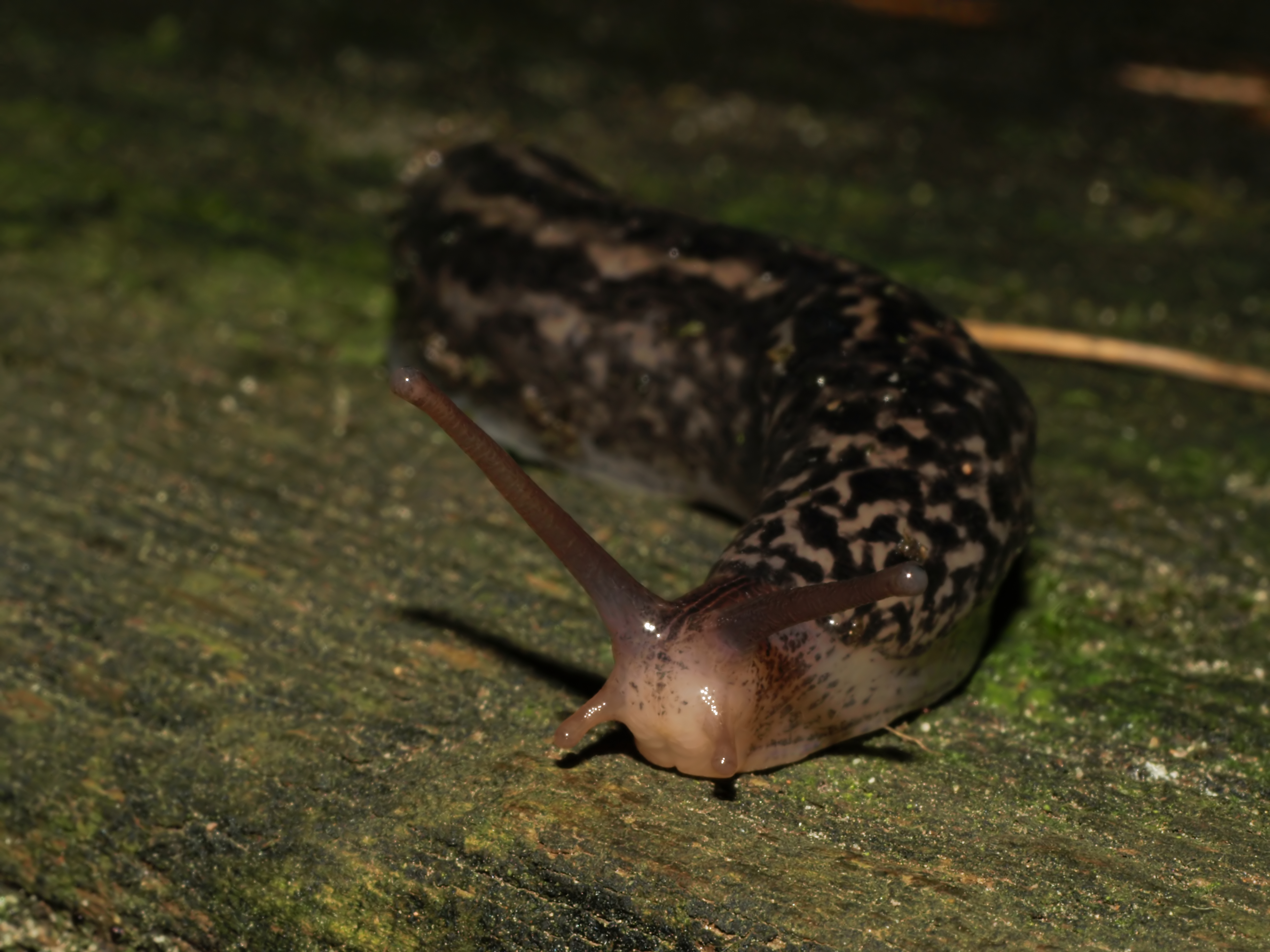
Limax maximus

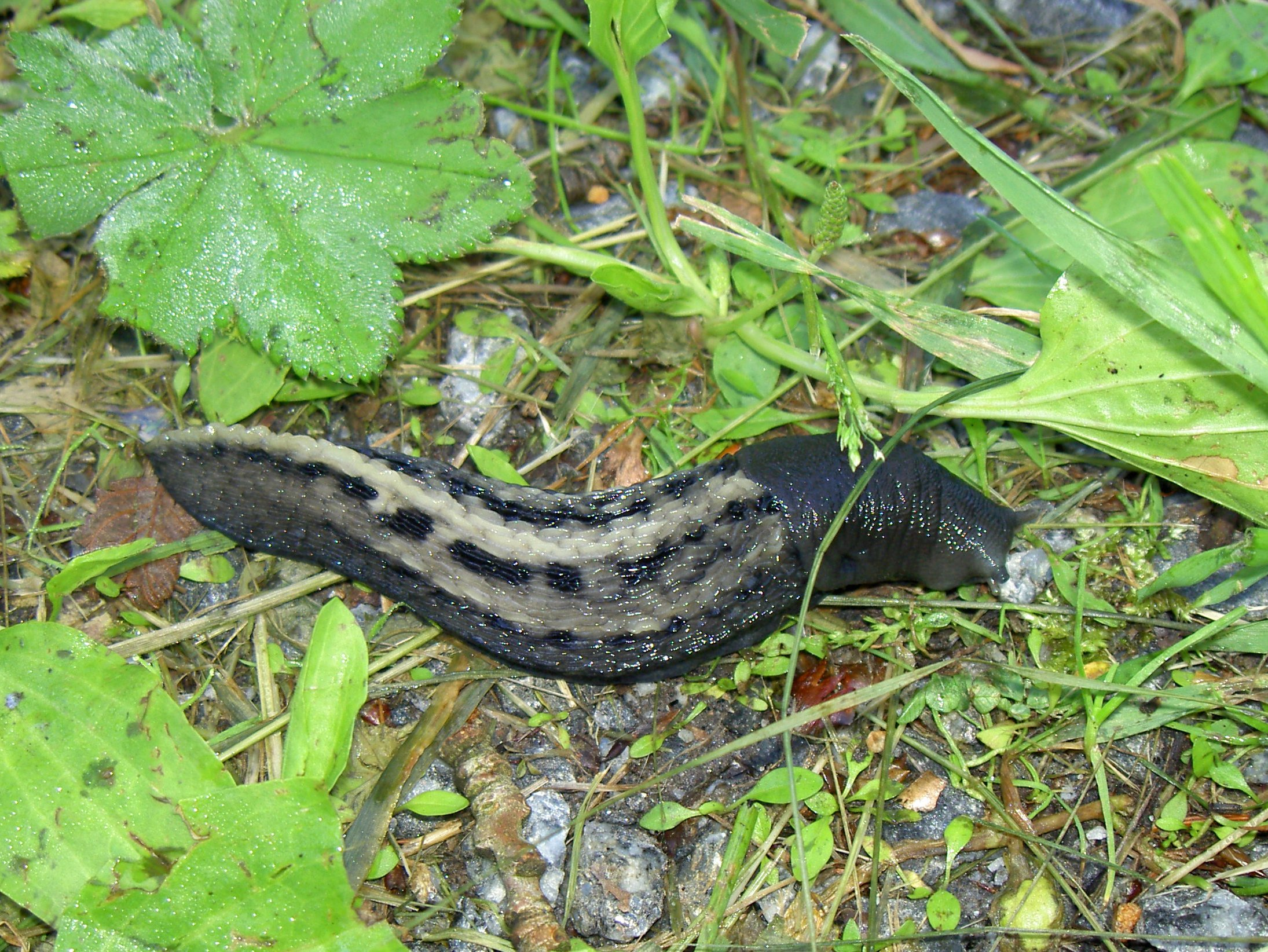
Limax cinereoniger

Boettgerillidae – terrestrial

- Boettgerilla pallens Simroth, 1912 – introduced

Limacidae (keelback slugs) – terrestrial

- Limax maximus Linnaeus, 1758
- Limax cinereoniger Wolf, 1803
- Limacus flavus (Linnaeus, 1758) – introduced
- Limax maculatus (Kaleniczenko, 1851) – introduced
- Lehmannia marginata (O.F. Müller, 1774)
- Ambigolimax valentianus (A. Férussac, 1822) – introduced
- Ambigolimax parvipenis Hutchinson, Reise & Schlitt, 2022 – introduced

Agriolimacidae – terrestrial

- Deroceras laeve (O.F. Müller, 1774)
- Deroceras reticulatum (O.F. Müller, 1774)
- Deroceras invadens Reise, Hutchinson, Schunack & Schlitt, 2011 – introduced
- Deroceras panormitanum (Lessona & Pollonera, 1882) – introduced

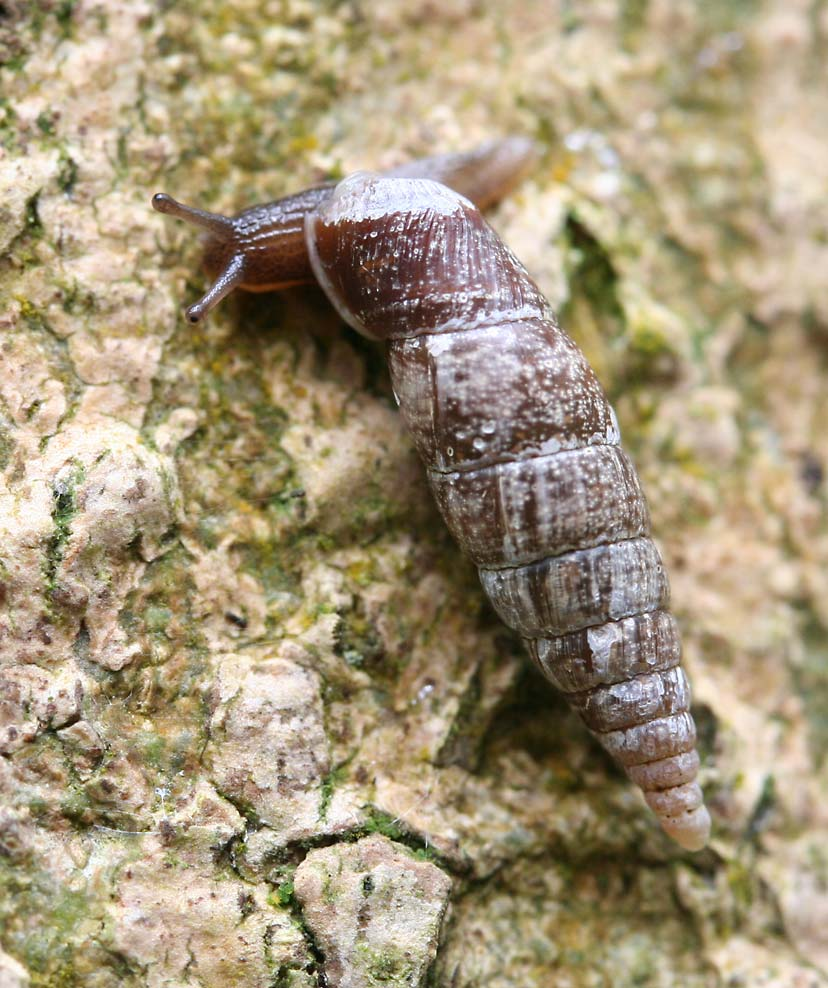
Cochlodina laminata

Ferussaciidae – terrestrial

- Cecilioides acicula (O.F. Müller, 1774) – probably introduced

Clausiliidae (door snails) – terrestrial

- Cochlodina laminata (Montagu, 1803)
- Clausilia bidentata bidentata (Ström, 1765)
- Balea perversa (Linnaeus, 1758)
- Balea sarsii Pfeiffer, 1847

Testacellidae (shelled slugs) – terrestrial

- Testacella maugei A. Férussac, 1822 – probably introduced
- Testacella haliotidea Draparnaud, 1801 – probably introduced
- Testacella scutulum Sowerby, 1821 – probably introduced
- Testacella sp. "tenuipenis" – probably introduced

Cochlicellidae – terrestrial

- Cochlicella acuta (O.F. Müller, 1774) – introduced

Hygromiidae – terrestrial

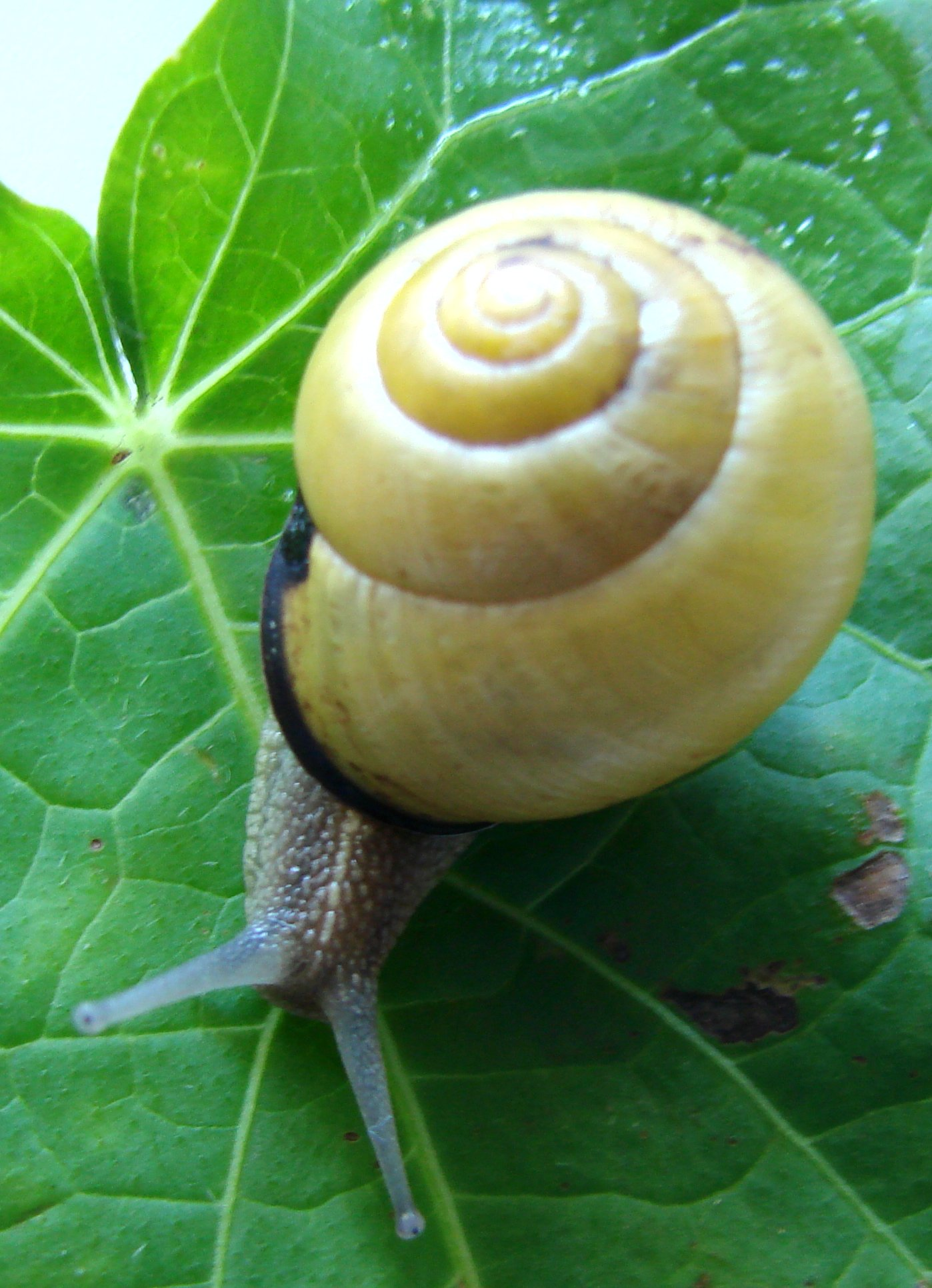
Cepaea nemoralis

- Ashfordia granulata (Alder, 1830)
- Candidula gigaxii (L. Pfeiffer, 1850) – introduced
- Candidula intersecta (Poiret, 1801) – introduced
- Cernuella virgata (Da Costa, 1778) – probably introduced
- Helicella itala itala (Linnaeus, 1758)
- Hygromia cinctella (Draparnaud, 1801) – introduced
- Trochulus hispidus (Linnaeus, 1758)
- Trochulus striolatus (Pfeiffer, 1828)
- Zenobiella subrufescens (Miller, 1822)

Helicidae – terrestrial

- Arianta arbustorum arbustorum (Linnaeus, 1758)
- Helicigona lapicida lapicida (Linnaeus, 1758)
- Theba pisana pisana (O.F. Müller, 1774) – introduced
- Cepaea nemoralis nemoralis (Linnaeus, 1758)
- Cepaea hortensis (O.F. Müller, 1774)
- Cornu aspersum aspersum = Helix aspersa (O.F. Müller, 1774) – introduced

=== Bivalvia ===
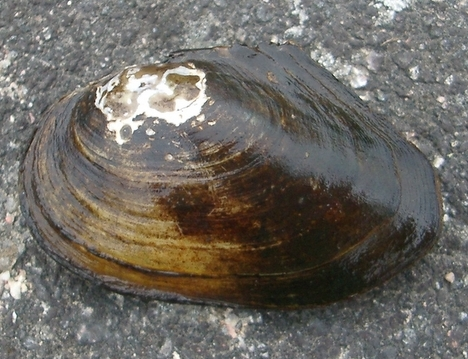
Anodonta anatina

Margaritiferidae – aquatic

- Margaritifera margaritifera (Linnaeus, 1758)

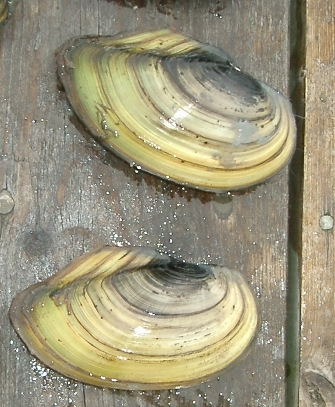
Anodonta cygnea

Unionidae (river mussels) – aquatic

- Anodonta anatina (Linnaeus, 1758)
- Anodonta cygnea (Linnaeus, 1758)

Sphaeriidae (pea clams, fingernail clams) – aquatic

- Sphaerium corneum (Linnaeus, 1758)
- Sphaerium nucleus (Studer, 1820)
- Musculium lacustre (O.F. Müller, 1774)
- Pisidium amnicum (O.F. Müller, 1774)
- Pisidium casertanum (Poli, 1791)
- Pisidium conventus (Clessin, 1877)
- Pisidium henslowanum (Sheppard, 1823)
- Pisidium hibernicum Westerlund, 1894
- Pisidium lilljeborgii (Clessin, 1886)
- Pisidium milium Held, 1836

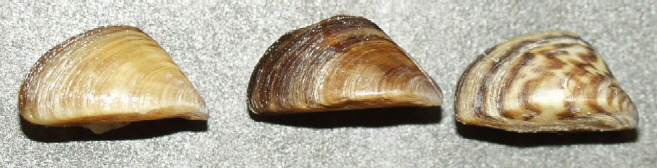
Dreissena polymorpha

- Pisidium moitessierianum Paladilhe, 1866
- Pisidium nitidum Jenyns, 1832
- Pisidium obtusale (Lamarck, 1818)
- Pisidium personatum Malm, 1855
- Pisidium pulchellum (Jenyns, 1832)
- Pisidium pseudosphaerium Favre, 1927
- Pisidium subtruncatum Malm, 1855

Dreissenidae – aquatic

- Dreissena polymorpha (Pallas, 1771) – introduced
- Dreissena bugensis (Andrusov, 1897) – introduced

Corbiculidae (basket clams) – aquatic

- Corbicula fluminea (O.F. Müller, 1774) – introduced

== List of "hothouse alien" species ==
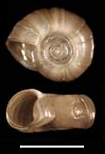
Two views of a shell of Planorbella duryi

These freshwater species are not truly part of the fauna, because they do not live in the wild. They are tropical, and thus are incapable of surviving in the wild in Ireland; instead they have established themselves as uninvited inhabitants of aquaria within greenhouses, and similar artificially-heated aquatic habitats.

Lymnaeidae – aquatic

- Radix rubiginosa (Michelin, 1831), native to Indo-China and Indonesia

Planorbidae – aquatic

- Planorbella duryi (Wetherby, 1879)

== See also ==
- List of marine molluscs of Ireland
- Biota of the Isle of Man#Mollusca (molluscs)
- List of non-marine molluscs of Great Britain
- List of non-marine molluscs of the Netherlands
