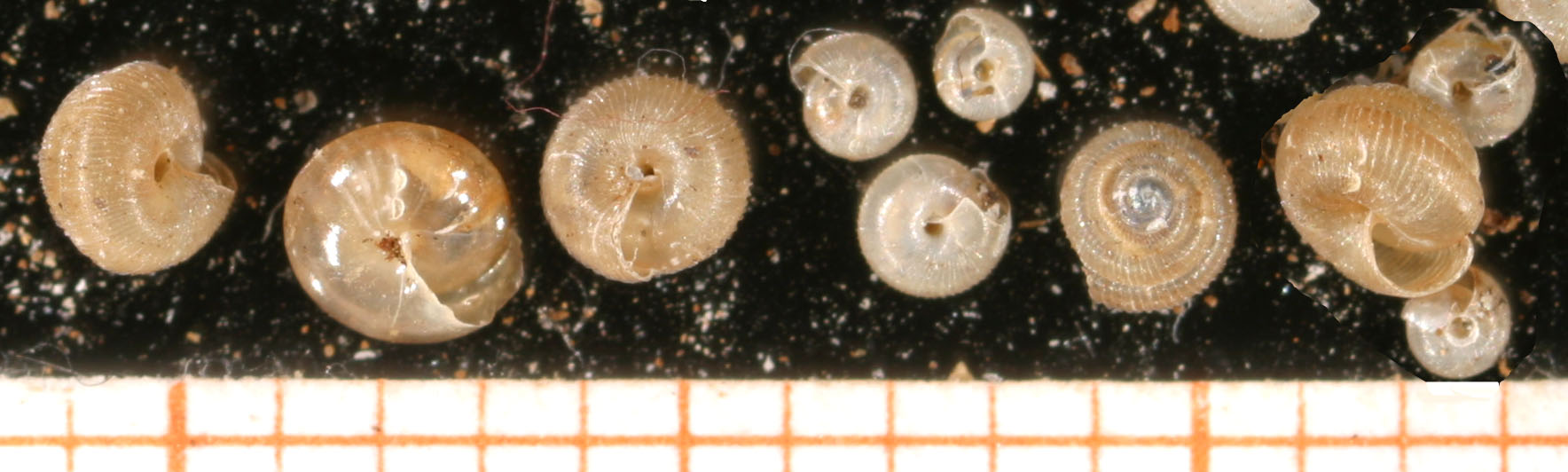
- A group of shells of Spermodea lamellata

Scientific classification
- Kingdom: Animalia
- Phylum: Mollusca
- Class: Gastropoda
- Order: Stylommatophora
- Family: Valloniidae
- Genus: Spermodea
- Species: S. lamellata

Binomial name
- Spermodea lamellata Jeffreys, 1830

Synonyms
- Acanthinula lamellata

= Spermodea lamellata =

Species of gastropod

Spermodea lamellata is a species of small European land snail, a terrestrial gastropod mollusc, or micromollusc, in the family Valloniidae.

== Description ==
For terms see gastropod shell.

The 2-2.2 mm x 2-2.2 mm shell has a characteristic semispherical shape like a bee skep basket. The shell has 6 convex whorls which increase gradually in size. The sutures are deep. The whorls are decorated with very fine, very regular, radial ribs. These ribs function as a diffraction grating, giving the yellow shell a silky appearance. The apertural margin is simple and breaks easily. There are no folds inside the aperture. The umbilicus is narrow. Juveniles are paler with weaker ribs at the lower side, and the umbilicus relatively wider.

== Distribution ==
This species occurs in areas which include:

- Denmark
- Great Britain
- Ireland
- Czech Republic
- Northern Germany
- Netherlands - extinct
- Norway
- Poland - isolated locality
- Portugal - isolated localities in Serra de Bussaco mountains (in Beira Alta), and in Sintra
- Sweden
- Ukraine
- and other areas

== Habitat ==
This minute snail lives in ancient woodland.
