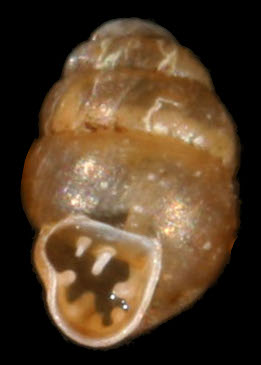
- Apertural view of a shell of Vertigo pusilla

Conservation status
- Least Concern (IUCN 3.1)

Scientific classification
- Kingdom: Animalia
- Phylum: Mollusca
- Class: Gastropoda
- Order: Stylommatophora
- Family: Vertiginidae
- Subfamily: Vertigininae
- Genus: Vertigo
- Species: V. pusilla

Binomial name
- Vertigo pusilla O. F. Müller, 1774

Synonyms
- Helix vertigo Gmelin, 1791 (junior synonym); Pupa clevei Westerlund, 1887 (junior synonym); Pupa collina Westerlund, 1871 (junior synonym); Pupa otostoma Westerlund, 1871 (junior synonym); Vertigo (Vertigo) pusilla O. F. Müller, 1774 alternate representation; Vertigo heterostropha W. Turton, 1831 (junior subjective synonym); Vertigo tumida Westerlund, 1867

= Vertigo pusilla =

Species of gastropod

Vertigo pusilla is a species of small air-breathing land snail, a terrestrial pulmonate gastropod mollusk or micromollusk in the family Vertiginidae, the whorl snails.

Vertigo pusilla is the type species of the genus Vertigo.

Subspecies

- † Vertigo pusilla irenae Schlickum, 1975
- Vertigo pusilla pusilla O. F. Müller, 1774
- † Vertigo pusilla sarmatica Kókay, 2006

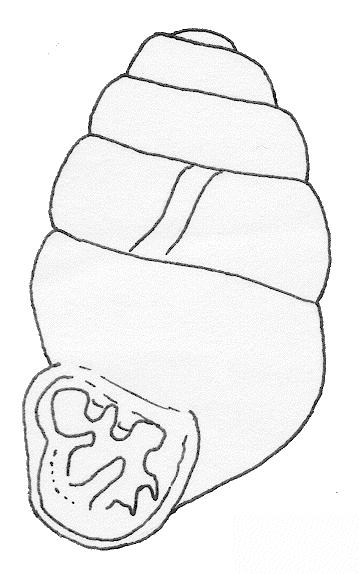
Drawing of a shell

== Shell description ==
1,66 to 2,18 mm high and 1,01 to 1,20 mm wide Shell subfusiform, with, somewhat of a quadrangular outline, thin and semitransparent, very glossy, horn-color, with a faint tinge of yellow, very slightly and remotely striate in the line of growth; periphery rounded, with a tendency to angularity; epidermis thin; whorls 4 ½ or 5, very convex and cylindrical, gradually increasing in size, the penultimate whorl as broad as the last, which occupies about two-fifths of the shell. Spire is shortish, but rather tapering, and blunt at the point. Suture is very deep.

Aperture is semioval, contracted or sinuous in the middle of the outer edge; teeth six or seven, viz. two on the pillar [parietal wall], two on the pillar lip (the inner one of which is always larger, and the outside one tubercular and placed in the angle where the outer lip joins), and two or three within the outer lip (the third, when it is present, placed near the pillar lip and being a mere tubercle:) outer lip rather thick and slightly reflected, strengthened by a strong rib both outside and inside, which is situate near the opening of the mouth and is yellowish-white; outer edge rather abruptly inflected; inner lip slightly thickened in full grown specimens; umbilicus small and narrow, contracted by a rather sharp and gibbous crest or ridge at the base of the shell.

== Distribution ==
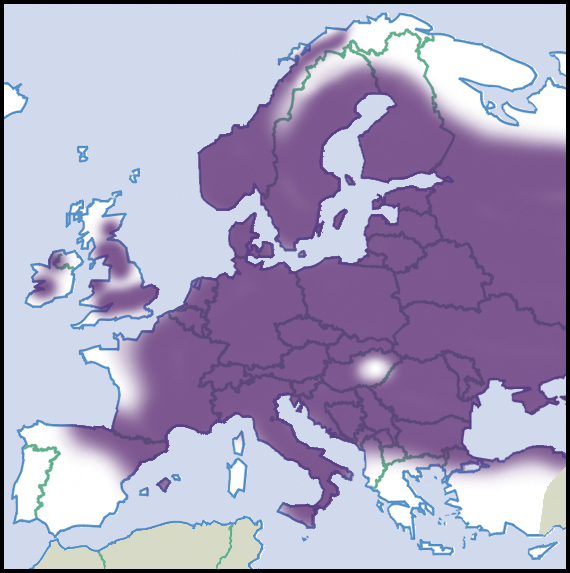
Distribution

This snail occurs in European countries and islands including:

- Czech Republic
- Netherlands
- Poland
- Slovakia
- Ukraine
- Great Britain
- Ireland
