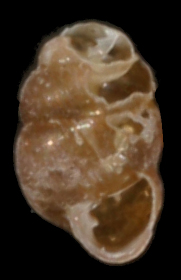
- A damaged shell of Vertigo lilljeborgi

Scientific classification
- Kingdom: Animalia
- Phylum: Mollusca
- Class: Gastropoda
- Order: Stylommatophora
- Family: Vertiginidae
- Subfamily: Vertigininae
- Genus: Vertigo
- Species: V. lilljeborgi

Binomial name
- Vertigo lilljeborgi (Westerlund, 1871)

Synonyms
- Pupa lilljeborgi Westerlund, 1871; Vertigo (Alaea) lilljeborgi (Westerlund, 1871) · alternate representation; Vertigo (Vertigo) lilljeborgi (Westerlund, 1871)

= Vertigo lilljeborgi =

Species of gastropod

Vertigo lilljeborgi is a species of small land snail, a terrestrial pulmonate gastropod mollusk or micromollusk in the family Vertiginidae, the whorl snails.

Subspecies

- Vertigo lilljeborgi lilljeborgi (Westerlund, 1871)
- Vertigo lilljeborgi vinlandica Nekola, Chiba, Coles, Drost, Proschwitz & Horsák, 2018

== Distribution ==
The type locality for this species is on the southern shore of Tresjön Lake, near Ronneby, Blekinge province, in Sweden.

This species is known to occur in a number of countries and islands in Northern Europe including:

- Great Britain, Wales, Scotland
- Ireland
- Denmark
- Germany
- Scandinavia: Sweden, ...
- Latvia
- and other areas

== Shell description ==
The shell is ventricose, ovate, strongly glossy, very finely striate, chestnut horn-color. The shell has 5 whorls, rather rapidly increasing, convex, the last but little higher than the penult, double as high as the next earlier whorl, a little ascending in front. Suture is slightly oblique.

Aperture is quite piriform, or obliquely cordate, with 1 parietal tooth (sometimes with another punctiform one), 2 columellar teeth, the lower very small, often wanting; 2 short, high, equal, immersed teeth in the palate, bounded by a reddish-brown streak in front. Peristome is weak, expanded, the margins delicately united; outer margin not impressed, scarcely produced angularly forward.

The width of the adult shell varies from 1.25 to 1.5 mm, the height from 2-2.25 mm.

Vertigo lilljeborgi, compared with Vertigo moulinsiana, is much smaller, more glossy, its whorls are more tumid, and its thinner lip lacks the broad, almost colorless margin of the latter.
