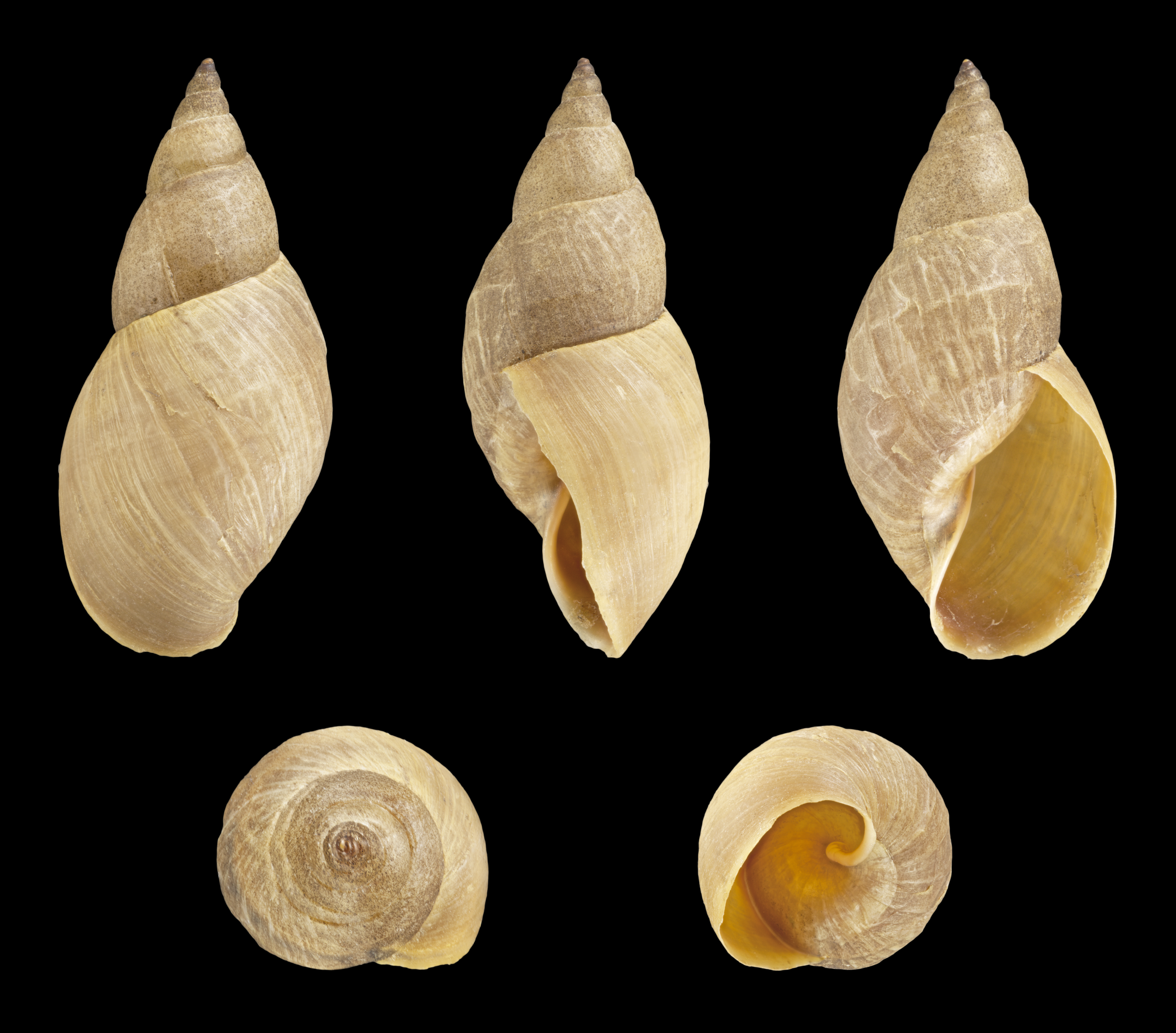
- A shell of Stagnicola corvus

Conservation status
- Least Concern (IUCN 3.1)

Scientific classification
- Kingdom: Animalia
- Phylum: Mollusca
- Class: Gastropoda
- Superorder: Hygrophila
- Family: Lymnaeidae
- Genus: Stagnicola
- Species: S. corvus

Binomial name
- Stagnicola corvus (Gmelin, 1791)

Synonyms
- Lymnaea corvus Gmelin, 1791

= Stagnicola corvus =

Species of gastropod

Stagnicola corvus is a species of air-breathing freshwater snail, an aquatic pulmonate gastropod mollusk in the family Lymnaeidae, the pond snails.

== Distribution ==
This species is found in the Czech Republic, Slovakia, Germany, Poland, Ukraine, the Netherlands and other areas.

== Biotope ==
This species inhabits bodies of freshwater.

== See also ==
- List of non-marine molluscs of Ukraine
- List of non-marine molluscs of Poland
- List of non-marine molluscs of the Czech Republic
- List of non-marine molluscs of Slovakia
- List of non-marine molluscs of Germany
- List of non-marine molluscs of the Netherlands
