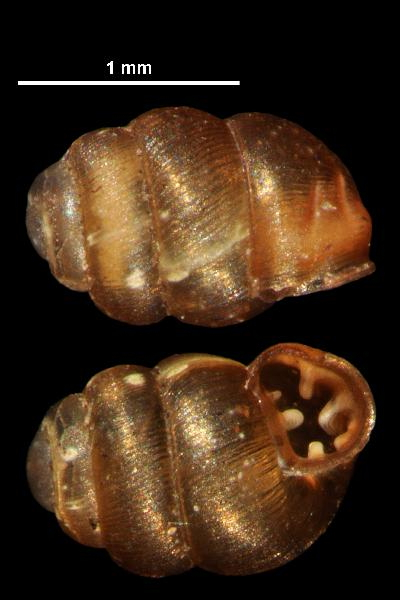
- shell of Vertigo substriata (specimen at MNHN, Paris)

Conservation status
- Least Concern (IUCN 3.1)

Scientific classification
- Kingdom: Animalia
- Phylum: Mollusca
- Class: Gastropoda
- Order: Stylommatophora
- Family: Vertiginidae
- Subfamily: Vertigininae
- Genus: Vertigo
- Species: V. substriata

Binomial name
- Vertigo substriata Jeffreys, 1833

Synonyms
- Alæa substriata Jeffreys, 1833; Alaea substriata f. viridana Lindholm, 1910 (junior synonym); Pupa (Vertigo) substriata (Jeffreys, 1833) superseded combination; Pupa (Vertigo) substriata var. mitis O. Boettger, 1880 junior subjective synonym; Pupa striata (Reeve, 1863) (invalid; preoccupied); Pupa substriata (Jeffreys, 1833); Vertigo (Vertigo) substriata (Jeffreys, 1833)· accepted, alternate representation; Vertigo striata Reeve, 1863

= Vertigo substriata =

Species of mollusc

Vertigo substriata is a species of minute air-breathing land snail, a terrestrial pulmonate gastropod mollusk or micromollusk in the family Vertiginidae, the whorl snails.

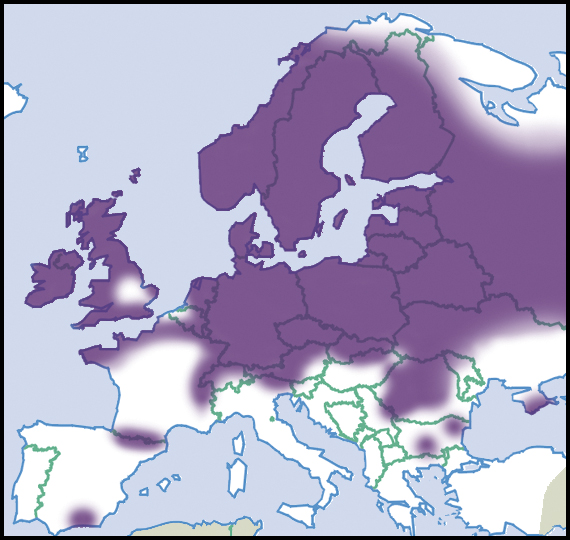
Distribution

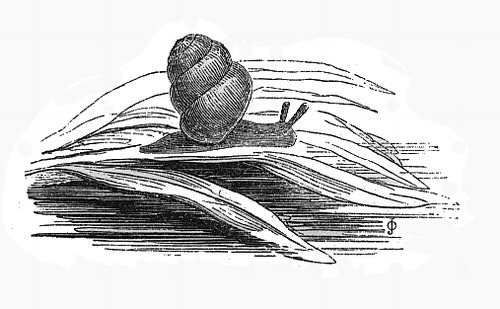
Engraving of Vertigo substriata made by Orlando Jewitt from 1863 book The land and freshwater mollusks indigenous to, or naturalized in, the British Isles by Lovell Augustus Reeve (1814-1865), (with illustrations by George Brettingham Sowerby II and Orlando Jewitt).

== Distribution ==
The type locality is the Barnstaple district, of Devonshire, England. "Under stones, among dead and decaying leaves and at the roots of grass in woods and moist places."

This species occurs in countries and islands including:

- Czech Republic
- Netherlands
- Poland
- Slovakia
- Ukraine
- Great Britain
- Ireland
- Latvia
- and others

== Shell description ==
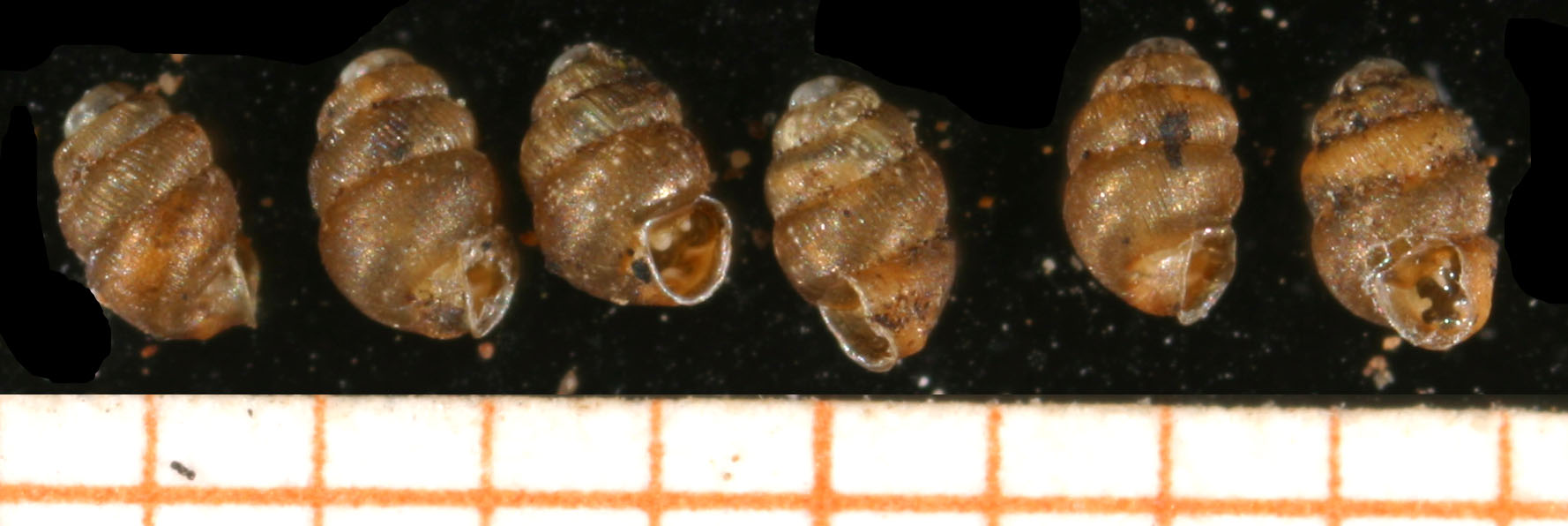
Shells of Vertigo substriata. Scale is in mm.

The shell is oval or subfusiform, rather thin, and semitransparent, glossy, pale yellowish-horn-color, very strongly and obliquely striate and almost ribbed in the line of growth, but less so on the body whorl, which is faintly striate spirally, periphery is rounded. The epidermis is rather thick. The shell has 4 whorls, which are very convex or cylindrical, and suddenly increasing in bulk. The penultimate whorl is slightly exceeding in breadth the last, which occupies about one-half of the shell. Spire is short, very abrupt and bluntly pointed. Suture is remarkably deep.

Aperture is semioval, contracted or sinuous in the middle of the outer edge; teeth from four to six, viz. from one to three (usually two) on the pillar (on parietal wall), one on the pillar lip, and two or three on the inside of the outer lip, the last springing from a white rib; in half grown specimens the pillar lip has a spiral or longitudinal fold. Outer lip thin and slightly reflected, externally strengthened by a strong rib, which is placed very near the opening the mouth; outer edge abruptly inflected, inner lip thickened in the adult. Umbilicus is small and narrow, contracted by a keel or ridge at the base of the shell.

The width of the adult shell is about 0.04 inch, the height is 0.065 inch.
