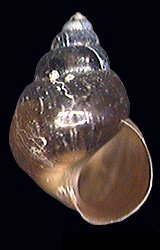

Conservation status
- Least Concern (IUCN 3.1)

Scientific classification
- Kingdom: Animalia
- Phylum: Mollusca
- Class: Gastropoda
- Subclass: Caenogastropoda
- Order: Littorinimorpha
- Family: Assimineidae
- Genus: Assiminea
- Species: A. grayana

Binomial name
- Assiminea grayana Fleming, 1828

Synonyms
- Assemania ostiorum Bavay, 1920; Assiminea (Assiminea) grayana J. Fleming, 1828 alternative representation; Assiminea (Assiminea) ostiorum Bavay, 1920 alternative representation; Assiminea grayi [sic] · misspelling - incorrect subsequent spelling; Assiminea ostiorum Bavay, 1920

= Assiminea grayana =

Species of gastropod

Assiminea grayana, common name the "dun sentinel", is a species of very small (4–6 mm.) salt marsh snail, a terrestrial (or marine gastropod mollusk in the family Assimineidae.

== Habitat ==
This species lives in habitats that are intermediate between land and saltwater: in estuaries and salt marshes, at, or right above, the high tide level.

== Description ==
The 5 mm high x 3 mm. wide shell is semi-transparent and conical, with six or seven flat-sided or slightly swollen whorls and a sharp apex. It bears fine irregular growth lines and faint spiral lines but appears smooth . The oval or ear-shaped aperture is small and has a thickened peristome. The inner lip is reflexed over the base of the last whorl. There is no umbilicus. The colour is horn or tan, often with a broad reddish band on the last whorl.

== Distribution ==
This small snail lives in Western Europe, primarily on the southern part of the North Sea coasts, in countries and islands including:

- Great Britain
- Ireland
- The Netherlands

== Reproduction ==
This species reproduces sexually. The male has a penis in the middle, or at least close to the middle, of his head. The female has a series of translucent glands the lead to a seminal receptacle, where an egg waits for the semen.
