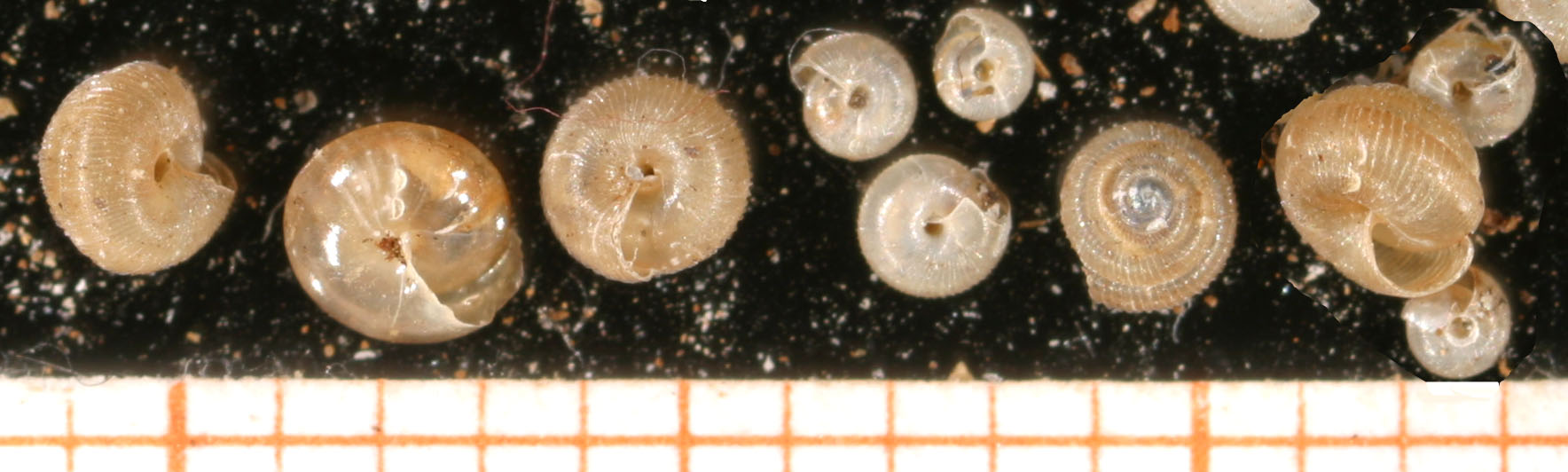
- Numerous shells of Spermodea lamellata

Scientific classification
- Kingdom: Animalia
- Phylum: Mollusca
- Class: Gastropoda
- Order: Stylommatophora
- Family: Valloniidae
- Genus: Spermodea; Westerlund, 1902

= Spermodea =

Genus of gastropods

Spermodea is a genus of minute, European, air-breathing land snails, terrestrial pulmonate gastropod molluscs, or micromolluscs, in the family Valloniidae.

== Species ==
Species within the genus Spermodea include:

- Spermodea lamellata (Jeffreys, 1830)
