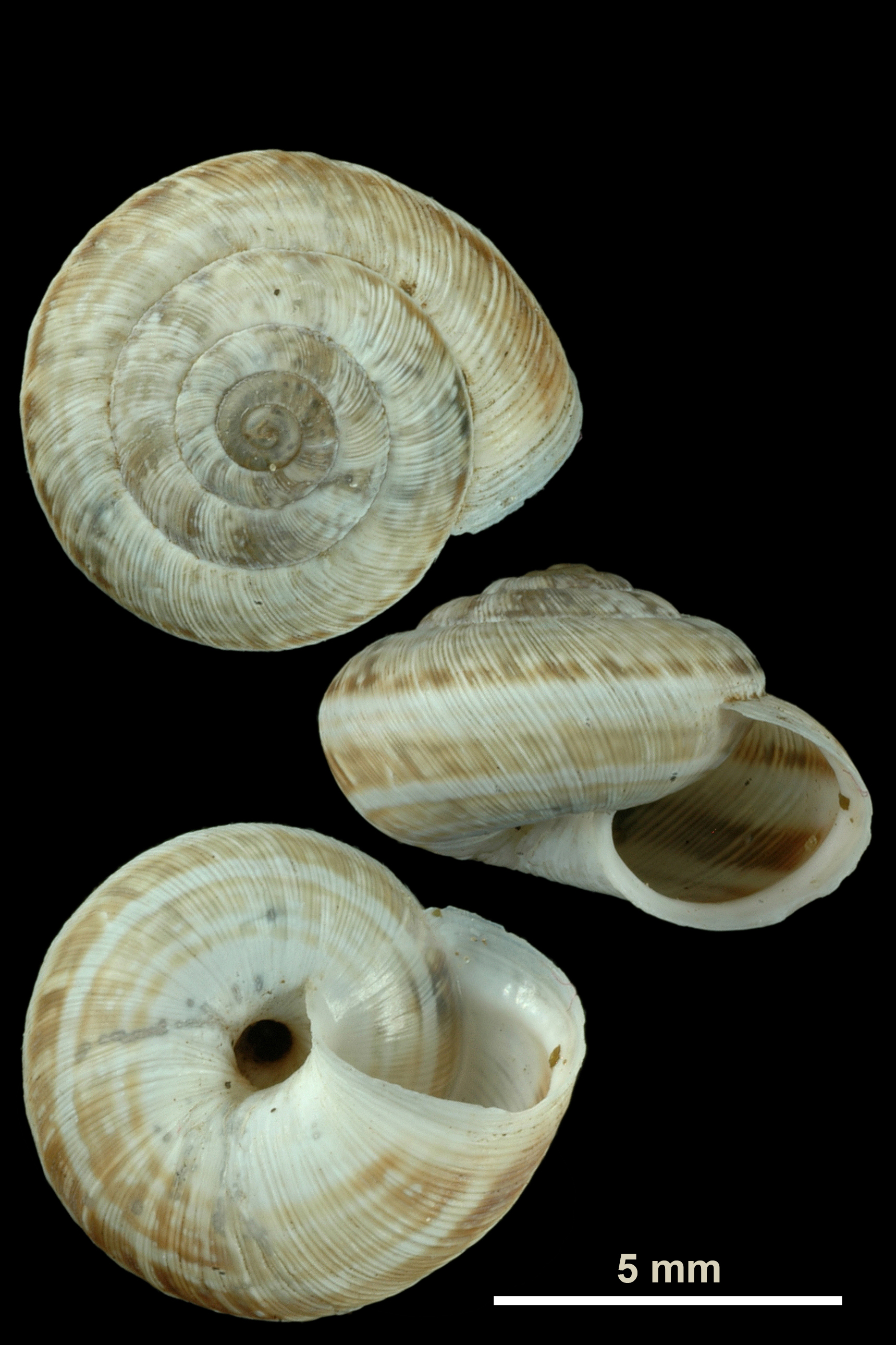
- Backeljaia gigaxii shells (specimen at MNHN, Paris)

Scientific classification
- Kingdom: Animalia
- Phylum: Mollusca
- Class: Gastropoda
- Order: Stylommatophora
- Superfamily: Helicoidea
- Family: Geomitridae
- Genus: Backeljaia
- Species: B. gigaxii

Binomial name
- Backeljaia gigaxii (L. Pfeiffer, 1847)

Synonyms
- Candidula gigaxii (L. Pfeiffer, 1847) (invalid combination); Glischrus (Helix) gratiosa S. Studer, 1820 · (senior synonym of Helix caperata...); Helicopsis gigaxii (L. Pfeiffer, 1847) · (chresonym); Helix acentromphala Bourguignat, in Servain, 1880 · (junior synonym); Helix andalusica Kobelt, 1882 · (junior synonym); Helix caperata var. gigaxii L. Pfeiffer, 1847 (original combination); Helix gigaxii L. Pfeiffer, 1847 · ( combination); Helix hispalina Servain, 1880 · (junior synonym); Helix limatula Locard, 1899 · (junior synonym); Helix phlomiphila Mabille, 1881 · (junior synonym); Helix ramburi Mabille, 1867 · (junior synonym); Helix saxaea Bourguignat in Locard, 1894 · (junior synonym); Helix saxaea var. nicaeensis Caziot, 1909 · (suspected synonym); Helix valcourtiana Bourguignat in Servain, 1880 · (junior synonym); Helix xenilica Servain, 1880 ·

= Backeljaia gigaxii =

Species of gastropod

Backeljaia gigaxii is a species of air-breathing land snail, terrestrial pulmonate gastropod mollusc in the family Geomitridae.

== Description ==
The 5.4-8.1 × 7.4-12.2 mm. shell of this species has, in comparison with Candidula intersecta, whorls that increase more rapidly, the inside of the umbilicus is very narrow, but remarkably wider at last whorl. The shell is light brown or sandy-coloured with pale colour bands. It is usually flatter and larger than the shell of C. intersecta.

== Distribution ==
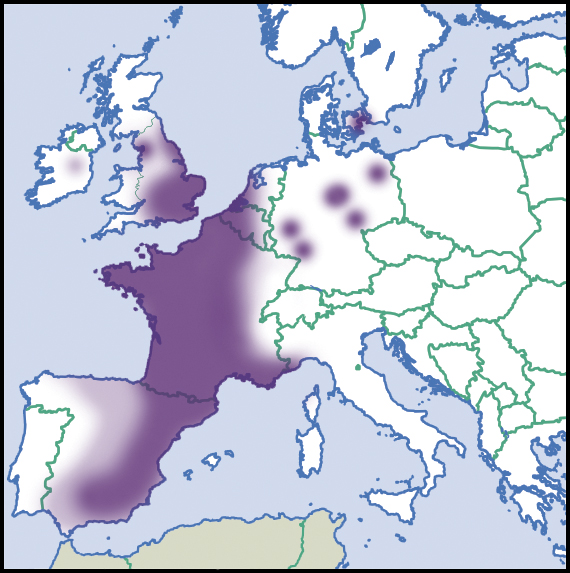
Distribution

This species is known to occur in a number of Western European countries and islands including:

- Great Britain
- Ireland
- France
- Italy
- Belgium
- Netherlands
- Germany
- Spain
