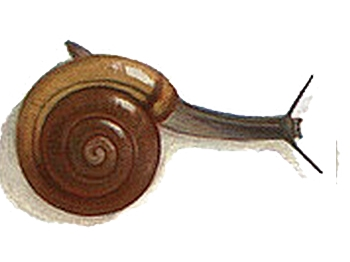

Scientific classification
- Kingdom: Animalia
- Phylum: Mollusca
- Class: Gastropoda
- Order: Stylommatophora
- Family: Gastrodontidae
- Genus: Zonitoides
- Species: Z. excavatus

Binomial name
- Zonitoides excavatus ([Alder, 1830])

Synonyms
- Helix excavata Alder, 1830; Zonitoides (Zonitoides) excavatus (Alder, 1830) · alternate representation

= Zonitoides excavatus =

Species of gastropod

Zonitoides excavatus is a European species of small, air-breathing land snail, a terrestrial pulmonate gastropod mollusk in the family Gastrodontidae.

== Distribution ==
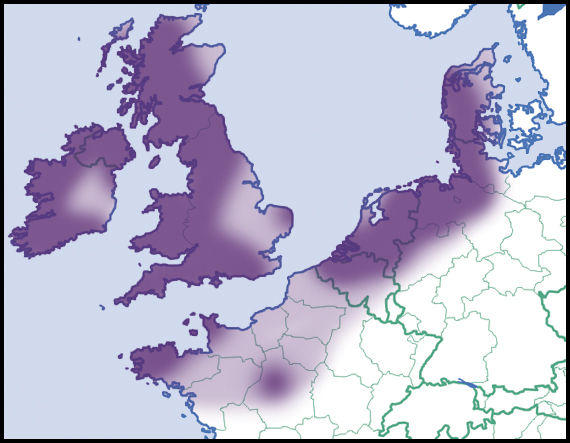
Distribution

Distribution of Zonitoides excavatus include:

- British Isles: Great Britain and Ireland. In Britain it restricted to a few regions, but frequent in the zones where it occurs (Cornwall, south of London, west Wales, Eastern, southwest and northwest Ireland, specifically Portman, Clonee, Clonakilty and Clare island, central England, southwest Scotland).
- On the redlist in Ireland of species under threat, Endangered in Germany (2009).
- Netherlands
- Denmark
- Belgium
- northern France.

== Description ==
Zonitoides excavatus is smaller than Zonitoides nitidus. The flat and shiny shell is tightly coiled. It is weakly brown or greenish brown, slightly transparent, with radial streaks. The umbilicus is extremely wide and perspectivically open (as is the case in Discus rotundatus). The animal is dark.

The width of the shell is 5.3–7 mm (0.21–0.28 in), and the height of the shell is 2.8–3.4 mm (0.11–0.13 in).

== Ecology ==
Zonitoides excavatus lives in leaf litter and under dead wood in old natural forests, sometimes also in swamps (western Ireland and western Great Britain). It lives only on non-calcareous, acid soils. It tolerates some degree of human disturbance and replanting, but usually not in forest plantations.
