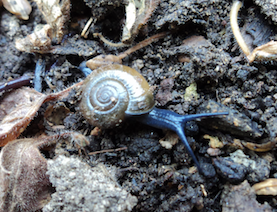

Scientific classification
- Kingdom: Animalia
- Phylum: Mollusca
- Class: Gastropoda
- Order: Stylommatophora
- Family: Oxychilidae
- Genus: Oxychilus
- Species: O. navarricus

Binomial name
- Oxychilus navarricus (Bourguignat, 1870)

Synonyms
- Zonites Navarricus Bourguignat, 1870; Hyalina (Polita) helvetica Blum, 1881; Oxychilus helveticus (Blum, 1881); Oxychilus navarricus helveticus

= Oxychilus navarricus =

Oxychilus navarricus External images

Species of gastropod

Oxychilus navarricus, before 2002 known as Oxychilus helveticus (Blum, 1881), is a species of small air-breathing land snail, a terrestrial pulmonate gastropod mollusk in the family Oxychilidae, the glass snails.

== Description ==
For terms see gastropod shell.

The 4.5–6 by 7–13 mm (0.18–0.24 by 0.28–0.51 in) shell is thin and a light horny yellowish colour. It is whitish near the umbilicus and very shiny, almost smooth. The outline is almost globulous. There are 4.5-6 weakly convex whorls with weak suture. The last whorl width is 1.5x or less of the preceding whorl which is well rounded at lower side. The umbilicus is not very wide, 1/8–1/7 of diameter. Genitalia: internal ornamentation of proximal penis consisting of more than seven longitudinal pleats, sometimes straight and distinct, sometimes wavy, slender and connected by lateral projections giving a reticulate appearance.

== Distribution ==
This species is known to occur in a number of countries and islands including:

- Great Britain
- Ireland
- The Netherlands
- Switzerland
- Canada - introduced
- and other areas
