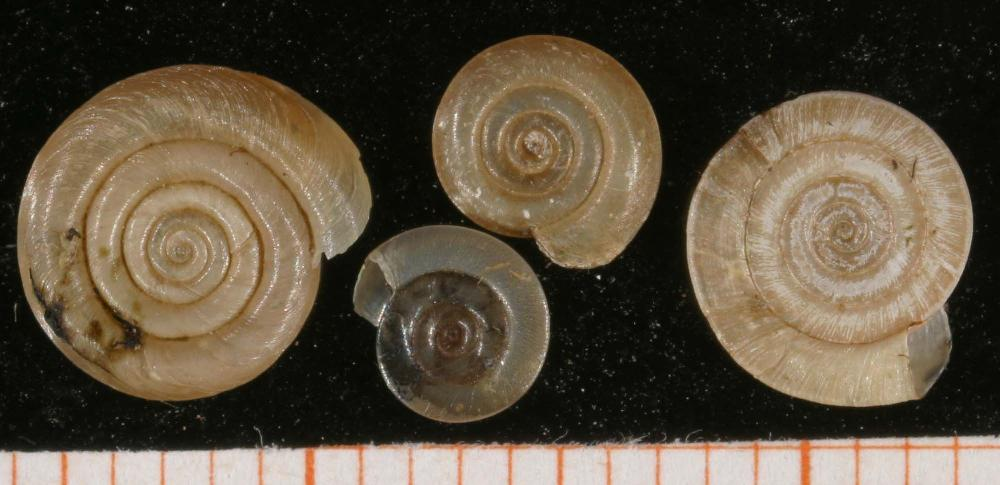
- Shells of Anisus vortex

Scientific classification
- Kingdom: Animalia
- Phylum: Mollusca
- Class: Gastropoda
- Superorder: Hygrophila
- Family: Planorbidae
- Genus: Anisus
- Species: A. vortex

Binomial name
- Anisus vortex (Linnaeus, 1758)

Synonyms
- Helix vortex Linnaeus, 1758

= Anisus vortex =

Species of gastropod

Anisus vortex is a species of small freshwater snail, an aquatic gastropod mollusk in the family Planorbidae, the ram's horn snails and their allies.

== Description ==
The shell is only 0.8 to 1.1 mm high and measures up to 9 mm in diameter. It has up to 7 whorls. The shell is flattened at the functional lower side, concave at the upper side. On the top, the whorls are flat, separated only by a slightly pronounced seam. On the bottom, however, the whorls are more curved and separated by a distinct suture. Shell with very sharp keel.

== Distribution ==
The range of this species is from Europe across the Palearctic to Siberia. It occurs in countries and islands including:

- Belgium
- Czech Republic - least concern (LC)
- Germany
- Great Britain
- Ireland
- The Netherlands
- Poland
- Slovakia
