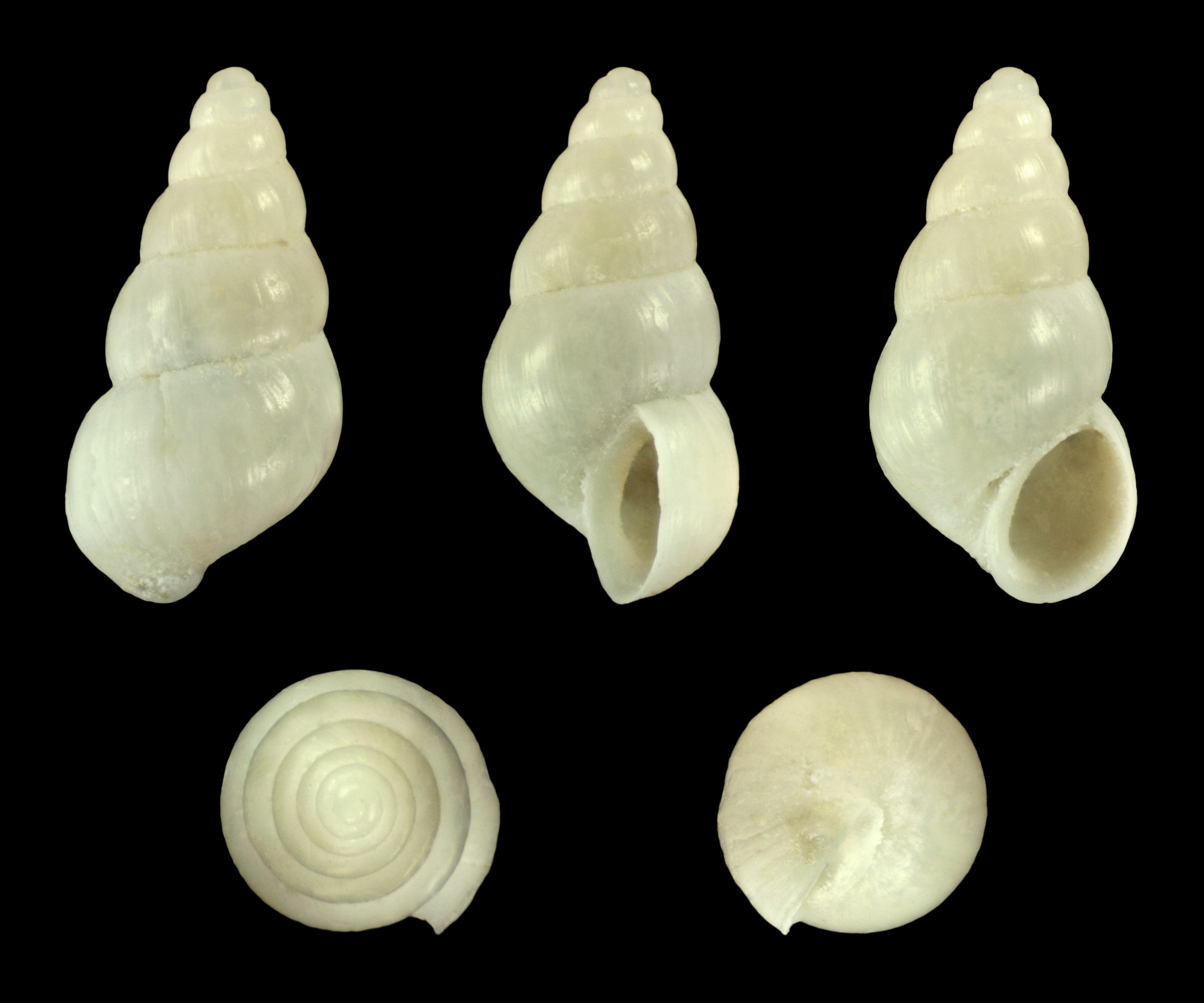
- A shell of Ecrobia ventrosa.

Scientific classification
- Kingdom: Animalia
- Phylum: Mollusca
- Class: Gastropoda
- Subclass: Caenogastropoda
- Order: Littorinimorpha
- Family: Hydrobiidae
- Genus: Ecrobia
- Species: E. ventrosa

Binomial name
- Ecrobia ventrosa (Montagu, 1803)

Synonyms
- Ventrosia ventrosa (Montagu, 1803); Hydrobia atuca Boeters, 1988; Hydrobia ventrosa (Montagu, 1803)

= Ecrobia ventrosa =

Species of gastropod

Ecrobia ventrosa, common name spire snail, is a European species of small brackish water snail with a gill and an operculum, an aquatic gastropod mollusk in the family Hydrobiidae.

== Distribution ==
This species occurs on the coasts of:

- Iceland
- Norway
- Great Britain
- Ireland
- France
- Baltic Sea
- Black Sea
- White Sea

The distribution type is coastal Mediterranean–Atlantic.

== Description ==
For terms see gastropod shell

The 3–4 x 1.5–2 mm. shell has 5–7 convex whorls which are slightly more convex than those of Hydrobia acuta neglecta. Smaller shells with 5 whorls are slightly less slender than those of Hydrobia neglecta. The suture is deep. The aperture is rounded upside (or only slightly pointed) and attached to the last whorl. The lip is weakly developed. The shell is very finely striated and in colour translucent, glossy yellow-brown, usually hidden by a matt deposit.

Certain identification requires dissection. The penis has a pointed tip, not a blunt tip as in Hydrobia acuta neglecta.
