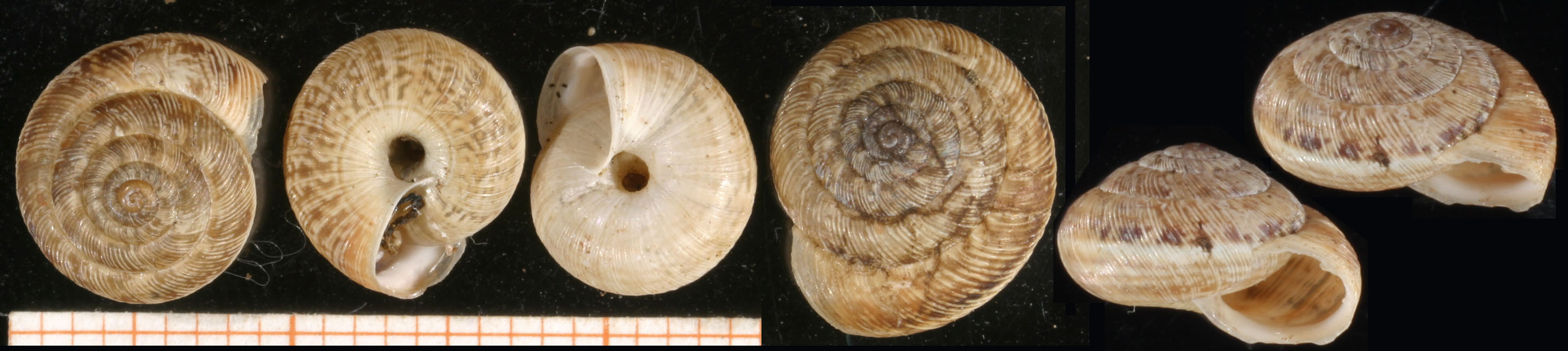
- Xeroplexa intersecta shells

Conservation status
- Least Concern (IUCN 3.1)

- Secure (NatureServe)

Scientific classification
- Kingdom: Animalia
- Phylum: Mollusca
- Class: Gastropoda
- Order: Stylommatophora
- Family: Geomitridae
- Genus: Xeroplexa
- Species: X. intersecta

Binomial name
- Xeroplexa intersecta (Poiret, 1801)

Synonyms
- Candidula intersecta (Poiret, 1801); Helix (Xerophila) caperata (Montagu, 1803) (superseded generic combination); Helix (Xerophila) caperata var. mogadorensis Lowe, 1861 (junior synonym); Helix caperata Montagu, 1803; Helix carcusiaca Mabille, 1881; Helix carcusiaca var. lingostierensis Caziot, 1909 (suspected synonym); Helix deferiana Bourguignat [in Locard], 1882; Helix expedenta Locard, 1899; Helix ignota Mabille, 1865; Helix imula Locard, 1899; Helix intersecta Poiret, 1801; Helix paladilhei Bourguignat, 1866; Helix pictonum Bourguignat [in Locard], 1882; Helix subintersecta Bourguignat in Locard, 1882; Xerophila mogadorensis (Lowe, 1861) (superseded generic combination); Xerophila mogadorensis var. fusca Pallary, 1922 (junior synonym)

= Xeroplexa intersecta =

Species of gastropod

Xeroplexa intersecta, commonly known has wrinkled snail is a species of air-breathing land snail, a terrestrial pulmonate gastropod mollusk in the family Geomitridae.

It was previously included within the genus Candidula.

This snail can be a pest species in agricultural settings.

== Description ==
The 4–7 mm (0.16–0.28 in) × 7–12 mm (0.28–0.47 in) shell has 5 convex whorls. The aperture is simple without a lip; the aperture margin is slightly reflected near the umbilicus. The umbilicus is open and variably wide. The periostracum is whitish or yellowish with brown bands or spots and finely striated. The animal is yellowish or bluish grey with dark brown pigments. The upper tentacles are long, and the lower tentacles are very short.

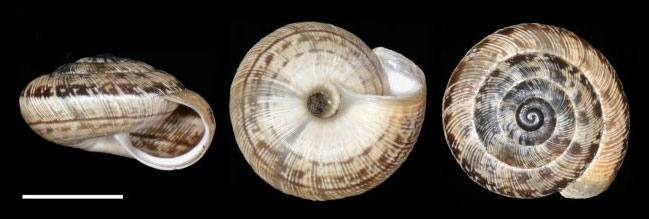
Xeroplexa intersecta Botanic Gardens, Cambridge (England). Scale bar 0.5 cm.

== Distribution ==
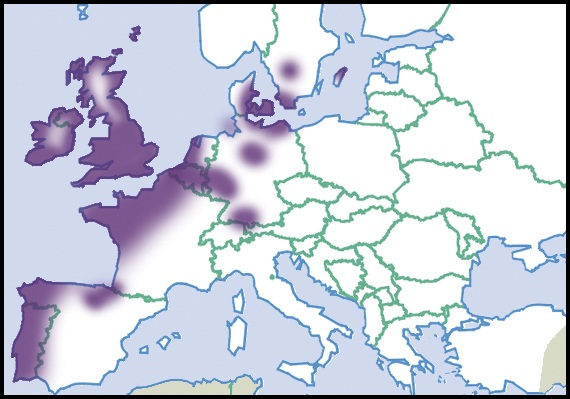
Distribution

This species is known to occur within its native range in a number of Central and Western European countries and islands including:

- Great Britain
- Ireland
- France
- Portugal
- Belgium
- Netherlands
- Denmark
- Spain
- Germany

It also lives as an introduced species in:

- Oregon, United States
- Colombia
- Chile
- New Zealand
- Australia
