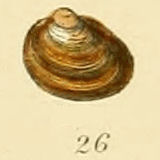

Scientific classification
- Kingdom: Animalia
- Phylum: Mollusca
- Class: Bivalvia
- Order: Sphaeriida
- Family: Sphaeriidae
- Genus: Pisidium
- Species: P. pulchellum

Binomial name
- Pisidium pulchellum Jenyns, 1832

= Pisidium pulchellum =

Species of bivalve

Pisidium pulchellum, the iridescent pea mussel, is a minute species of pea clam, a freshwater bivalve in the family Sphaeriidae.

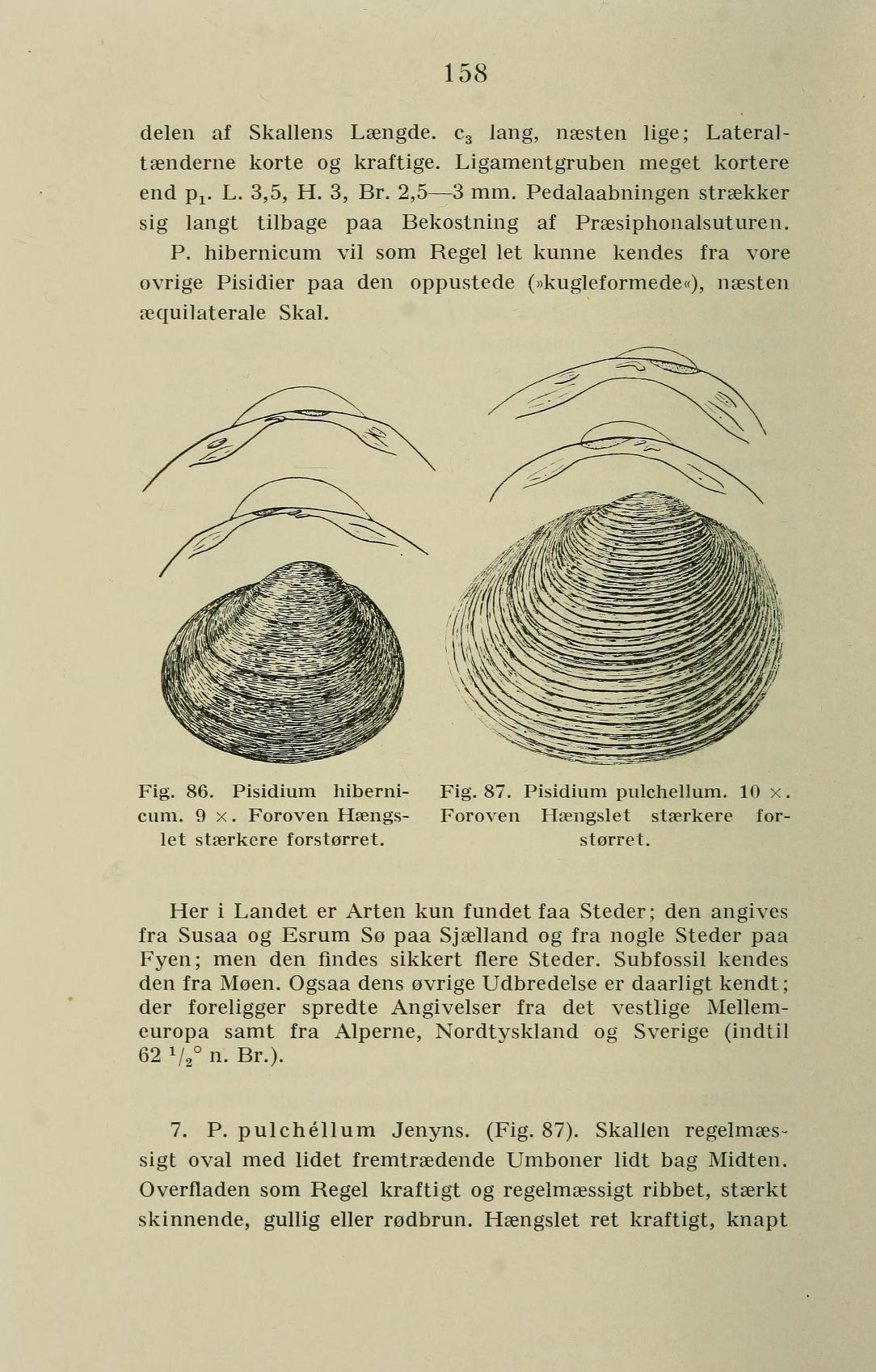
Pisidium hibernicum and P. pulchellum in Danmarks Fauna

== Description ==
The 3.5–4 mm shell is tumid (swollen), oblique-oval shell. The umbos are broad well and well behind the midpoint. The surface (periostracum) is glossy with regular concentric ribbing. The colour is grey to cream tinged and pinkvor orange from the animal inside.

== Distribution and conservation status ==
- Not listed in IUCN red list – not evaluated (NE)
- Germany – critically endangered (vom Aussterben bedroht)
- Nordic countries: Denmark, Finland, Iceland, Norway and Sweden (not in Faroes)
- Great Britain and Ireland
