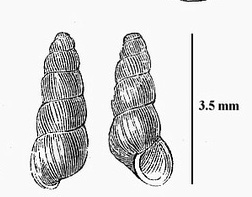

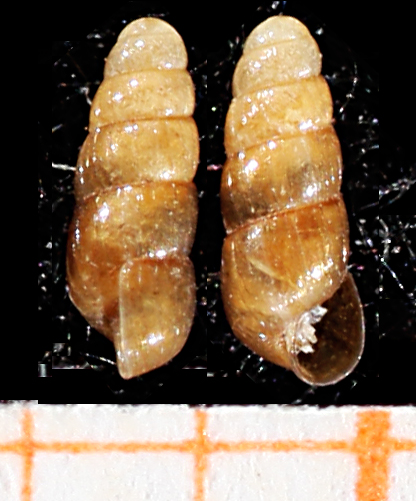

Conservation status
- Least Concern (IUCN 3.1)

Scientific classification
- Kingdom: Animalia
- Phylum: Mollusca
- Class: Gastropoda
- Subclass: Caenogastropoda
- Order: Architaenioglossa
- Family: Aciculidae
- Genus: Acicula
- Species: A. fusca

Binomial name
- Acicula fusca (Montagu, 1803)

Synonyms
- Acme lineata var. pyrenaica de Folin & Bérillon, 1877; Turbo fuscus Montagu, 1803

= Acicula fusca =

Species of gastropod

Acicula fusca is a species of land snail in the family Aciculidae. It is known by the common name point snail. It is native to Europe, where it occurs in Britain, Ireland, France south to the Basses Pyrénées, Spain, Belgium, and north-west Germany. Commonest in the west. The distribution type is Oceanic Temperate.

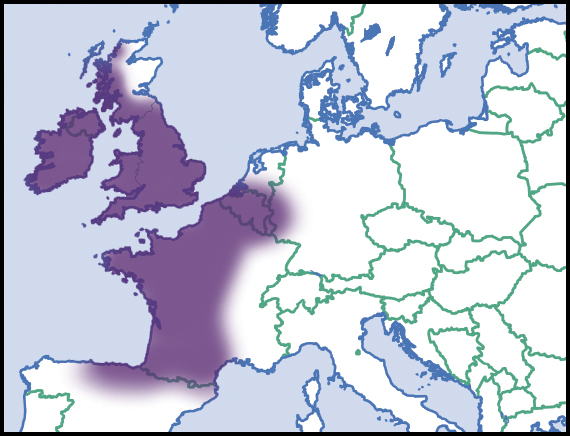
Distribution map

== Shell description ==
For terms see gastropod shell.

The shell is about 2 to 3 millimeters wide, with 6 whorls and shallow sutures. The apex is blunt. The penultimate whorl is striated with 15 to 23 lines and the aperture climbs only slightly at the penultimate whorl. The apertural margin is not thickened inside, the callus does not cover the umbilicus, the angularis is very weak, the parietal callus is weak or absent, no cervical callus is present. There is a minute translucent operculum. The surface is smooth, glossy, reddish to yellowish-brown.

== Habitat ==
This species lives in wet moss and leaf litter in woodlands on calcareous soils. Because it is minute, it is easily overlooked.
