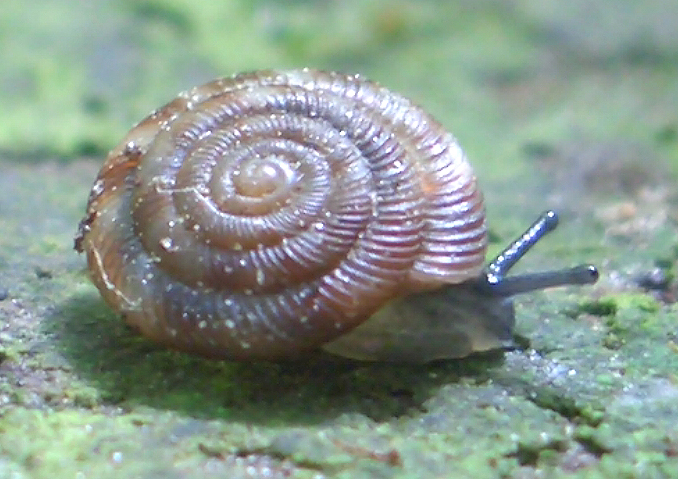
- A live Discus rotundatus

Conservation status
- Least Concern (IUCN 3.1)

- Secure (NatureServe)

Scientific classification
- Kingdom: Animalia
- Phylum: Mollusca
- Class: Gastropoda
- Order: Stylommatophora
- Family: Discidae
- Genus: Discus
- Species: D. rotundatus

Binomial name
- Discus rotundatus (O. F. Müller, 1774)

Synonyms
- Goniodiscus rotundatus; Patula rotundata Müller, 1774.; Helix abietina Bourguignat, 1864; Patula azorica Mousson, 1858; Helix machadoi Milne-Edwards, 1885

= Discus rotundatus =

Species of gastropod

Discus rotundatus, common name rotund disc, is a species of small, air-breathing, land snail, a terrestrial pulmonate gastropod mollusk in the family Discidae, the disk snails.

== Description ==
The shells of Discus rotundatus in the adult stage measure 5.7–7 millimetres (0.22–0.28 in) in diameter and 2.4–6 millimetres (0.094–0.236 in) in height. Shells are reddish brown with darker cross bands, flat and densely ribbed. The umbilicus is quite wide, reaching about one-third of the shell diameter.

Among the species of Discus in Europe and North America, Discus rotundatus is recognized by the alternating pattern of reddish brown spots, tight coiling of the whorls and broad and shallow umbilicus.

The body of this gastropod is bluish black on the upperside, while the lower side is greyish white. They mainly feed on plant debris, humus, algae and fungi.

== Life cycle ==
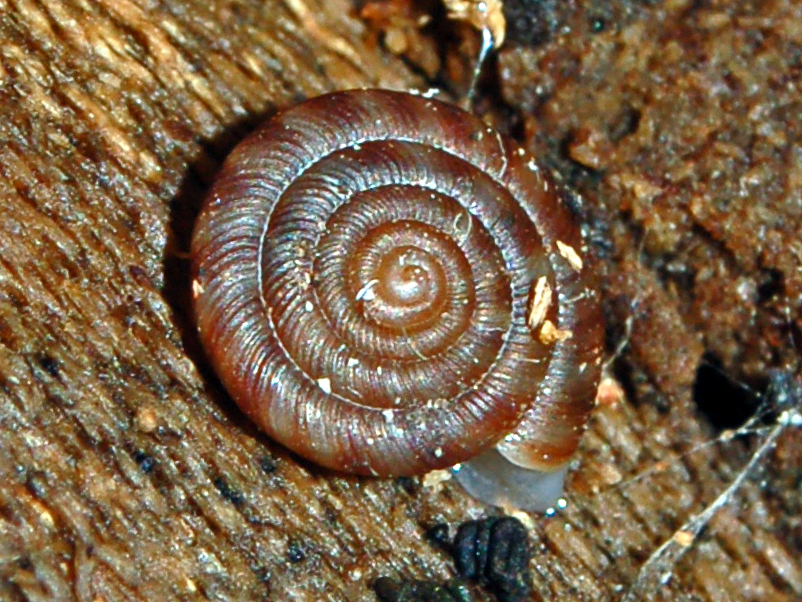
Shell of Discus rotundatus

These snails, like most terrestrial gastropods, are hermaphrodite. The reproductive season lasts from May to October. Usually they lay 20–50 eggs in rotting wood or below decaying leaves. Eggs are white and flattened, measure about 1 mm and hatch after 10–30 days. These gastropods reach their maturity only in the second or third season and can live 2–3 years. Unlike many terrestrial snails they do not have a sex dart.

== Distribution ==
This species lives in Western and Central Europe. It is found in the Czech Republic, Poland, Ukraine and Slovakia. It is also found in Great Britain, Ireland, France, Italy, southern Scandinavia, and other countries. Its range includes Turkey.

The species has been introduced to North America where it was first found in 1937 and now is known from six Canadian provinces (British Columbia, Ontario, Quebec, New Brunswick, Nova Scotia, and Newfoundland and Labrador) and 16 states, as well as the District of Columbia, in the United States. It does not appear to have the capability to become an invasive pest species in North America, as it lives in leaf litter and forms colonies where the individuals do not tend to spread widely.

== Habitat ==
These gastropods live in forests and humid shady places, in dead wood logs, under stones, on humus and in soil litter, sometimes in colonies, at an elevation of 0–2,100 metres (0–6,890 ft) above sea level. They can live both in natural habitats and in environments modified by humans, like gardens. The species can tolerate substrate which is non-calcareous.

== Subspecies ==
- Discus rotundatus rotundatus (O. F. Müller, 1774)
- Discus rotundatus omalisma (Fagot, 1879)
