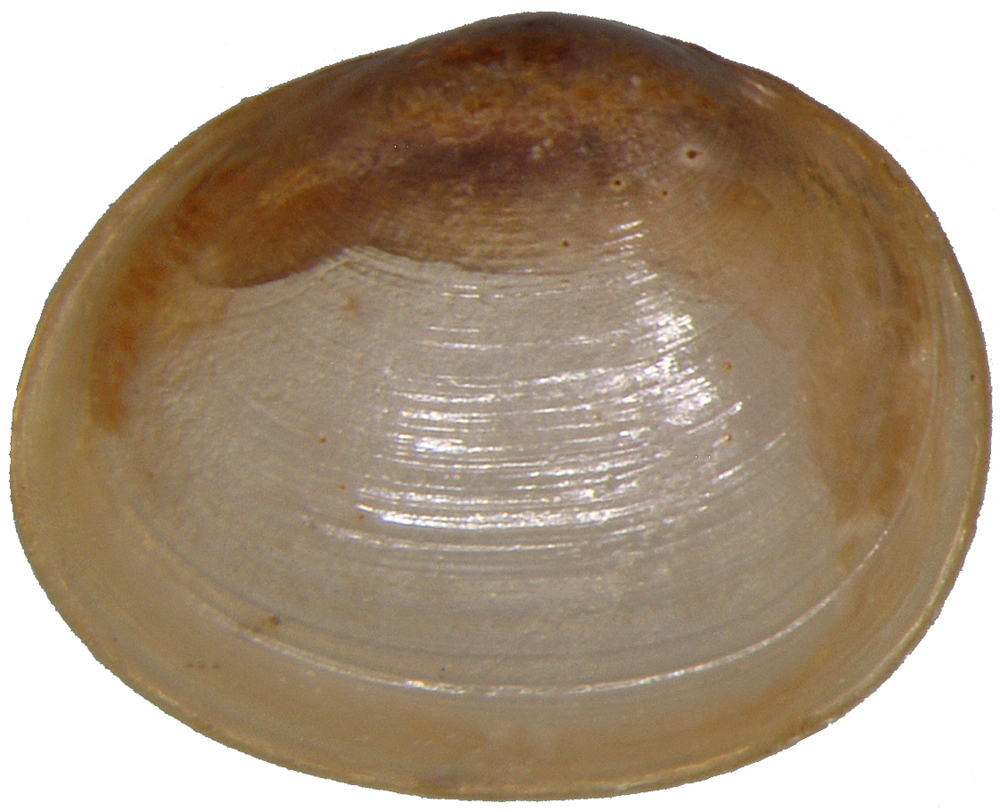
- Photo of external view of the left valve of Pisidium pseudosphaerium
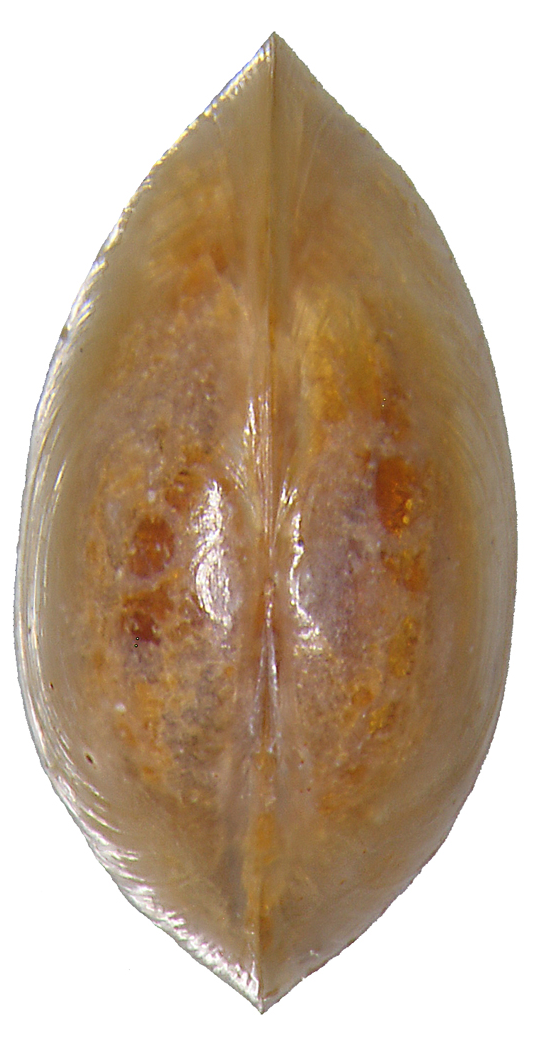
- Photo of external umbilical view of both valves of Pisidium pseudosphaerium. (Left valve is on the lef, right valve is on the right.)

Conservation status
- Least Concern (IUCN 3.1)

Scientific classification
- Kingdom: Animalia
- Phylum: Mollusca
- Class: Bivalvia
- Order: Sphaeriida
- Family: Sphaeriidae
- Genus: Pisidium
- Species: P. pseudosphaerium

Binomial name
- Pisidium pseudosphaerium Favre, 1927

= Pisidium pseudosphaerium =

Species of bivalve

Pisidium pseudosphaerium is a species of freshwater bivalve from family Sphaeriidae.

== Description ==
The 2.5-3.2mm shell is a flattened, regular, slightly angulated oval shape with low central umbos. The surface is silky with very fine concentric striations. In colour it is straw-yellow with scattered red-brown deposits.

== Distribution ==
Its native distribution is central European and western European.

- Czech Republic - in Bohemia, in Moravia, critically endangered (CR)
- Germany - critically endangered (vom Aussterben bedroht)
- Nordic countries: Denmark, Finland (near threatened), Norway and Sweden (not recorded in Faroes, Iceland)
- Great Britain and Ireland
