= Pisidium personatum =

- Pisidium personatum

Scientific classification
- Kingdom: Animalia
- Phylum: Mollusca
- Class: Bivalvia
- Order: Sphaeriida
- Family: Sphaeriidae
- Genus: Pisidium
- Species: P. personatum

Binomial name
- Pisidium personatum Malm, 1855

Species of bivalve

Pisidium personatum is a species of freshwater bivalve from the family Sphaeriidae.

== Description ==
The 2.5-3.5 mm shell is a characteristic round-regular oval shape. It has centrally placed low, rounded umbos. The surface (periostracum) is dull or silky with very fine irregular concentric striations. The colour is yellowish to greyish but it is invariably coated in a red-brown to dark brown deposit.

== Distribution ==
Its native distribution is European-Siberian.

- Czech Republic – in Bohemia, in Moravia, least concern (LC)
- Germany – distributed in all of Germany but in 5 states in red list (Rote Liste BRD).
- Nordic countries: Denmark, Faroes, Finland (near threatened), Iceland, Norway and Sweden
- Great Britain and Ireland
