= List of non-marine molluscs of Canada =

The non-marine mollusks of Canada are a part of the molluscan fauna of Canada (wildlife of Canada). A number of species of non-marine mollusks are found in the wild in Canada.

== Freshwater gastropods ==
Valvatidae

- Valvata lewisi (Currier, 1868)
  - Valvata lewisi lewisi
- Valvata sincera sincera
- Valvata tricarinata (Say, 1817)

Radix

- Radix auricularia (invasive)

Lymnaeidae

- Bulimnea megasoma (Say, 1824)
- Fossaria dalli (F. C. Baker, 1907)
- Fossaria galbana (Say, 1825)
- Fossaria modicella (Say, 1825)
- Lymnaea stagnalis (Linnaeus, 1758)
  - Lymnaea stagnalis appressa (Say, 1821)
- Stagnicola caperata (Say 1829)
- Stagnicola catascopium catascopium
- Stagnicola elodes (Say, 1821)
- Stagnicola exilis (Lea, 1834)
- Stagnicola palustris (O. F. Müller, 1774)

Physidae

- Aplexa elongata (Say 1821)
- Aplexa hypnorum (Linnaeus, 1758)
- Physa skinneri Taylor, 1954
- Physella gyrina (Say, 1821)

Planorbidae

- Ferrissia fragilis (Tryon, 1863)
- Ferrissia parallela (Haldeman, 1841)
- Ferrissia rivularis (Say, 1817)
- Gyraulus circumstriatus (Tryon, 1866)
- Gyraulus crista (Linnaeus, 1758)
- Gyraulus deflectus (Say, 1824)
- Gyraulus parvus (Say, 1817)
- Helisoma anceps anceps
- Helisoma antrosa (Conrad, 1834)
- Helisoma campanulata (Say, 1821)
- Helisoma trivolvis (Say, 1817)
- Menetus opercularis (Gould, 1847)
- Planorbella binneyi (Tryon, 1867)
- Planorbella pilsbryi infracarinatum (F.C. Baker, 1932)
- Planorbella subcrenata (Carpenter, 1857)
- Planorbella campanulata (Say, 1821)
- Planorbula armigera (Say, 1821)
- Planorbula campestris (Dawson, 1875)
- Promenetus exacuous (Say, 1821)
  - Promenetus exacuous exacuous
  - Promenetus exacuous megas (Dall, 1905)
- Promenetus umbilicatellus (Cockerell, 1887)

== Land gastropods ==
Inflectarius

- Inflectarius inflectus (Say, 1821)

Ellobiidae

- Carychium exiguum (Say, 1822)
- Carychium exile (H. C. Lea, 1842)
- Carychium minimum (O.F. Müller, 1774)

Succineidae

- Mediappendix vermeta (Say, 1829)
- Novisuccinea ovalis (Say, 1817)
- Oxyloma retusum (I. Lea, 1834)

Cochlicopidae

- Cochlicopa lubrica (Müller, 1774)

Lauriidae

- Lauria cylindracea (da Costa, 1778)

Pupillidae

- Pupilla blandii (Morse, 1865)
- Pupilla hudsonianum (Nekola & Coles in Nekola, Coles & Horsák, 2015)
- Pupilla muscorum (Linnaeus, 1758)
- Pupoides albilabris (C.B. Adams, 1841)

Strobilopsidae

- Strobilops labyrinthicus (Say, 1817)

Valloniidae

- Planogyra clappi (Pilsbry, 1898)
- Vallonia costata (Müller, 1774)
- Vallonia excentrica (Sterki, 1893)
- Vallonia gracilicosta (Reinhardt, 1883)
- Vallonia pulchella (Müller, 1774)
- Zoogenetes harpa (Say, 1824)

Chondrinidae

- Columella columella (G. von Martens, 1830)
- Columella edentula (Draparnaud, 1805)

Vertiginidae

- Vertigo arthuri (E. von Martens, 1882)
- Vertigo bollesiana (Morse, 1865)
- Vertigo columbiana (Pilsbry and Vanatta, 1900)
- Vertigo cristata (Sterki in Pilsbry, 1919)
- Vertigo elatior (Sterki, 1894)
- Vertigo genesii (Gredler, 1856)
- Vertigo gouldii (A. Binney, 1843)
- Vertigo hannai (Pilsbry, 1919)
- Vertigo modesta (Say, 1824)
- Vertigo oughtoni (Pilsbry, 1948)

Ferussaciidae

- Cecilioides acicula (O.F. Müller, 1774)

Gastrocoptidae

- Gastrocopta contracta (Say, 1822)
- Gastrocopta pentodon (Say, 1822)
- Gastrocopta similis (Sterki, 1909)
- Gastrocopta tappaniana (C.B. Adams, 1841)

Punctidae

- Punctum minutissimum (I. Lea, 1841)
- Punctum randolphii (Dall, 1895)

Discidae

- Anguispira alternata (Say, 1816)
- Anguispira kochi (L. Pfeiffer, 1846)
- Discus catskillensis (Pilsbry, 1896)
- Discus shimekii (Pilsbry, 1890)
- Discus whitneyi (Newcomb, 1864)

Helicodiscidae

- Helicodiscus parallelus (Say, 1821)

Oreohelicidae

- Oreohelix subrudis (Reeve, 1854)

Gastrodontidae

- Aegopinella nitidula (Draparnaud, 1805)
- Nesovitrea binneyana (Morse, 1864)
- Nesovitrea electrina (Gould, 1841)
- Striatura exigua (Stimpson, 1850)
- Striatura ferrea (Morse, 1864)
- Striatura milium (Morse, 1859)
- Striatura pugetensis (Dall, 1895)
- Zonitoides arboreus (Say, 1817)
- Zonitoides nitidus (Müller, 1774)

Haplotrematidae

- Ancotrema hybridum (Ancey, 1888)
- Haplotrema concavum (Say, 1821)
- Haplotrema vancouverense (I. Lea, 1839)

Euconulidae

- Euconulus fulvus (Müller, 1774)
- Euconulus polygyratus (Pilsbry, 1899)
- Guppya sterkii (Dall, 1888)

Oxychilidae

- Oxychilus alliarius (J.S. Miller, 1822)
- Oxychilus cellarius (O.F. Müller, 1774)
- Oxychilus draparnaudi (Beck, 1837)

Pristilomatidae

- Paravitrea multidentata (A. Binney, 1841)
- Pristiloma lansingi (Bland, 1875)
- Pristiloma stearnsii (Bland,1875)
- Vitrea contracta (Westerlund, 1870)

Limacidae

- Limax maximus (Linnaeus, 1758)

Agriolimacidae

- Deroceras laeve (Müller, 1774)
- Deroceras panormitanum (Lessona and Pollonera, 1882)
- Deroceras reticulatum (Müller, 1774)

Polygyridae

- Cryptomastix germana (Gould in A. Binney, 1851)
- Inflectarius inflectus (Say, 1821)
- Neohelix albolabris (Say, 1817)
- Neohelix dentifera (A. Binney, 1837)
- Patera appressa (Say, 1821)
- Vespericola columbiana (I. Lea 1839)
- Xolotrema denotatum (A. Férussac, 1821)

Boettgerillidae

- Boettgerilla pallens (Simroth, 1912)

Vitrinidae

- Vitrina angelicae (Beck, 1837)

Arionidae

- Ariolimax columbianus (Gould in A. Binney, 1851)
- Arion ater (Linnaeus, 1758)
- Arion distinctus (Mabille, 1868)
- Arion hortensis (Férussac, 1819)
- Arion rufus (Linnaeus, 1758)
- Arion subfuscus (Draparnaud,1805)
- Hemphillia glandulosa Bland and W.G. Binney, 1872
- Prophysaon andersonii (J.G. Cooper, 1872)
- Prophysaon coeruleum (Cockerell, 1890)
- Prophysaon foliolatum (Gould in A. Binney, 1851)
- Prophysaon vanattae (Pilsbry,1948)
- Staala gwaii (Ovaska, Chichester & Sopuck, 2010)

Geomitridae

- Xerolenta obvia (Menke, 1828)

Helicidae

- Cepaea nemoralis (Linnaeus, 1758)

== See also ==
- List of marine molluscs of Canada
- List of non-marine molluscs of the United States
