= List of mollusks of Utah =

This is a list of mollusks observed in the U.S. state of Utah.

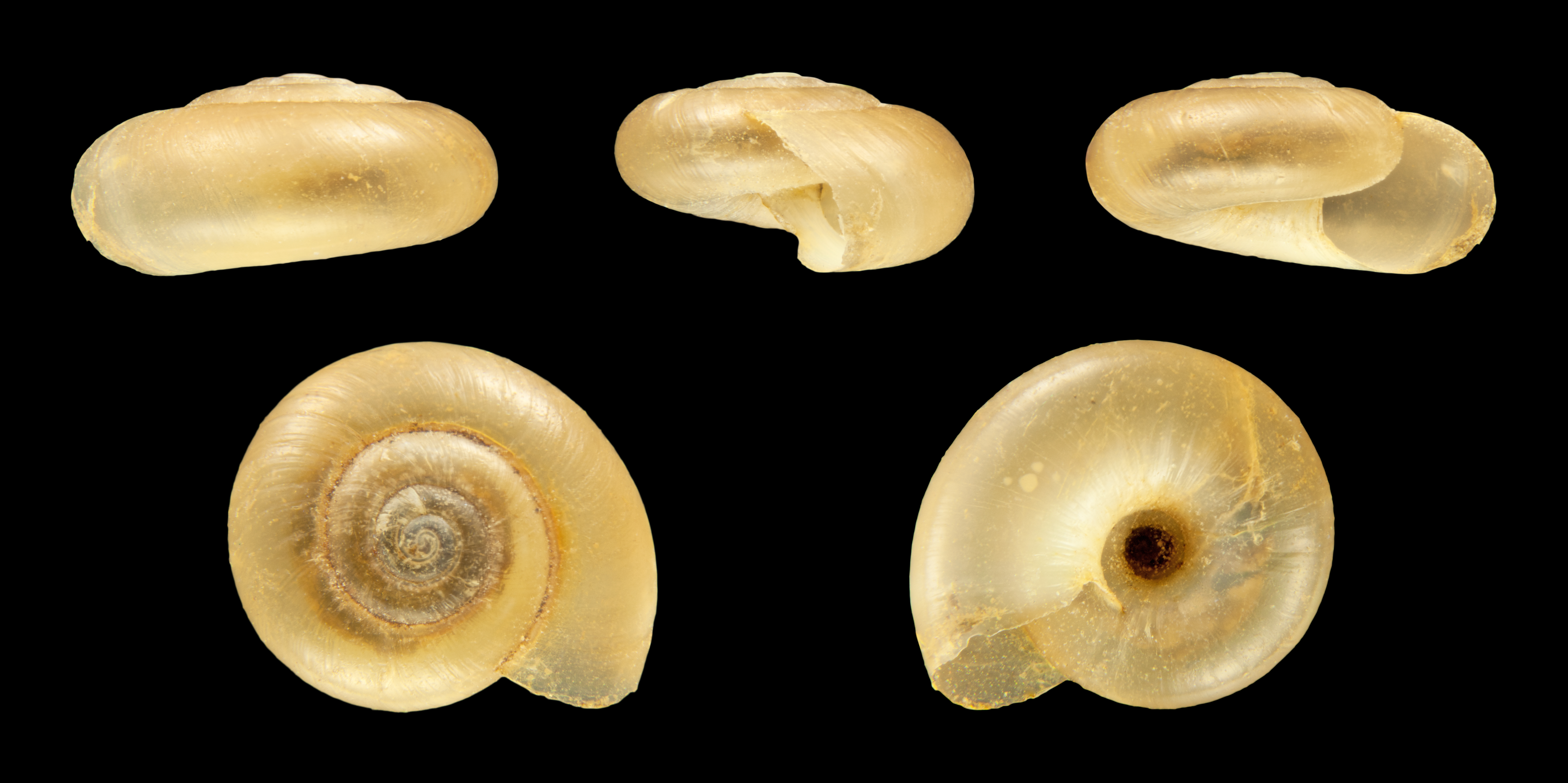
Black gloss

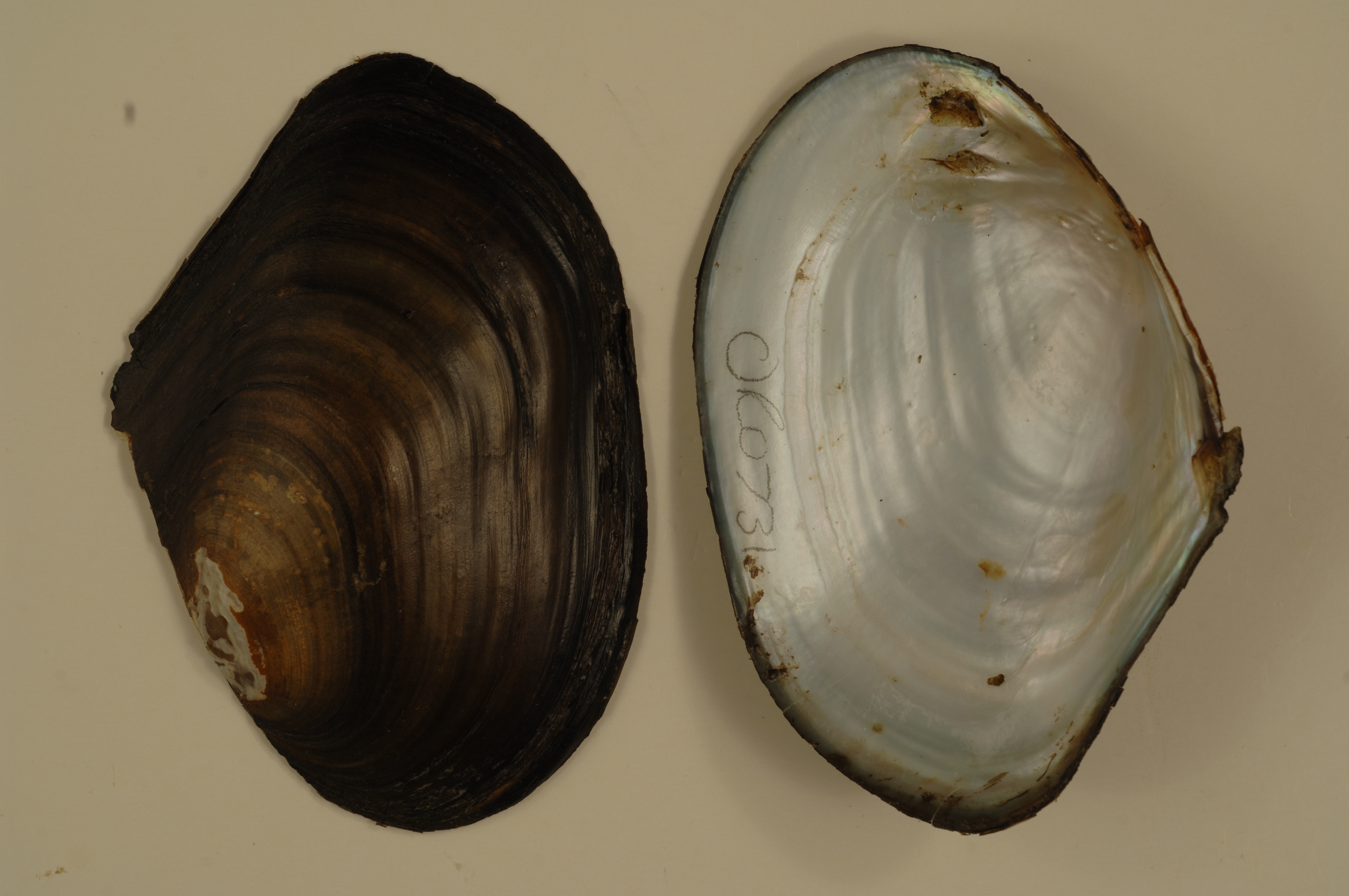
California floater

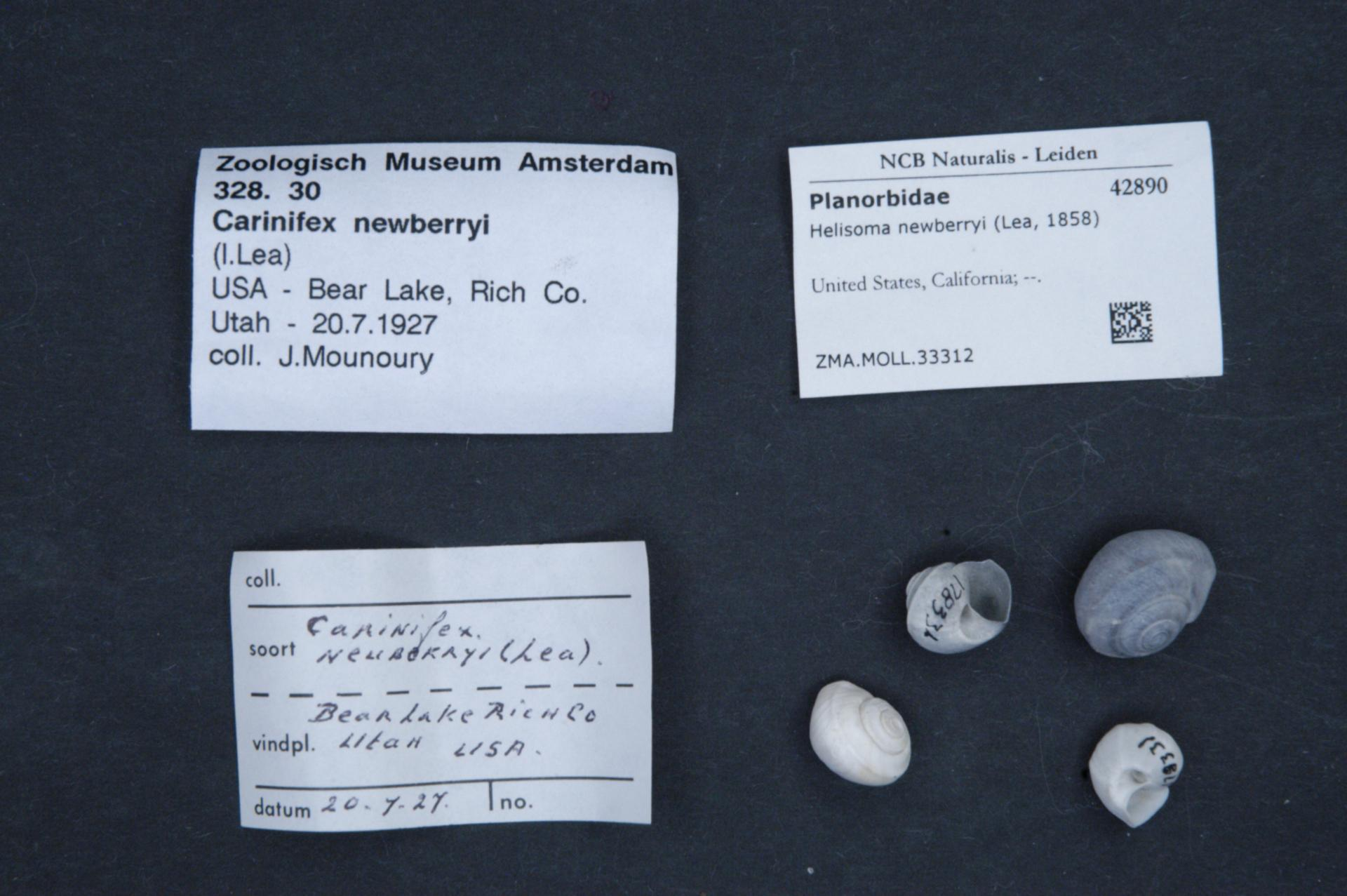
Helisoma newberryi

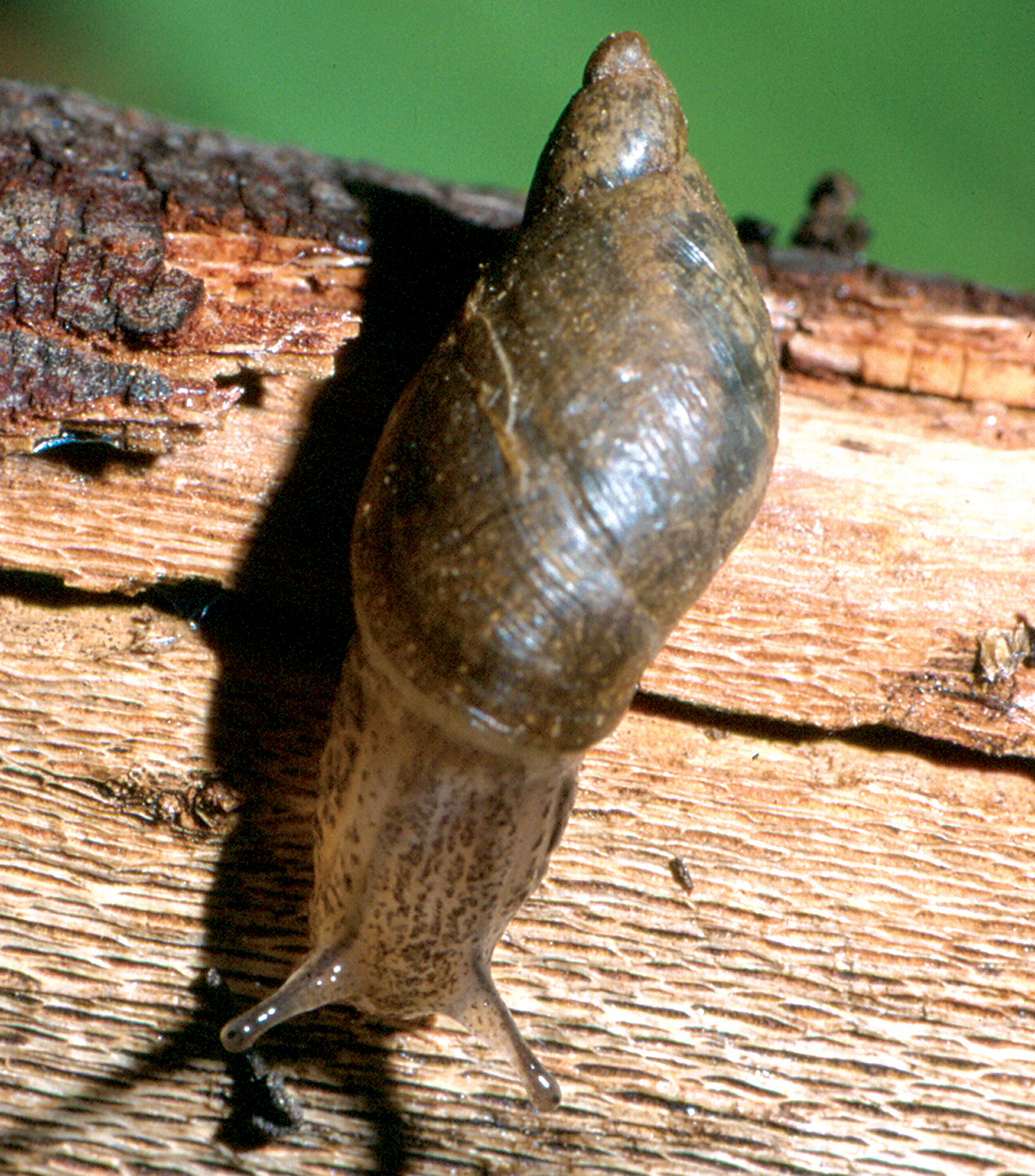
Kanab ambersnail

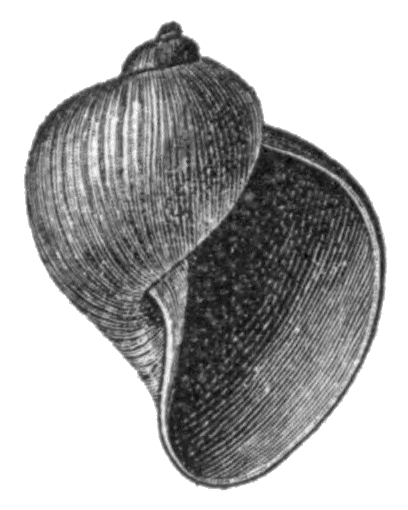
Thickshell pondsnail

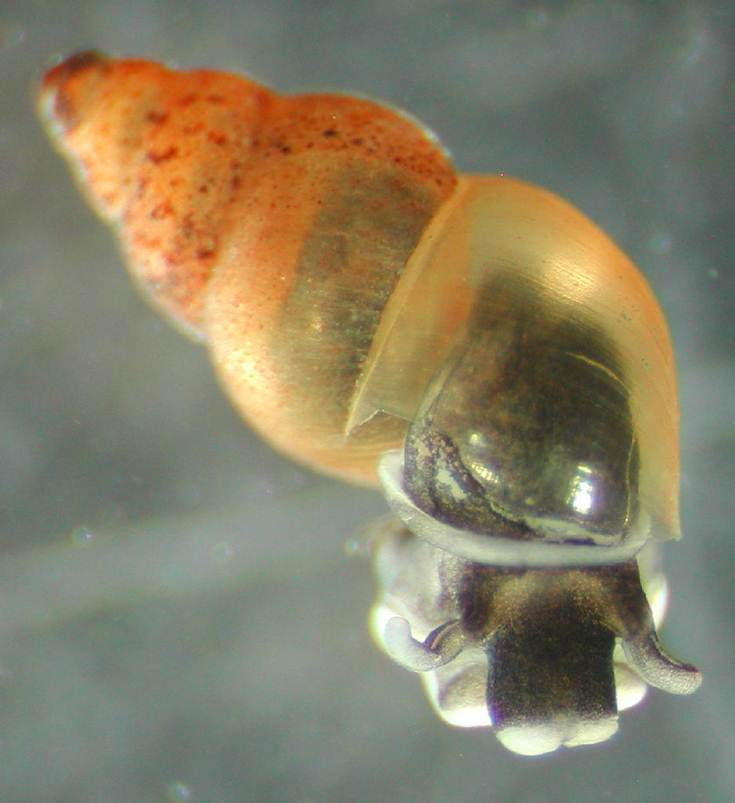
New Zealand mud snail

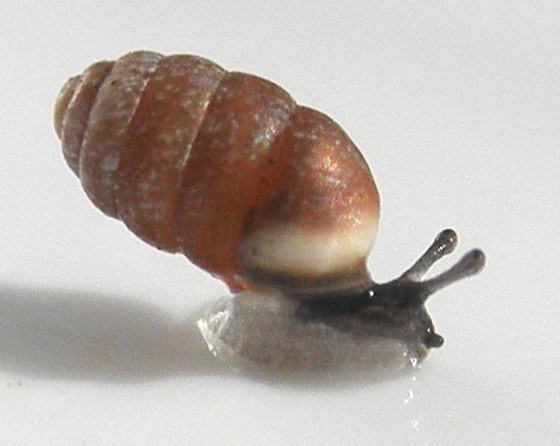
Moss chrysalis snail

- Bear Lake springsnail (Pyrgulopsis pilsbryana)
- Bifid duct pyrg (Pyrgulopsis peculiaris)
- Black Canyon pyrg (Pyrgulopsis plicata)
- Black Gloss (Zonitoides nitidus)
- Brian Head Mountainsnail (Oreohelix parawanensis)
- California floater (Anodonta californiensis)
- Carinate Glenwood pyrg (Pyrgulopsis inopinata)
- Cloaked physa (Physa megalochlamys)
- Coarse Rams-horn (Planorbella binneyi)
- Creeping ancylid (Ferrissia rivularis)
- Crestless column (Pupilla hebes)
- Cross snaggletooth (Gastrocopta quadridens)
- Cross vertigo (Vertigo modesta)
  - V. m. insculpta
  - V. m. corpulenta
  - V. m. parietalis
- Deseret mountainsnail (Oreohelix peripherica)
- Desert springsnail (Pyrgulopsis deserta)
- Desert tryonia (Tryonia porrecta)
- Eureka mountainsnail (Oreohelix eurekensis)
  - O. e. eurekensis
  - O. e. uinta
- Fat-whorled pondsnail (Stagnicola bonnevillensis)
- Fish Lake physa (Physella microstriata)
- Fish Springs marshsnail (Stagnicola pilsbryi)
- Freshwater snail (Fossaria techella)
- Freshwater snail (Fossaria modicella rustica)
- Glass physa (Physa skinneri)
- Glossy valvata (Valvata humeralis californica)
- Great Basin rams-horn (Helisoma newberryi)
- Green River pebblesnail (Fluminicola coloradoensis)
- Hamlin Valley pyrg (Pyrgulopsis hamlinensis)
- Kanab ambersnail (Oxyloma kanabense)
- Lamb rams-horn (Planorbella oregonensis)
- Lance aplexa (Aplexa elongata)
- Land snail (Nesovitrea electrina)
- Longitudinal gland pyrg (Pyrgulopsis anguina)
- Lyrate mountainsnail (Oreohelix haydeni)
- Mellow column (Columella columella alticola)
- Mexican coil (Helicodiscus eigenmanni)
- Mill Creek mountainsnail (Oreohelix howardi)
- Minute gem (Hawaiia minuscula minuscula)
- Mitered vertigo (Vertigo concinnula)
- Montane snaggletooth (Gastrocopta pilsbryana)
- Mountain marshsnail (Stagnicola montanensis)
- Mud amnicola (Amnicola limosus limosus)
- New Zealand mud snail (Potamopyrgus antipodarum) - not native and considered invasive
- Ninemile pyrg (Pyrgulopsis nonaria)
- Northwest Bonneville pyrg (Pyrgulopsis variegata)
- Oregon floater (Anodonta oregonensis)
- Otter Creek pyrg (Pyrgulopsis fusca)
- Ovate vertigo (Vertigo ovata)
- Prairie fossaria (Fossaria bulimoides)
- Protean physa (Physella virgata)
  - P. v. virgata
  - P. v. berendti
  - P. v. concolor
- Pygmy fossaria (Fossaria parva)
- Quagga mussel (Dreissena bugensis) - considered an invasive species, found in Lake Powell and suspected of being in Deer Creek Reservoir
- Red-rimmed melania (Melanoides tuberculata) - not native and considered invasive
- Ribbed dagger (Pupoides hordaceus)
- Rocky Mountain duskysnail (Lyogyrus greggi)
- Rustic ambersnail (Succinea rusticana rusticana)
- Santa Rita ambersnail (Succinea grosvenori grosvenori)
- Sharp sprite (Promenetus exacuous)
- Sierra ambersnail (Catinella stretchiana)
- Slim snaggletooth (Gastrocopta pellucida parvidens)
- Sluice snaggletooth (Gastrocopta ashmuni)
- Smooth Glenwood pyrg (Pyrgulopsis chamberlini)
- Southern Bonneville pyrg (Pyrgulopsis transversa)
- Southern tightcoil (Ogaridiscus subrupicola)
- Striate disc (Discus shimekii)
- Striate gem (Hawaiia minuscula neomexicana)
- Sub-globose snake pyrg (Pyrgulopsis saxatilis)
- Swamp lymnaea (Lymnaea stagnalis appressa)
- Tapered vertigo (Vertigo elatior)
- Texas glyph (Glyphyalinia umbilicata)
- Thickshell pondsnail (Stagnicola utahensis)
- Thin-lip vallonia (Vallonia perspectiva)
- Utah physa (Physella utahensis)
- Utah roundmouth snail (Valvata utahensis)
- Variable vertigo (Vertigo gouldii)
- Western pearlshell (Margaritifera falcata)
- Wet rock physa (Physella zionis)
- White-lip dagger (Pupoides albilabris)
- Widelip pondsnail (Stagnicola traski)
- Widespread column (or Moss chrysalis snail) (Pupilla muscorum)
- Winged floater (Anodonta nuttalliana)
- Yavapai mountainsnail (Oreohelix yavapai)
