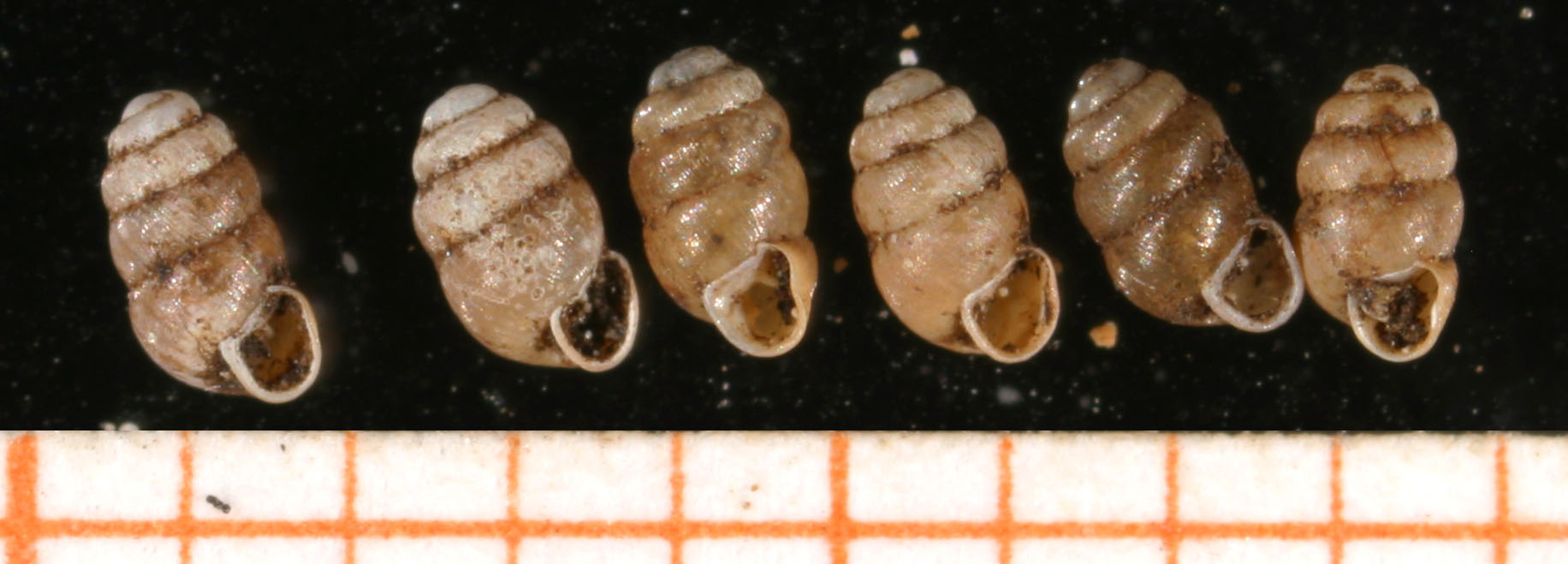
- Six shells of Vertigo alpestris. Scale bar is in mm.

Scientific classification
- Kingdom: Animalia
- Phylum: Mollusca
- Class: Gastropoda
- Order: Stylommatophora
- Family: Vertiginidae
- Subfamily: Vertigininae
- Genus: Vertigo
- Species: V. alpestris

Binomial name
- Vertigo alpestris Alder, 1838

Synonyms
- Pupa leontina Gredler, 1856 (junior synonym); Pupa shuttleworthiana L. Pfeiffer, 1847 (junior synonym); Vertigo (Glacivertigo) alpestris Alder, 1838 (unaccepted subgeneric classification); Vertigo (Vertigo) alpestris Alder, 1838 · alternate representation

= Vertigo alpestris =

Species of gastropod

Vertigo alpestris is a species of small, air-breathing land snail, terrestrial pulmonate gastropod molluscs or micromollusks in the family Vertiginidae, the whorl snails.

Subspecies

- † Vertigo alpestris tobieni Schlickum & Strauch, 1979
- Vertigo alpestris uturyotoensis Kuroda & Hukuda, 1944

== Shell description ==
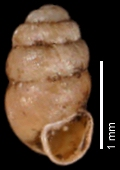
Apertural view of a shell of Vertigo alpestris

The shell is subcylindrical, thin and semitransparent, closely and rather strongly striate in the line of growth. Its color is very glossy, a pale yellowish-horn-color. The periphery is rounded: epidermis thin. The shell has 4½ convex whorls, but slightly compressed. The spire is short, abrupt and bluntly pointed. The suture is excessively deep.

The shell aperture is semioval and subangular, owing to the outward compression of the periphery. The aperture has 4 teeth: one sharp and prominent tooth on the middle of the pillar [parietal wall], one strong and also prominent and thick tooth on the pillar lip, and two lamellae or plate-like teeth which are placed at some little distance within the outer lip, but not on any rib or callous fold as in Vertigo pygmaea. The labial teeth are visible on the outside, owing to the thinness and transparency of the shell. The outer lip is rather thick and very slightly reflected, not strengthened by any rib either outside or inside. The outer edge is abruptly reflected. The inner lip is somewhat thickened in adult specimen. The umbilicus is small and narrow, but rather deep.

The width of the adult shell is 0.9-1.1 mm, the height is 1.6-2.15 mm.

== Distribution ==
This species occurs in countries and islands including:

- Bulgaria
- Czech Republic
- Poland
- Slovakia
- Ukraine
- Great Britain
- Hungary
