= V. gouldii =

V. gouldii may refer to:

- Varanus gouldii, the sand goanna, a reptile found throughout Australia
- Vertigo gouldii, the variable vertigo, an air-breathing land snail species

== See also ==
- Gouldii (disambiguation)
