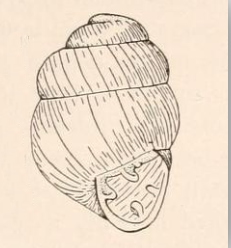
- Original drawing of a shell of Vertigo hebardi

Conservation status
- Near Threatened (IUCN 2.3)

Scientific classification
- Kingdom: Animalia
- Phylum: Mollusca
- Class: Gastropoda
- Order: Stylommatophora
- Family: Vertiginidae
- Subfamily: Vertigininae
- Genus: Vertigo
- Species: V. hebardi

Binomial name
- Vertigo hebardi Vanetta, 1912

Synonyms
- Vertigo (Vertilla) hebardi Vanatta, 1912 · alternate representation

= Vertigo hebardi =

Species of gastropod

Vertigo hebardi is a species of minute land snail, a terrestrial pulmonate gastropod mollusk or micromollusk in the family Vertiginidae, the whorl snails. This species is endemic to the United States.

== Description ==
(Original description) The umbilicate shell is rather short. It is oval; very small, fragile and corneous. The shell contains 3½ convex whorls 3. The first one is smooth, the penultimate irregularly striate. The body whorl shows a few growth striae. The aperture is semiovate and is provided with five teeth. The parietal lamella are very high and long. The angular lamella is much lower and shorter than the parietal, the columellar very strong and directed downward. The two palatals are high and short. There is no crest behind the outer lip.
