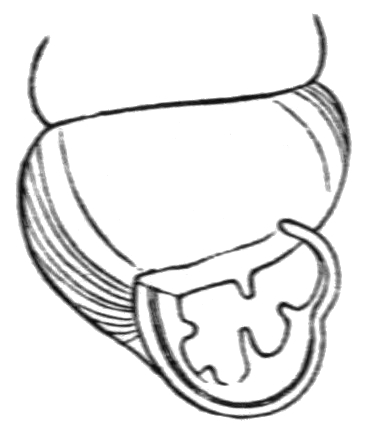
- Drawing: the aperture of a shell of Vertigo gouldii

Scientific classification
- Kingdom: Animalia
- Phylum: Mollusca
- Class: Gastropoda
- Order: Stylommatophora
- Family: Vertiginidae
- Subfamily: Vertigininae
- Genus: Vertigo
- Species: V. ventricosa

Binomial name
- Vertigo ventricosa (E. S. Morse, 1865)

Synonyms
- Isthmia ventricosa E. S. Morse, 1865; Vertigo (Alaea) ventricosa (E. S. Morse, 1865) alternate representation; Vertigo elatior Sterki, 1894; Vertigo gouldii var. lagganensis Pilsbry, 1899; Vertigo gouldii var. loessensis F. C. Baker, 1928; Vertigo ventricosa var. elatior Sterki, 1894 (junior synonym)

= Vertigo ventricosa =

Species of gastropod

Vertigo ventricosa, common name the five-tooth vertigo, is a species of small air-breathing land snail, a terrestrial pulmonate gastropod mollusk in the family Vertiginidae, the whorl snails.

== Description ==
(Original description) Animal: The dorsal and cephalic portions of the body, and tentacles are jet black. The disk is long, narrow, and rounded at extremity. The anterior portion of the disk is dark slate, becoming lighter towards the caudal extremity. The tentacles are short and very bulbous. The base of the tentacles is approximating. The cephalic lobes are conspicuous.

The buccal plate is wide, narrow, and not produced in the centre, but slightly curving at the ends. The cutting edge is regularly wavy.

Lingual formula of the radula: 98, -13, -1, -13. The central and lateral plates are notched at the outer posterior corners. The central plate is square, having three small denticles. The blate is indented at the base of the central denticle, which is the largest. The lateral plates are tridentate, the inner denticle the largest. The uncine is minutely notched.

The shell is umbilicate, ovate conic, smooth, and polished. The apex is obtuse . The suture is deep. The shell contains four convex whorls. The aperture is semi-circular, with five teeth, one prominent on the parietal margin, two smaller on the columellar margin, and two prominent within, contracting the aperture at the base. The peristome is widely reflected, the right margin is flexuose, and it is within thickened and colored.

== Distribution ==
This species occurs in Northeast America.
