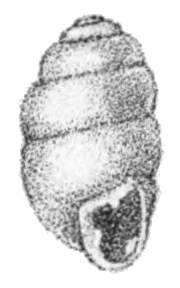
- Apertural view of a shell of Vertigo arctica

Conservation status
- Near Threatened (IUCN 3.1)

Scientific classification
- Kingdom: Animalia
- Phylum: Mollusca
- Class: Gastropoda
- Order: Stylommatophora
- Family: Vertiginidae
- Subfamily: Vertigininae
- Genus: Vertigo
- Species: V. arctica

Binomial name
- Vertigo arctica (Wallenberg, 1858)

Synonyms
- Pupa (Vertigo) eggeri Gredler, 1890 (junior synonym); Pupa arctica Wallenberg, 1858; Vertigo (Boreovertigo) arctica (Wallenberg, 1858) · alternate representation; Vertigo (Boreovertigo) modesta arctica (Wallenberg, 1858) (superseded rank); Vertigo (Vertigo) arctica (Wallenberg, 1858) (incorrect subgeneric placement); Vertigo modesta arctica (Wallenberg, 1858) (superseded rank)

= Vertigo arctica =

Species of gastropod

Vertigo arctica is a species of small air-breathing land snail, a terrestrial pulmonate gastropod mollusk in the family Vertiginidae, the whorl snails.

== Distribution ==
This species occurs in:

- Poland - critically endangered

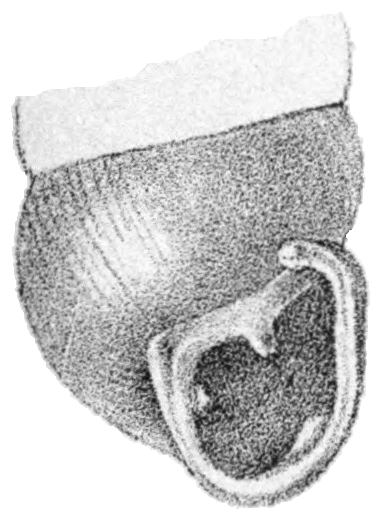
Drawing of aperture of Vertigo arctica

== Shell description ==
Shell is dextral, rimate, ovate, thin, smoothish, somewhat glossy, pellucid, brownish-tawny. The shell has 5 to 5 ½ whorls, convex, the last nearly two-fifths the altitude, rounded at base, anteriorly having a somewhat swollen crest.

Aperture is slightly oblique, semiovate or piriform, obstructed by 3 teeth: in the middle of the parietal wall, on the columella, and a smaller one in the palate (frequently wanting). Peristome is spreading, slightly labiate, the margins joined by a callus, the right margin very strongly curved above, columellar margin is somewhat dilated, spreading.

The width of the adult shell is about 2.5 mm, the height about 1.5 mm.
