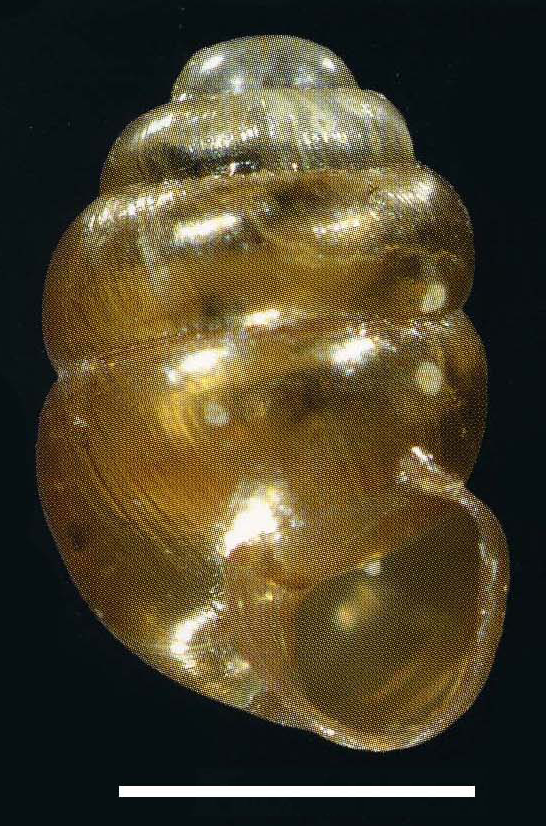
- Apertural view of the shell of the holotype of Vertigo ultimathule

Conservation status
- Near Threatened (IUCN 3.1)

Scientific classification
- Kingdom: Animalia
- Phylum: Mollusca
- Class: Gastropoda
- Order: Stylommatophora
- Family: Vertiginidae
- Subfamily: Vertigininae
- Genus: Vertigo
- Species: V. ultimathule

Binomial name
- Vertigo ultimathule von Proschwitz, 2007

Synonyms
- Vertigo (Boreovertigo) ultimathule von Proschwitz, 2007 alternate representation

= Vertigo ultimathule =

Species of gastropod

Vertigo ultimathule is a species of small, air-breathing land snail, terrestrial pulmonate gastropod molluscs or micromollusks in the family Vertiginidae, the whorl snails.

== Distribution ==
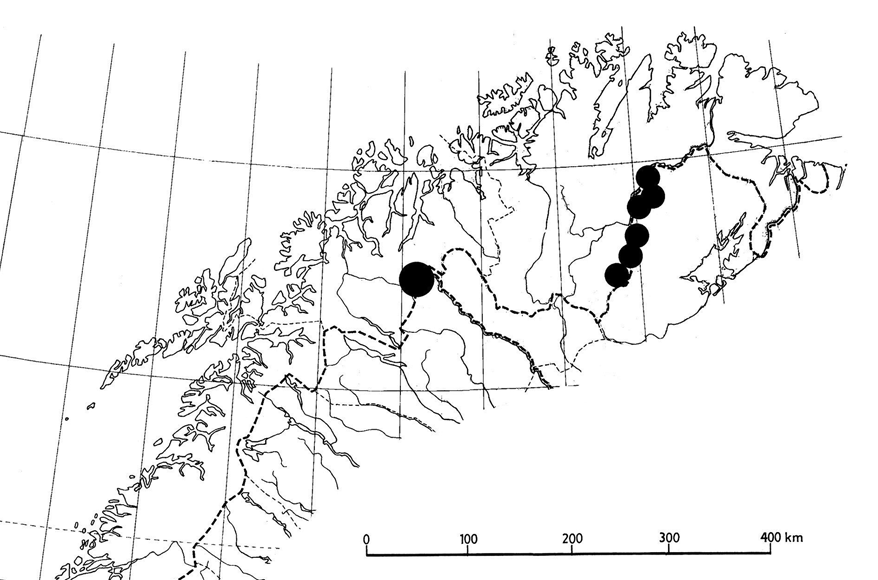
Distribution of V. ultimathule. The large dot marks the type locality in Sweden.

Vertigo ultimathule is found in:

- Finnmark County in the river valleys of the River Tana and its tributary Anarjohka, Norway
- Pältsan, the very northernmost part of Sweden,

The type locality is Pältsan-area, in the northernmost corner of Swedish Lapland.

Occurrences are to be expected in other parts of Finnmark and adjacent parts of Finland and Sweden. It appears that Vertigo ultimathule is rare with a very limited distribution endemic to northernmost Norway and Sweden.

== Description ==
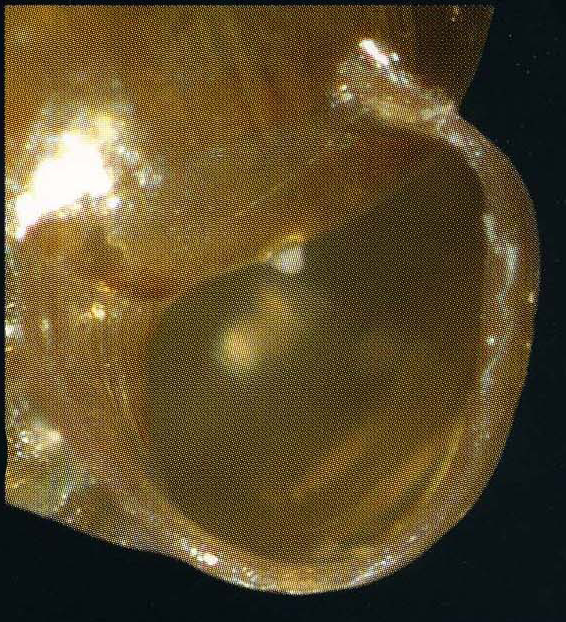
Aperture.

Vertigo ultimathule is a medium-sized Vertigo, which reaches a height of 2.1–2.2 mm and a diameter of 1.3–1.4 mm, the number of whorls is 4.6–4.7. The shell is almost cylindrical, with marked convex whorls, which are separated by a marked, deep suture. The shape is not distinctly ovoid, as in some other Vertigo-species, and the last whorl does not narrow markedly at the base. In side view from left the outer margin of the last whorl forms a blunt angle close to the umbilicus. The aperture is completely toothless or with only a small, delicate, rather deeply set parietal denticle. The mouth-edge is simple and scarcely thickened. The colour of the shell is light yellow – dark yellow-brown. The surface is glossy, with marked, but irregular, rather coarse striation.

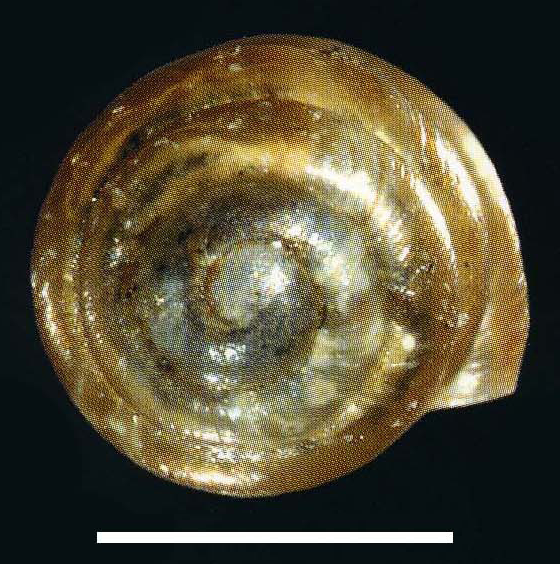
Apical view.

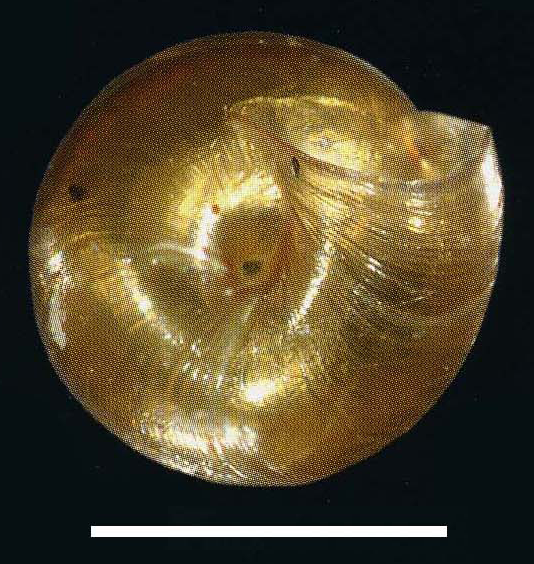
Umbilical view.

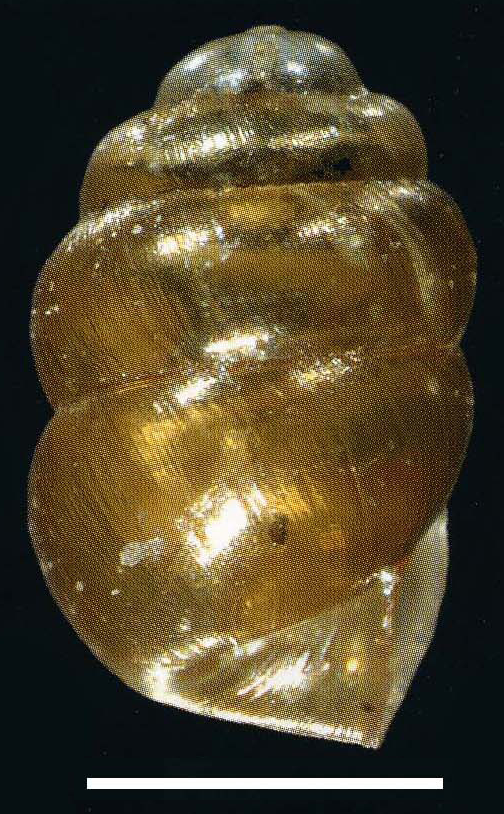
Lateral view.

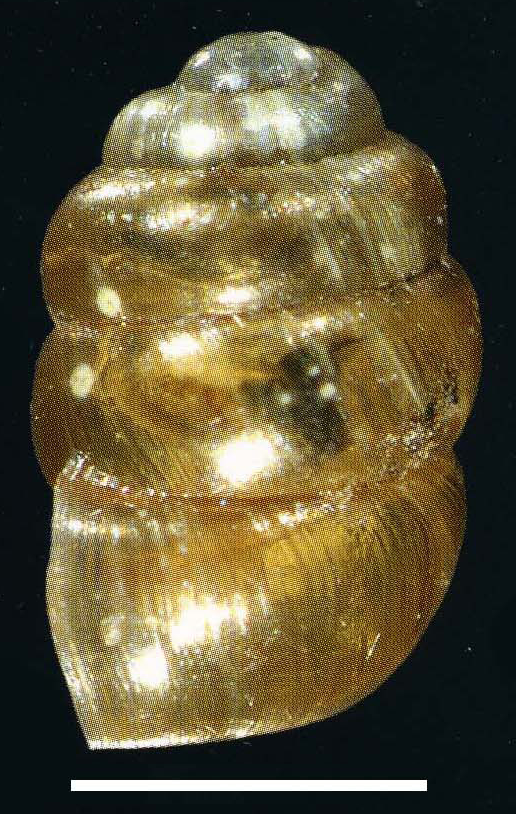
Lateral view.

== Ecology ==
The localities of Vertigo ultimathule are brook valleys or mountain slopes with mountain birch and often Salix shrubs. The pH of the ground litter was measured in two of the localities, the values obtained were 6.75 and 6.0. The Norwegian localities are situated at 180–200 m (590–660 ft) altitude; the Swedish somewhat higher, at 520–620 m (1,710–2,030 ft) altitude.
