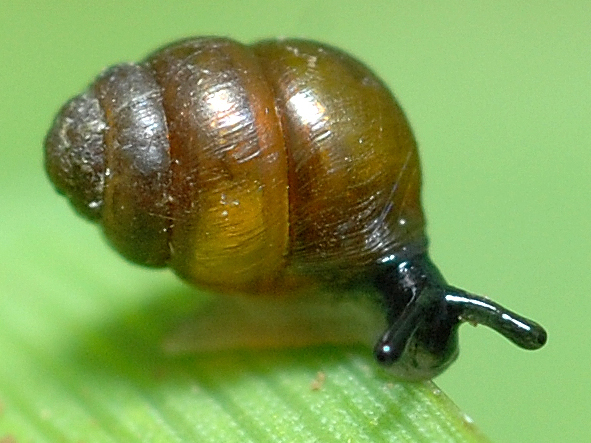
- A live individual of Vertigo moulinsiana

Scientific classification
- Kingdom: Animalia
- Phylum: Mollusca
- Class: Gastropoda
- Order: Stylommatophora
- Family: Vertiginidae
- Subfamily: Vertigininae
- Genus: Vertigo; O. F. Müller, 1773

Synonyms
- List: Afripupa Pilsbry & C. M. Cooke, 1920 (junior subjective synonym); Alaea Jeffreys, 1830; †Angustella Steklov, 1967; Dexiogyra Stabile, 1864; Glacivertigo Balashov, 2016; Haplopupa Pilsbry, 1898; Helix (Isthmia) Gray, 1821; Isthmia Gray, 1821; Nearctula Sterki, 1892 (junior synonym); Nesopupa (Afripupa) Pilsbry & C. M. Cooke, 1920 junior subjective synonym; Pupa (Alaea) Jeffreys, 1830 · unaccepted (original name); Pupa (Isthmia) Gray, 1821; Pupa (Nearctula) Sterki, 1892; Pupa (Staurodon) Lowe, 1852 (original name); Pupa (Sterkia) Pilsbry, 1898 (original rank); Pupa (Vertigo) O.F. Müller, 1773; Staurodon R. T. Lowe, 1852 (junior synonym); Staurodon (Afripupa) Pilsbry & C. M. Cooke, 1920 (junior subjective synonym); Sterkia Pilsbry, 1898; Sterkia (Metasterkia) Pilsbry, 1920(junior synonym); Sterkia (Sterkia) Pilsbry, 1898 (junior synonym); †Ungulidenta Popova & Schileyko, 1981; Vertigo (Alaea) Jeffreys, 1830; Vertigo (Alloptyx) Pilsbry, 1953; † Vertigo (Angustella) Steklov, 1967 junior subjective synonym; Vertigo (Angustula) Sterki, 1888; Vertigo (Boreovertigo) Nekola, Chiba, Coles, Drost, Proschwitz & Horsák, 2018; Vertigo (Dexiogyra) Stabile, 1864 junior subjective synonym; Vertigo (Glacivertigo) Balashov, 2016; Vertigo (Isthmia) Gray, 1821; Vertigo (Nearctula) Sterki, 1892; †Vertigo (Ptychalaea) O. Boettger, 1889; Vertigo (Staurodon) R. T. Lowe, 1852 alternate representation; † Vertigo (Ungulidenta) Popova & Schileyko, 1981 junior subjective synonym; Vertigo (Vertigo) O. F. Müller, 1773; Vertigo (Vertilla) Moquin-Tandon, 1856; Vertigo (Vertillaria) Pilsbry, 1919

= Vertigo (gastropod) =

Genus of gastropods

Vertigo is a genus of minute, air-breathing land snails, terrestrial pulmonate gastropod molluscs or micromollusks in the family Vertiginidae, the whorl snails.

== Description ==
Snails in the genus Vertigo have no oral tentacles, thus they have only one pair of tentacles.

The jaw is arched; the ends squarely truncated; the anterior surface striate; the cutting edge with a median projection. The radula has a central tooth that is almost square, tricuspid, as large as or larger than the lateral teeth, which are similar, narrower, and bi- or tricuspid. The marginal teeth are low, wide and serrated.

=== Shell ===
The shell is deeply rimate and ovate. The apex is acuminate and obtuse. The shell has 5–6 whorls. The last whorl is rounded. The aperture is semioval with 4 to 7 folds. The peristome is scarcely expanded and white-lipped.

== Distribution ==
The distribution of the genus Vertigo includes Europe, northern Asia, eastern Asia, Japan, Central and North America, Caribbean and the Bermudas.

== Species ==
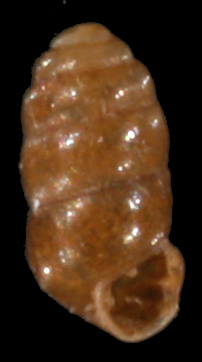
Apertural view of a shell of Vertigo pygmaea

Species in the genus Vertigo include:

- Vertigo alabamensis G. Clapp, 1915 – Alabama Vertigo
- Vertigo alpestris Alder, 1838 – tundra vertigo
- † Vertigo angulifera O. Boettger, 1884
- Vertigo angustior Jeffreys, 1830 – Narrow-mouthed Whorl Snail
- †Vertigo antipygmaea Harzhauser & Neubauer, 2018
- Vertigo antivertigo (Draparnaud, 1801)
- Vertigo arctica (Wallenberg, 1858)
- † Vertigo arenula (C. A. White, 1876)
- Vertigo arizonensis Pilsbry & Vanatta, 1900
- Vertigo arthuri Von Martens, 1882
- †Vertigo atavuncula (C. A. White, 1883)
- † Vertigo bakonyensis Kókay, 2006
- Vertigo bandulana (Connolly, 1922)
- † Vertigo bella Y.-T. Li, 1986
- Vertigo beringia Nekola, Chiba, Coles, Drost, Proschwitz & Horsák, 2018
- Vertigo bermudensis Pilsbry, 1919
- Vertigo berryi Pilsbry, 1919
- † Vertigo bicolumellata Steklov in Steklov & Tsytovich, 1967
- † Vertigo bifida (Deshayes, 1863)
- Vertigo binneyana Sterki, 1890
- Vertigo bisulcata (Jickeli, 1873)
- Vertigo bollesiana (Morse, 1865) – Delicate vertigo snail
- † Vertigo brusinai De Stefani, 1880
- Vertigo calamitosa (Pilsbry, 1889)
- Vertigo californica (Rowell, 1862)
- † Vertigo callosa Reuss in Reuss & Meyer, 1849
- Vertigo catalinaria (Sterki, 1890)
- Vertigo chiricahuensis Nekola, Chiba, Coles, Drost, Proschwitz & Horsák, 2018
- Vertigo chytryi Nekola, Chiba, Coles, Drost, Proschwitz & Horsák, 2018
- † Vertigo cianfanellianus (Manganelli, Benocci, Esu & Fo. Giusti, 2008)
- Vertigo circumlabiata Schileyko, 1984
- Vertigo clappi Brooks & G. R. Hunt, 1936
- Vertigo clementina (Sterki, 1890)
- Vertigo coloradensis (Cockerell, 1891)
- Vertigo columbiana Sterki, 1892
- Vertigo congoensis (Dartevelle, 1952)
- † Vertigo consteniusi Pierce in Pierce & Constenius, 2001
- Vertigo conecuhensis G. Clapp, 1915: synonym of Vertigo alabamensis G. H. Clapp, 1915
- Vertigo cristata (Sterki, 1919)
- Vertigo cupressicola Sterki, 1919
- Vertigo dalliana (Sterki, 1890)
- Vertigo dedecora (Pilsbry, 1902)
- † Vertigo defranceii (Brongniart, 1810)
- Vertigo diegoensis (Sterki, 1890)
- † Vertigo diversidens (Sandberger, 1872)
- † Vertigo doliara Pierce in Pierce & Constenius, 2001
- † Vertigo douvillei de Morgan, 1920
- † Vertigo elsheimensis O. Boettger, 1889
- Vertigo eogea Pilsbry, 1919
  - Vertigo eogea stagnalis Kuroda, 1941
- Vertigo extima (Westerlund, 1877)
- Vertigo farquhari (Pilsbry, 1917)
- Vertigo genesii (Gredler, 1856) – Round-mouthed Whorl Snail
- Vertigo genesioides Nekola, Chiba, Coles, Drost, Proschwitz & Horsák, 2018
- Vertigo geyeri Lindholm, 1925
- Vertigo gittenbergeri (Hausdorf, 2008)
- † Vertigo globosa Sacco, 1886
- Vertigo gouldii (Binney, 1843)
- Vertigo griqualandica (Melvill & Ponsonby, 1893)
- Vertigo hannai Pilsbry, 1919
- † Vertigo hauchecornei Klebs, 1886
- Vertigo hebardi Vanetta, 1912
- Vertigo hemphilli (Sterki, 1890)
- † Vertigo hibbardi F. C. Baker, 1938
- Vertigo hinkleyi Pilsbry, 1921
- Vertigo hirasei Pilsbry, 1901
- † Vertigo hohenstaufenorum Schlickum & Geissert, 1980
- Vertigo hydrophila (Reinhardt, 1877)
- Vertigo idahoensis Pilsbry, 1934
- Vertigo inserta Pilsbry, 1919
- Vertigo japonica Pilsbry & Y. Hirase, 1904
- † Vertigo kochi O. Boettger, 1889
- Vertigo kodamai Nekola, Chiba, Coles, Drost, Proschwitz & Horsák, 2018
- † Vertigo kroloppi Schlickum & Strauch, 1979
- † Vertigo kuenowii Klebs, 1886
- Vertigo kurilensis Nekola, Chiba, Coles, Drost, Proschwitz & Horsák, 2018
- Vertigo kushiroensis Pilsbry & Y. Hirase, 1905
  - Vertigo kushiroensis botanicorum Horsak & Pokryszko, 2010
- † Vertigo likharevi Prysjazhnjuk, 1978
- Vertigo lilljeborgi (Westerlund, 1871)
- † Vertigo lozeki Schlickum & Puisségur, 1978
- † Vertigo luminosa Y.-T. Li, 1986
- Vertigo malleata Coles & Nekola, 2007
- † Vertigo manchurica K. Suzuki, 194
- Vertigo marciae Nekola & Rosenberg, 2013
- Vertigo marki Gulick, 1904
- † Vertigo maxillosa Schütt, 1994
- Vertigo meramecensis A. S. Van Devender, 1979
- † Vertigo micra Pierce in Pierce & Constenius, 2001
- Vertigo microsphaera Schileyko, 1984
- Vertigo milium (Gould, 1840) – Blade Vertigo
- † Vertigo milleri Gottschick & Wenz, 1919
- † Vertigo minor O. Boettger, 1870
- Vertigo modesta (Say, 1824) – cross vertigo
- †Vertigo moedlingensis Wenz & Edlauer, 1942
- † Vertigo moenana Zinndorf, 1901
- † Vertigo moldavica Prisyazhnyuk, 1973
- Vertigo morsei Sterki, 1894
- † Vertigo mostrata Y.-T. Li, 1986
- Vertigo moulinsiana (Dupuy, 1849) – Desmoulin's whorl snail
- † Vertigo myrmido Michaud, 1855
- Vertigo nangaparbatensis Pokryszko & Hlaváč, 2009
- Vertigo nitidula (Mousson, 1876)
- † Vertigo nouleti Michaud, 1862
- Vertigo numellata Gulick, 1904
- Vertigo nylanderi Sterki, 1909
- † Vertigo obesa Y.-T. Li, 1986
- Vertigo occidentalis Sterki, 1907
- † Vertigo ocsensis (Halaváts, 1903)
- Vertigo okinoerabuensis Pilsbry & Hirase, 1904
- † Vertigo olchonica Popova & Schileyko, 1981
- Vertigo oralis Sterki, 1890 – Palmetto Vertigo
- Vertigo oscariana Sterki, 1890 – Capital Vertigo
- Vertigo oughtoni Pilsbry, 1948
- Vertigo ovata (Say, 1822) – ovate vertigo
- † Vertigo ovatula (Sandberger, 1875)
- † Vertigo pageti Schlickum & Strauch, 1979
- † Vertigo palangula (De Boissy, 1848)
- † Vertigo pandei Bhatia & Mathur, 1971
- Vertigo parcedentata (A. Braun, 1847)
- Vertigo parvula Sterki, 1890
- Vertigo perryi Sterki, 1905
- Vertigo pimuensis Nekola, Chiba, Coles, Drost, Proschwitz & Horsák, 2018
- Vertigo pisewensis Nekola, Chiba, Coles, Drost, Proschwitz & Horsák, 2018
- † Vertigo pontileviensis de Morgan, 1920
- † Vertigo praecoquis Russell, 1956
- † Vertigo praepusilla Prysjazhnjuk, 1978
- † Vertigo protracta (Sandberger, 1875)
- † Vertigo pseudoantivertigo Paladilhe, 1873
- Vertigo pseudosubstriata Ložek, 1954
- Vertigo pusilla O. F. Müller, 1774 – type species
- Vertigo pygmaea (Draparnaud, 1801) – crested vertigo
- Vertigo ronnebyensis (Westerlund, 1871)
- Vertigo rowellii (Newcomb, 1860)
- Vertigo rugosula Sterki, 1890 – Striate Vertigo
- Vertigo sandbergeri Wenz, 1923 †
- Vertigo seminulum (R. T. Lowe, 1852)
- Vertigo sterkii Pilsbry, 1919
- Vertigo substriata (Jeffreys, 1833)
- Vertigo superstriata Pokryszko & Auffenberg, 2009
- † Vertigo tembrockae Schlickum & Strauch, 1979
- Vertigo teskeyae Hubricht, 1961
- † Vertigo tewarii Bhatia & Mathur, 1971
- Vertigo torrei Aguayo & Jaume, 1934
- Vertigo tridentata Wolf, 1870
- Vertigo trinotata (Sterki, 1890)
- † Vertigo trolli Wenz in K. Fischer & Wenz, 1914
- † Vertigo tuchoricensis Pilsbry in Pilsbry & C. M. Cooke, 1919
- † Vertigo turonica de Morgan, 1920
- Vertigo ultima Pilsbry, 1919
- Vertigo ultimathule Proschwitz, 2007
- † Vertigo uncata Steklov, 1967
- Vertigo utahensis Sterki, 1892
- † Vertigo vectiensis L. R. Cox, 1924
- Vertigo ventricosa (E. S. Morse, 1865)
- † Vertigo vracevicensis Neubauer & Harzhauser in Neubauer et al., 2017
- † Vertigo whitei Pierce in Pierce & Rasmussen, 1992

Synonyms

- Vertigo concinnula (Roscoe and Roscoe, 1955) – Mitered vertigo: synonym of Vertigo modesta concinnula Cockerell, 1897
- Vertigo cubana Crosse, 1890: synonym of Lyropupa cubana (Dall, 1890)
- Vertigo elatior (Brooks, 1936) – tapered vertigo: synonym of Vertigo ventricosa (Morse, 1865)
- † Vertigo flexidens (Reuss, 1861): synonym of † Ptychalaea flexidens (Reuss, 1861)
- Vertigo hachijoensis Pilsbry, 1919: synonym of Vertigo kushiroensis hachijoensis Pilsbry, 1919
- Vertigo heldi Clessin, 1877: synonym of Vertigo pygmaea (Draparnaud, 1801)
- Vertigo hubrichti Pilsbry, 1934: synonym of Vertigo arthuri E. von Martens, 1882
- † Vertigo interferens (Deshayes, 1863) : synonym of † Ovicarychium interferens (Deshayes, 1863)
- † Vertigo mystica (Stworzewicz & Pokryszko, 2015): synonym of † Ptychalaea mystica Stworzewicz & B.M. Pokryszko, 2015
- Vertigo neglecta Arango in Poey, 1856: synonym of Vertigo ovata Say, 1822
- Vertigo occulta Vanetta, 1912: synonym of Vertigo arthuri E. von Martens, 1882
- †Vertigo paradoxa Sterki in Pilsbry, 1900: synonym of Vertigo arthuri E. von Martens, 1882
- Vertigo shimochii Kuroda & Amano, 1960: synonym of Gastrocopta servilis (A. Gould, 1843)
- Vertigo sieversi (O. Boettger, 1879): synonym of Vertigo nitidula (Mousson, 1876)
