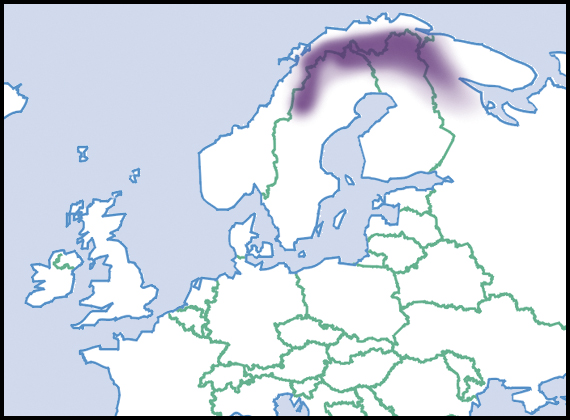
- Range map of Vertigo extima

Scientific classification
- Kingdom: Animalia
- Phylum: Mollusca
- Class: Gastropoda
- Order: Stylommatophora
- Family: Vertiginidae
- Subfamily: Vertigininae
- Genus: Vertigo
- Species: V. extima

Binomial name
- Vertigo extima (Westerlund, 1877)

Synonyms
- Pupa (Vertigo) arctica var. extima Westerlund, 1877; Pupa arctica var. extima Westerlund, 1876 (original combination); Vertigo (Boreovertigo) extima (Westerlund, 1876) alternate representation; Vertigo (Glacivertigo) extima (Westerlund, 1876)

= Vertigo extima =

Species of gastropod

Vertigo extima is a species of small air-breathing land snail, a terrestrial pulmonate gastropod mollusc or micromollusc in the family Vertiginidae, the whorl snails. Its habitat is a denizen of various willow-dominated wetlands in a tundra and northern taiga matrix.

== Description ==
The length of the shell attains 3 mm, its diameter 1.75 mm. This species mode of locomotion is mucus meditated gliding.

== Distribution ==
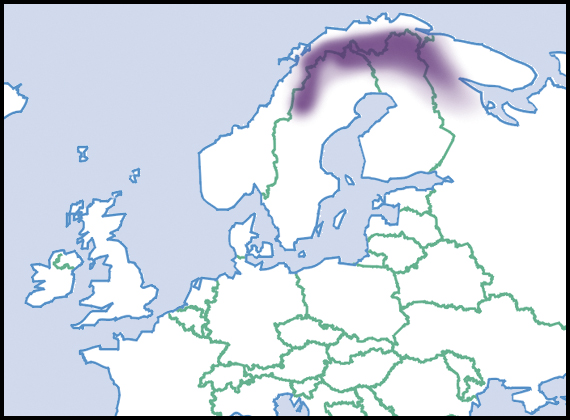
Distribution

Vertigo extima is usually found in northern Scandinavia, northern Siberia, Northern Labrador, central quebec and in western Alaska. Its distribution covers an area from 5000 to 20,000 square kilometers (about 2000 to 8000 square miles).
