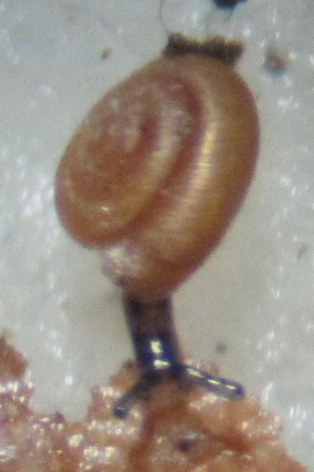
- Punctum minutissimum

Scientific classification
- Kingdom: Animalia
- Phylum: Mollusca
- Class: Gastropoda
- Superorder: Eupulmonata
- Order: Stylommatophora
- Family: Punctidae
- Genus: Punctum; Morse, 1864

Type species
- Helix minutissima I. Lea, 1841

Synonyms
- Patula (Patulastra) L. Pfeiffer, 1879 (junior synonym); Patulastra L. Pfeiffer, 1879; Punctum (Pseudopunctum) J. P. E. Morrison, 1935· accepted, alternate representation; Punctum (Punctum) Morse, 1864· accepted, alternate representation

= Punctum (gastropod) =

Genus of gastropods

Punctum is a genus of very small air-breathing land snails, terrestrial pulmonate gastropod mollusks or micromollusks in the subfamily Punctinae of the family Punctidae, the dot snails.

== Distribution ==
This genus is found throughout the Holarctic ecozone, and also in South Africa and Mexico.

== Species ==
The genus Punctum includes the following species:

The type species is Helix minutissima Lea, 1841

- Punctum abbadianum (Bourguignat, 1883)
- Punctum adami Bruggen & Goethem, 2001
- † Punctum alveus Pierce, 1992
- Punctum amblygonum (Reinhardt, 1877)
- Punctum apertum Pilsbry & Y. Hirase, 1904
- Punctum atomus Pilsbry & Hirase, 1904
- Punctum azoricum De Winter, 1988
- Punctum blandianum Pilsbry, 1900
- Punctum boreale Pilsbry & Y. Hirase, 1905
- Punctum bristoli (Gulick,1904)
- Punctum brucei (Jickeli, 1874)
- Punctum californicum Pilsbry, 1898
- Punctum camerunense de Winter, 2017
- Punctum depressum Odhner, 1922
- Punctum elachistum Pilsbry & Y. Hirase, 1904
- Punctum hainanensis (Möllendorff, 1887)
- Punctum hannai B. Roth, 1985
- Punctum horneri Ancey, 1904
- Punctum infans Pilsbry & Y. Hirase, 1904
- Punctum japonicum Pilsbry, 1900
- Punctum kilimanjaricum Verdcourt, 1978
- Punctum lepta (Westerlund, 1883)
- Punctum lozeki Horsák & Meng, 2018
- Punctum micropleuros (Paget, 1854)
- Punctum minutissimum I. Lea, 1841 – but Helix minutissima may be considered as a synonym of Punctum pygmaeum
- Punctum mokotoense Abdou & Bouchet, 2000
- Punctum morseanum Pilsbry, 1902
- Punctum nimbaense de Winter, 2017
- † Punctum oligocaenicum Zinndorf, 1901
- Punctum orphana (Heude, 1882)
- Punctum pallidum Connolly, 1922
- † Punctum parvulum Gottschick, 1920
- † Punctum parvulum A. B. Leonard, 1972 (unreplaced junior homonym; junior homonym of † Punctum parvulum Gottschick, 1920; no replacement name is available))
- † Punctum patagonicum Miquel & P. E. Rodriguez, 2016
- Punctum petiti Fischer-Piette & Vukadinovic, 1971
- Punctum polynesicum Solem, 1983
- † Punctum propygmaeum Andreae, 1904
- † Punctum pumilio Jooss, 1918
- Punctum pygmaeum (Draparnaud, 1801) – type species
- Punctum randolphi Dall, 1895
- Punctum rota Pilsbry & Hirase, 1904
- Punctum seychellarum Gerlach, 1998
- Punctum smithi Morrison, 1935
- Punctum taiwanicum Pilsbry & Hirase, 1905
- Punctum ugandanum (E. A. Smith, 1903)
- Punctum ussuriense Likharev & Rammelmeyer, 1952
- Punctum vitreum H. B. Baker, 1930

Synonyms

- Punctum (Toltecia) Pilsbry, 1926: synonym of Paralaoma Iredale, 1913
- Punctum abyssinicum (Jickeli, 1874): synonym of Trachycystis abyssinica (Jickeli, 1874)
- Punctum clappi Pilsbry, 1898: synonym of Planogyra clappi (Pilsbry, 1898) (original combination)
- Punctum conicum Odhner, 1922: synonym of Sinployea conica (Odhner, 1922) (original combination)
- Punctum conspectum (Bland, 1865): synonym of Paralaoma servilis (Shuttleworth, 1852) (junior synonym)
- Punctum cryophilum (E. von Martens, 1865): synonym of Toltecia pusilla (Lowe, 1831): synonym of Paralaoma servilis (Shuttleworth, 1852)
- Punctum homalospira (Morelet, 1883): synonym of Psichion homalospira (Morelet, 1883) (superseded combination)
- Punctum hottentotum (Melvill & Ponsonby, 1891): synonym of Paralaoma hottentota (Melvill & Ponsonby, 1891) (superseded combination)
- Punctum lederi (O. Boettger, 1880): synonym of Paralaoma servilis (Shuttleworth, 1852) (invalid combination)
- † Punctum victoris (Michaud, 1862): synonym of † Lucilla victoris (Michaud, 1862)
