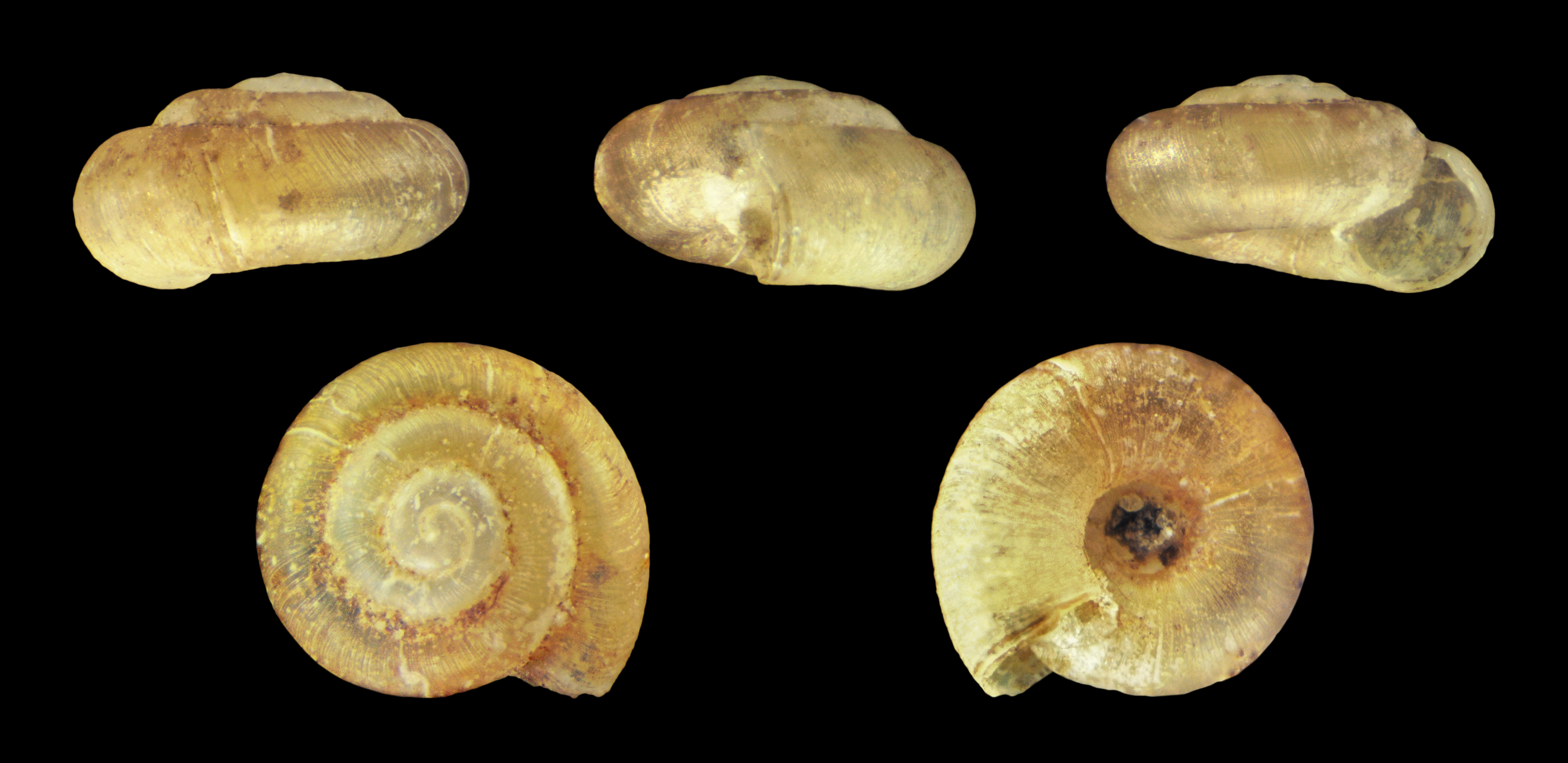
- Five views of a shell of Punctum pygmaeum

Conservation status
- Secure (NatureServe)

Scientific classification
- Kingdom: Animalia
- Phylum: Mollusca
- Class: Gastropoda
- Order: Stylommatophora
- Family: Punctidae
- Genus: Punctum
- Species: P. pygmaeum

Binomial name
- Punctum pygmaeum (Draparnaud, 1801)

Synonyms
- Helix pygmæa Draparnaud, 1801

= Punctum pygmaeum =

Species of gastropod

Punctum pygmaeum is a species of very small, air-breathing land snail, a terrestrial pulmonate gastropod mollusk in the family Punctidae, the dot snails.

== Shell description ==
For terms see gastropod shell. The shell is very small, 1.2-1.6 mm in width.

The 0.6-0.8 x 1.2-1.6 mm shell is almost flat, extremely densely and regularly striated, appearing silky shiny light horny brown. There are 3-3.5 moderately convex whorls, the aperture is rounded, with a thin margin which is not reflected and without a lip. The umbilicus is wide (25% of shell diameter).

== Habitat ==
These gastropods are commonly found in damp, dim, and undisturbed areas including the margins or wetlands, wet woodland, and leaf-littered forests. They may also live in mossy suburban gardens. They commonly lay their eggs underneath damp soil or rocks.

== Distribution ==
This species occurs in countries and islands including:

- Czech Republic
- Great Britain
- Ireland
- Slovakia
- Sweden, Norway, Denmark and Finland
- Poland
- Ukraine
- Netherlands
- Latvia
- Bulgaria
- United States
- and other areas
