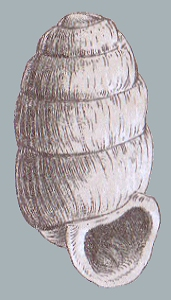
- Drawing: apertural view of a shell of Vertigo parcedentata

Conservation status
- Vulnerable (IUCN 3.1)

Scientific classification
- Kingdom: Animalia
- Phylum: Mollusca
- Class: Gastropoda
- Order: Stylommatophora
- Family: Vertiginidae
- Subfamily: Vertigininae
- Genus: Vertigo
- Species: V. parcedentata

Binomial name
- Vertigo parcedentata (Braun, 1847)

Synonyms
- Pupa parcedentata Braun, 1847; Vertigo (Boreovertigo) parcedentata (A. Braun, 1847) · alternate representation; Vertigo (Glacivertigo) parcedentata (A. Braun, 1847) (unaccepted subgeneric classification)

= Vertigo parcedentata =

Species of gastropod

Vertigo parcedentata is a species of small, air-breathing land snail, terrestrial pulmonate gastropod molluscs or micromollusks in the family Vertiginidae, the whorl snails.

== Distribution ==
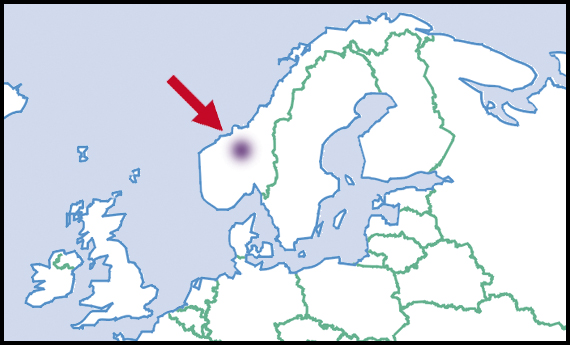
Distribution

Vertigo parcedentata was first described as a fossil from the loess of Wiesbaden, Germany. The fossil distribution also includes other parts of Europe, from the Netherlands to Ukraine: Pleistocene and alluvium of the Rhine valley in Germany, Czech Republic, Slovakia, etc. Preece, White & Shchetnikov (2007) had the first Holocene findings from the Baikal region.

Until recently, this species was believed to be extinct. Quite surprisingly, it was found alive in the Dovrefjell, Norway. Meng (2008) found evidence of the occurrence of Vertigo parcedentata in the Altay Mountains and Tien Shan. In 2009 the material was photographed for the first time and compared with fossil material from Central Germany. Pokryszko & Horsák (2007) also found evidence of the recent occurrence of this species in the Altay region.

The Recent distribution of this species includes:

- Dovrefjell, Norway
- Altay Mountains in Russia
- Tien Shan in Kyrgyzstan

== Description ==
The shell is small, narrowly ovate. The shell has a narrow umbilical crevice and blunt summit. The shell has from 4 1/2 to 5 convex whorls separated by a deeply impressed suture. The last whorl is forming half of the total length. The first whorl is entirely smooth, the rest having rather oblique striae, of which there are several finer between two stronger striae.

The aperture is semiovate, obliquely truncate above, with weakly reflected margins that are connected by a very thin callus. The right margin is weakly arched forward. It has usually one or two teeth or is wholly toothless, but it can have up to 4 teeth.

Authorities differ over the dimensions of the shell:

- The width of the adult shell is 1 mm, the height is 1.8–2.2 mm (Pilsbry 1918–1920).
- The width of the adult shell is 1.15–1.2 mm, the height is 2–2.2 mm (Ložek 1964).
- The width of the adult shell is 1.15–1.25 mm, the height is 1.7–2.3 mm (AnimalBase 2009).

== Ecology ==
Vertigo parcedentata inhabits soligenous and mixed calcareous fens.
