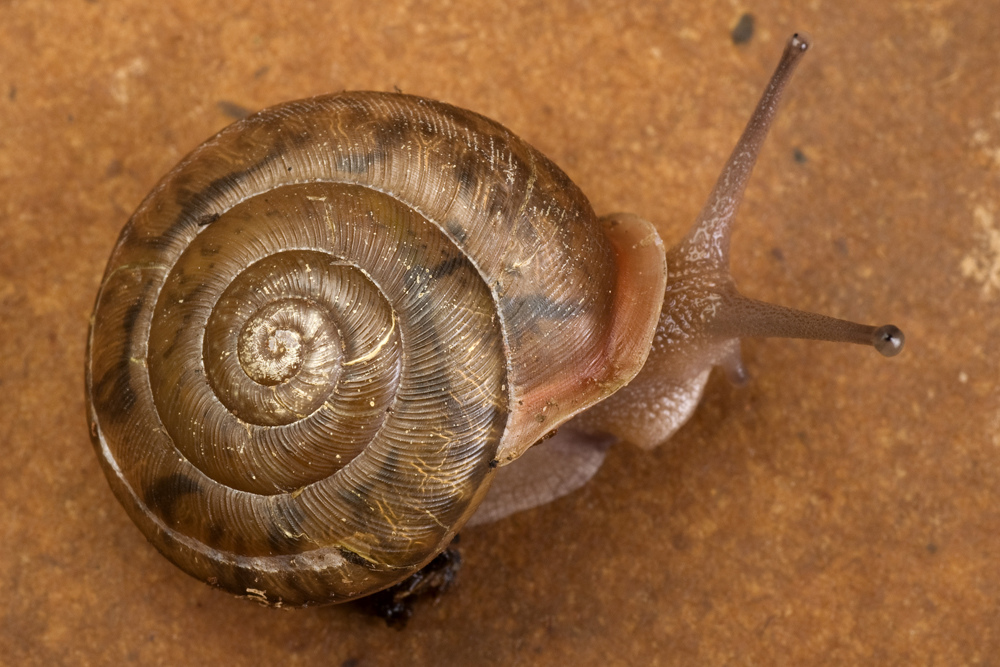
- A live individual of Neohelix dentifera

Scientific classification
- Kingdom: Animalia
- Phylum: Mollusca
- Class: Gastropoda
- Order: Stylommatophora
- Family: Polygyridae
- Tribe: Triodopisini
- Genus: Neohelix; H. von Ihering, 1892

= Neohelix =

Genus of gastropods

Neohelix is a genus (or a subgenus under Triodopsis) of air-breathing land snails, terrestrial pulmonate gastropod molluscs in the family Polygyridae.

The shells of Neohelix are not distinguishable from those of the genus Mesodon, but the reproductive anatomy of the two groups of snails is different.

== Species ==
Species within the genus Neohelix include:

- Neohelix albolabris
- Neohelix alleni
- Neohelix dentifera
- Neohelix divesta
- Neohelix major
- Neohelix solemi
