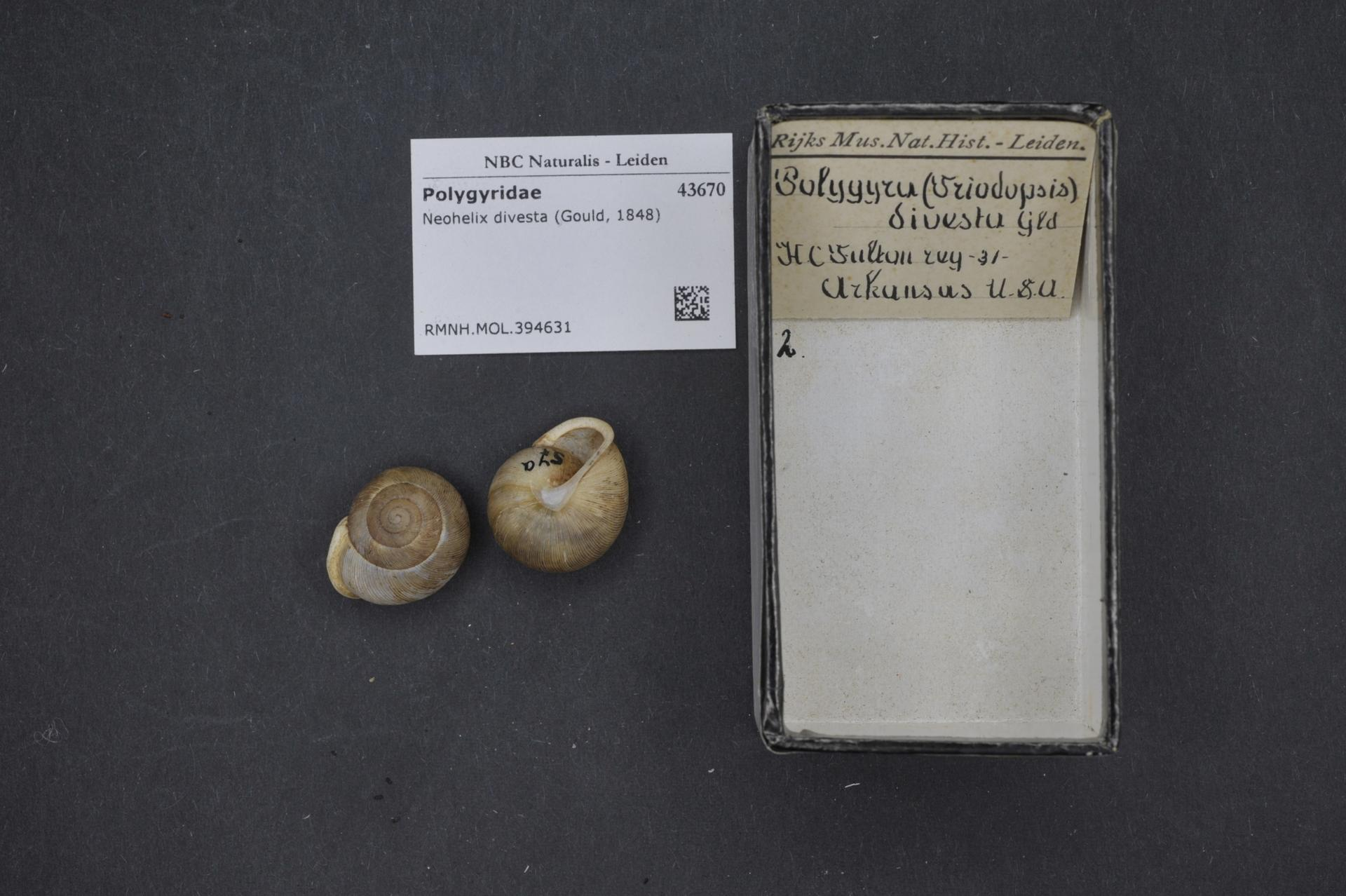

Conservation status
- Vulnerable (NatureServe)

Scientific classification
- Kingdom: Animalia
- Phylum: Mollusca
- Class: Gastropoda
- Order: Stylommatophora
- Family: Polygyridae
- Genus: Neohelix
- Species: N. divesta

Binomial name
- Neohelix divesta (A. Gould, 1851)

= Neohelix divesta =

Species of gastropod

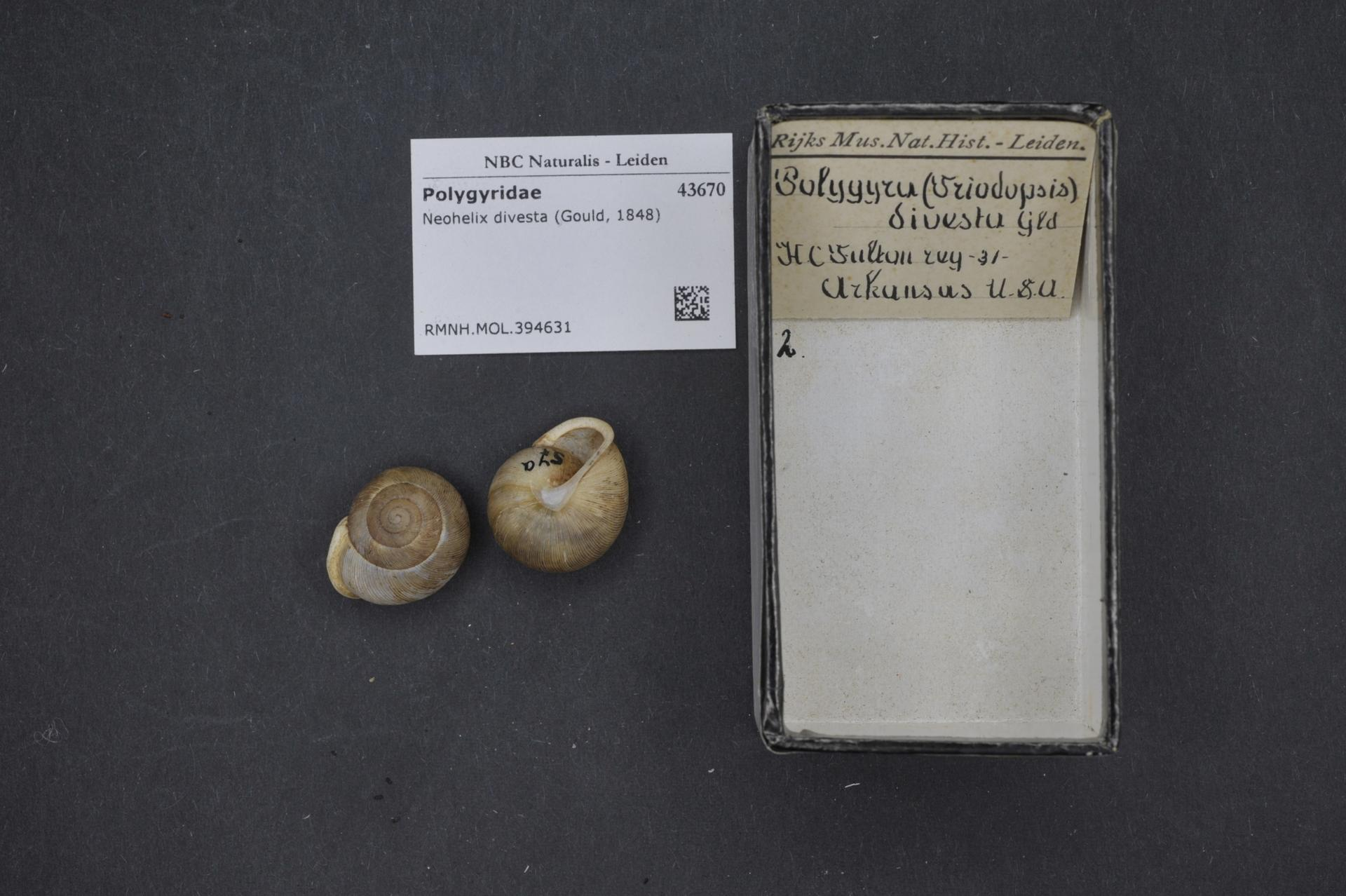
Preserved neohelix divesta shell

Neohelix divesta is a species of air-breathing land snail, a terrestrial pulmonate gastropod mollusc in the family Polygyridae.
