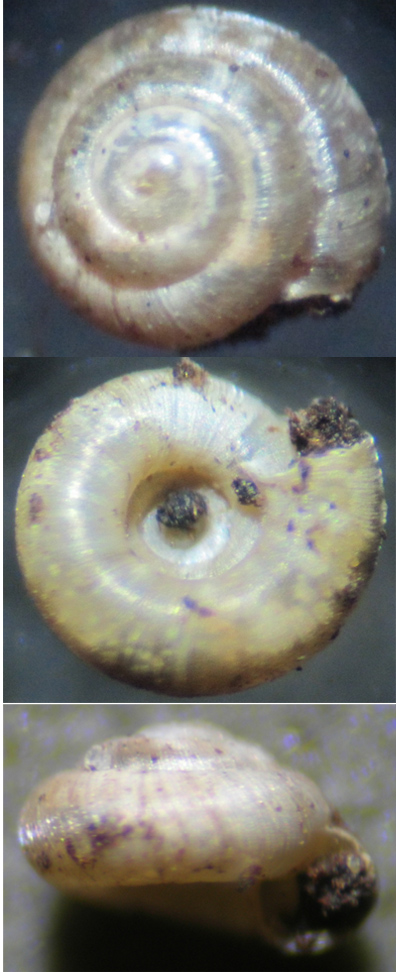
- Dorsal, ventral and apertural views of a shell of Punctum blandianum.

Conservation status
- Apparently Secure (NatureServe)

Scientific classification
- Kingdom: Animalia
- Phylum: Mollusca
- Class: Gastropoda
- Order: Stylommatophora
- Family: Punctidae
- Genus: Punctum
- Species: P. blandianum

Binomial name
- Punctum blandianum Pilsbry, 1900

= Punctum blandianum =

Species of gastropod

Punctum blandianum is a species of small air-breathing land snail, a terrestrial pulmonate gastropod mollusc in the family Punctidae, the dot snails.

== Shell description ==
The shell of P. blandianum is between 1.1 and 1.3 mm wide. The outer shell surface has a sculpture of radial striae, which are obvious under magnification. The umbilicus is about one third the width of the shell.

== Distribution ==
This species is found in the United States, in the states of Tennessee, Virginia and Alabama.

== Habitat ==
Population sizes of Punctum blandianum have been observed to be five times larger on highly acidic sites than on basic sites.
