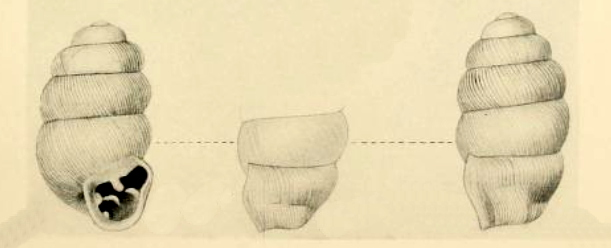
- Drawing of a shell of Vertigo arthuri

Conservation status
- Near Threatened (IUCN 3.1)

- Secure (NatureServe)

Scientific classification
- Kingdom: Animalia
- Phylum: Mollusca
- Class: Gastropoda
- Order: Stylommatophora
- Family: Vertiginidae
- Subfamily: Vertigininae
- Genus: Vertigo
- Species: V. arthuri

Binomial name
- Vertigo arthuri von Martens, 1882

Synonyms
- Vertigo (Vertigo) arthuri E. von Martens, 1882 · alternate representation; Vertigo bollesiana var. arthuri E. von Martens, 1882 (basionym); Vertigo briarensis A. B. Leonard, 1972; Vertigo coloradensis var. basidens Pilsbry & Vanatta, 1900; Vertigo gouldii hubrichti Pilsbry, 1934; Vertigo gouldii paradoxa Sterki, 1900; Vertigo occulta A. B. Leonard, 1972 junior subjective synonym

= Vertigo arthuri =

Species of gastropod

Vertigo arthuri is a species of land snail in the family Vertiginidae, the whorl snails. It is known by the common names callused Vertigo, or Midwest Pleistocene Vertigo.

It is native to North America.

- Michigan
- Wisconsin

A 2009 phylogenetic analysis of genus Vertigo revealed that many of its species should be included in the circumscription of V. arthuri. This greatly expanded the range of V. arthuri, which is now considered to have a disjunct distribution spanning from Alaska to Newfoundland to New Mexico. V. arthuri now includes many snails that were formerly considered to be rare local endemics of the American Midwest. It now has one of the largest ranges of any land snail in the Western Hemisphere.

In many areas, this snail lives in various types of forest habitat. It consumes leaf litter and organic layers on rock surfaces.

== Description ==
(Described as Vertigo gouldii hubrichti) The shell is subcylindric, larger than Vertigo nylanderi Sterki, 1909 with a similar long and deep impression over the palatal folds. The lower-palatal is deeply immersed. There is no angular lamella. The basal fold is well developed. The intermediate whorls are strongly, sharply striate
