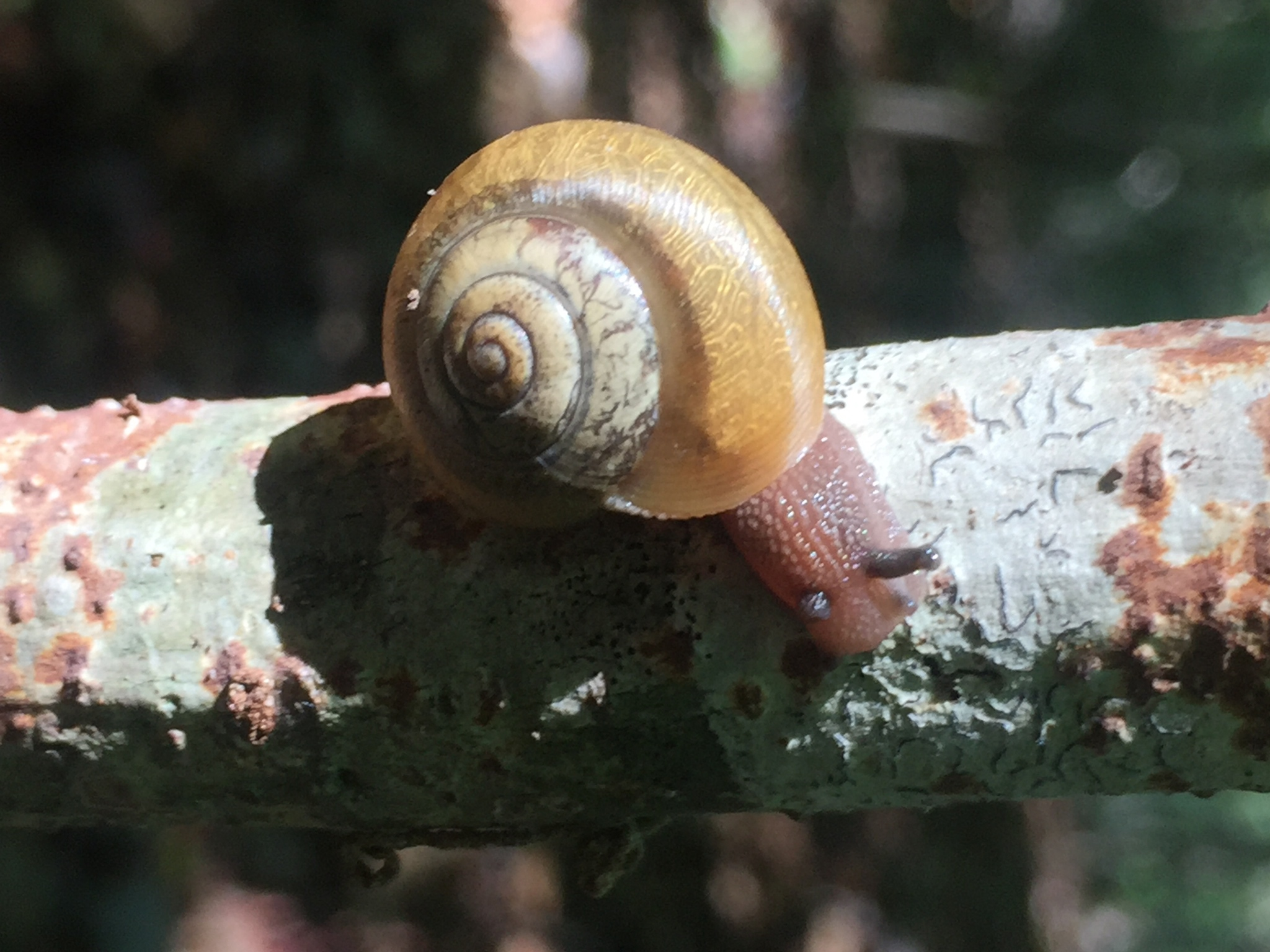

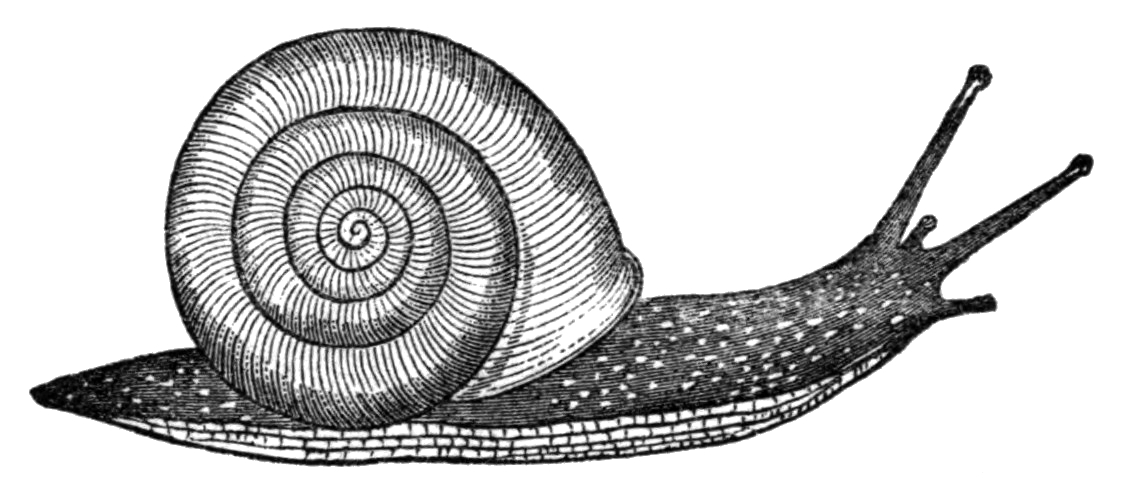
- Illustration

Conservation status
- Secure (NatureServe)

Scientific classification
- Kingdom: Animalia
- Phylum: Mollusca
- Class: Gastropoda
- Order: Stylommatophora
- Family: Polygyridae
- Genus: Neohelix
- Species: N. albolabris

Binomial name
- Neohelix albolabris (Say 1817)

Synonyms
- Polygyra albolabris

= Neohelix albolabris =

Species of gastropod

Neohelix albolabris is a species of air-breathing land snail, a terrestrial pulmonate gastropod mollusc in the family Polygyridae.

Alternate names for Neohelix albolabris are Helix albolabris and Triodopsis albolabris. It is the first land snail to be named by an American-born naturalist, Thomas Say in 1817.

Neohelix albolabris is one of the largest native land snails in North America. Its range extends from Maine to Georgia and west to the Mississippi River. In the northern part of this range some specimens may grow to have shells 30mm in diameter. In the southern part of the range, some specimens grow to 40 mm diameter.

Early New England naturalist and illustrator Edward S. Morse reported that Helix albolabris (as he called it) was one of the three most common land snails in New England. He wrote extensively about it in his pioneering work "Land Snails of New England" which was serialized in 1867 & 1868 in the first volume of The American Naturalist.

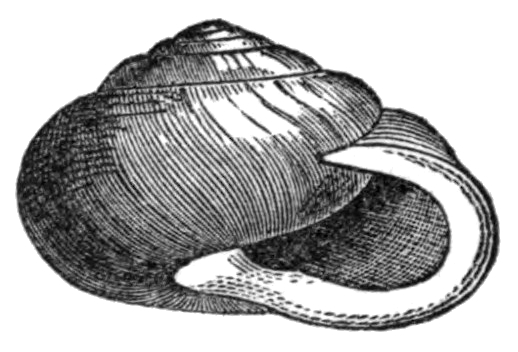
Lateral view showing the profile of the shell of Neohelix albolabris

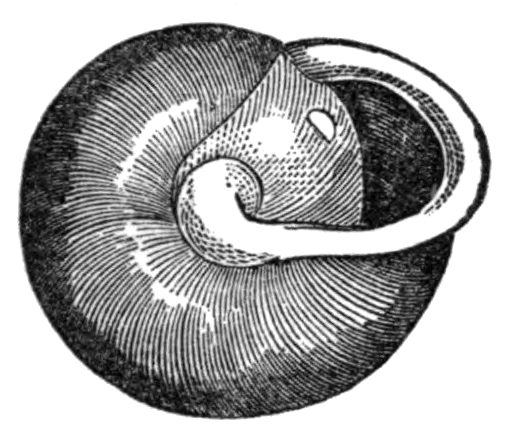
Basal view of the shell of Neohelix albolabris
