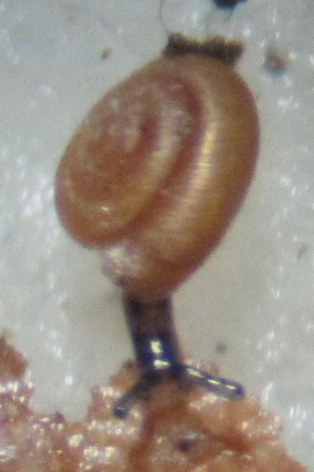
- video of Punctum minutissimum

Conservation status
- Secure (NatureServe)

Scientific classification
- Kingdom: Animalia
- Phylum: Mollusca
- Class: Gastropoda
- Order: Stylommatophora
- Family: Punctidae
- Genus: Punctum
- Species: P. minutissimum

Binomial name
- Punctum minutissimum (I. Lea, 1841)

= Punctum minutissimum =

Species of gastropod

Punctum minutissimum is a species of small air-breathing land snail, a terrestrial pulmonate gastropod mollusk in the family Punctidae, the dot snails.

== Shell description ==
The shell of Punctum minutissimum is slightly translucent and pale brown in color. It is 1.1 to 1.3 mm wide, and has 3.5 to 4.5 whorls. The outer shell surface has a sculpture of radial striae, which are obvious under magnification. The underside of the shell has a very wide umbilicus, almost 25% of the shell's width.

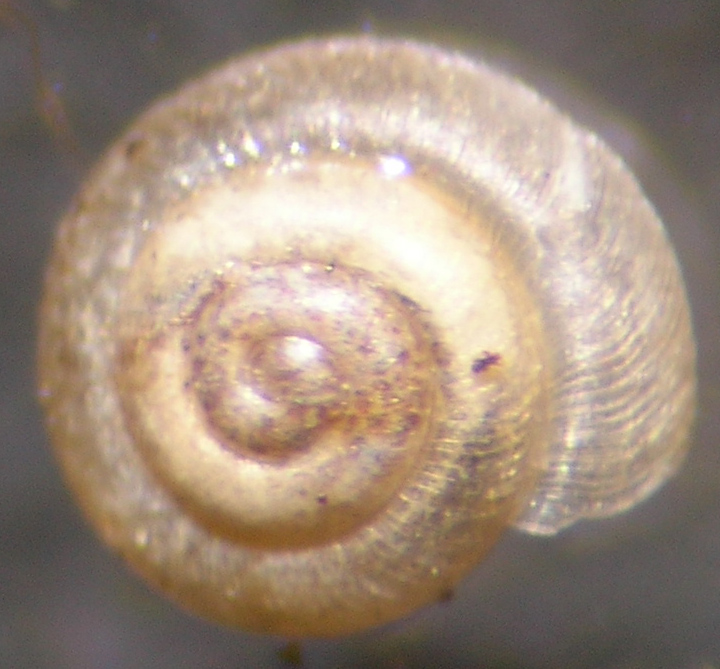
apical view

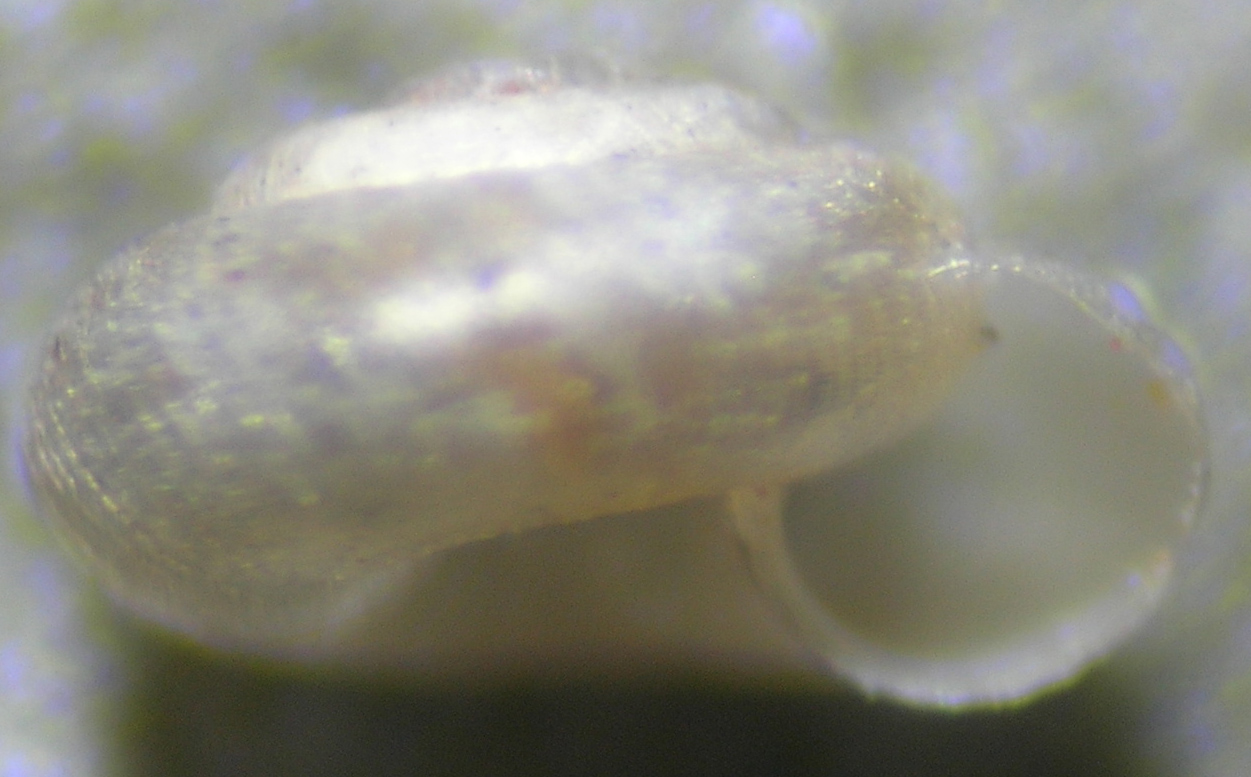
apertural view.

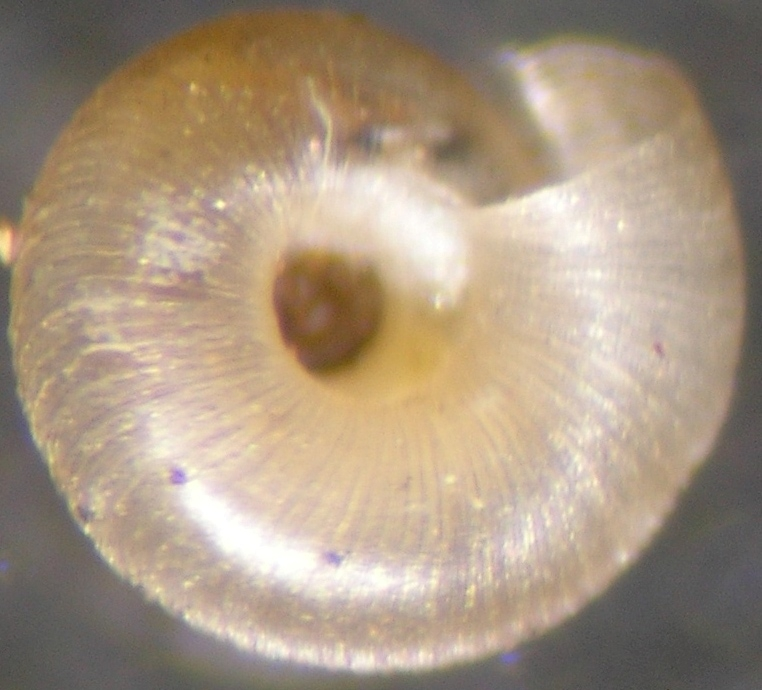
umbilical view

== Distribution ==
This species occurs in North America, from Maine to Florida, and west to Oregon and New Mexico.

== Habitat ==
This small snail lives in damp leaf litter and decaying fallen beech logs. It is often found around polypore and bolete fungi.
