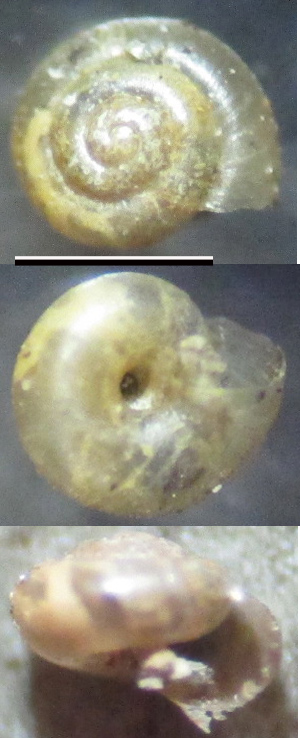
- Dorsal, ventral, and apertural views of a shell of Punctum randolphi, CM85566, Scale bar is 1 mm.

Conservation status
- Secure (NatureServe)

Scientific classification
- Kingdom: Animalia
- Phylum: Mollusca
- Class: Gastropoda
- Order: Stylommatophora
- Family: Punctidae
- Genus: Punctum
- Species: P. randolphii

Binomial name
- Punctum randolphii Dall, 1895

Synonyms
- Punctum randolphi Dall, 1895

= Punctum randolphii =

Species of gastropod

Punctum randolphii is a species of small air-breathing land snail, a terrestrial pulmonate gastropod mollusk in the family Punctidae, the dot snails.

== Shell description ==
The diameter of the shell of Punctum randolphii is between 1.25 and 1.4 mm wide. The exterior surface has a very faint sculpture of radial striae. The aperture of Punctum randolphii is wide and somewhat oblique. The umbilicus is small and deep.

== Distribution ==
Punctum randolphii is found in North America, in British Columbia, Washington, Oregon, and Idaho.
