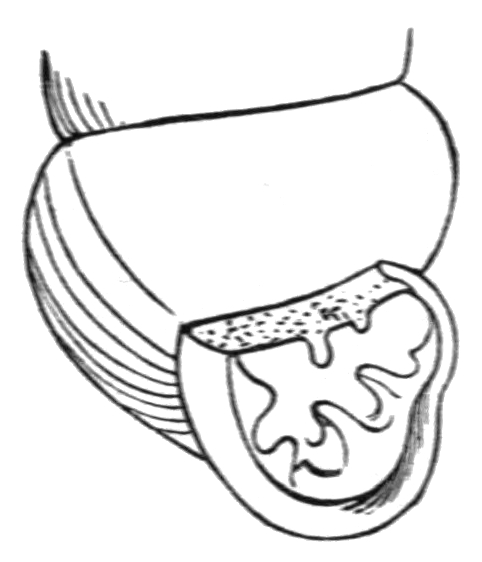
- Drawing of the aperture of a shell of Vertigo ovata

Conservation status
- Near Threatened (IUCN 2.3)

Scientific classification
- Kingdom: Animalia
- Phylum: Mollusca
- Class: Gastropoda
- Order: Stylommatophora
- Family: Vertiginidae
- Subfamily: Vertigininae
- Genus: Vertigo
- Species: V. ovata

Binomial name
- Vertigo ovata Say, 1822

Synonyms
- Cerion neglectum (Poey, 1858) ·; Pupa (Vertigo) hexodon C. B. Adams, 1849 (unaccepted combination); Pupa hexodon C. B. Adams, 1849 (junior synonym); Pupa neglecta (Poey, 1858) ·; Pupa ovata f. antiquorum Cockerell, 1891 ·; Vertigo (Alaea) ovata Say, 1822 alternate representation; Vertigo frenguellii Hylton Scott, 1946 (junior subjective synonym); Vertigo hexodon (C. B. Adams, 1849) (junior synonym); Vertigo neglecta Poey, 1858 (junior synonym); Vertigo ovata diaboli Pilsbry, 1919 ·; Vertigo ovata mariposa Pilsbry, 1919 ·; Zonites upsoni Calkins, 1880

= Vertigo ovata =

Species of gastropod

Vertigo ovata, common name the ovate vertigo, is a species of small, air-breathing land snail, a terrestrial pulmonate gastropod mollusk in the family Vertiginidae, the whorl snails.

== Description ==
The length of the shell attains 2.3 mm, its diameter 1.4 mm.

The brown shell is dextral and subovate. Its apex is obtuse. The shell contains five glabrous whorls. The suture is not very deeply impressed. The body whorl is indented near and upon the outer lip. The aperture is semioval. The outer lip is five-toothed, of which three are situated on the transverse portion of the lip, parallel to each other, equidistant. The superior and inferior ones are small, the latter sometimes obsolete, the intermediate one lamelliform, prominent. The two others are situated on the columella, approximate, extending at right angles to the three preceding ones, the superior one oblique and smaller. The outer lip is reflected but not flattened, bidentate, the teeth lamelliform and prominent. The umbilicus is distinct.

== Distribution ==
This species is endemic to and widely spread in the United States, occurring in:

- Texas, USA.
