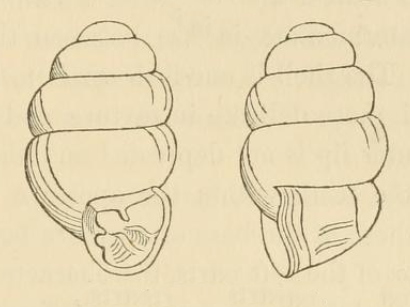
- Original drawing of the shell of Vertigo bollesiana

Scientific classification
- Kingdom: Animalia
- Phylum: Mollusca
- Class: Gastropoda
- Order: Stylommatophora
- Family: Vertiginidae
- Subfamily: Vertigininae
- Genus: Vertigo
- Species: V. bollesiana

Binomial name
- Vertigo bollesiana (E. S. Morse, 1865)

Synonyms
- Isthmia bollesiana E. S. Morse, 1865(original combination); Vertigo (Vertigo) bollesiana (E. S. Morse, 1865) alternate representation

= Vertigo bollesiana =

Species of gastropod

Vertigo bollesiana, common name the delicate vertigo snail, is a species of air-breathing land snail, a terrestrial pulmonate gastropod mollusk in the family Vertiginidae, the whorl snails.

== Description ==
(Original description) The shell is minutely perforate, cylindrical ovate, delicately striated, subtranslucent. The apex obtuse. The suture is well defined. The shell contains four subconvex whorls. The aperture is suborbicular, somewhat flattened on its outer edge. It contains five teeth, one prominent and rather curved on the parietal margin, two similar in form, the lower one the smaller, on the columellar margin, and two slightly elevated lamelliform teeth within and at the base. The peristome is subreflected and thickened.

Radula: Lingual formula 88,-12-1-12 . The central and lateral plates are notched at the outer posterior corners. The central plate is square, widening posteriorly, armed with three minute denticles with the central one largest. The laterals have two minute denticles apart with the outer denticle nearly obsolete. The uncine is scarcely notched.

Animal: The dorsal portion of body is light gray, the disk nearly white. The buccal plate is of the same width throughout, slightly rounded at the ends. The cutting edge has no projections and is finely striated.

== Distribution ==
This species can be found under dead leaves and on bark in hard wood groves throughout Maine; also in New Hampshire, Massachusetts, New York and Norfolk, Virginia.
