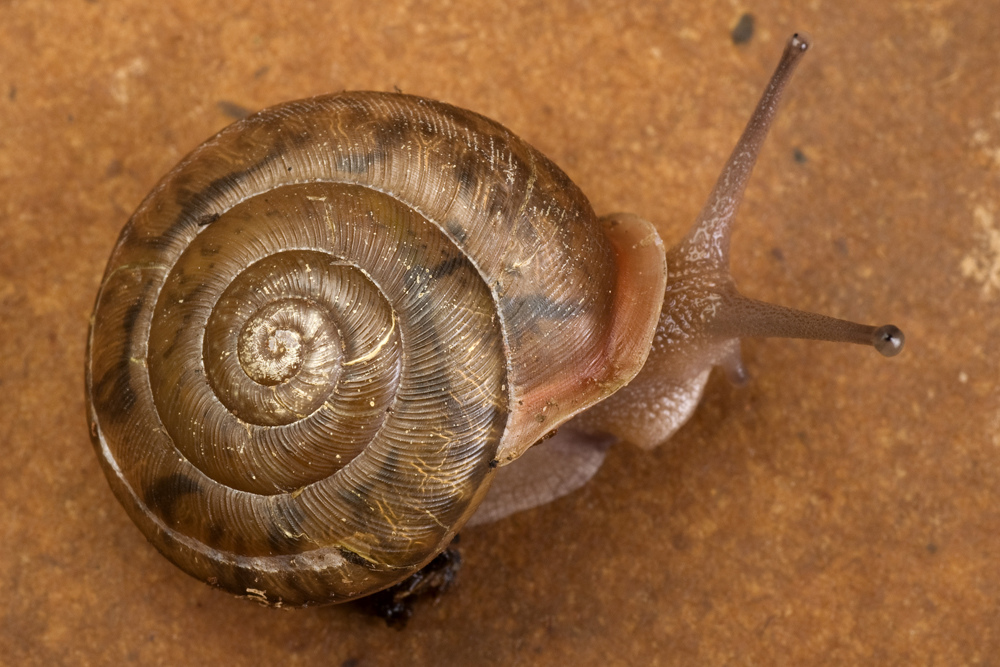
- A live individual of Neohelix dentifera

Conservation status
- Secure (NatureServe)

Scientific classification
- Kingdom: Animalia
- Phylum: Mollusca
- Class: Gastropoda
- Order: Stylommatophora
- Family: Polygyridae
- Genus: Neohelix
- Species: N. dentifera

Binomial name
- Neohelix dentifera (A. Binney, 1837)

= Neohelix dentifera =

Species of gastropod

Neohelix dentifera is a species of air-breathing land snail, a terrestrial pulmonate gastropod mollusc in the family Polygyridae.

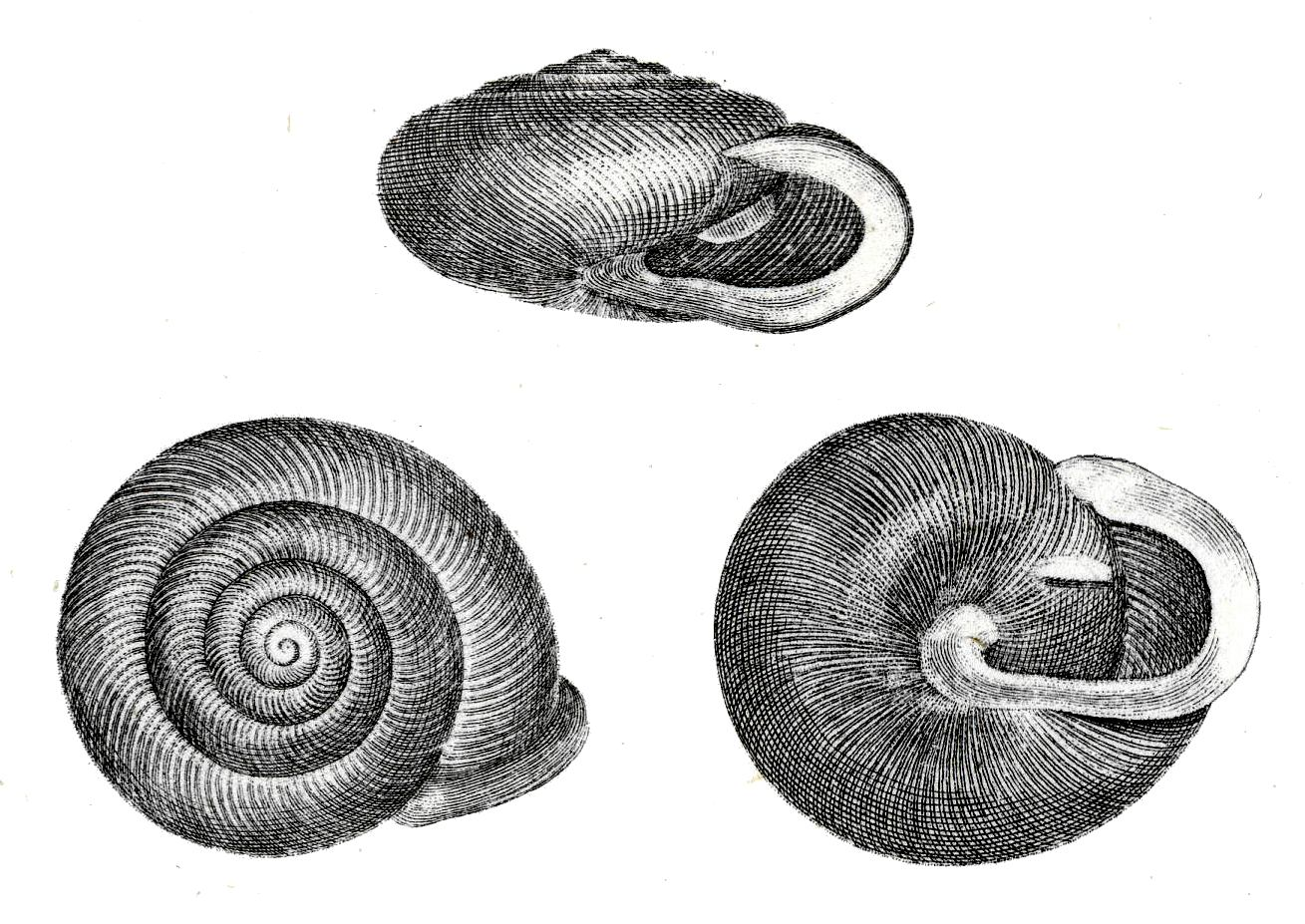
Three views of a shell of Neohelix dentifera from W. G. Binney
