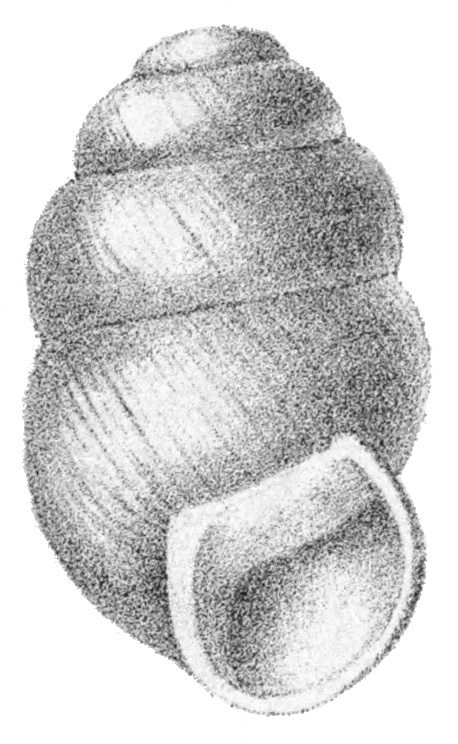
- Drawing of the shell of Vertigo genesii.

Conservation status
- Least Concern (IUCN 3.1)

Scientific classification
- Kingdom: Animalia
- Phylum: Mollusca
- Class: Gastropoda
- Order: Stylommatophora
- Family: Vertiginidae
- Genus: Vertigo
- Species: V. genesii

Binomial name
- Vertigo genesii (Gredler, 1856)

Synonyms
- Pupa genesii Gredler, 1856; Vertigo (Glacivertigo) genesii (Gredler, 1856) (unaccepted subgeneric classification); Vertigo (Vertigo) genesii (Gredler, 1856) · alternate representation

= Vertigo genesii =

Species of gastropod

Vertigo genesii, common name the round-mouthed whorl snail, is a species of small air-breathing land snail, a terrestrial pulmonate gastropod mollusc or micromollusc in the family Vertiginidae, the whorl snails. Like many other land snail species, Vertigo genesii has a high affinity to fen habitats, a type of wetland fed by mineral-rich ground water. Based of fossil records, genesii and other relative snail species were distributed in central Europe during the Later Glacial and Early Holocene period.

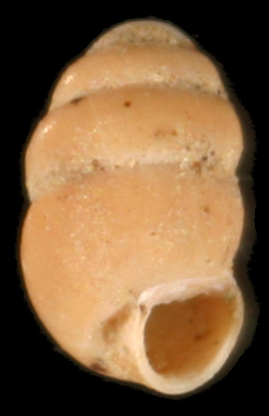
A fossil shell of Vertigo genesii.

== Shell description ==
The shell is very small, ovate, obtuse, indistinctly, spaced striate, glossy purplish brown. The shell has 4½ whorls, that are rather convex, high, rapidly increasing, joined by a somewhat impressed suture, the penult large, almost ventricose. Umbilical opening is moderate.

The aperture is semirotund, nearly quadratic, without any folds. Peristome is scarcely expanded, thickened liplike, bordered with bluish black, the margins are connected by a very weak callus, the right margin is arched at the insertion.

The width of the adult shell is 1.03–1.20 mm, the height is 1.63–2.00 mm.

== Anatomy ==
The animal body color is raven-black. The tentacles are short, contracted in the middle.

== Distribution and conservation status ==
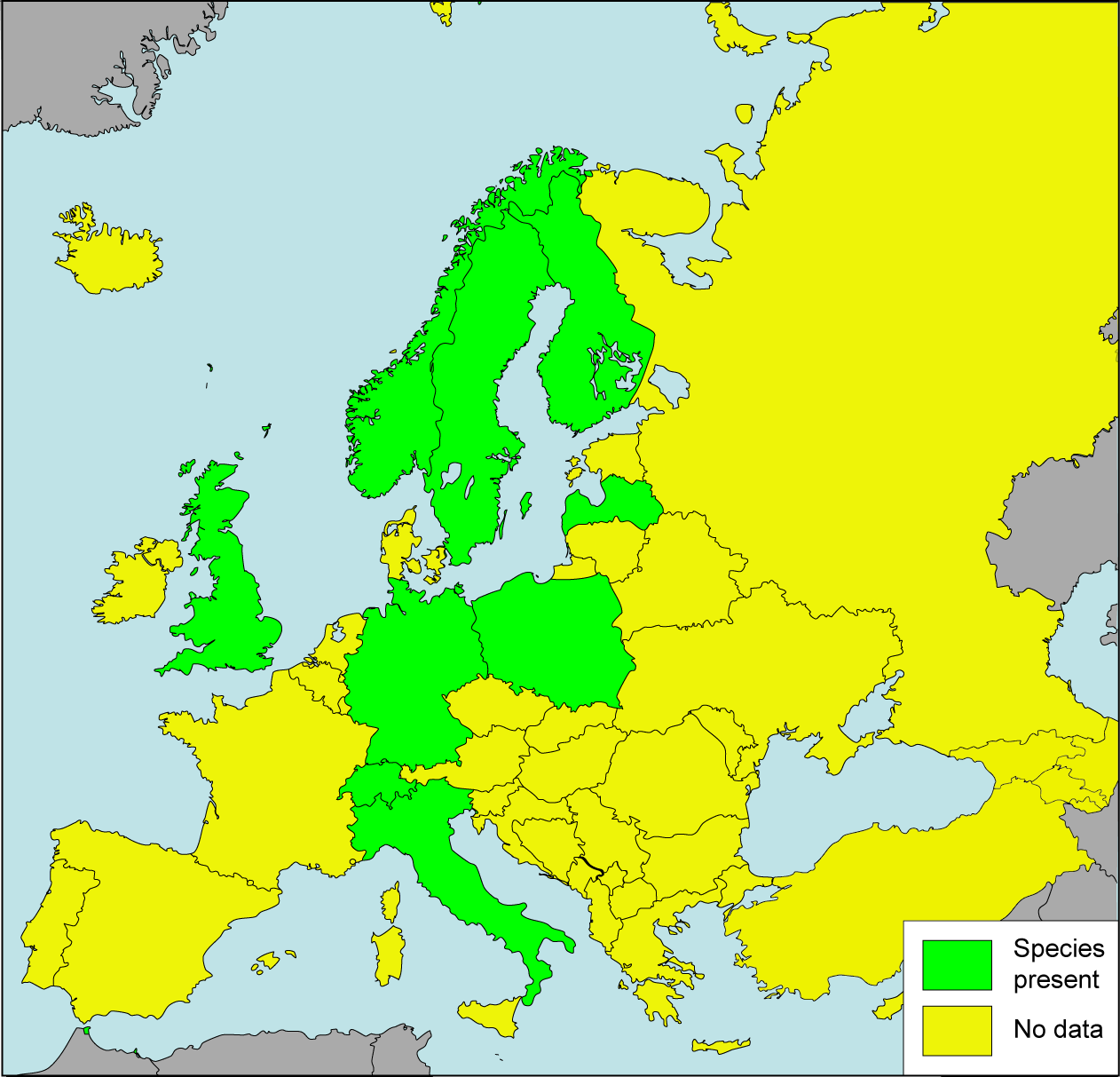
Distribution

- IUCN red list - conservation dependent
- It is mentioned in Annex II of the European Union's Habitats Directive.

This species occurs in:

- British Isles (in the United Kingdom only): Great Britain. It is endangered in Great Britain and it is listed in List of endangered species in the British Isles.
- Continental Europe: Finland, Germany, Norway, Poland, Romania, Russian Federation, Sweden, and Switzerland.
