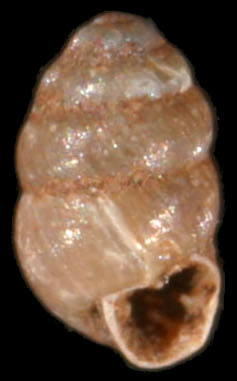
- Apertural view of a shell of Vertigo pygmaea

Scientific classification
- Kingdom: Animalia
- Phylum: Mollusca
- Class: Gastropoda
- Order: Stylommatophora
- Family: Vertiginidae
- Subfamily: Vertigininae
- Genus: Vertigo
- Species: V. pygmaea

Binomial name
- Vertigo pygmaea (Draparnaud, 1801)

Synonyms
- Alaea vulgaris Jeffreys, 1830 (junior synonym); Helix (Isthmia) cylindrica Gray, 1821 (junior synonym); Pupa (Nearctula) superioris Pilsbry, 1899; Pupa (Vertigo) heldi Clessin, 1877 (junior synonym); Pupa (Vertigo) pygmaea (Draparnaud, 1801) (superseded combination); Pupa pygmæa Draparnaud, 1801; Vertigo (Isthmia) pygmaea (Draparnaud, 1801) · alternate representation; Vertigo (Vertigo) heldi (Clessin, 1877) (junior synonym); Vertigo (Vertigo) pygmaea (Draparnaud, 1801)· accepted, alternate representation; Vertigo callosa Sterki, 1890; Vertigo heldi (Clessin, 1877) (junior synonym)

= Vertigo pygmaea =

Species of gastropod

Vertigo pygmaea, common name the "crested vertigo", is a species of small air-breathing land snail, a terrestrial pulmonate gastropod mollusk in the family Vertiginidae, the whorl snails.

== Shell description ==
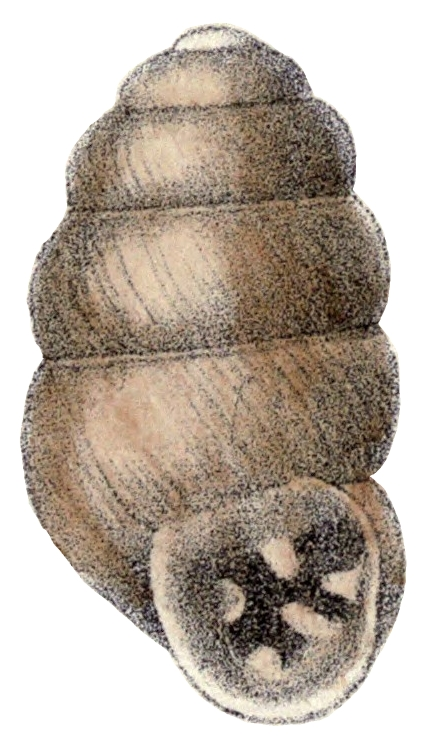
Drawing of a shell of Vertigo pygmaea

The shell is extremely small, oval-cylindric and obtuse at the summit, of a more or less deep brown, smooth and dull. The spire consists of five whorls.

The aperture is scarcely longer than wide, and nearly round, furnished with four teeth, of which the superior is acute, two deeply placed inferior, and finally one on the columellar margin. A fifth tooth is often found in the base of the aperture. The lateral margin is slightly angular in the middle. Peristome is reflected below. The umbilical crevice quite pronounced.

This snail lives under hedges.

(description as Vertigo heldi) The shell is rimate, turreted, irregularly and very finely striate, of reddish-brown color, glossy. The shell has 6 whorls, that are slowly increasing and rather convex. The first 3 whorls form a blunt summit which is about ⅓ the length of the shell. The last 3 whorls are of nearly equal height and form the remaining cylindric part of the shell. The last whorl is neither calloused nor contracted preceding the aperture.

The aperture is about ¼ the length of shell, arcuately convex, somewhat impressed on the outer side, the impression running as a groove-like depression for a short distance on the last whorl. Aperture is toothed, the teeth are reddish, very weak and placed deep in the throat: 1 tooth on the middle of the parietal wall, 1 on the columella, 2 very weakly developed, frequently wanting, on the palatal wall. Peristome is continuous, somewhat expanded, little thickened.

The width of the adult shell is 1.1-1.25 mm, the height is 2.4-2.7 mm.

== Distribution ==
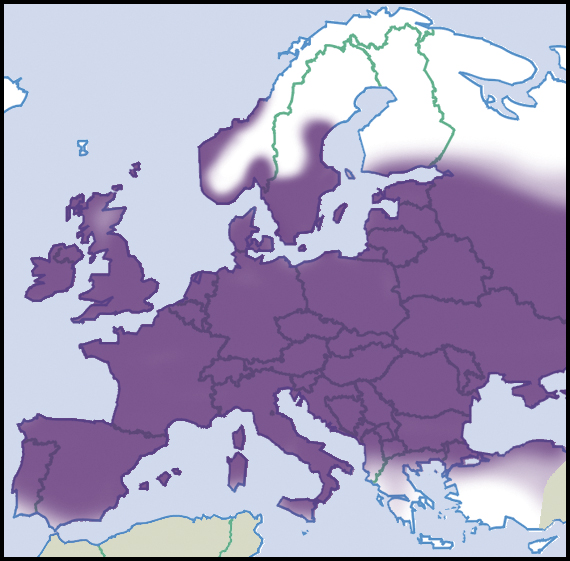
Distribution

This species occurs in Europe in the following countries and islands:

- Czech Republic
- Netherlands
- Poland
- Slovakia
- Ukraine
- Great Britain
- Ireland
- Latvia
- and others

And in America, in various places including:

- Michigan - special concern, see List of threatened fauna of Michigan
