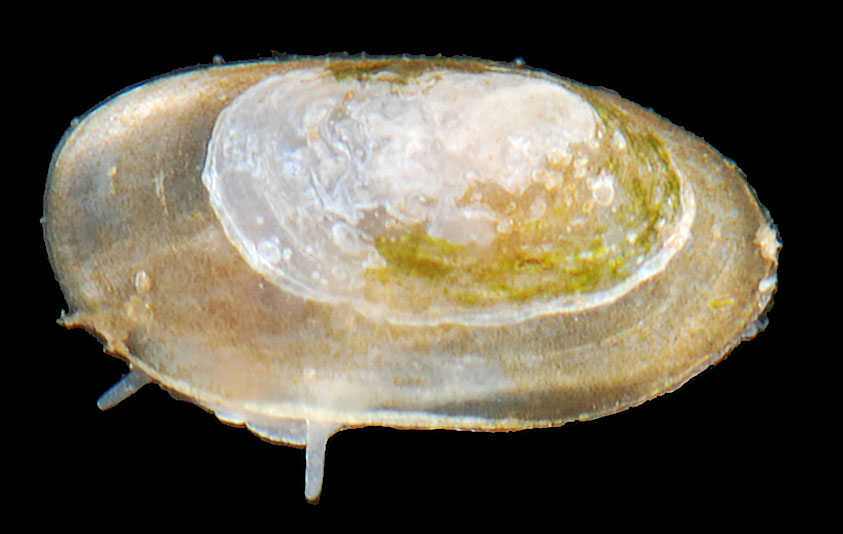

Conservation status
- Least Concern (IUCN 3.1)

- Secure (NatureServe)

Scientific classification
- Kingdom: Animalia
- Phylum: Mollusca
- Class: Gastropoda
- Superorder: Hygrophila
- Family: Planorbidae
- Genus: Ferrissia
- Species: F. rivularis

Binomial name
- Ferrissia rivularis (Say, 1817)

= Ferrissia rivularis =

Species of mollusc

Ferrissia rivularis is a species of gastropods belonging to the family Planorbidae, also known as the Creeping Ancylid.

The species is found in Northern America.
