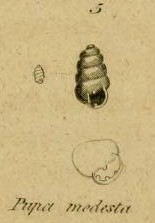

Scientific classification
- Kingdom: Animalia
- Phylum: Mollusca
- Class: Gastropoda
- Order: Stylommatophora
- Family: Vertiginidae
- Subfamily: Vertigininae
- Genus: Vertigo
- Species: V. modesta

Binomial name
- Vertigo modesta (Say, 1824)

Synonyms
- List: Isthmia corpulenta E. S. Morse, 1865 ·; Pupa borealis Morelet, 1858 (junior synonym); Pupa corpulenta var. parietalis Ancey, 1887 ·; Pupa decora A. Gould, 1847 (junior synonym); Pupa hoppii Møller, 1842 (original name); Pupa modesta Say, 1824 (original combination); Vertigo (Boreovertigo) hoppii (Møller, 1842) ·; Vertigo (Boreovertigo) modesta (Say, 1824) alternate representation; Vertigo (Glacivertigo) modesta (Say, 1824) ( ubgeneric classification); Vertigo (Vertigo) modesta (Say, 1824) ·; Vertigo castanea Sterki, 1892 (nomen nudum); Vertigo hoppii (Møller, 1842) (junior synonym); Vertigo modesta insculpta Pilsbry, 1919 ·; Vertigo modesta microphasma S. S. Berry, 1919

= Vertigo modesta =

Species of gastropod

Vertigo modesta, common name the cross vertigo, is a species of small air-breathing land snail, a terrestrial pulmonate gastropod mollusk or micromollusk in the family Vertiginidae, the whorl snails.

Subspecies

- Vertigo modesta castanea Pilsbry & Vanatta, 1900
- Vertigo modesta concinnula Cockerell, 1897
- Vertigo modesta modesta (Say, 1824)

== Description ==
(Described as Isthmia corpulenta) The shell is rimate perforate, elongate ovate, finely striated, polished, translucent, dark olive brown. The apex is round and obtuse. The shell contains four whorls, convex, tumid, wider at the base. The aperture is large, subcircular, with four obtuse teeth, one on the parietal margin, one on the columellar margin, and two on the outer lip. The peristome is slightly thickened and reflected.

== Distribution ==
This species is known to occur in a number of countries and islands including:

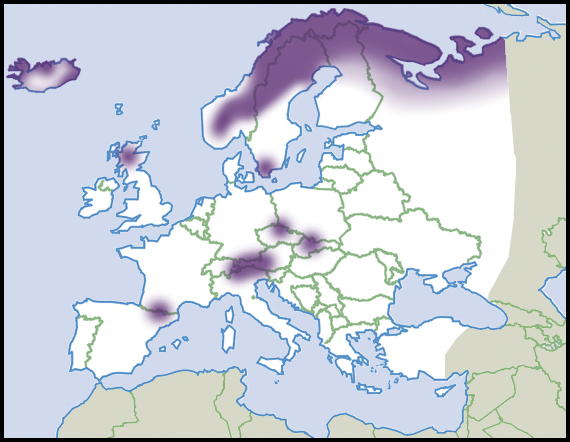
Distribution

- Texas, USA.
- Utah, USA
- Great Britain
- and other areas
