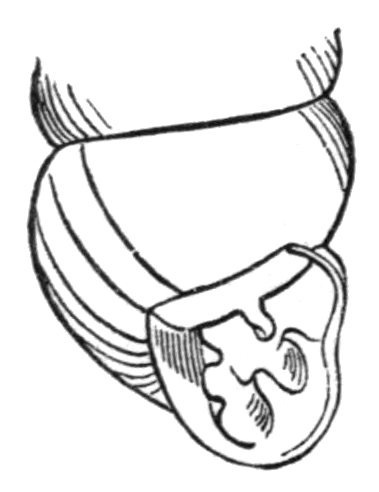
- Drawing of the aperture of a shell of Vertigo gouldii

Scientific classification
- Kingdom: Animalia
- Phylum: Mollusca
- Class: Gastropoda
- Order: Stylommatophora
- Family: Vertiginidae
- Subfamily: Vertigininae
- Genus: Vertigo
- Species: V. gouldii

Binomial name
- Vertigo gouldii (A. Binney, 1843)

Synonyms
- Pupa coloradensis Cockerell, 1889 (nomen nudum); Pupa gouldii A. Binney, 1843 (original combination); Vertigo (Vertigo) gouldi (A. Binney, 1843) · alternate representation; Vertigo coloradensis var. arizonensis Pilsbry & Vanatta, 1900; Vertigo columbiana var. utahensis Pilsbry & Vanatta, 1900 ·

= Vertigo gouldii =

Species of gastropod

Vertigo gouldii, common name the variable vertigo, is a species of small air-breathing land snail, a terrestrial pulmonate gastropod mollusk in the family Vertiginidae, the whorl snails.

Subspecies

- Vertigo gouldii arizonensis Pilsbry & Vanatta, 1900
- Vertigo gouldii coloradoensis (Cockerell, 1891)
- Vertigo gouldii inserta Pilsbry, 1919

== Distribution ==
This species occurs in:

- Texas, USA.
