= List of non-marine molluscs of Great Britain =

Location of the island of Great Britain

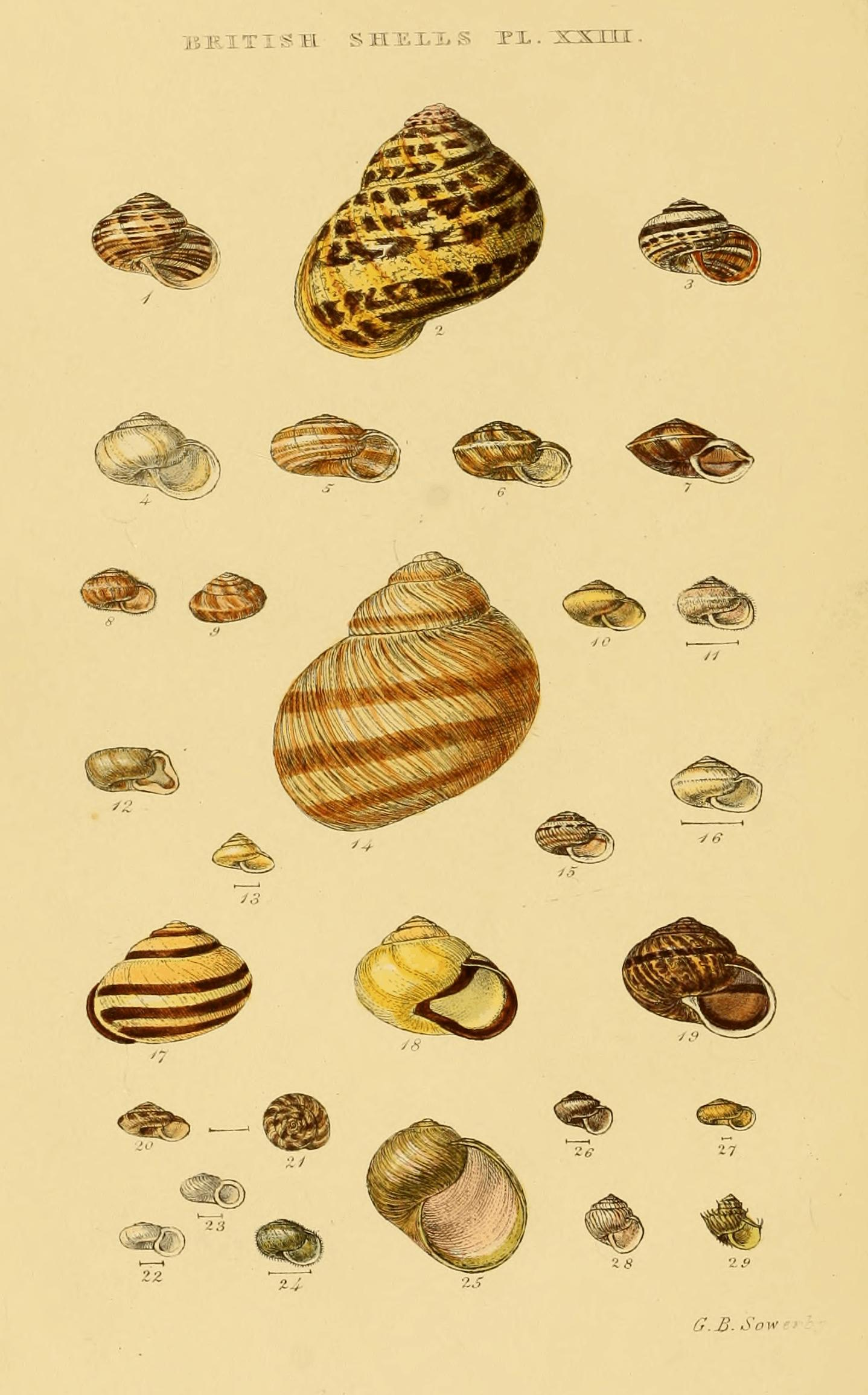
A plate from G. B. Sowerby's 1859 book Illustrated Index of British Shells shows some shells of British land snails

This list comprises 239 species of non-marine molluscs that have been recorded in the scientific literature as part of the fauna of the island of Great Britain; this total excludes species found only in hothouses and aquaria. The list includes terrestrial and aquatic gastropods, and aquatic bivalves. Molluscs that are fully marine (adapted to live in the sea) are not included here, except for two marine pulmonate snails. In other words, this list includes land snails and slugs, and freshwater and brackish water snails. It also includes freshwater mussels and clams, including some that can tolerate brackish water.

Great Britain is a European island in the northeastern Atlantic, comprising the contiguous countries of England, Scotland and Wales. (Great Britain is not the same entity as the United Kingdom of Great Britain and Northern Ireland; for more information on the complex nomenclature of this area, please see terminology of the British Isles.) The mollusc fauna of the island of Ireland, which includes both the Republic of Ireland and Northern Ireland, is listed in another article: List of non-marine molluscs of Ireland.

A number of species of snails listed here are sometimes also found on lists of marine species. Two listed here, in the genera Onchidella and Otina, are fully marine in habitat, but are pulmonate gastropods that breathe air at low tide rather than having gills like most marine species. Other species listed here live in habitats that are intermediate between land and saltwater, or in brackish water habitats intermediate between freshwater and full-salinity saltwater.

Additional species are still being added to the list of the non-marine malacofauna of Great Britain. Four of the more recent discoveries are: Papillifera papillaris, first recorded in 1993 but probably the result of introductions with Italian statuary a century or more earlier; Selenochlamys ysbryda, a species new to science, which was first found in 2004; Candidula olisippensis, discovered on a Cornish cliff in 2011; and Monacha ocellata, found near Tilbury docks in 2017. Other species have been added to the list as a result of taxonomic revisions; for instance, only in 2009 was it recognised that snails previously known as Pupilla muscorum constituted two sibling species occupying different habitats, with both Pupilla muscorum sensu stricto and Pupilla alpicola occurring in Britain. A major revision of the slug fauna published in 2014, partly based on genetic sequencing, established that there were 20% more species than had previously been recognised. Not all these species have been definitely identified and some are formally undescribed.

In addition to the species that survive outdoors in Great Britain, there are also another 15 exotic gastropod species (some terrestrial and some aquatic) which live as "uninvited guests" in greenhouses and their enclosed aquaria. These species are known as "hothouse aliens", and are listed separately at the end of the main list. In this list these species are not counted as part of the fauna. Also not included are species such as Eobania vermiculata and Milax nigricans that have been found outdoors on single occasions but seem never to have established persisting populations.

The following table shows a summary of species numbers.

Non-marine molluscs of Great Britain	
Gastropods land	152
Gastropods aquatic	55 (including 2 marine pulmonates)
Gastropods total:	207
Bivalves freshwater	32
Mollusc total:	239
Gastropods introduced (in natural habitats):	c. 31 (+16?) land + c. 8 aquatic
Bivalves introduced (in natural habitats):	4
Molluscs introduced in natural habitats, total: updated	43–59
Gastropods living as "hothouse aliens"	15 (11 terrestrial + 4 freshwater) (not included in numbers for total fauna)
Bivalves living as "hothouse aliens"	0

== Conservation ==
Those species that are recognized as endangered are shown with an E after their name, see List of endangered species in the British Isles.

Some species are protected in the United Kingdom under the Wildlife and Countryside Act 1981:

- Catinella arenaria and Myxas glutinosa are fully protected since 1981
- Margaritifera margaritifera is partly protected since 1991 and fully protected since 1998
- Helix pomatia is partly protected since 2008
- Monacha cartusiana was fully protected from 1981 to 1988.

Two of the land snails on the list (Fruticicola fruticum and Cernuella neglecta) are now locally extinct (in Great Britain, sometimes abbreviated here as G.B.), but they still occur in other parts of Europe.

== Systematic list ==
The list is arranged by presumed biological affinity, rather than being alphabetical by family.

A number of species are listed with subspecies, in cases where there are well-recognized subspecies in different parts of Europe. For some species a synonym is given, where the species may perhaps be better known under another name.

An attempt has been made to label the families as aquatic, terrestrial or intermediate, and an indication is given where it is thought that the species is introduced. Some introductions to Great Britain are quite ancient, dating from Roman times or even earlier. Those species that do not have a shell usually do not leave an archeological or fossil record, and therefore it is not always possible to determine whether they are native or introduced. Species are considered to be native, unless otherwise indicated on the list; this information is taken from Kerney (1999) updated in the case of slugs with the opinions of Rowson et al. (2014). The status and taxonomy of freshwater gastropods has been updated according to Rowson et al. (2021).

Note: the images used to illustrate the list are mostly of specimens that were found in other countries.

=== Gastropoda ===
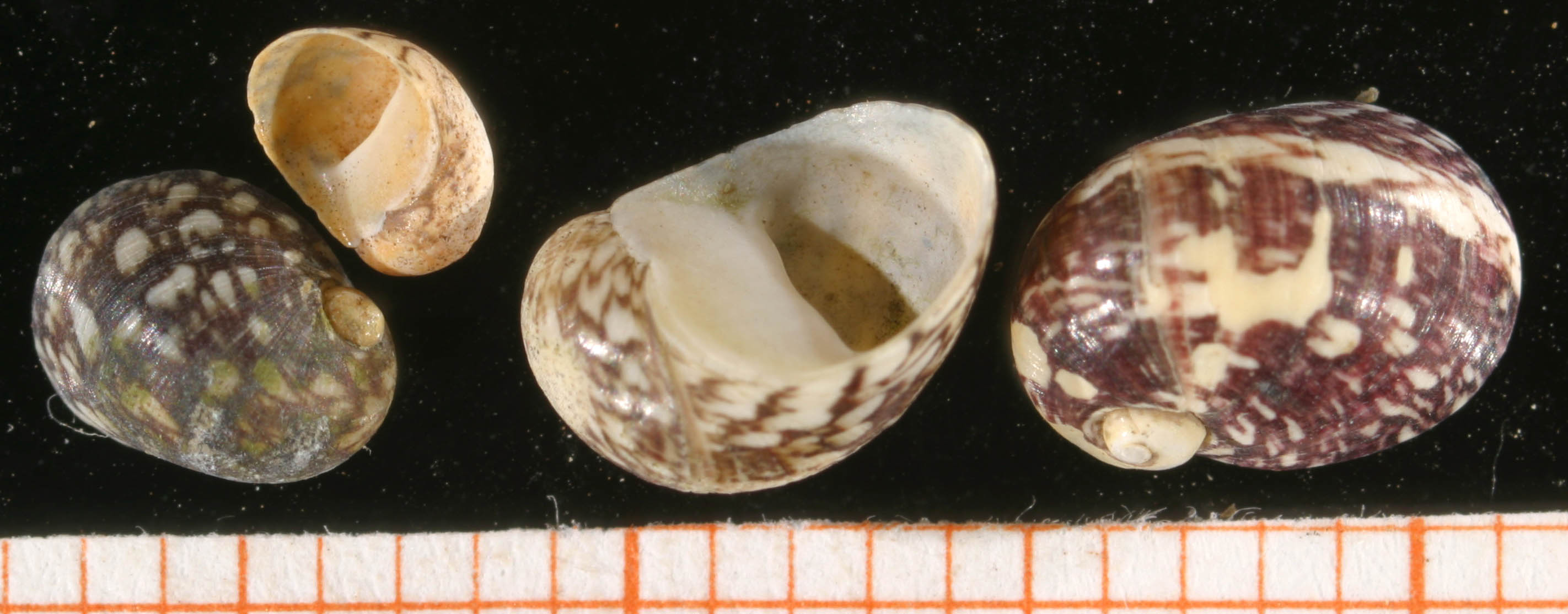
Shells of Theodoxus fluviatilis

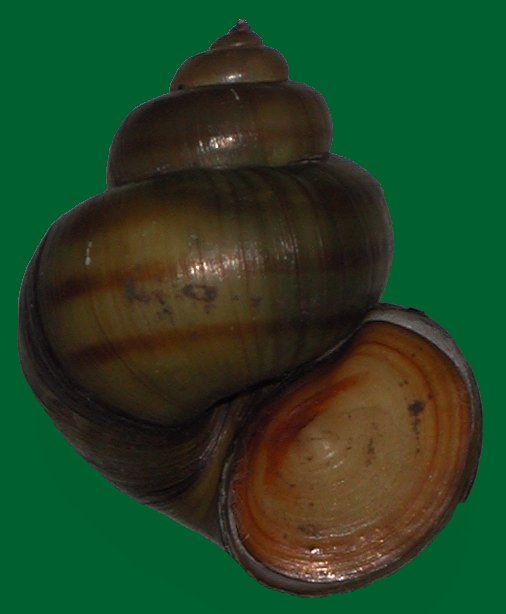
Viviparus contectus

Neritidae – aquatic (this species tolerates brackish water)

- Theodoxus fluviatilis fluviatilis (Linnaeus, 1758)

Aciculidae – terrestrial

- Acicula fusca (Montagu, 1803)

Viviparidae – aquatic

- Viviparus contectus (Millet, 1813)
- Viviparus viviparus (Linnaeus, 1758)
- Cipangopaludina chinensis (Gray in Griffith & Pidgeon, 1833) – introduced

Assimineidae – terrestrial (intermediate marine)

- Assiminea grayana J. Fleming, 1828
- Paludinella globularis (Hanley in Thorpe, 1844) – synonym: P. littorina auct. non delle Chiaje, 1828

Amnicolidae – aquatic

- Marstoniopsis insubrica (Küster, 1853) – synonym: Bithynella scholtzi (A. Schmidt, 1856) – perhaps introduced, perhaps extinct

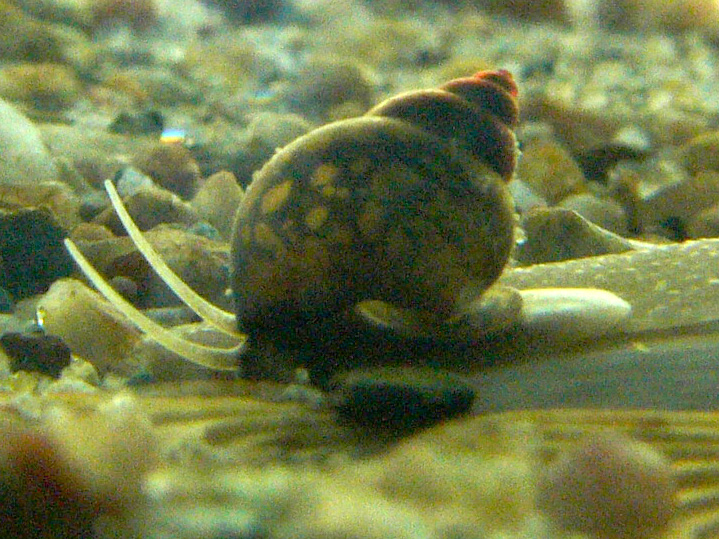
Bithynia tentaculata

Truncatellidae – terrestrial (intermediate marine)

- Truncatella subcylindrica (Linnaeus, 1758)

Bithyniidae – aquatic

- Bithynia leachii (Sheppard, 1823)
- Bithynia tentaculata (Linnaeus, 1758)

Cochliopidae – aquatic

- Semisalsa stagnorum (Gmelin, 1791) – synonym: Heleobia stagnorum – uncertain if native

Potamopyrgidae – aquatic

- Potamopyrgus antipodarum (Gray, 1843) – introduced

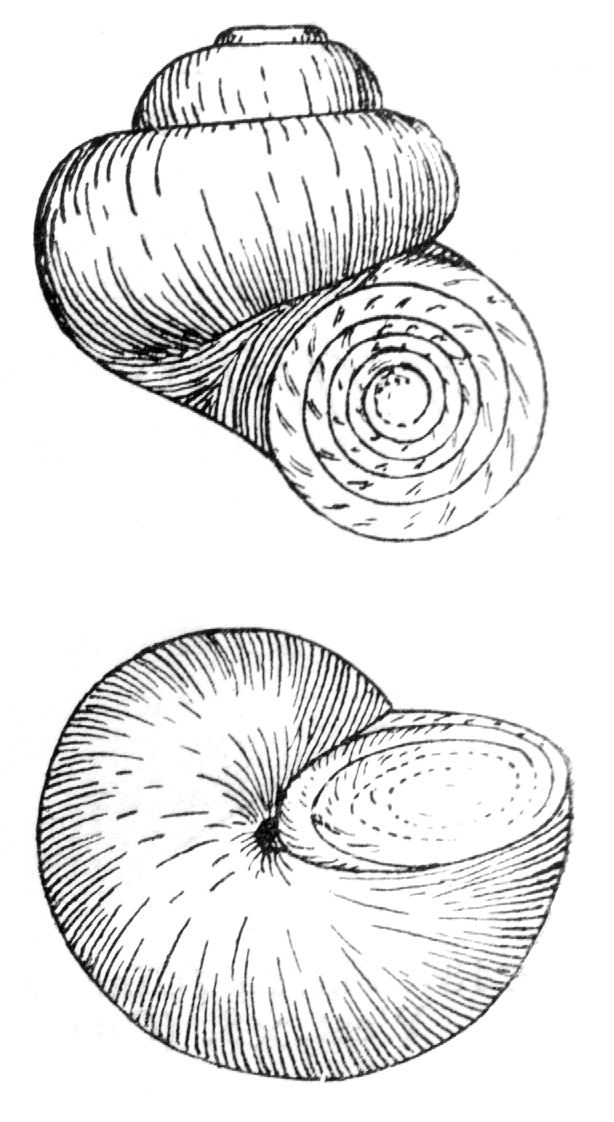
Shell of Valvata piscinalis with operculum

Hydrobiidae – aquatic (some are arguably marine)

- Hydrobia acuta (Draparnaud, 1805) – subspecies: Hydrobia acuta neglecta Muus, 1963
- Ecrobia ventrosa (Montagu, 1803) – synonym: Ventrosia ventrosa
- Peringia ulvae (Pennant, 1777)
- Mercuria anatina (Poiret, 1801) – synonyms: M. confusa auct. non Frauenfeld, 1863, M. similis auct. non (Draparnaud, 1805)

Valvatidae – aquatic

- Valvata cristata O.F. Müller, 1774
- Valvata macrostoma Mörch, 1864
- Valvata piscinalis (O.F. Müller, 1774)

Pomatiidae – terrestrial

- Pomatias elegans (O.F Müller, 1774)

The following gastropods are pulmonates:

Ellobiidae – terrestrial

- Carychium minimum O.F Müller, 1774
- Carychium tridentatum (Risso, 1826)
- Leucophytia bidentata (Montagu, 1808)
- Myosotella denticulata (Montagu, 1803)
- Myosotella myosotis (Draparnaud, 1801)

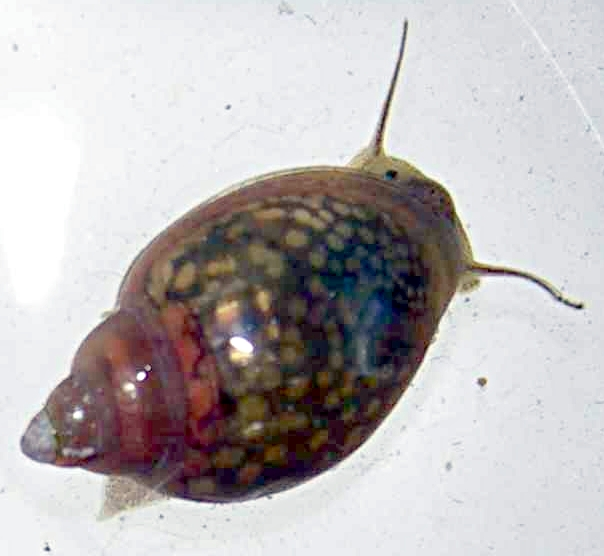
Physella acuta

Onchidiidae – aquatic (marine but an intertidal pulmonate)

- Onchidella celtica (Cuvier, 1817)

Otinidae – aquatic (marine but an intertidal pulmonate)

- Otina ovata (Brown, 1827)

Lymnaeidae – aquatic

- Ampullaceana balthica (Linnaeus, 1758) – synonyms: Radix balthica, Radix peregra auct. non (O.F. Müller, 1774)
- Galba truncatula (O.F. Müller, 1774)
- Ladislavella catascopium (Say, 1817) – introduced, believed extinct
- Lymnaea stagnalis (Linnaeus, 1758)
- Myxas glutinosa (O.F. Müller, 1774) E
- Omphiscola glabra (O.F. Müller, 1774)
- Radix auricularia (Linnaeus, 1758)
- Stagnicola fuscus (C. Pfeiffer, 1821) – synonym: Lymnaea fusca
- Stagnicola palustris (O.F. Müller, 1774) – synonym: Lymnaea palustris

Physidae – aquatic

- Aplexa hypnorum (Linnaeus, 1758)
- Physa fontinalis (Linnaeus, 1758)
- Physella acuta (Draparnaud, 1805) – synonym: Physella heterostropha (Say, 1817) – introduced
- Physella gyrina (Say, 1821) – introduced

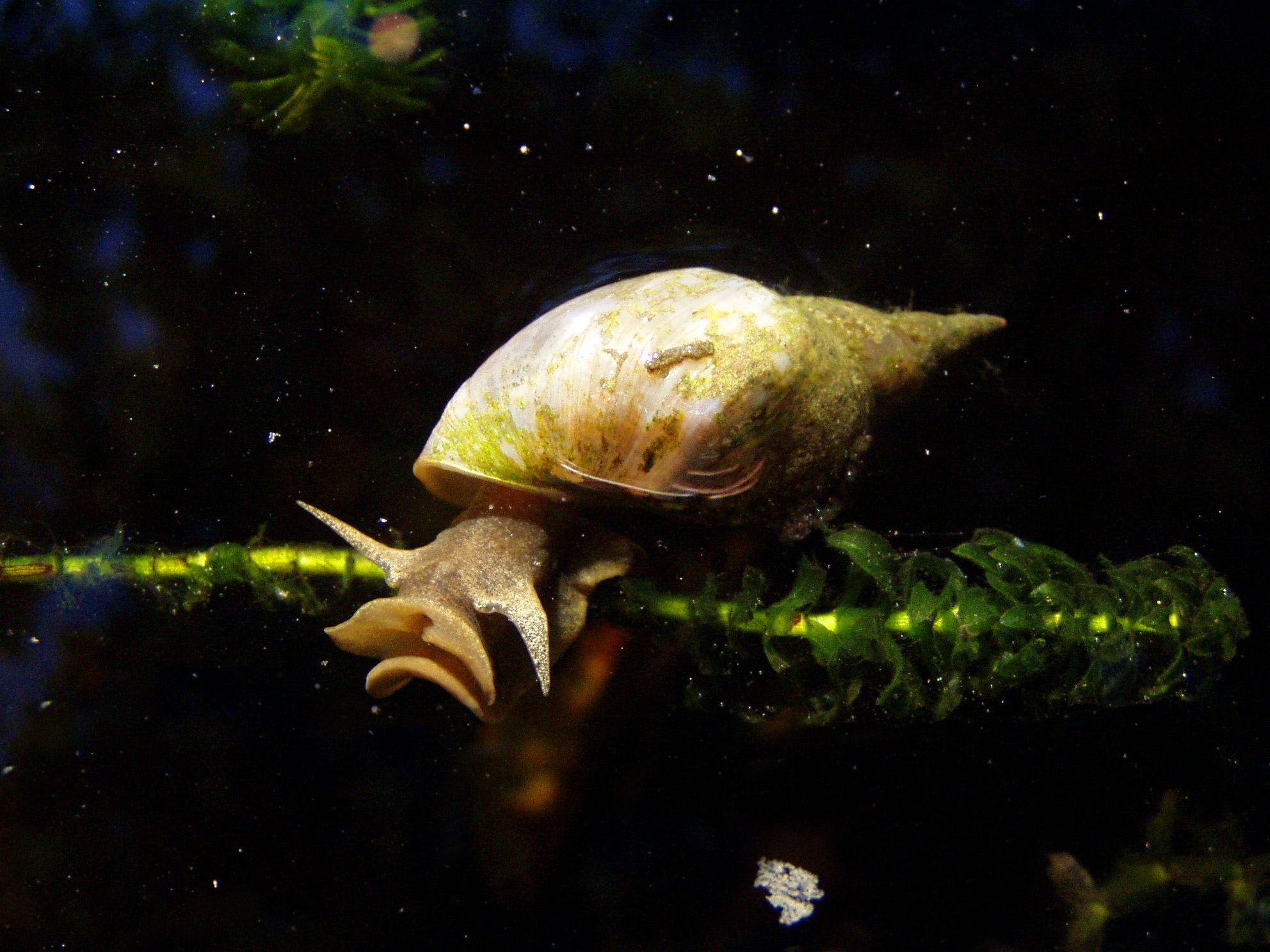
Lymnaea stagnalis

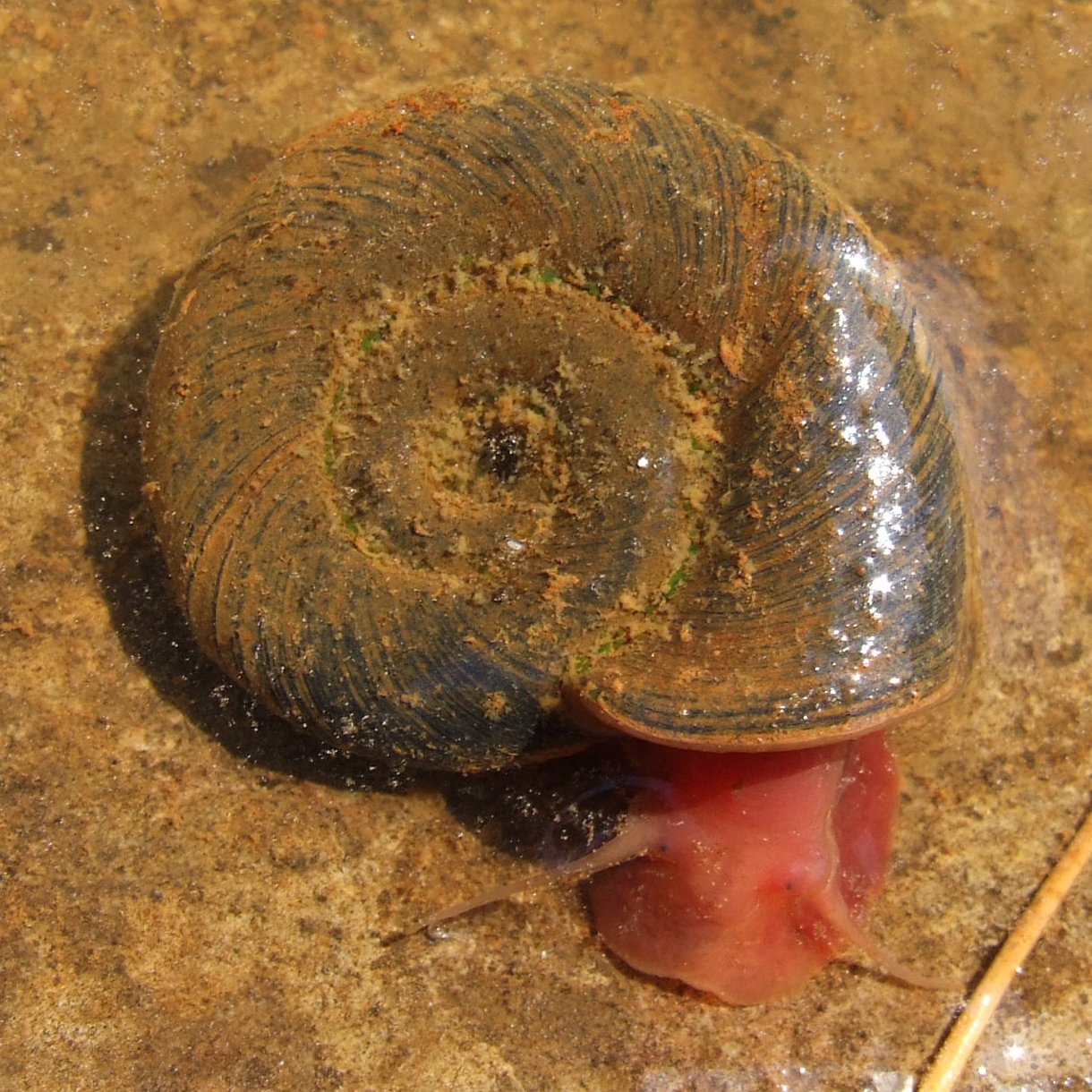
Planorbarius corneus

Planorbidae – aquatic

- Ancylus fluviatilis (O.F. Müller, 1774)
- Anisus leucostoma (Millet, 1813)
- Anisus spirorbis (Linnaeus, 1758)
- Anisus vortex (Linnaeus, 1758)
- Anisus vorticulus (Troschel, 1834) E
- Bathyomphalus contortus (Linnaeus, 1758)
- Ferrissia californica (Rowell, 1863) – synonyms: F. wautieri (Mirolli, 1960), F. fragilis (Tryon, 1863) – introduced
- Gyraulus acronicus (A. Férussac, 1807)
- Gyraulus albus (O.F. Müller, 1774)
- Gyraulus crista (Linnaeus, 1758)
- Gyraulus laevis (Alder, 1838)
- Hippeutis complanatus (Linnaeus, 1758)
- Menetus dilatatus (Gould, 1841) – introduced
- Planorbarius corneus corneus (Linnaeus, 1758)
- Planorbis carinatus O.F. Müller, 1774
- Planorbis planorbis (Linnaeus, 1758)
- Segmentina nitida (O.F. Müller, 1774) E

Acroloxidae – aquatic

- Acroloxus lacustris (Linnaeus, 1758)

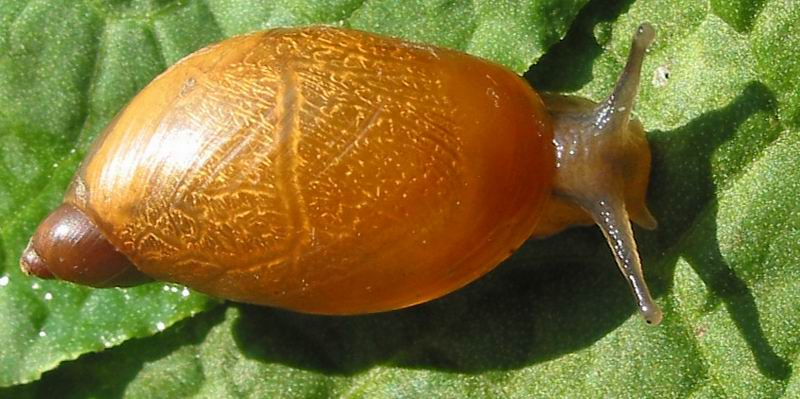
Succinea putris

Succineidae – terrestrial (some almost amphibious)

- Quickella arenaria (Potiez & Michaud, 1838) – synonym:Catinella arenaria
- Succinella oblonga Draparnaud, 1801
- Succinea putris Linnaeus, 1758
- Oxyloma elegans elegans (Risso, 1826) – synonym: Oxyloma pfeifferi (Rossmässler, 1835)
- Oxyloma sarsii (Esmark, 1886)

Cochlicopidae – terrestrial

- Azeca goodalli (A. Férrusac, 1821)
- Cochlicopa cf. lubrica – synonym: Cochlicopa lubrica (O.F. Müller, 1774)
- Cochlicopa cf. lubricella – synonym: Cochlicopa lubricella (Porro, 1838)

Pyramidulidae – terrestrial

- Pyramidula pusilla (Vallot, 1801)

Vertiginidae – terrestrial

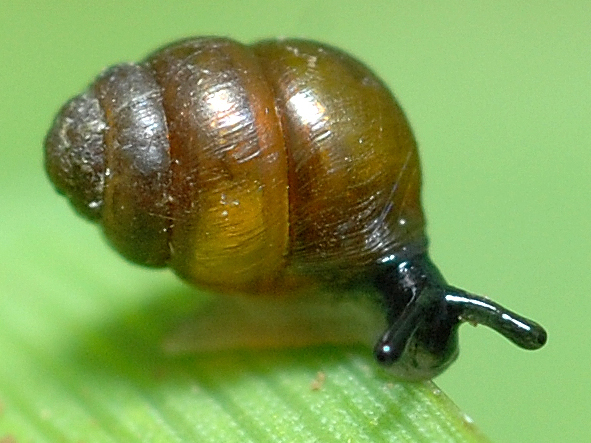
Vertigo moulinsiana

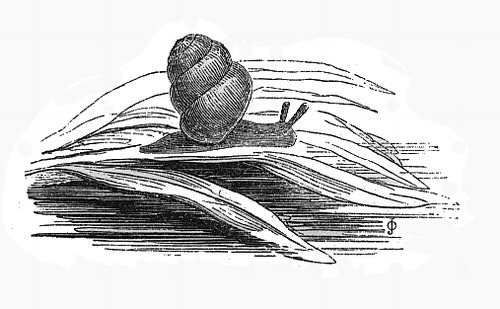
Vertigo substriata

- Columella edentula (Draparnaud, 1805)
- Columella aspera Walden, 1966
- Truncatellina cylindrica (Férussac, 1807)
- Truncatellina callicratis (Scacchi, 1833) – probably native
- Vertigo pusilla O.F. Müller, 1774
- Vertigo alpestris Alder, 1838
- Vertigo antivertigo (Draparnaud, 1801)
- Vertigo genesii (Gredler, 1856)
- Vertigo geyeri Lindholm, 1925
- Vertigo lilljeborgi (Westerlund, 1871)
- Vertigo modesta arctica (Say, 1824)
- Vertigo moulinsiana (Dupuy, 1849)
- Vertigo pusilla O.F. Müller, 1774
- Vertigo pygmaea (Draparnaud, 1801)
- Vertigo substriata (Jeffreys, 1833)
- Vertigo angustior Jeffreys, 1830

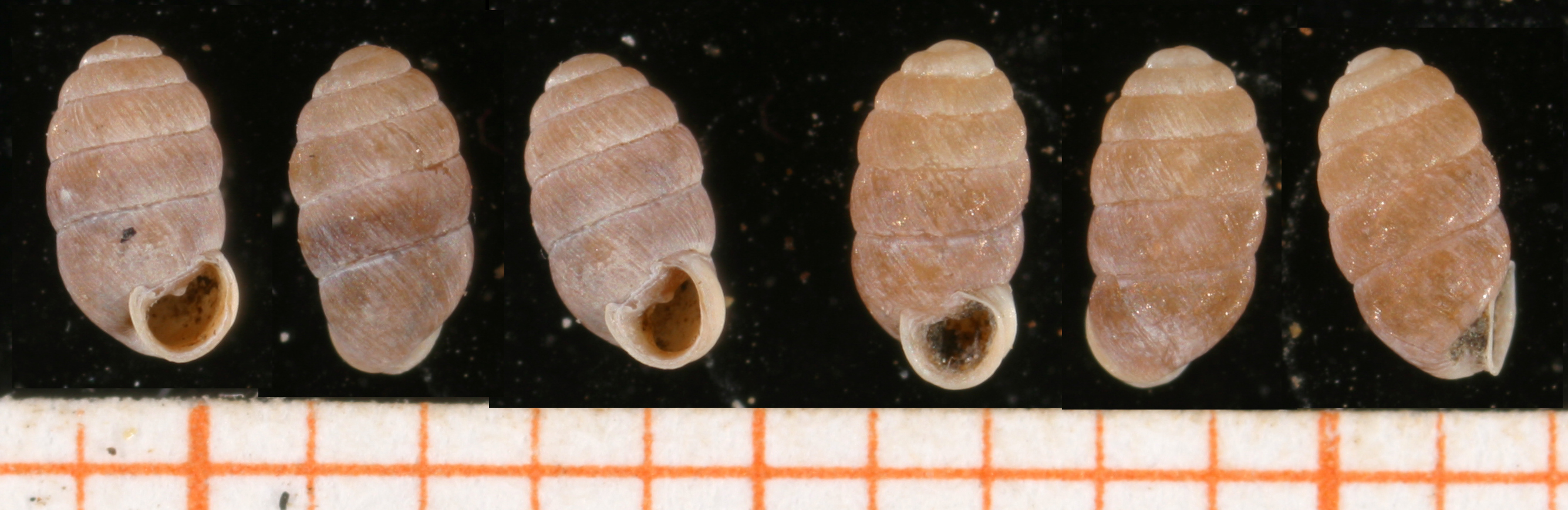
Shells of Pupilla muscorum

Chondrinidae – terrestrial

- Abida secale secale (Draparnaud, 1801)

Pupillidae – terrestrial

- Pupilla muscorum (Linnaeus, 1758)
- Pupilla alpicola (Charpentier, 1837)

Lauriidae – terrestrial

- Leiostyla anglica (Wood, 1828)
- Lauria cylindracea (da Costa, 1778)
- Lauria sempronii (Charpentier, 1837) – probably native

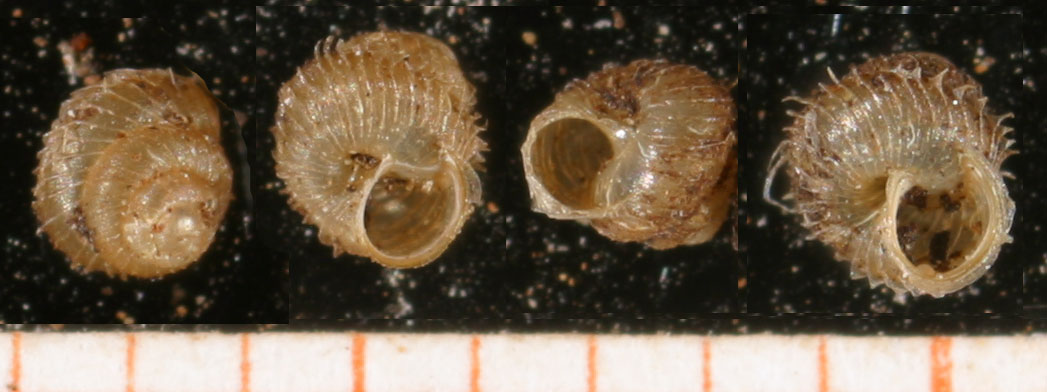
Shells of Acanthinula aculeata

Valloniidae – terrestrial

- Vallonia costata (O.F. Müller, 1774)
- Vallonia pulchella (O.F. Müller, 1774)
- Vallonia cf. excentrica – synonym: Vallonia excentrica Sterke, 1892
- Acanthinula aculeata (O.F. Müller, 1774)
- Spermodea lamellata (Jeffreys, 1830)

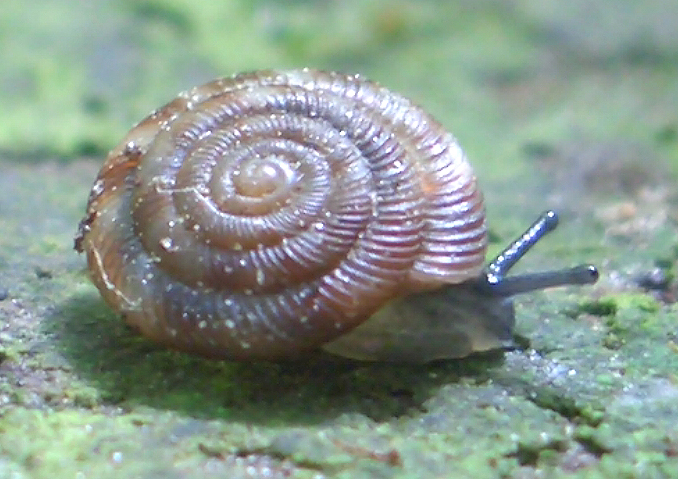
Discus rotundatus

Enidae – terrestrial

- Ena montana (Draparnaud, 1801)
- Merdigera obscura (O.F. Müller, 1774) – synonym: Ena obscura

Punctidae – terrestrial

- Punctum pygmaeum (Draparnaud, 1801)
- Paralaoma servilis (Shuttleworth, 1852) – introduced

Helicodiscidae – terrestrial

- Lucilla singleyana – synonym :Helicodiscus singleyanus Pilsbry, 1890 – introduced

Discidae – terrestrial

- Discus rotundatus rotundatus (O.F. Müller, 1774)

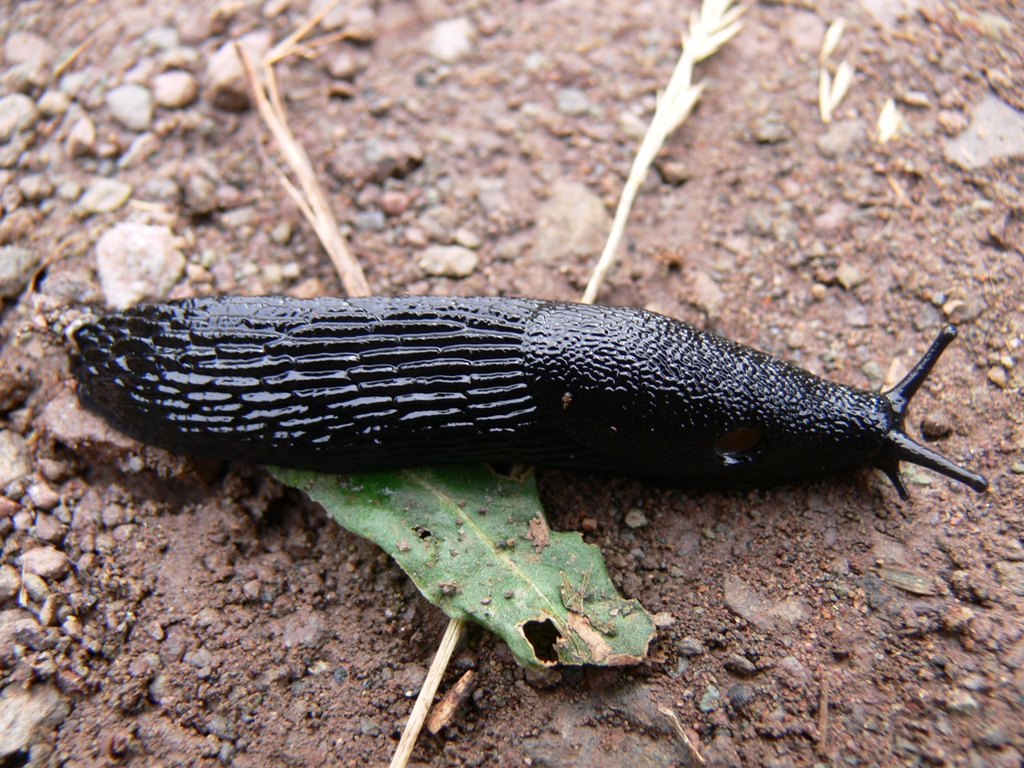
Arion ater

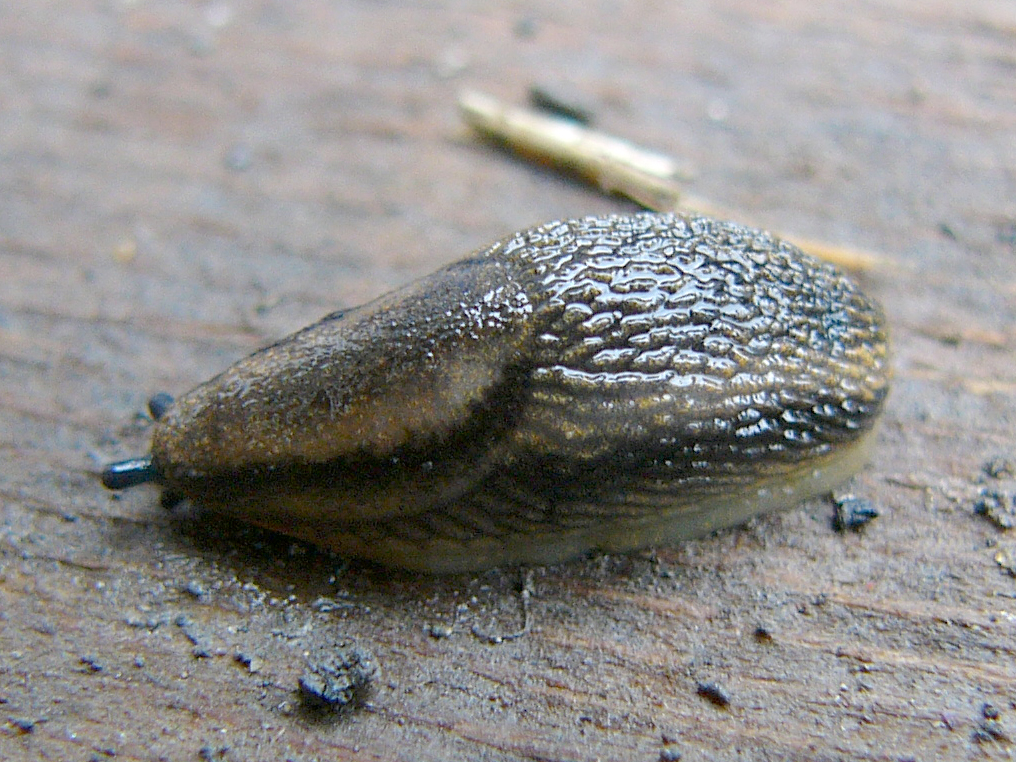
Arion distinctus

Arionidae – terrestrial

- Arion ater (Linnaeus, 1758)
- Arion rufus (Linnaeus, 1758)
- Arion flagellus Collinge, 1893 – introduced?
- Arion vulgaris Moquin-Tandon, 1855 – synonym: Arion lusitanicus auct. non Mabille, 1868 – introduced
- Arion sp. "Davies" – introduced?
- Arion subfuscus Draparnaud, 1805
- Arion fuscus O.F. Müller, 1774 – introduced?
- Arion cf. iratii Garrido, Castillejo & Iglesias, 1995 – introduced?
- Arion circumscriptus Johnston, 1828
- Arion silvaticus Lohmander, 1937
- Arion fasciatus (Nilsson, 1823) – introduced?
- Arion hortensis A. Férussac, 1819
- Arion distinctus J. Mabille, 1868
- Arion owenii Davies, 1979
- Arion cf. fagophilus de Winter, 1986 – introduced?
- Arion intermedius (Normand, 1852)

Pristilomatidae – terrestrial

- Vitrea contracta (Westerlund, 1871)
- Vitrea crystallina (O.F. Müller, 1774)
- Vitrea subrimata (Reinhardt, 1871)

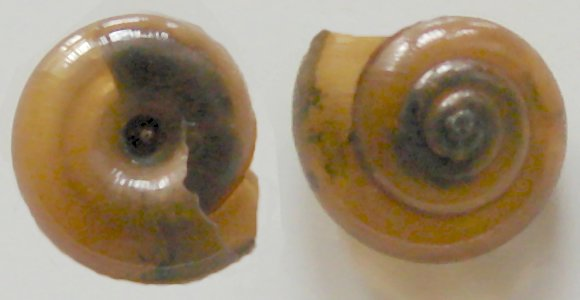
Shells of Zonitoides nitidus

Euconulidae – terrestrial

- Euconulus fulvus (O.F. Müller, 1774)
- Euconulus alderi (J.E. Gray, 1840)

Gastrodontidae – terrestrial

- Zonitoides nitidus (O.F. Müller, 1774)
- Zonitoides excavatus (Alder, 1830)

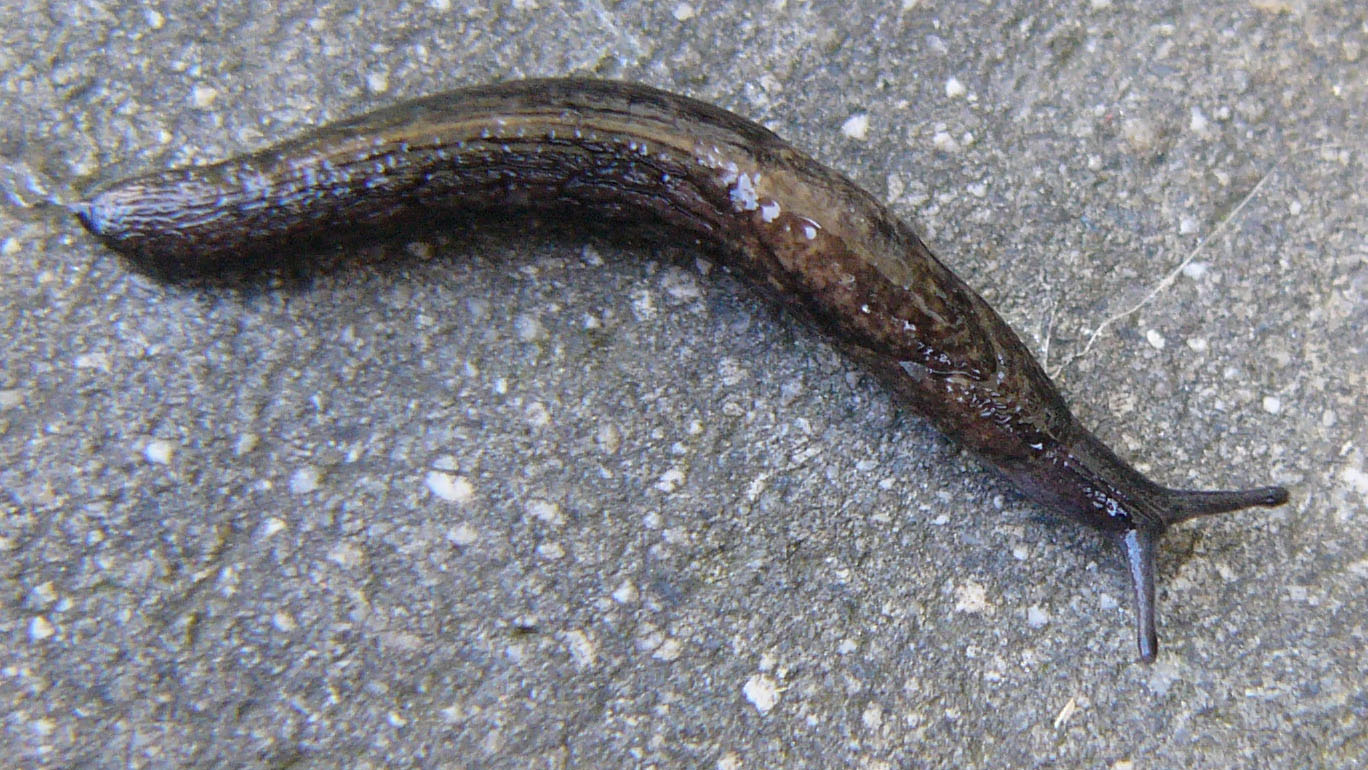
Tandonia budapestensis

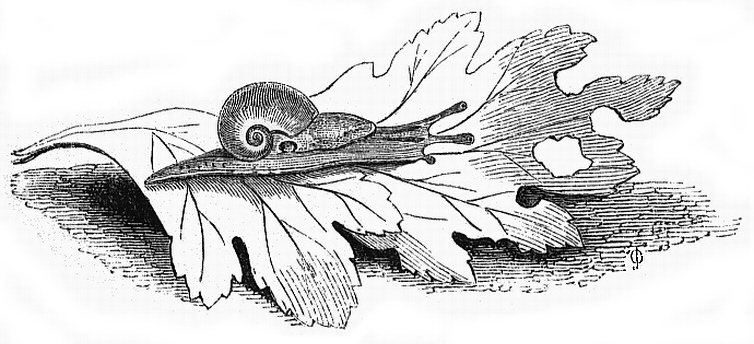
Vitrina pellucida

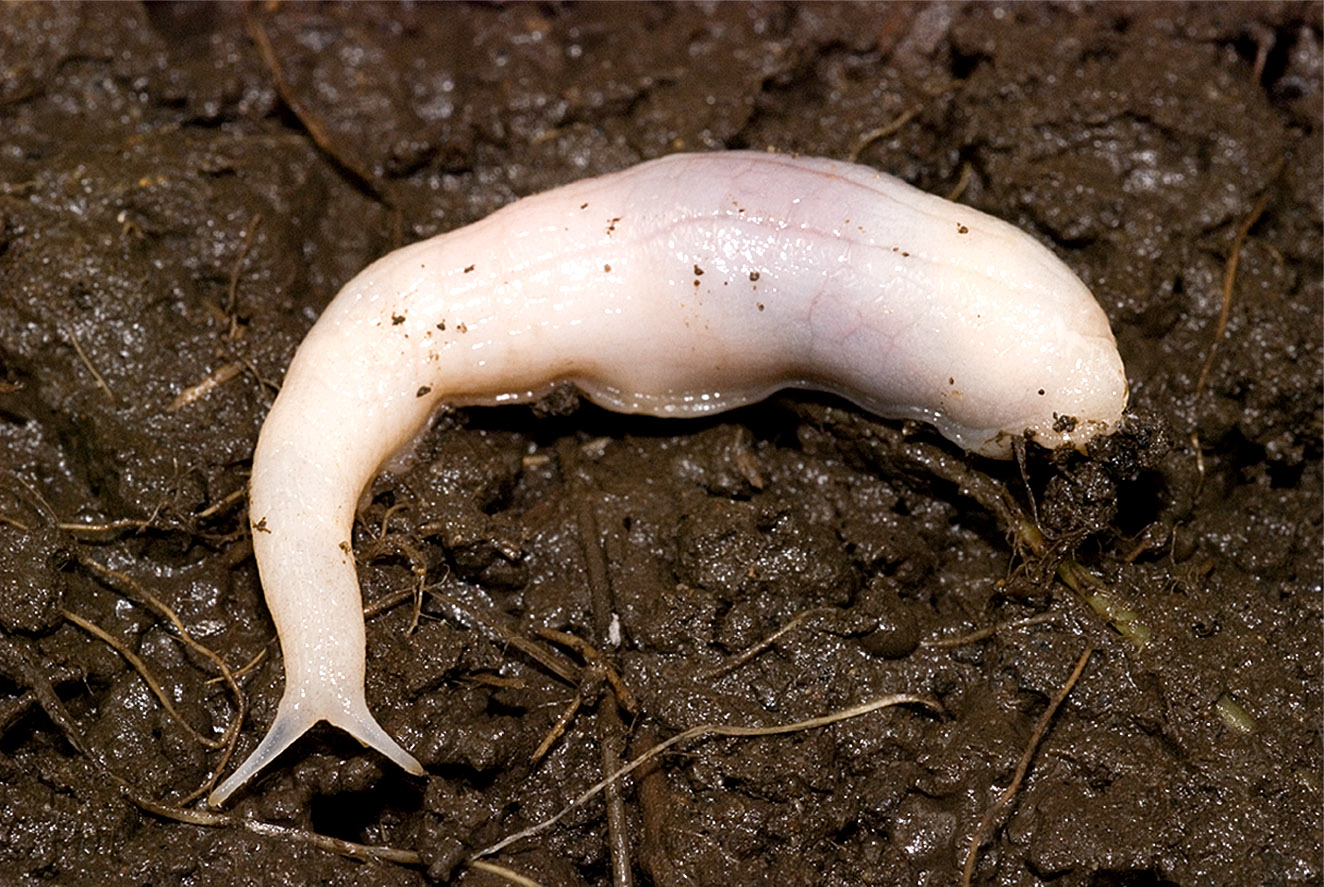
Selenochlamys ysbryda

Oxychilidae – terrestrial

- Oxychilus alliarius (Miller, 1822)
- Oxychilus cellarius (O.F. Müller, 1774)
- Oxychilus draparnaudi draparnaudi (Beck, 1837) – introduced
- Oxychilus navarricus helveticus (Blum, 1881) – introduced?
- Aegopinella nitidula (Draparnaud, 1805)
- Aegopinella pura (Alder, 1830)
- Nesovitrea hammonis (Ström, 1765) – synonym: Perpolita hammonis
- Daudebardia rufa (Draparnaud, 1805) – introduced

Milacidae – terrestrial

- Milax gagates (Draparnaud, 1801) – introduced?
- Tandonia rustica (Millet, 1843) – introduced?
- Tandonia budapestensis (Hazay, 1881) – introduced
- Tandonia cf. cristata (Kaleniczenko, 1851) – introduced
- Tandonia sowerbyi (A. Férussac, 1823) – introduced?

Vitrinidae – terrestrial

- Vitrina pellucida (O.F. Müller, 1774)
- Phenacolimax major (A. Férussac, 1807) – probably native

Boettgerillidae – terrestrial

- Boettgerilla pallens Simroth, 1912 – introduced

Trigonochlamydidae – terrestrial

- Selenochlamys ysbryda Rowson & Symondson, 2008 – introduced

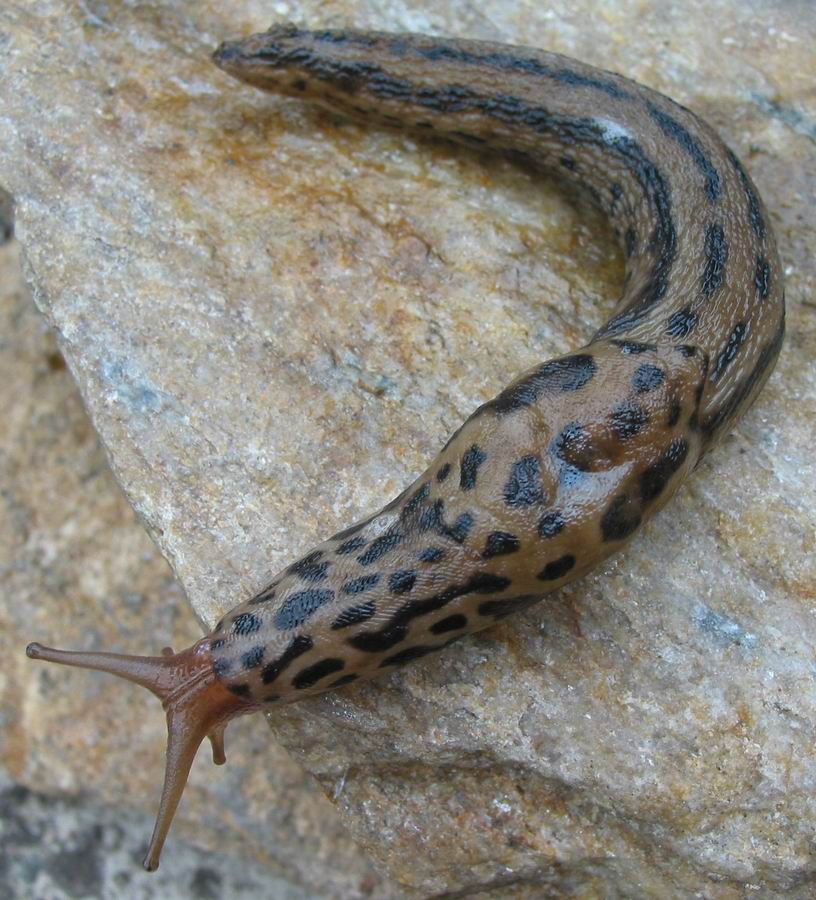
Limax maximus

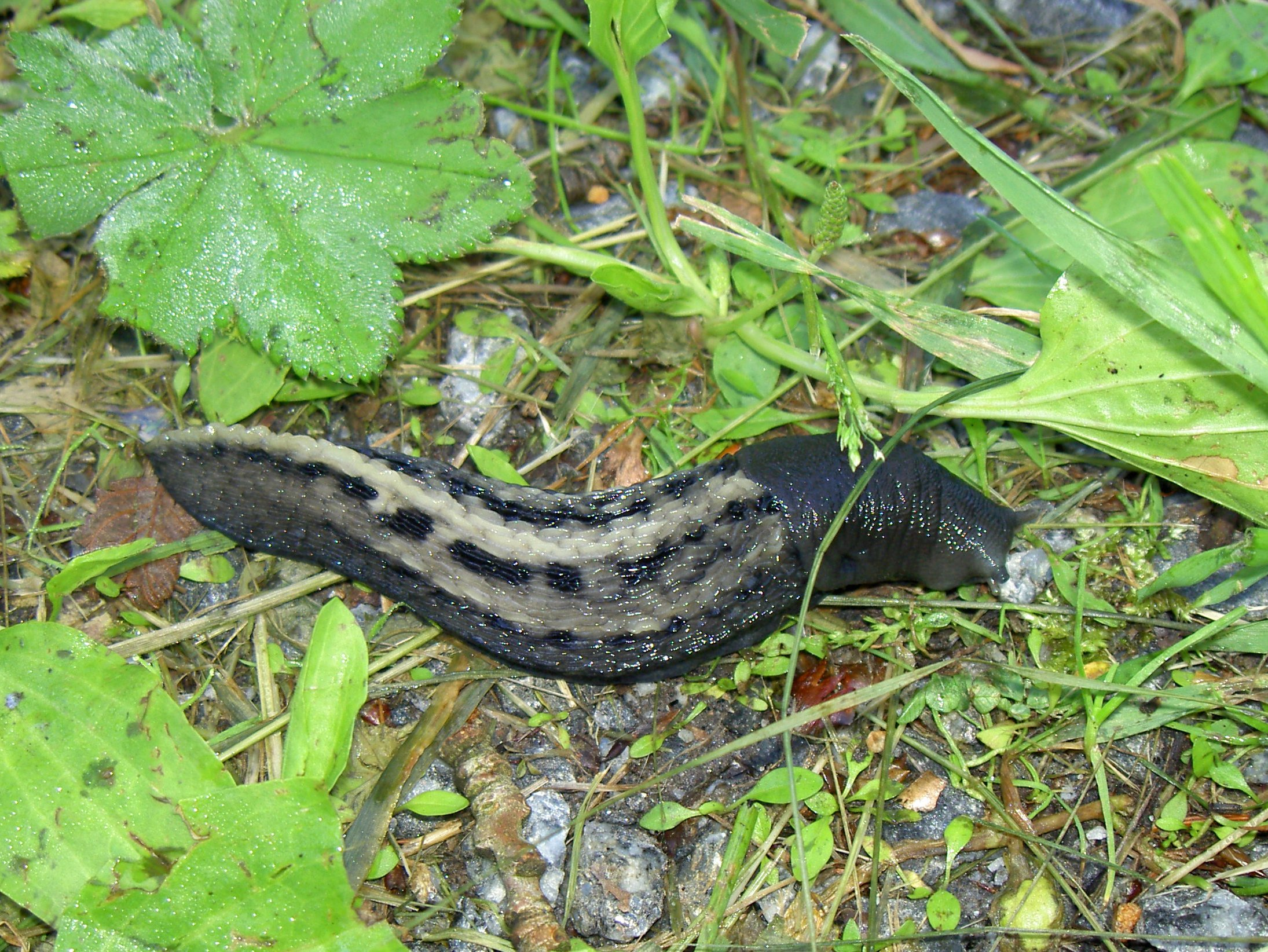
Limax cinereoniger

Limacidae – terrestrial

- Limax maximus Linnaeus, 1758
- Limax cinereoniger Wolf, 1803
- Limax cf. dacampi Menegazzi, 1854 – introduced
- Limacus flavus (Linnaeus, 1758) – introduced?
- Limacus maculatus (Kaleniczenko, 1851) – synonym: Limax ecarinatus Boettger, 1881 – introduced
- Malacolimax tenellus (O.F. Müller, 1774)
- Lehmannia marginata (O.F. Müller, 1774)
- Ambigolimax parvipenis Hutchinson, Reise & Schlitt, 2022 – introduced
- Ambigolimax valentianus (A. Férussac, 1822) – introduced

Agriolimacidae – terrestrial

- Deroceras laeve (O.F. Müller, 1774)
- Deroceras agreste (Linnaeus, 1758)
- Deroceras reticulatum (O.F. Müller, 1774)
- Deroceras panormitanum (Lessona & Pollonera, 1882) – synonym: Deroceras caruanae (Pollonera, 1891) – introduced
- Deroceras invadens Reise, Hutchinson, Schunack & Schlitt, 2011 – introduced

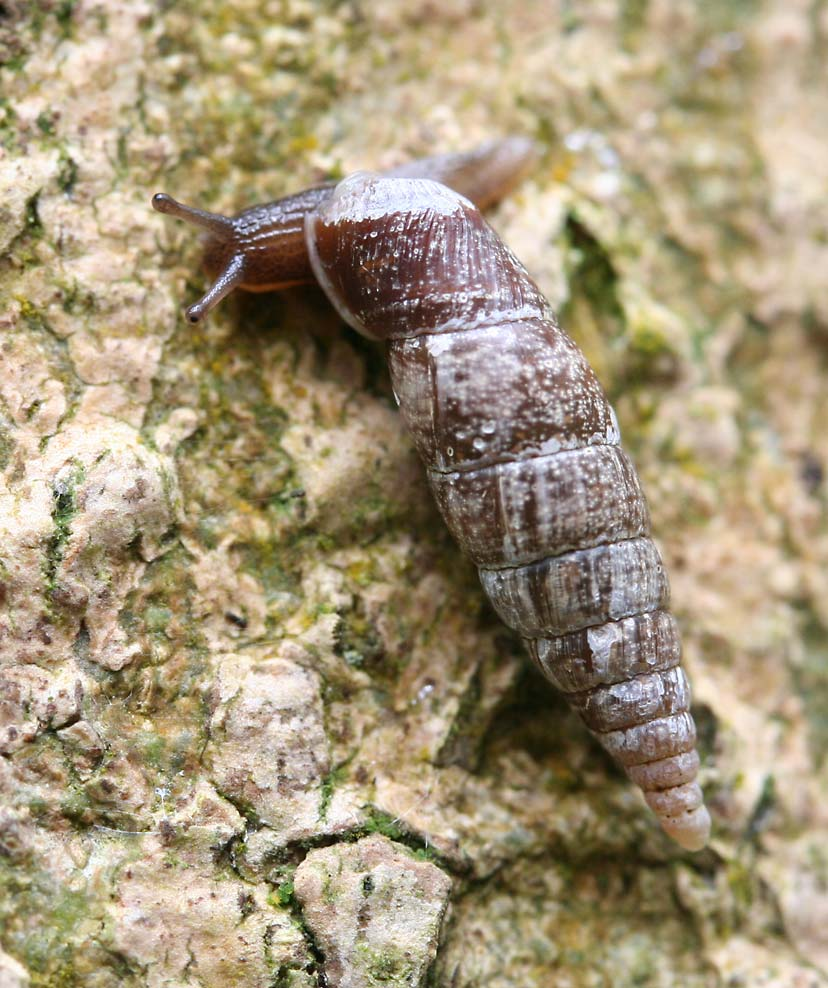
Cochlodina laminata

Ferussaciidae – terrestrial

- Cecilioides acicula (O.F. Müller, 1774) – probably introduced

Clausiliidae – terrestrial

- Alinda biplicata biplicata (Montagu, 1803) – introduced?
- Balea perversa (Linnaeus, 1758)
- Balea sarsii Pfeiffer, 1847
- Clausilia bidentata bidentata (Ström, 1765)
- Clausilia dubia dubia Draparnaud, 1805 – probably native
- Cochlodina laminata (Montagu, 1803)
- Macrogastra rolphii (Turton, 1826)
- Papillifera papillaris (O.F. Müller, 1774) – introduced

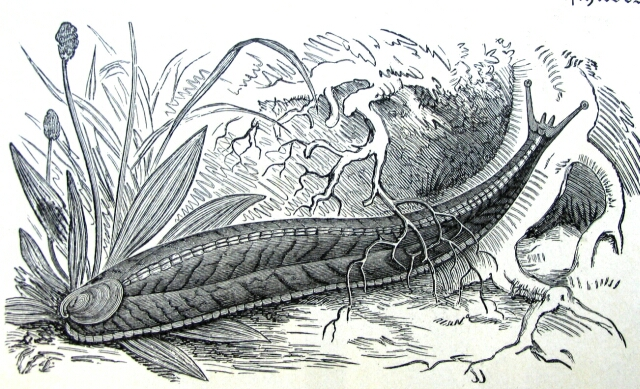
Testacella haliotidea

Testacellidae – terrestrial

- Testacella maugei A. Férussac, 1822 – introduced?
- Testacella haliotidea Draparnaud, 1801 – introduced?
- Testacella scutulum Sowerby, 1821 – introduced?
- Testacella sp. "tenuipenis" – introduced?

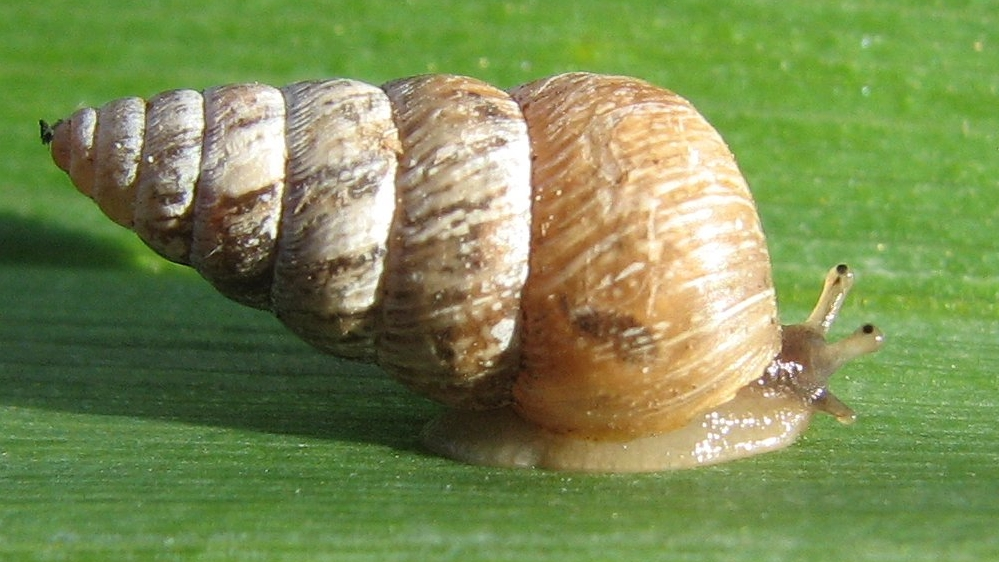
Cochlicella barbara

Helicodontidae – terrestrial

- Helicodonta obvoluta obvoluta (O.F. Müller, 1774) – probably native

Cochlicellidae – terrestrial

- Cochlicella acuta (O.F. Müller, 1774) – introduced?
- Cochlicella barbara (Linnaeus, 1758) – introduced

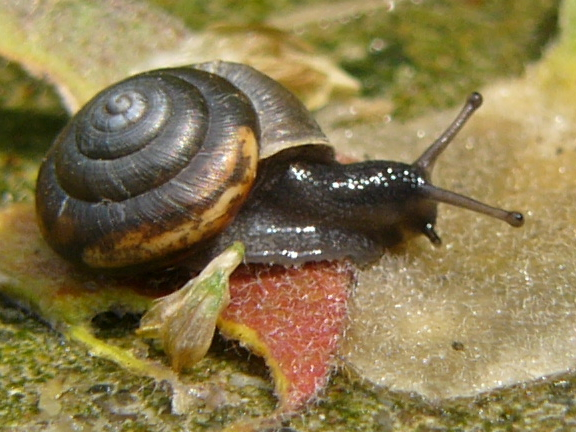
Trochulus hispidus

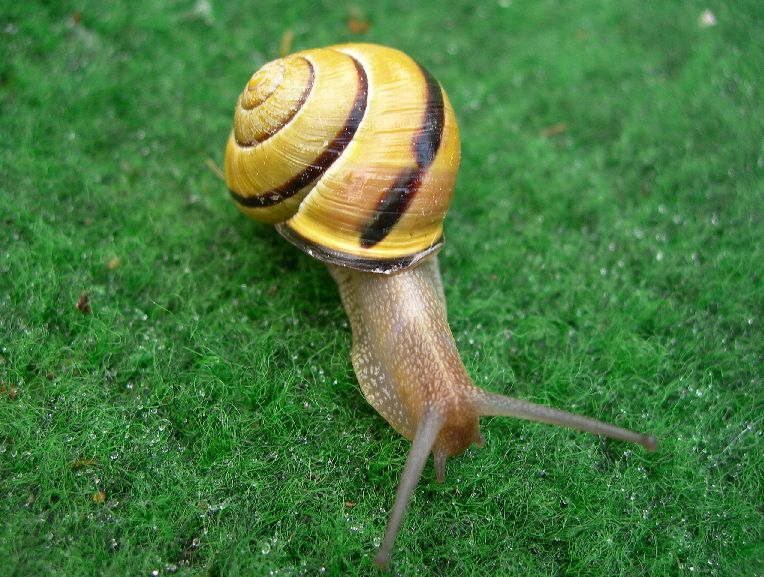
Cepaea nemoralis

Hygromiidae – terrestrial

- Ashfordia granulata (Alder, 1830) – synonym: Monacha granulata
- Candidula gigaxii (L. Pfeiffer, 1850) – introduced?
- Candidula intersecta (Poiret, 1801) – probably introduced
- Candidula olisippensis (Servain, 1880) – introduced
- Cernuella aginnica (Locard, 1894) – introduced
- Cernuella neglecta (Draparnaud, 1805) – introduced, now extinct in G.B.
- Cernuella virgata (Da Costa, 1778) – probably introduced
- Helicella itala itala (Linnaeus, 1758)
- Hygromia cinctella (Draparnaud, 1801) – introduced
- Hygromia limbata limbata (Draparnaud, 1805) – introduced
- Monacha cantiana (Montagu, 1803) – introduced
- Monacha cartusiana (O.F. Müller, 1774) – introduced?
- Monacha ocellata (Roth, 1839) – introduced
- Ponentina subvirescens (Bellamy, 1839) – probably native
- Pseudotrichia rubiginosa (Rossmässler, 1838) – probably native
- Trochoidea elegans (Gmelin, 1791) – introduced
- Trochulus hispidus (Linnaeus, 1758)
- Trochulus sericeus (Draparnaud, 1801)
- Trochulus striolatus (Pfeiffer, 1828)
- Zenobiella subrufescens (Miller, 1822)

Bradybaenidae – terrestrial

- Fruticicola fruticum (O.F. Müller, 1774) – probably introduced, now extinct in G.B.

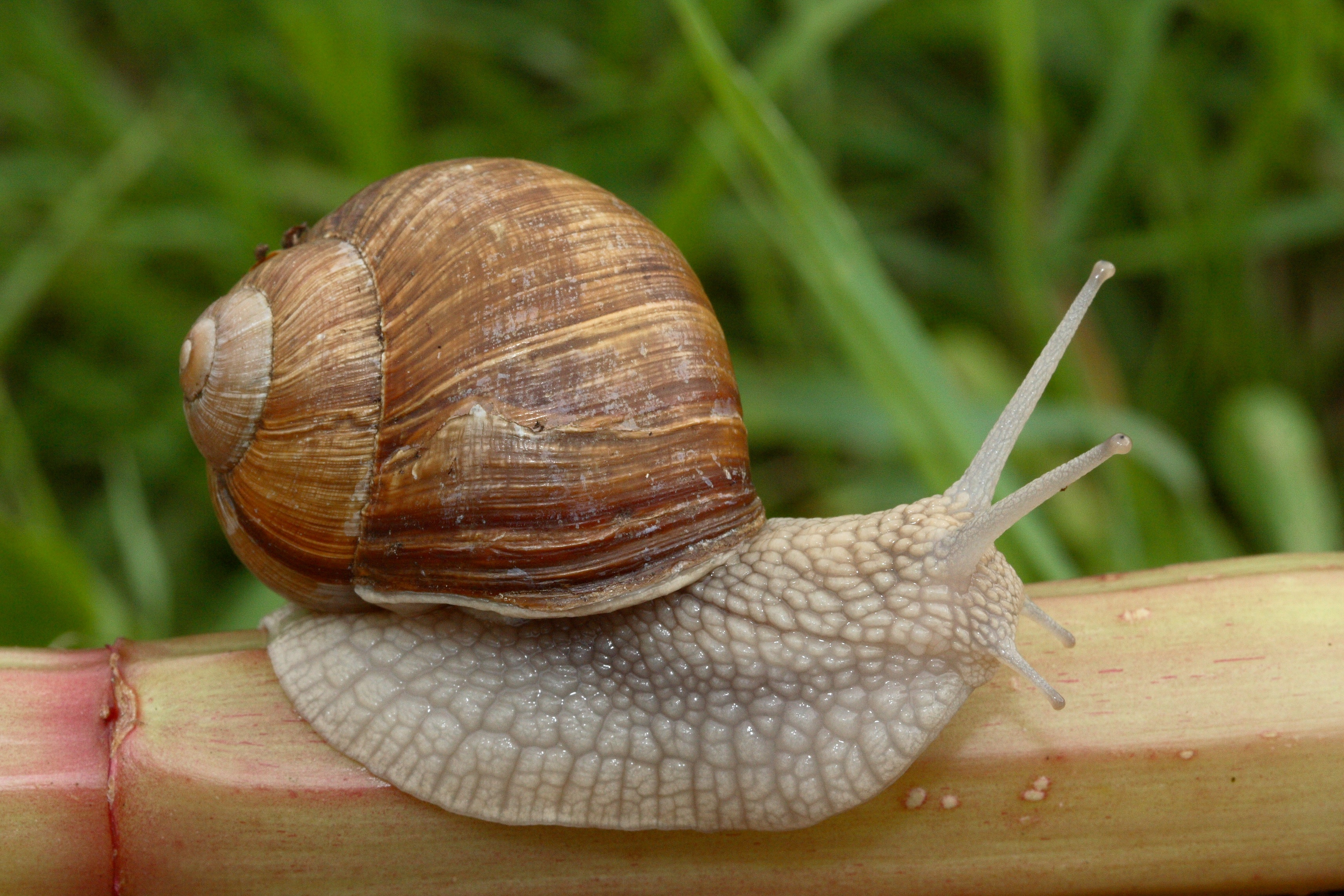
Helix pomatia

Helicidae – terrestrial

- Arianta arbustorum arbustorum (Linnaeus, 1758)
- Helicigona lapicida lapicida (Linnaeus, 1758)
- Theba pisana pisana (O.F. Müller, 1774) – introduced
- Cepaea nemoralis nemoralis (Linnaeus, 1758)
- Cepaea hortensis (O.F. Müller, 1774)
- Cornu aspersum aspersum – synonym:Helix aspersa (O.F. Müller, 1774) – introduced
- Helix lucorum Linnaeus, 1758 – introduced
- Helix pomatia Linnaeus, 1758 – introduced?

=== Bivalvia ===
Margaritiferidae – aquatic

- Margaritifera margaritifera (Linnaeus, 1758) E

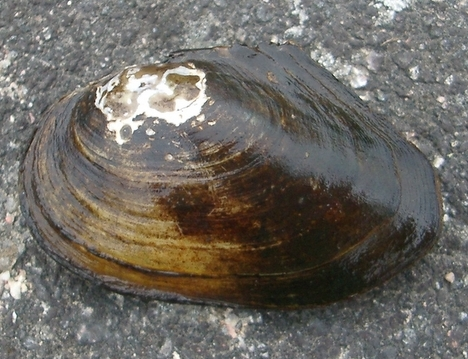
Anodonta anatina

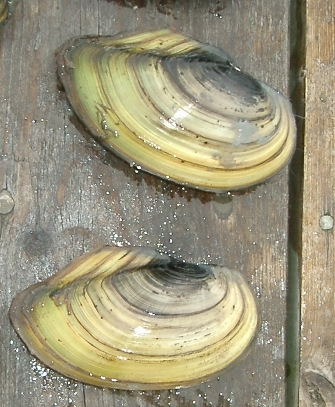
Anodonta cygnea

Unionidae – aquatic

- Unio pictorum (Linnaeus, 1758)
- Unio tumidus Philipsson, 1788
- Anodonta anatina (Linnaeus, 1758)
- Anodonta cygnea (Linnaeus, 1758)
- Pseudanodonta complanata (Rossmässler, 1835) E

Sphaeriidae – aquatic

- Sphaerium corneum (Linnaeus, 1758)
- Sphaerium rivicola (Lamarck, 1818)
- Sphaerium nucleus (Studer, 1820)
- Sphaerium solidum (Normand, 1844)
- Musculium lacustre (O.F. Müller, 1774)
- Musculium transversum (Say, 1829)
- Pisidium amnicum (O.F. Müller, 1774)
- Pisidium casertanum (Poli, 1791)
- Pisidium conventus (Clessin, 1877)
- Pisidium henslowanum (Sheppard, 1823)
- Pisidium hibernicum Westerlund, 1894
- Pisidium lilljeborgii (Clessin, 1886)
- Pisidium milium Held, 1836
- Pisidium moitessierianum Paladilhe, 1866
- Pisidium nitidum Jenyns, 1832
- Pisidium obtusale (Lamarck, 1818)

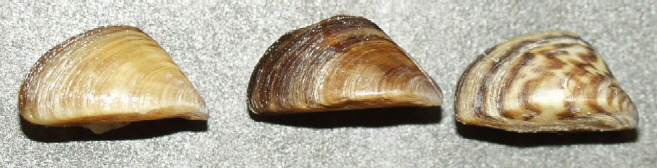
Dreissena polymorpha

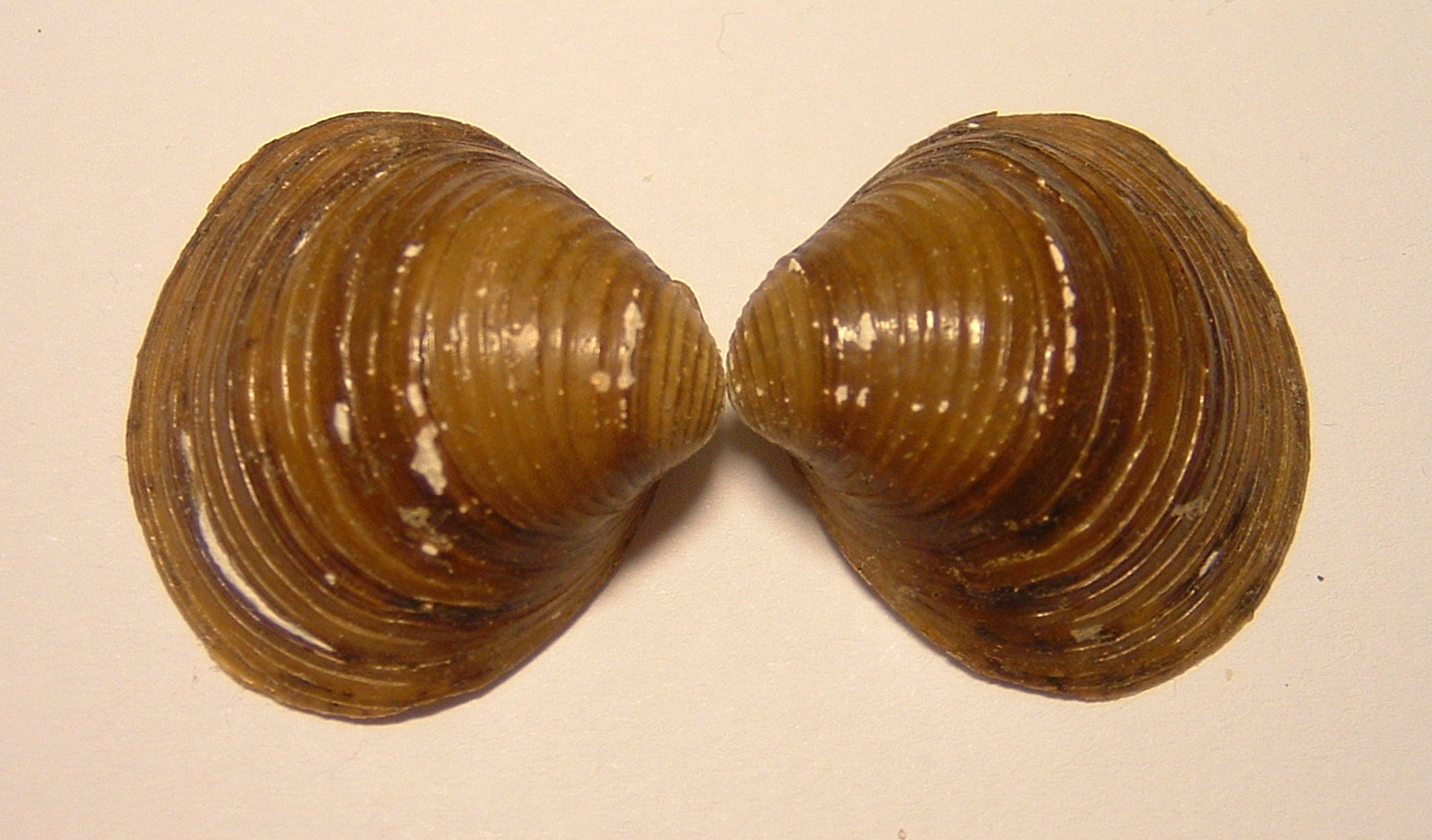
Shell of Corbicula fluminea

- Pisidium personatum Malm, 1855
- Pisidium pulchellum (Jenyns, 1832)
- Pisidium pseudosphaerium Favre, 1927
- Pisidium subtruncatum Malm, 1855
- Pisidium supinum A. Schmidt, 1851
- Pisidium tenuilineatum Stelfox, 1918 E

Dreissenidae – aquatic

- Dreissena polymorpha (Pallas, 1771) – introduced
- Dreissena bugensis (Andrusov, 1897) – introduced
- Mytilopsis leucophaeata (Conrad, 1831) – introduced

Corbiculidae – aquatic

- Corbicula fluminea (O.F. Müller, 1774) – introduced

== List of "hothouse alien" species ==
This group of exotic land and freshwater species are not truly part of the fauna because they do not live in the wild. Many are tropical and thus are incapable of surviving in the wild in Great Britain; instead they have established themselves as uninvited inhabitants of greenhouses, aquaria within greenhouses, and similar artificially-heated habitats.

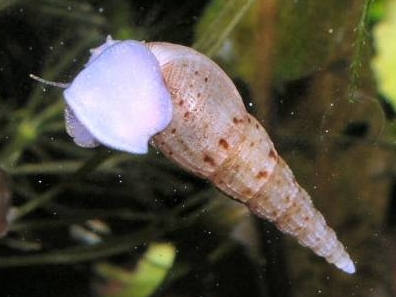
Melanoides tuberculata

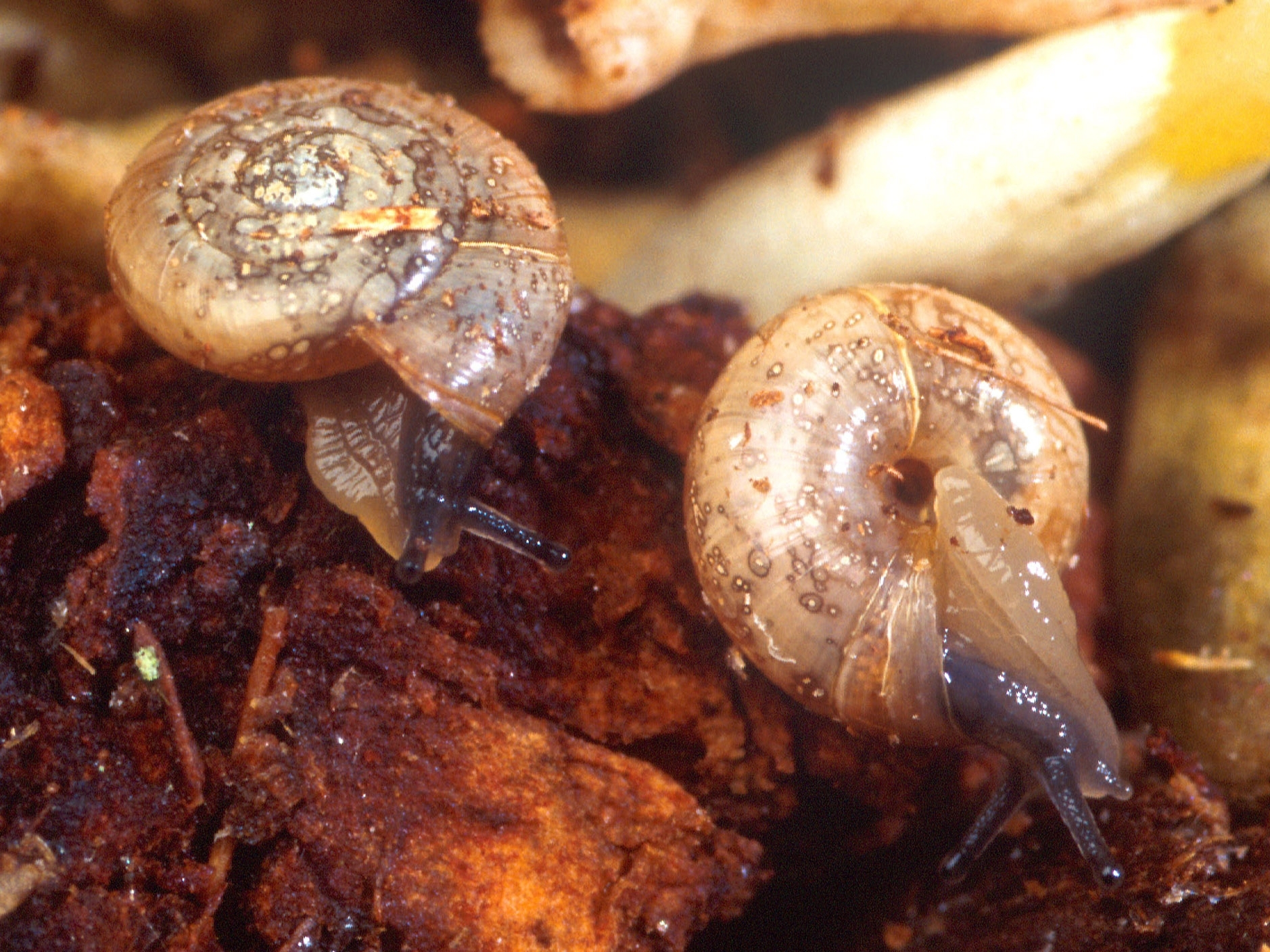
Zonitoides arboreus on orchid plants

Thiaridae – aquatic

- Melanoides tuberculata (O.F. Müller, 1774)

Gastrodontidae – terrestrial

- Zonitoides arboreus (Say, 1816)

Lymnaeidae – aquatic

- Radix rubiginosa (Michelin, 1831), native to Indo-China and Indonesia

Planorbidae – aquatic

- Gyraulis cf. chinensis (Dunker, 1848)
- Planorbella duryi (Wetherby, 1879)

Pleurodiscidae – terrestrial

- Pleurodiscus balmei (Potiez & Michaud, 1835)

Pristilomatidae – terrestrial

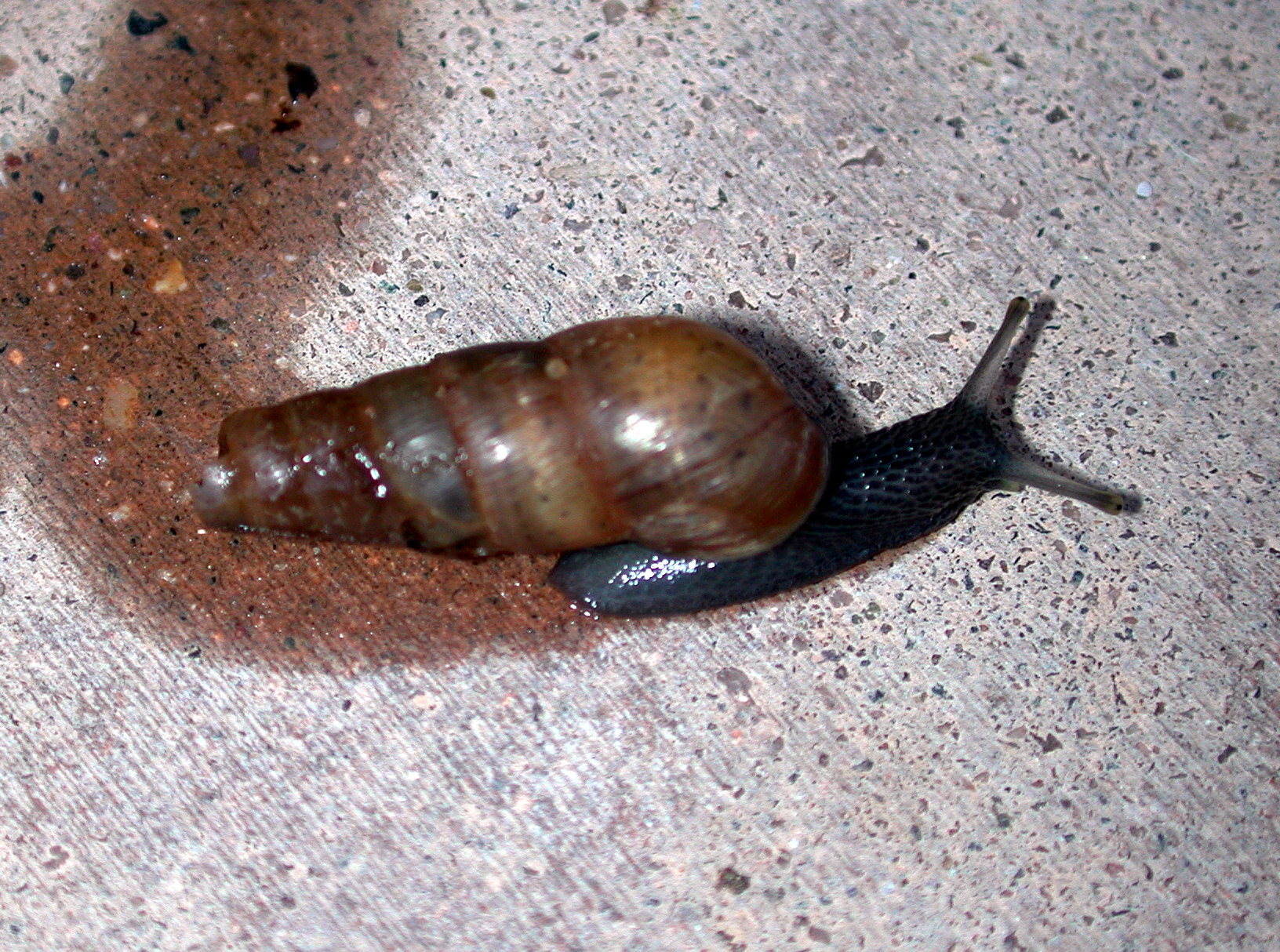
Rumina decollata

- Hawaiia minuscula (Binney, 1841)

Helicodiscidae – terrestrial

- Helicodiscus parallelus (Say, 1821)

Streptaxidae – terrestrial

- Gulella io Verdcourt, 1974

Subulinidae – terrestrial

- Allopeas clavulinum (Potiez & Michaud, 1838)
- Opeas hannense (Rang, 1831)
- Rumina decollata (Linnaeus, 1758)
- Striosubulina sp.
- Subulina octona (Bruguière, 1789)

Limacidae – terrestrial

- Ambigolimax waterstoni Hutchinson, Reise & Schlitt, 2022 – not recorded since 1930s

== See also ==
- List of endangered species in the British Isles
- Biota of the Isle of Man#Mollusca (molluscs)
- List of non-marine molluscs of Ireland
- List of non-marine molluscs of the Netherlands
- Arthur Erskine Ellis, an important 20th century author on non-marine molluscs of the UK
