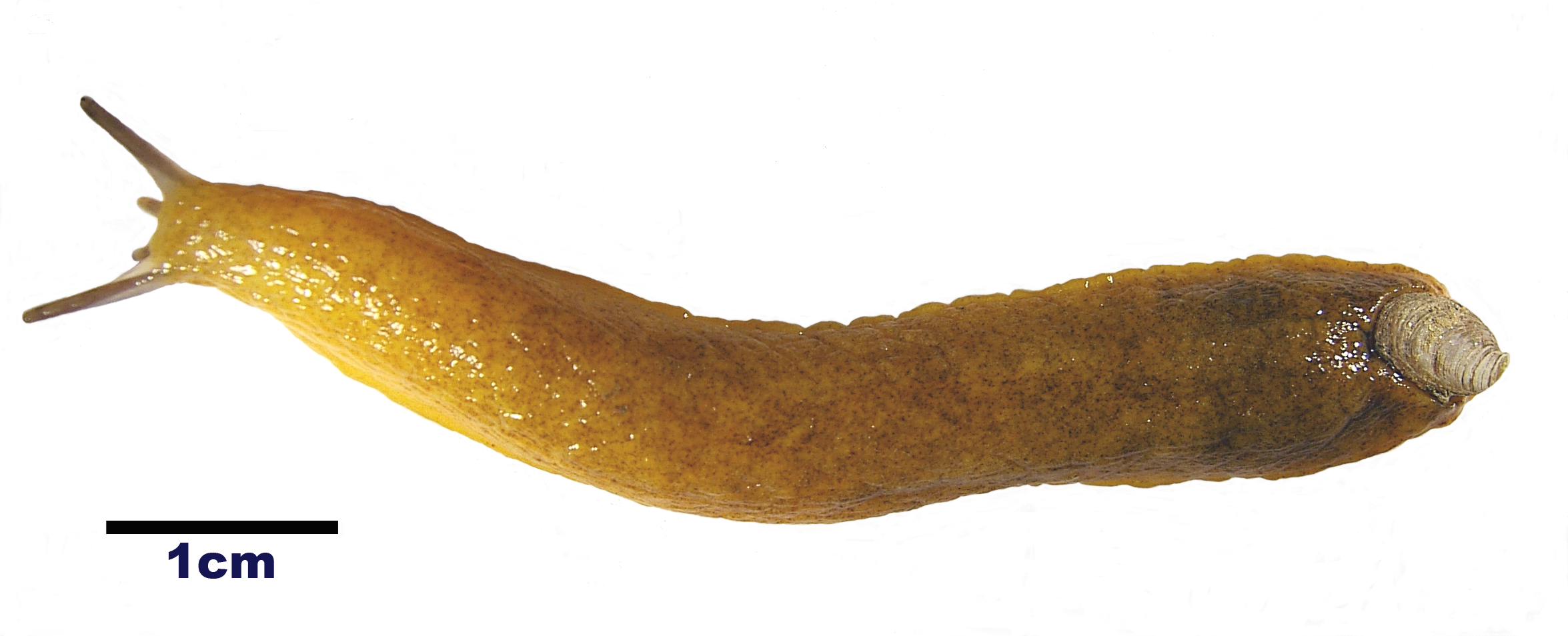
- Testscella scutulum from a garden in Scarborough, Yorkshire, England.

Scientific classification
- Kingdom: Animalia
- Phylum: Mollusca
- Class: Gastropoda
- Order: Stylommatophora
- Family: Testacellidae
- Genus: Testacella
- Species: T. scutulum

Binomial name
- Testacella scutulum G. B. Sowerby I, 1821

= Testacella scutulum =

Species of gastropod

Testacella scutulum is an air-breathing, carnivorous land slug, a terrestrial gastropod mollusk in the family Testacellidae, the shelled slugs.

Like other species in the genus, this European slug eats earthworms, spends most of its life underground, and is rarely seen.

== Distribution ==
This species is known to occur in a number of European countries and islands including:

- Great Britain
- Ireland
- Spain
- Croatia
- Italy and Sicily
- Canary Islands
- Switzerland
- and other areas

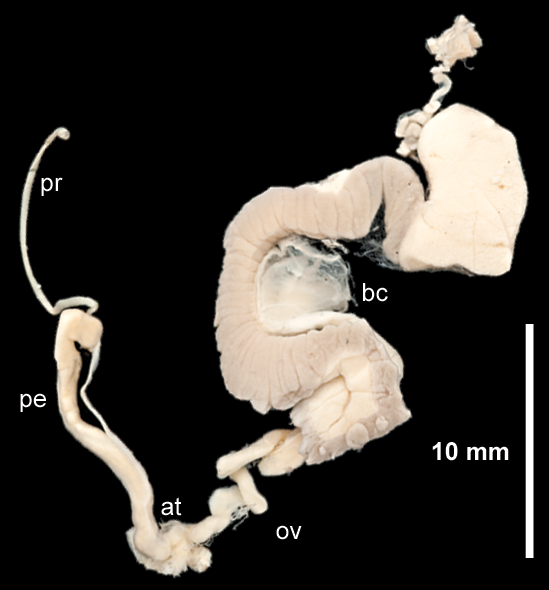
Reproductive system of Testacella scutulum: pr - penial retractor muscle; pe - penis; at - atrium; ov - oviduct; bc - bursa copulatrix.

== Description ==
This slug, like others in the family, has a small shell which is situated towards the rear of the animal. The specific name means "shield", a reference to the shape of the shell.

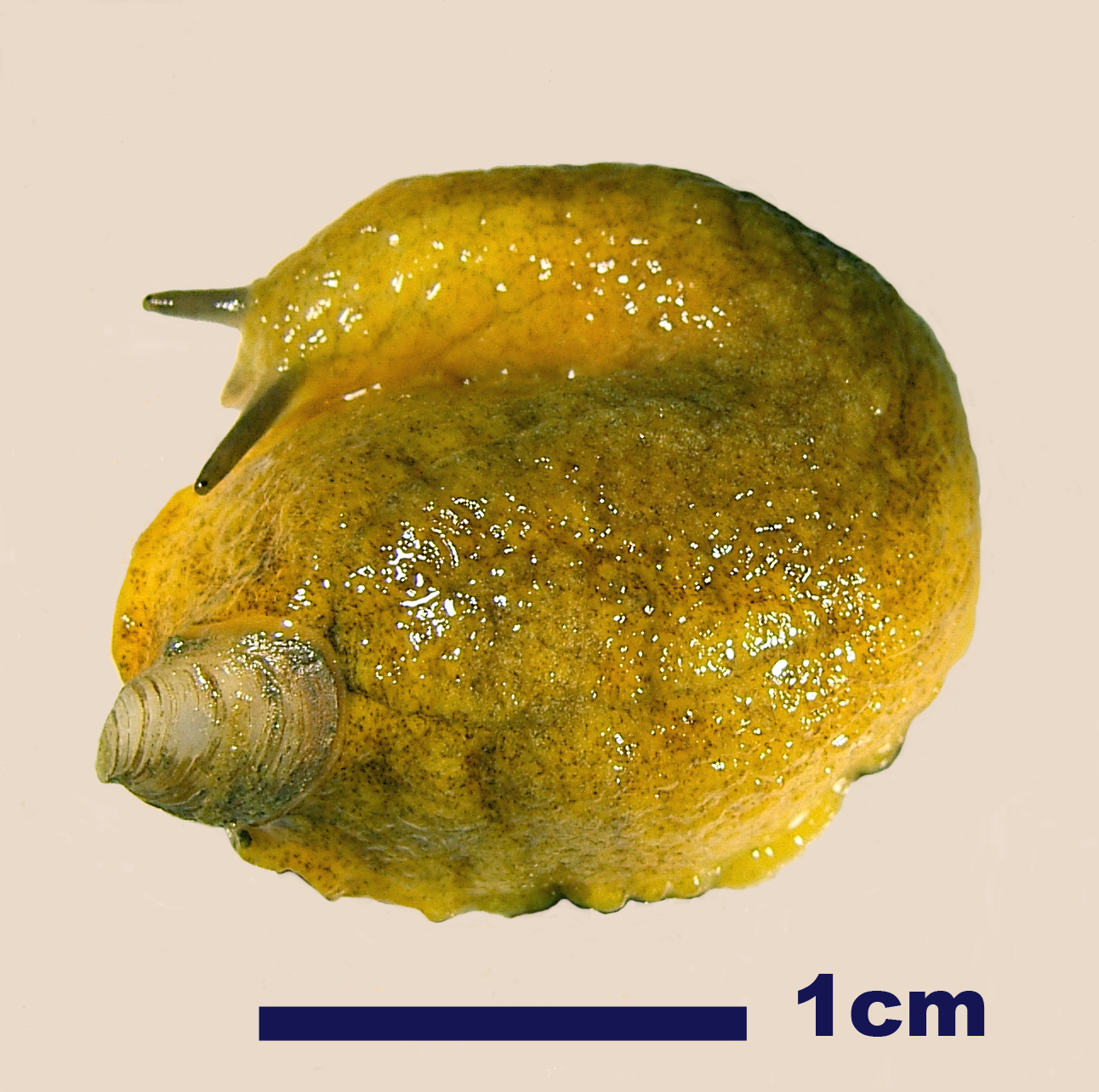
Same semislug from Scarborough. The dorsal grooves joined at the anterior margin of the shell.

The animal is yellow with black or brown spots. The foot fringe and sole are usually orange. Thelateral grooves join before reaching their common origin at the front edge of themantle. The shell is narrower than in Testacella haliotidea and nearly triangular; flattened, sometimes concave, outer margin of the aperture sharply truncate and without angle at the columella. Size:Animal 8–12 cm long, shell 6-7 (length) x 3.5-4.5 (width) mm
