= Rumina (disambiguation) =

Rumina may refer to:

== People ==
- Miranda Rumina, a Slovenian artist
- Rumina, Bulgarian pop-folk singer known for the songs "Zhestoko" and "Neka Opoznaya"
- Rumina Sato, a Japanese martial artist

== In mythology ==
- Rumina, a Roman goddess

== In fiction ==
- Rumina, primary antagonist in the TV series The Adventures of Sinbad

== In biology ==
- Rumina (gastropod), a genus of snails
- Zerynthia rumina, a species of butterfly
- Plural of rumen, first chamber of alimentary canal of ruminant

== Other ==
- 145451 Rumina, a trans-Neptunian object
