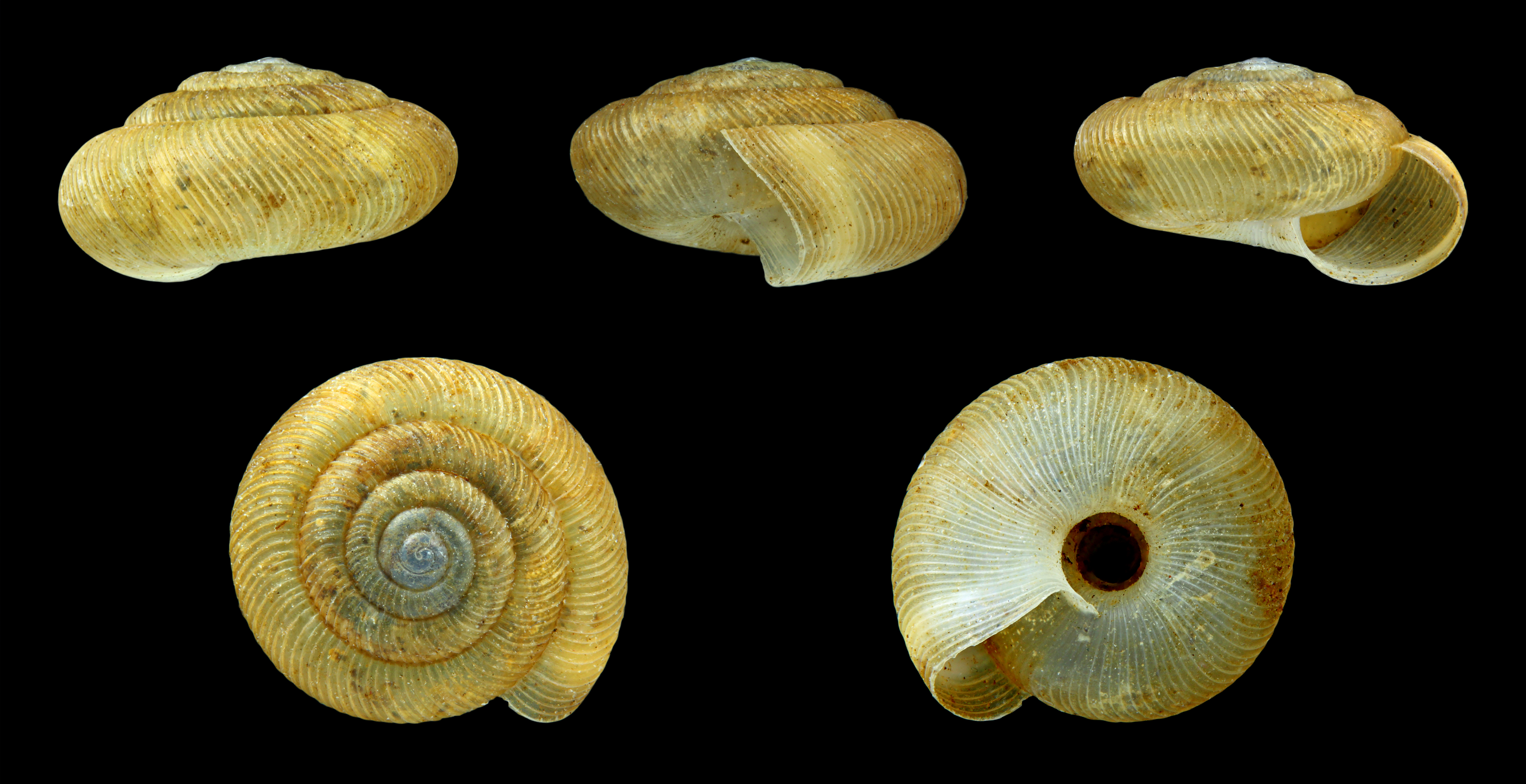
- Five views of a shell of Pleurodiscus balmei

Scientific classification
- Kingdom: Animalia
- Phylum: Mollusca
- Class: Gastropoda
- Order: Stylommatophora
- Family: Pleurodiscidae
- Genus: Pleurodiscus
- Species: P. balmei

Binomial name
- Pleurodiscus balmei (Potiez & Michaud, 1838)

Synonyms
- Helix balmei Potiez & Michaud, 1838

= Pleurodiscus balmei =

Species of gastropod

Pleurodiscus balmei is a Mediterranean European species of air-breathing land snail, a terrestrial pulmonate gastropod mollusc in the family Pleurodiscidae.

== Distribution ==
This species is known to occur in a number of countries and islands including:

- Italy
- Sicily
- Malta
- Turkey
- Greece
- Syria
- Israel
- Tunisia
- Algeria

It was introduced to southeastern Australia.

This snail also occurs as a "hothouse alien" in:

- Great Britain
- and other areas
