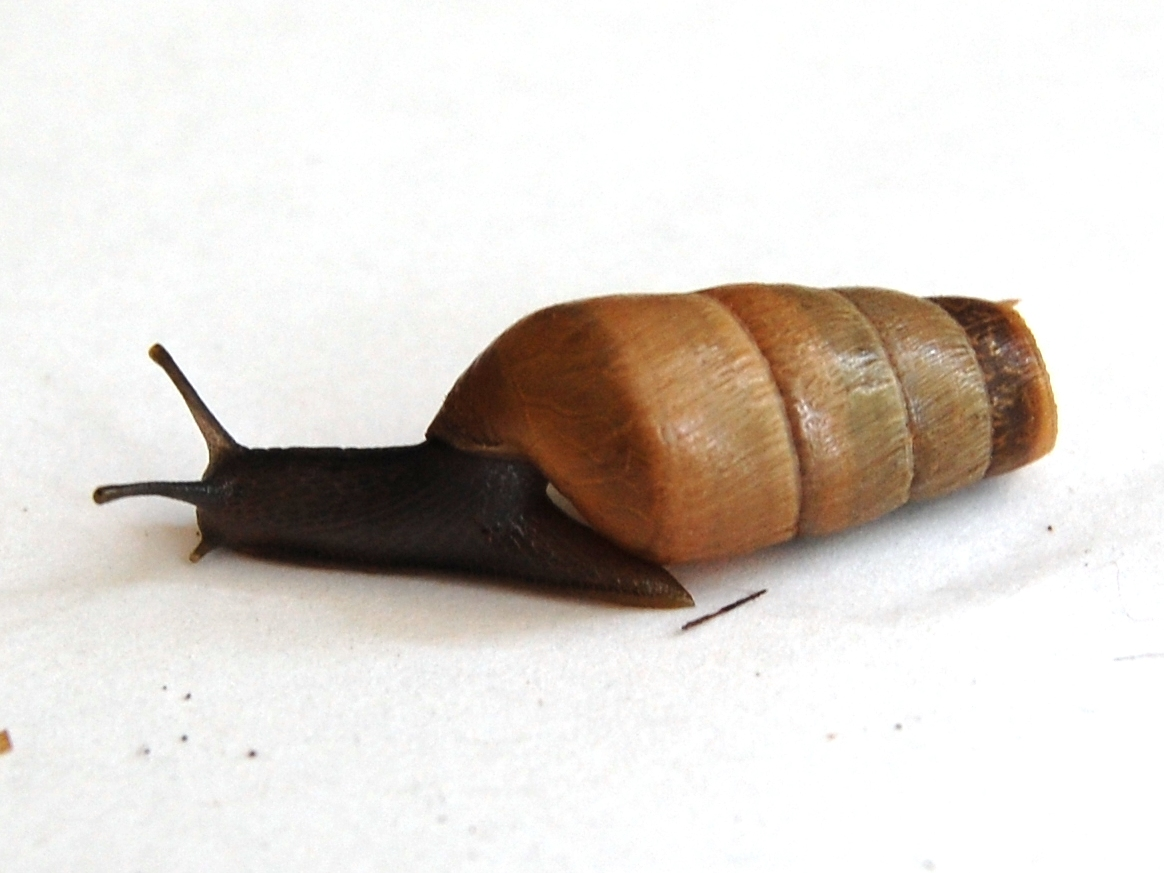
- A live individual of the decollate snail

Conservation status
- Least Concern (IUCN 3.1)

- Secure (NatureServe)

Scientific classification
- Kingdom: Animalia
- Phylum: Mollusca
- Class: Gastropoda
- Order: Stylommatophora
- Family: Achatinidae
- Subfamily: Rumininae
- Genus: Rumina
- Species: R. decollata

Binomial name
- Rumina decollata (Linnaeus, 1758)

Synonyms
- Bulimus bavouxi Coquand, 1862 (junior subjective synonym); Bulimus decollatus Draparaud, 1805; Helix decollata Linnaeus, 1758; Orbitina incomparabilis (Germain, 1930); Orbitina truncatella (Germain, 1930); Rumina decollata cylindrica; Rumina paivae (Lowe, 1861); Stenogyra (Rumina) decollata (Linnaeus, 1758) (superseded combination); Stenogyra bavouxi (Coquand, 1862) (junior subjective synonym); Stenogyra decollata (Linnaeus, 1758) (unaccepted combination)

= Decollate snail =

Species of gastropod

The decollate snail (Rumina decollata) is a medium-sized predatory land snail, a species of terrestrial pulmonate gastropod mollusk in the family Achatinidae. It originated in the Mediterranean but has been introduced in a number of areas worldwide. It was recently found to represent a species complex.

== Varieties ==
- Rumina decollata var. cruda Monterosato, 1892
- Rumina decollata var. cylindrica Monterosato, 1892
- Rumina decollata var. dentata Pallary, 1922
- Rumina decollata var. fusca Pallary, 1899
- Rumina decollata var. maura Crosse, 1873
- Rumina decollata var. pellucida Monterosato, 1892
- Rumina decollata var. solida Monterosato, 1892
- Rumina decollata var. striatula Pallary, 1920

== Distribution ==
This species is native to the Mediterranean excluding south-east Mediterranean.

Over the last century its presence has been reported in China and found in large quantities.

It is introduced in Israel and in Egypt since Roman times. It has been introduced into North America, including Fresno, California, Phoenix & Glendale, Arizona and other areas as a biological control agent, in hopes of controlling populations of the brown garden snail. It has also been found in southern Brazil, and in Great Britain, as a "hothouse alien".

== Shell description ==
The shell of the decollate snail is long and roughly cone-shaped. It grows to approximately 40–45 mm (1.6–1.8 in) in length and a width of 14 mm (0.55 in), and upon reaching mature size, grinds or chips off the end of its own shell by moving its body roughly against hard surfaces, so that the shell takes on a decollate shape, tapering to a blunt end.

== Life habits ==
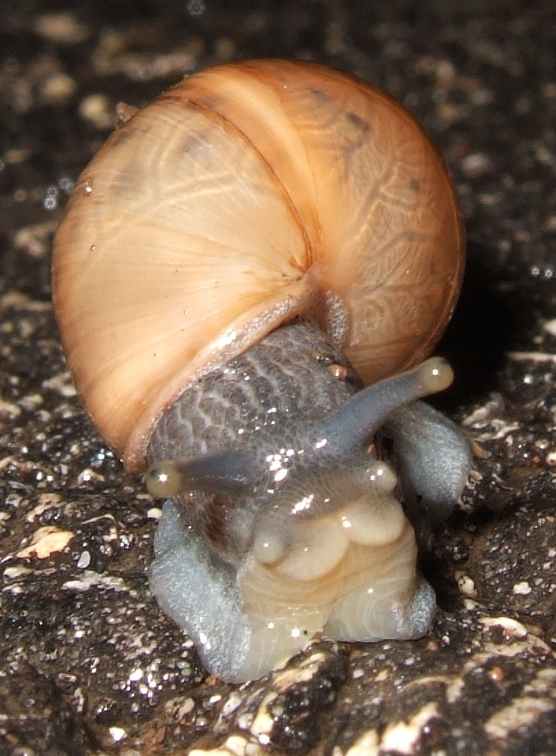
Front view from Austin, Texas

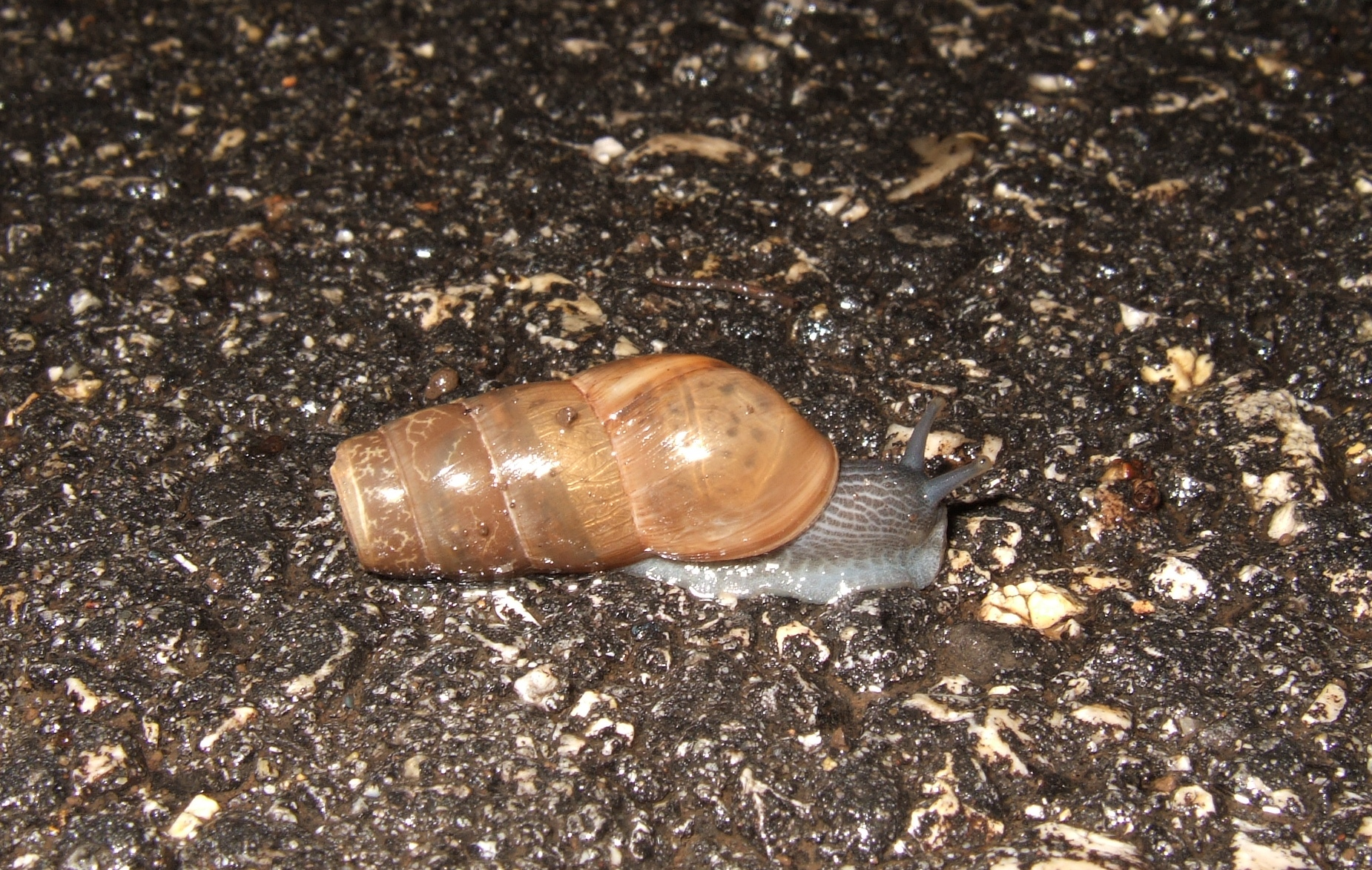
Lateral view

Sexual maturity occurs at approximately 10 months. An adult is capable of laying 500 eggs in its lifetime. The eggs are deposited singly in the soil and hatch within 10–45 days.

Rumina decollata is a voracious predator, and will readily feed upon common garden snails and slugs and their eggs. The snail eats plant matter as well, but this generalist predator is indiscriminate in its feeding and has been implicated in the decimation of native gastropods (including non-pest species) and beneficial annelids.

Decollate snails are tolerant of dry and cold conditions, during which they burrow deep into the soil. They are most active during the night and during rainfall.
