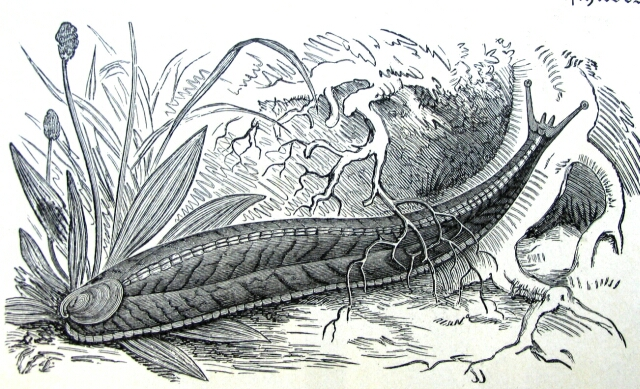
- Shelled Slug, Testacella haliotidea

Scientific classification
- Kingdom: Animalia
- Phylum: Mollusca
- Class: Gastropoda
- Order: Stylommatophora
- Family: Testacellidae; J. E. Gray, 1840
- Genus: Testacella; Draparnaud, 1801

Type species
- Testacella haliotidea Draparnaud, 1801

Synonyms
- Testacella (Testacella) Lamarck, 1801 · alternate representation; Testacella (Testacelloides) A. J. Wagner, 1914 · alternate representation; Testacellus Montfort, 1810

= Testacella =

Testacella Temporal range: Lutetian-Recent

Genus of gastropods

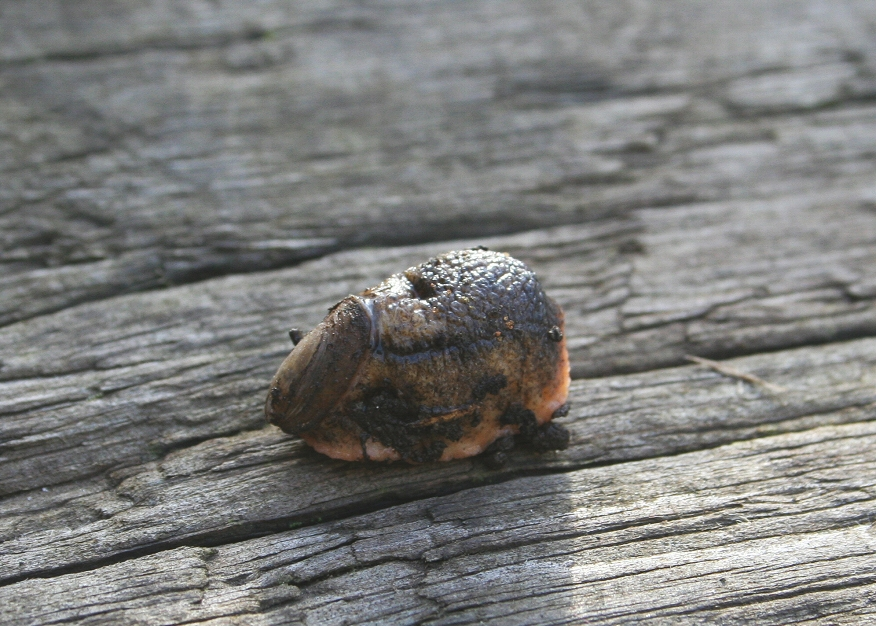
Testacella maugei in the contracted state

Testacella is genus of small to medium-large, predatory, air-breathing, land slugs. It is the only genus in the family Testacellidae. They are not often seen because they live underground.

== Distribution ==
Species within this genus of slugs live in north Africa, southern and western Europe, and Britain.

== Species ==
Species within the genus Testacella include:

- Subgenus Testacella Draparnaud, 1801
- Subgenus Testacelloides A. J. Wagner, 1914
- † Testacella asinium Serres, 1827
- Testacella bisulcata Risso, 1826
- Testacella bracciai Nardi & Bodon, 2011
- † Testacella bruntoniana Serres, 1851
- † Testacella deshayesii Michaud, 1855
- Testacella fischeriana Bourguignat, 1862
- Testacella gestroi Issel, 1873
- Testacella haliotidea Lamarck, 1801 - the shelled slug, the type species of the genus
- † Testacella lartetii Dupuy, 1850
- Testacella maugei Férussac, 1819
- † Testacella pedemontana Sacco, 1886
- † Testacella pontileviensis de Morgan, 1920
- † Testacella puisseguri Schlickum, 1967
- Testacella riedeli Giusti, Manganelli & Schembri, 1995
- † Testacella sandbergeri Wenz, 1914
- † Testacella schuetti Schlickum, 1967
- Testacella scutulum Sowerby I, 1821
- † Testacella zellii Klein, 1853

Nomen dubium

- Testacella antillarum Grateloup, 1855

Synonyms

- Testacella anomala Torres Minquez, 1924: synonym of Testacella haliotidea Draparnaud, 1801
- Testacella barcinonensis Pollonera, 1888: synonym of Testacella haliotidea Draparnaud, 1801
- Testacella catalonica Pollonera, 1888: synonym of Testacella scutulum G. B. Sowerby I, 1821 (original name)
- Testacella dikrangensis Godwin-Austen, 1876: synonym of Girasia dikrangensis (Godwin-Austen, 1876) (original combination)
- Testacella dubia Pollonera, 1888: synonym of Testacella haliotidea Draparnaud, 1801
- Testacella esserana Fagot, 1892: synonym of Testacella haliotidea Draparnaud, 1801
- Testacella europaea de Roissy, 1805: synonym of Testacella haliotidea Draparnaud, 1801
- Testacella galliae Oken, 1816: synonym of Testacella haliotidea Draparnaud, 1801
- Testacella guadeloupensis Lesson, 1838: synonym of Omalonyx unguis (d'Orbigny, 1836) (junior synonym)
- † Testacella larteti Dupuy, 1850 : synonym of † Testacella lartetii Dupuy, 1850 (incorrect subsequent spelling)
- Testacella matheronii Potiez & Michaud, 1838: synonym of Omalonyx unguis (d'Orbigny, 1836) (junior synonym)
- Testacella subtrigona Pollonera, 1888: synonym of Testacella haliotidea Draparnaud, 1801(original name)
- Testacella vagans F. W. Hutton, 1882: synonym of Testacella maugei Férussac, 1819

== Description ==
These slugs have a very small, ear-shaped shell, which is situated far back on their bodies.

In the family Testacellidae, the number of haploid chromosomes lies between 31 and 35.

== Habitat ==
These slugs are rarely observed, but they tend to live in gardens and farms where there is rich soil and a lot of earthworms.

== Life habits ==
These slugs live underground and hunt earthworms. They are usually only seen when they are forced up to the surface because the soil has become completely saturated with rain.

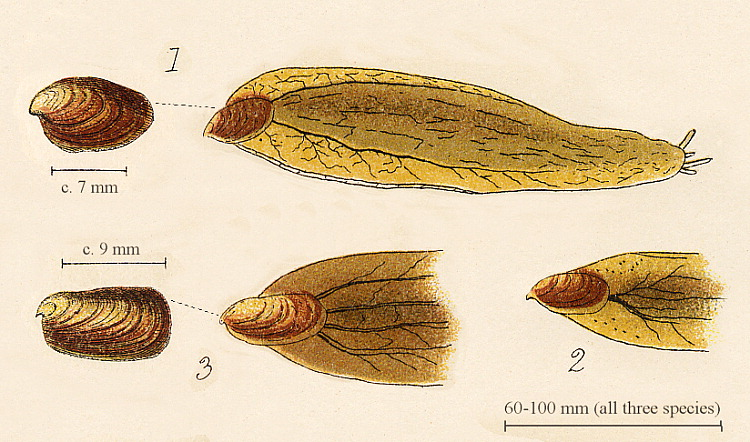
Drawing from 1896 showing the three species of Testacella found in Great Britain 1 - Testacella haliotidea 2 - Testacella scutulum 3 - Testacella maugei
