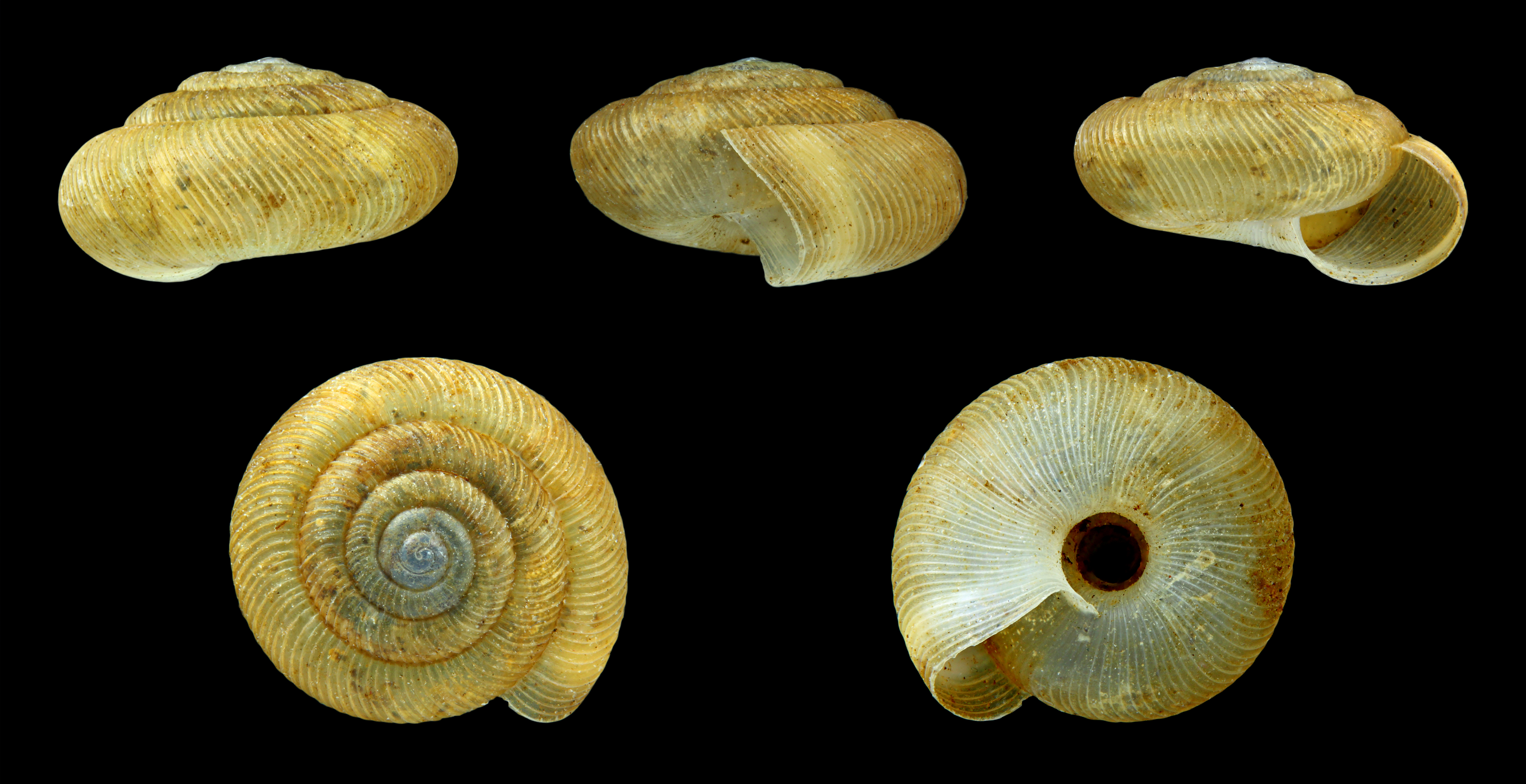
- A shell of Pleurodiscus balmei

Scientific classification
- Kingdom: Animalia
- Phylum: Mollusca
- Class: Gastropoda
- Order: Stylommatophora
- Suborder: Helicina
- Infraorder: Pupilloidei
- Superfamily: Pupilloidea
- Family: Pleurodiscidae; Wenz, 1923
- Genus: Pleurodiscus; Wenz, 1919

Species
- See text

= Pleurodiscus =

Genus of gastropods

Pleurodiscus is a genus of air-breathing land snails, terrestrial pulmonate gastropod mollusks in the superfamily Pupilloidea.

Pleurodiscus is the only genus in the family Pleurodiscidae.

== Species ==
Species within the genus Pleurodiscus include:

- Pleurodiscus balmei (Potiez & Michaud, 1835) - the type species of the genus
- Pleurodiscus astericus Bank & Menkhorst, 1991
- Pleurodiscus cyprius (Kobelt, 1896)
- Pleurodiscus sudensis (Pfeiffer, 1846)
