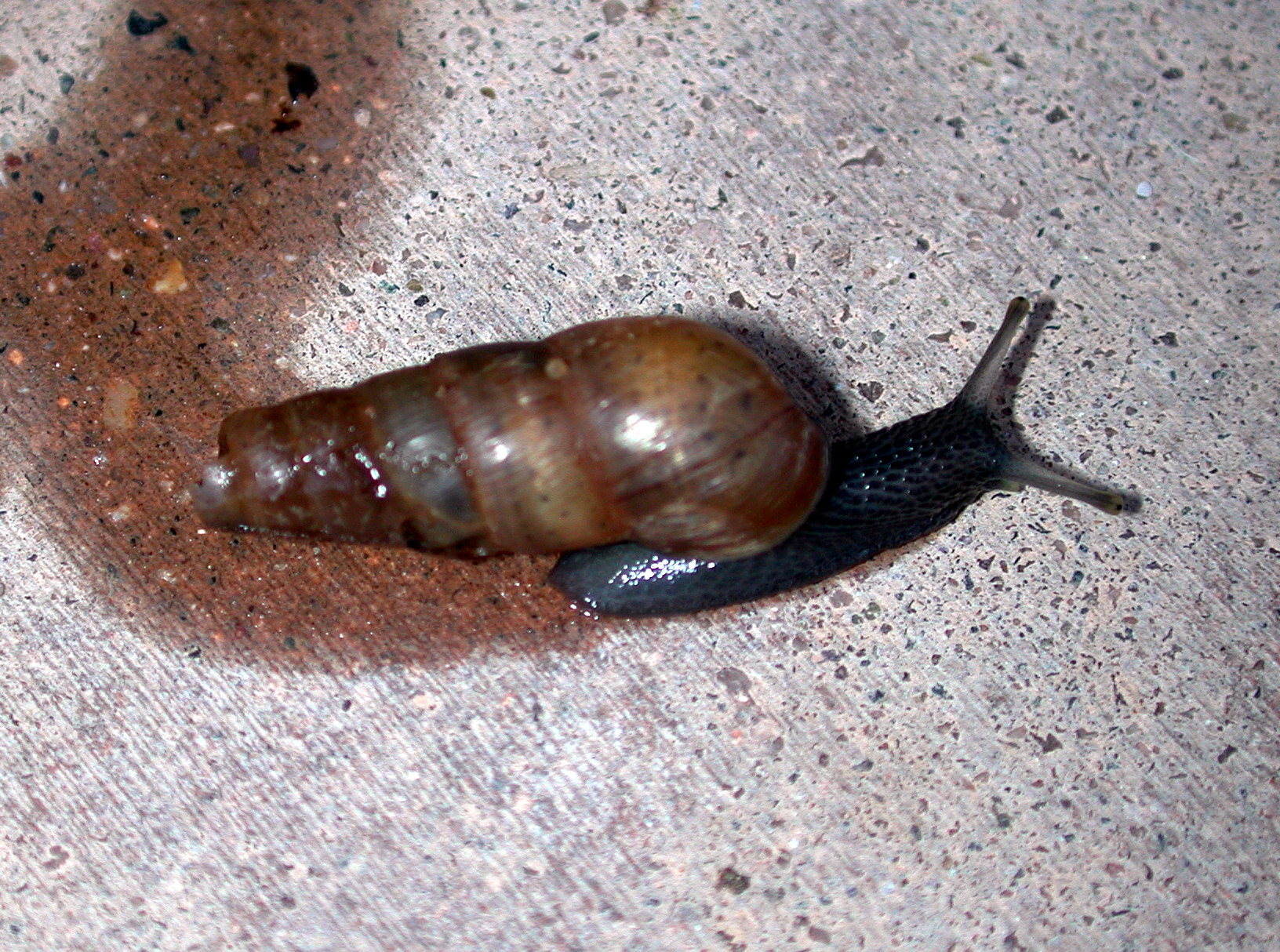
- Rumina decollata (Linnaeus, 1758)

Scientific classification
- Kingdom: Animalia
- Phylum: Mollusca
- Class: Gastropoda
- Order: Stylommatophora
- Superfamily: Achatinoidea
- Family: Achatinidae
- Subfamily: Rumininae
- Genus: Rumina; Risso, 1826

Synonyms
- Bumina Mabille, 1897; Cylindrina Schlüter, 1838; Helix (Cochliclona) Jan 1830 (junior synonym); Orbitina Risso, 1826; Remina; Ruminia [sic] (misspelling); Runina Ancey, 1887; Sira A. Schmidt, 1855; Stenogyra (Rumina) Risso, 1826 (superseded combination)

= Rumina (gastropod) =

Genus of gastropods

Rumina is a genus of medium-sized predatory land snails, terrestrial pulmonate gastropod mollusks in the family Achatinidae.

Rumina is the type genus of the subfamily Rumininae.

== Species ==
Species in the genus Rumina include:

- Rumina decollata (Linnaeus, 1758) — Decollate snail
- Rumina iamonae Quintana, 2017
- Rumina saharica (Pallary, 1901)

Rumina decollata was found to represent a species complex.

Synonyms

- Rumina chion (L. Pfeiffer, 1857): synonym of Zootecus chion (L. Pfeiffer, 1857) (superseded combination)
- Rumina polygyrata (Reeve, 1849): synonym of Zootecus polygyratus (Reeve, 1849) (superseded combination)
- Rumina pulla (J. E. Gray, 1834): synonym of Zootecus pullus (J. E. Gray, 1834) (superseded combination)
- Rumina pusilla H. Adams, 1867: synonym of Obeliscus pusillus (H. Adams, 1867) (original combination)
