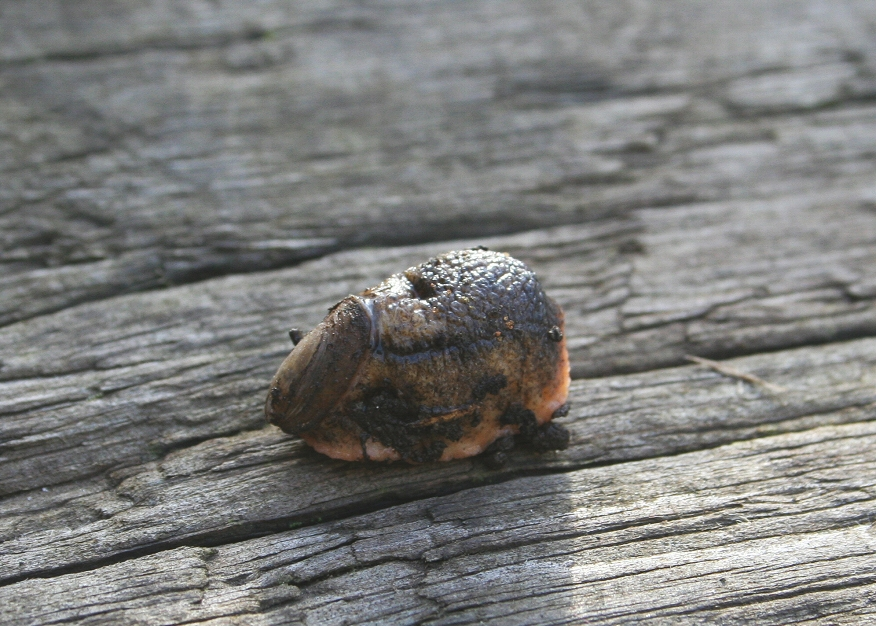
- Testacella maugei in the contracted state. The small shell of the animal is visible on the posterior end, here on the left.

Scientific classification
- Kingdom: Animalia
- Phylum: Mollusca
- Class: Gastropoda
- Order: Stylommatophora
- Family: Testacellidae
- Genus: Testacella
- Species: T. maugei

Binomial name
- Testacella maugei Férussac, 1819.

= Testacella maugei =

Species of gastropod

Testacella maugei is a species of air-breathing, carnivorous land slug, a terrestrial gastropod mollusc in the family Testacellidae, the shelled slugs.

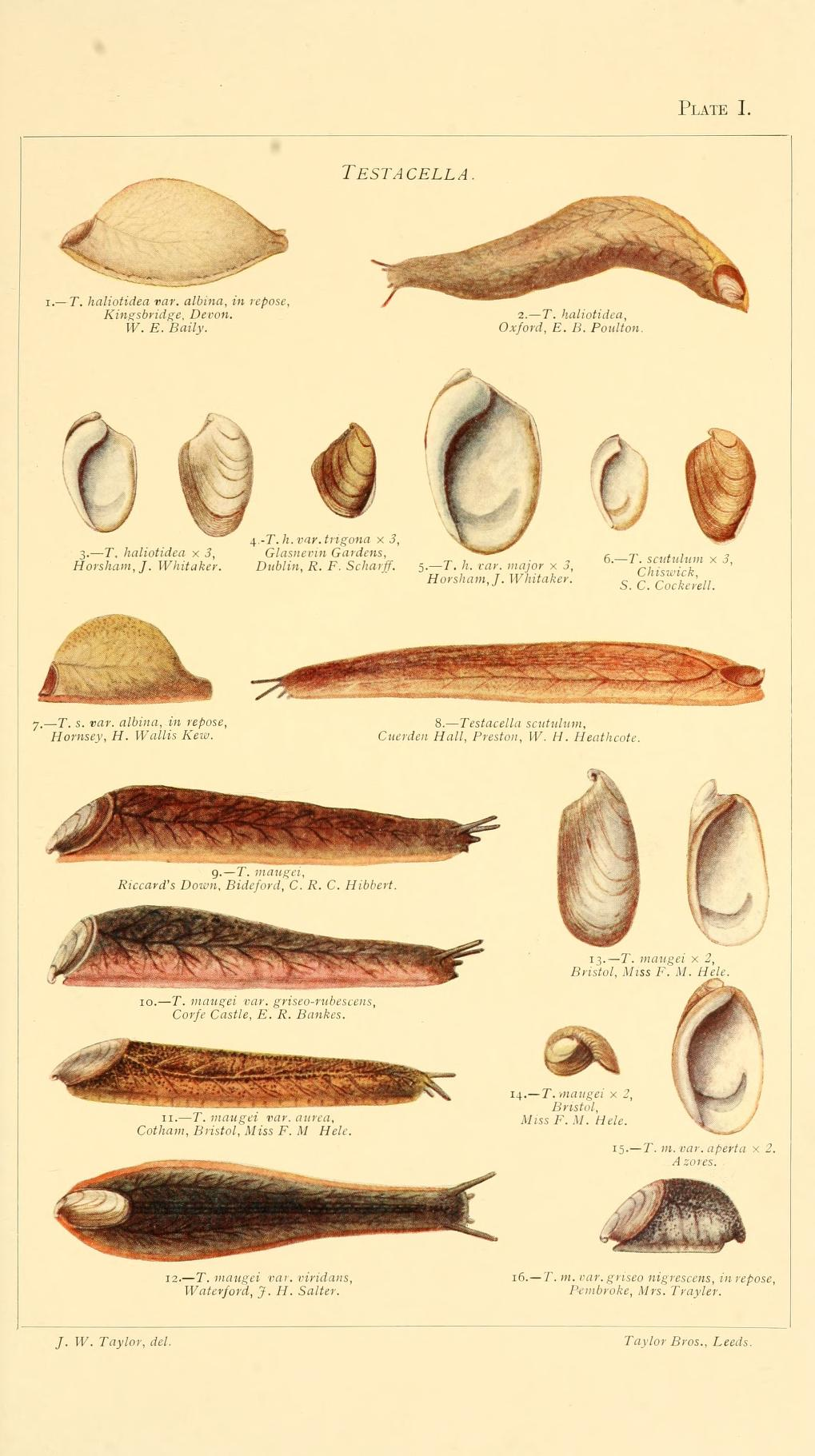
Testacella haliotidea, Testacella scutulum and Testacella maugei Plate from John W. Taylor Monograph of the land & freshwater Mollusca of the British Isles

== Description ==
The back and sides of this slug are brownish and darker, with some brown and yellowish spots. Near the foot the body is yellowish, with a greenish or orange hue. The shape of the body is somewhat conical when crawling (the anterior part being wider than the posterior part, and the posterior part is truncated). The points of origin of the lateral grooves are about 5 mm apart at the mantle; they are not joined. The sole is yellowish. The shell rudiment is located on the posterior section of the dorsum. It is almost parallel-sided and large, with its apex pointing downwards, and the basal end of the aperture pointing upwards. The shell is greenish or brownish with two whorls and a keeled suture. Animal 6–12 cm, shell 13-17 x 7-11 x 3.5-3.5 (height) mm.

== Distribution ==
Morocco (Atlantic coast) Azores, Madeira, Canary Islands, Portugal, Spain, Channel Islands, France (Atlantic coast) and the British Isles (Britain and Ireland)
