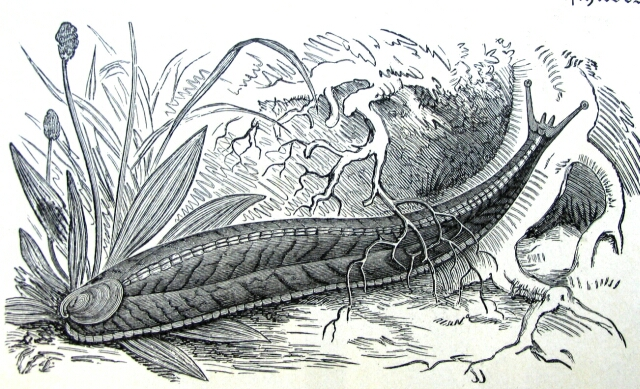
- Drawing of the shelled slug, Testacella haliotidea

Conservation status
- Least Concern (IUCN 3.1)

- Secure (NatureServe)

Scientific classification
- Kingdom: Animalia
- Phylum: Mollusca
- Class: Gastropoda
- Order: Stylommatophora
- Family: Testacellidae
- Genus: Testacella
- Species: T. haliotidea

Binomial name
- Testacella haliotidea Lamarck, 1801

= Shelled slug =

Species of mollusc

The shelled slug, scientific name Testacella haliotidea, is a rarely seen, air-breathing, carnivorous land slug, a terrestrial gastropod mollusk in the family Testacellidae, the shelled slugs.

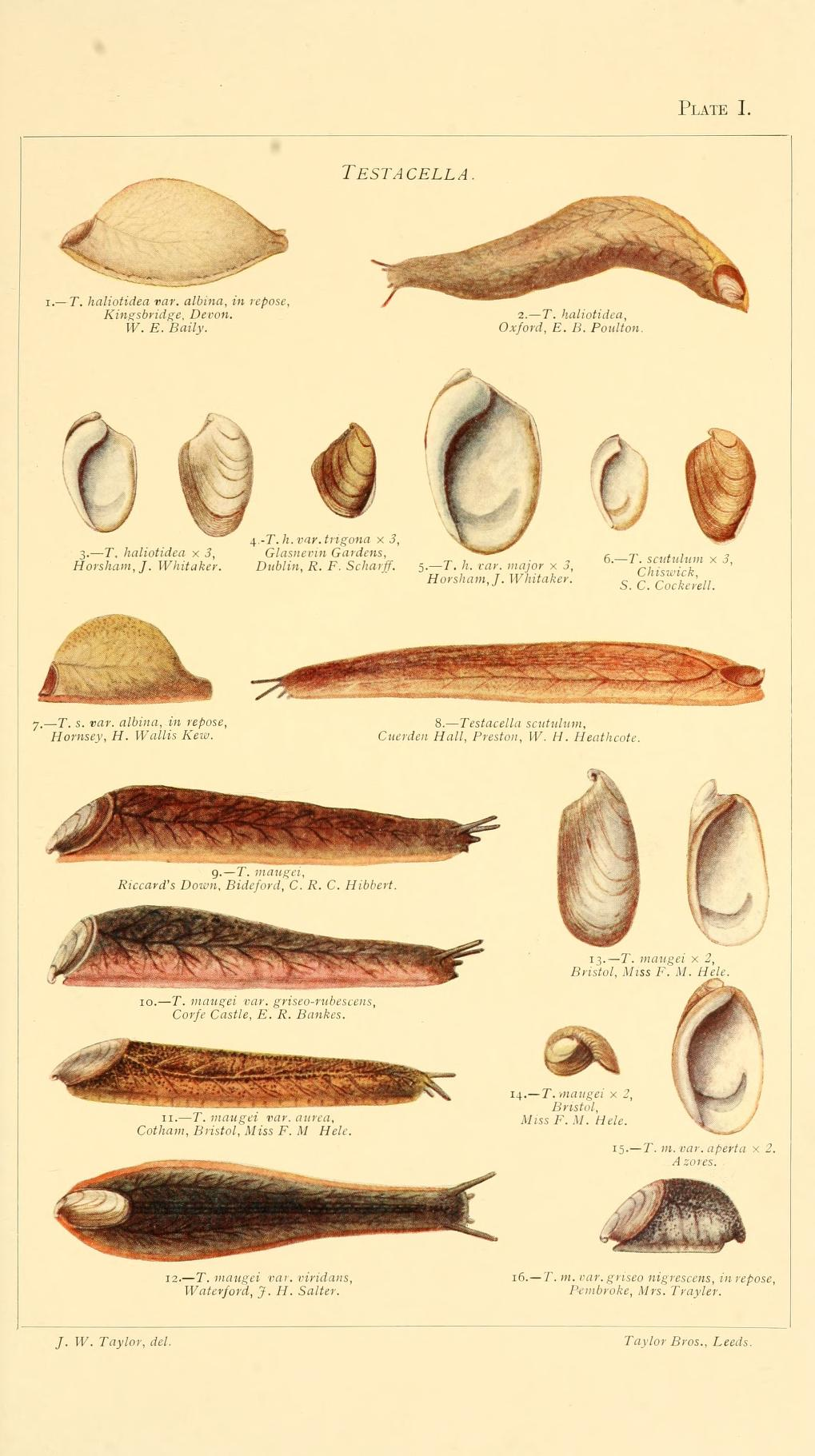
Testacella haliotidea, Testacella scutulum and Testacella maugei Plate from John W. Taylor Monograph of the land & freshwater Mollusca of the British Isles

== Description ==
This slug, like others in the family, has a small shell, which is situated towards the rear of the animal. The species epithet is haliotidea because the shell of this species resembles in shape a miniature version of the shell of the marine species in the family Haliotidae, the abalones.

This is a large, very agile, pale brown slug, with a length of 12 cm. It has a small ear-shaped, external shell, less than 1 cm long, at the tail end of the mantle.

The following shell description is modified from Tryon 1885. The shell is oval-auriform, depressed, and rugosely striate. It has a thin, readily deciduous epidermis. The apex is minute, very short and not separated from the columellar margin. The aperture is rounded and usually dilated anteriorly; the columella and the outer margin of the aperture form a distinct angle at their junction. The interior of the shell is whitish and pearly. The length of the shell is 6–10 mm.

== Distribution ==
This species is common along the western Mediterranean, along the European Atlantic coast and throughout Great Britain apart from northern Scotland. This slug occurs in Europe but its distribution is under-recorded there.

It was recorded in Czechia as an introduced species. It also occurs as an introduced species in southern Australia, New Zealand and North America (where it is called the earshell slug). The distribution data for the United States, (Oregon, Wisconsin) and Canada (British Columbia, Nova Scotia) are incomplete.

== Habitat ==
This species is seen mostly in the spring, living in cultivated habitats or on disturbed ground. The slug lives mostly underground, but may sometimes be found under stones or in leaf litter.

== Life habits ==
This slug hunts and eats earthworms underground. The radula teeth are a functional adaption in the capturing of prey.

== Conservation status ==
- Least concern (LC)
