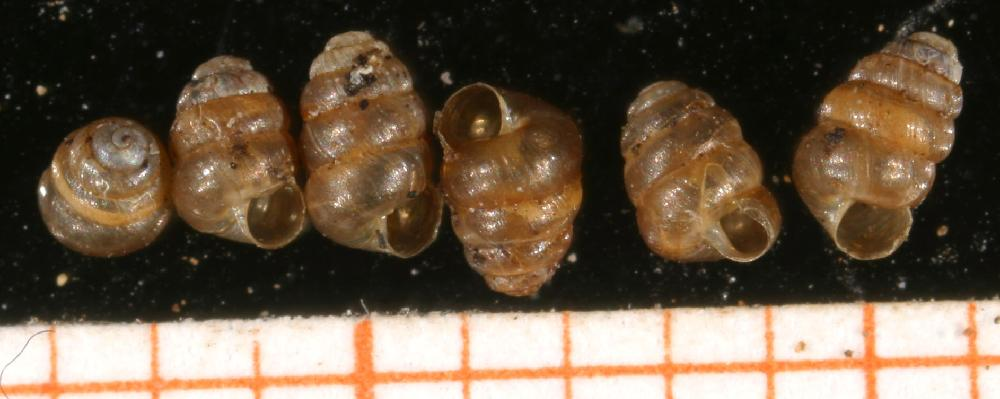
- Six shells of Columella edentula, scale bar in mm

Conservation status
- Secure (NatureServe)

Scientific classification
- Kingdom: Animalia
- Phylum: Mollusca
- Class: Gastropoda
- Order: Stylommatophora
- Family: Truncatellinidae
- Genus: Columella
- Species: C. edentula

Binomial name
- Columella edentula (Draparnaud, 1805)

Synonyms
- Columella inornata (Michaud, 1831) (junior synonym); Pupa edentula Draparnaud, 1805 (original combination); Pupa inornata Michaud, 1831 (junior synonym)

= Columella edentula =

Species of gastropod

Columella edentula, common name the toothless column snail, is a species of very small, air-breathing land snail, a terrestrial pulmonate gastropod mollusk or micromollusk in the family Truncatellinidae.

== Description ==
The 2.5-3 (-3.5) mm. shell is cylindrical with a conical apex and yellow-brown to brown. The aperture is without teeth and the simple lip is thin. The shell has (4.5 )5-6 (-7) whorls. The last whorl has the largest diameter. The apex is more pointed than in Columella columella. It is narrower and taller than the shell of the similar Columella aspera. The shell sculpture is more irregular and finer than that of C. aspera.

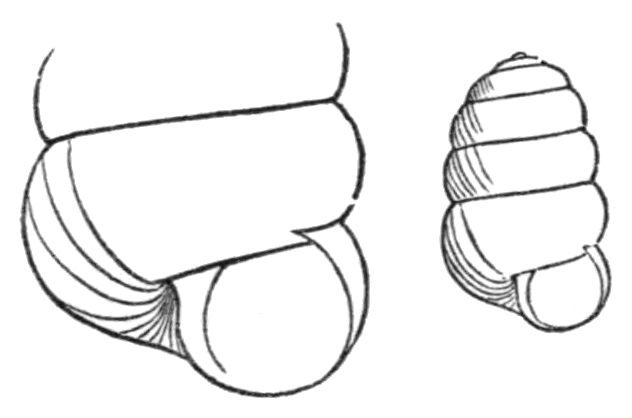
Details of the shell of Columella edentula

== Distribution ==
This species occurs in countries and islands including:

- Great Britain
- Ireland
- Ukraine
