= List of non-marine molluscs of Uzbekistan =

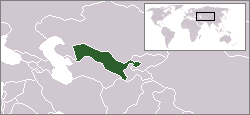
Location of Uzbekistan

The non-marine molluscs of Uzbekistan are a part of the wildlife of Uzbekistan. Uzbekistan is land-locked and has no marine molluscs, only land and freshwater species, including snails, slugs, and freshwater bivalves.

== Freshwater gastropods ==
Neritidae

- Theodoxus pallasi Lindholm, 1924

Hydrobiidae

- Caspiohydrobia behningi Starobogatov & Andreeva, 1981
- Caspiohydrobia grimmi Clessin, 1888
- Caspiohydrobia pavlovskii Starobogatov & Izzatullaev, 1974
- Caspiohydrobia sogdiana Starobogatov & Izzatullaev, 1974 - possibly locally extinct
- Bythiospeum
- Valvatamnicola archangelskii Zhadin, 1952

Valvatidae

- Valvata piscinalis (O. F. Müller, 1774)

Lymnaeidae

- Galba truncatula (Müller, 1774)
- Lymnaea stagnalis (Linnaeus, 1758)
- Lymnaea rectilabrum (Annandale & Prashad, 1919)
- Lymnaea tenera (Küster, 1863)
- Radix auricularia (Linnaeus, 1758)

Planorbidae

- Anisus septemgyratus (Rossmässler, 1835)
- Anisus spirorbis (Linnaeus, 1758)
- Kolhymorbis dildorae Izzatullaev, 1980
- Planorbarius corneus (Linnaeus, 1758)
- Planorbis planorbis (Linnaeus, 1758)

Physidae

- Physa fontinalis (Linnaeus, 1758)

== Land gastropods ==
Cochlicopidae

- Cochlicopa dushanbensis Starobogatov, 1996

Candaharia

- Candaharia Iangarika

Cochlicopa

- Cochlicopa starobogatovi

Leucozonella

- Leucozonella schileykoi

Pseudonapaeus

- Pseudonapaeus shahristanikus
- Pseudonapaeus sinistrorsa
- Pseudonapaeus zeravschnaicus

== Freshwater bivalves ==
Unionidae

- Anodonta cyrea Drouët, 1881

Corbiculidae

- Corbicula producta von Martens, 1905

Sphaeriidae

- Euglesa gurvichi Starobogatov & Izzatullaev, 1985
- Sphaerium corneum (Linnaeus, 1758)

Dreissenidae

- Dreissena caspia Eichwald, 1855 - possibly locally extinct
- Dreissena polymorpha Pallas, 1771

== See also ==
Lists of molluscs of surrounding countries:

- List of non-marine molluscs of Kazakhstan
- List of non-marine molluscs of Tajikistan
- List of non-marine molluscs of Kyrgyzstan
- List of non-marine molluscs of Afghanistan
- List of non-marine molluscs of Turkmenistan
