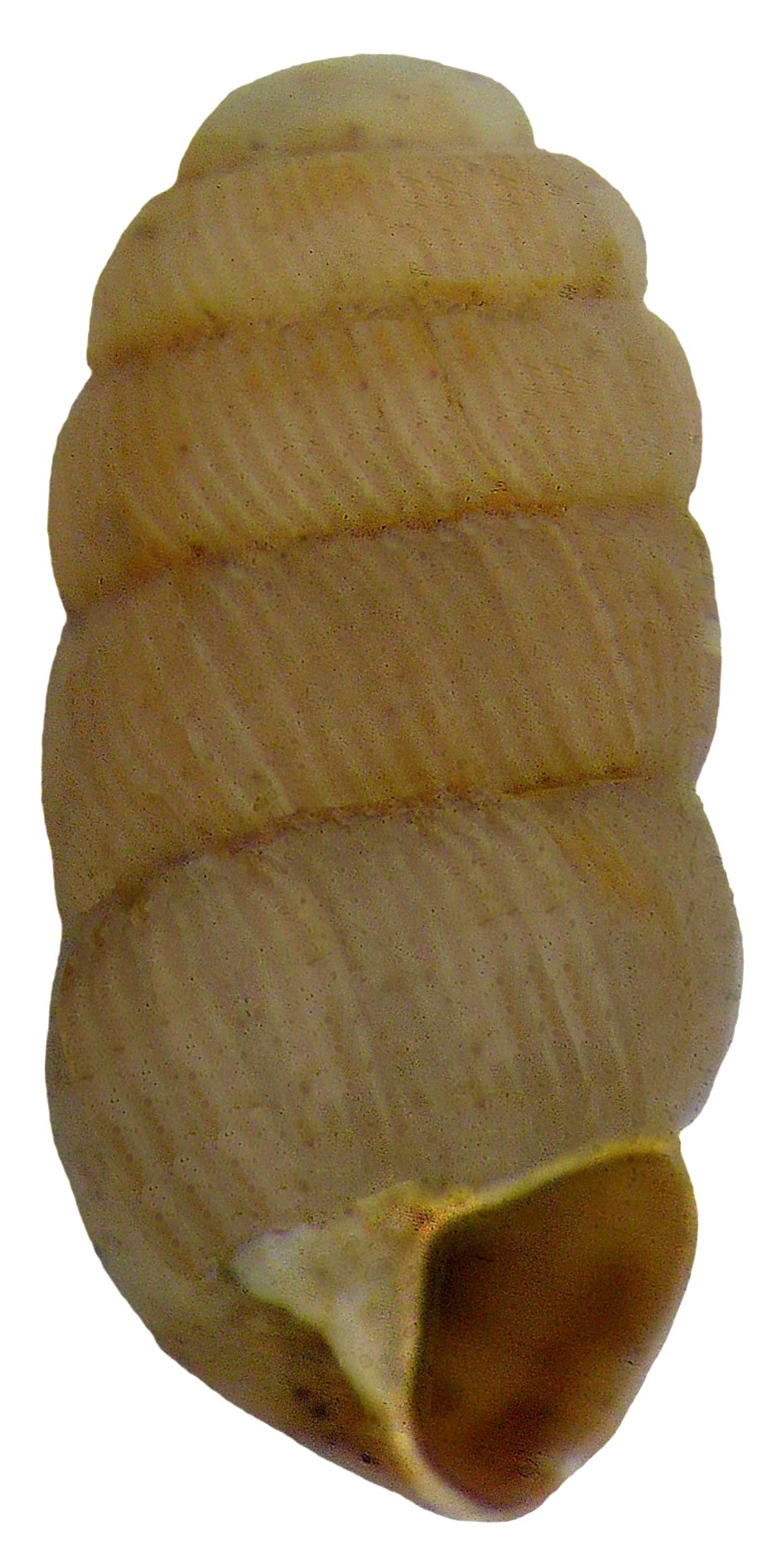

Scientific classification
- Kingdom: Animalia
- Phylum: Mollusca
- Class: Gastropoda
- Order: Stylommatophora
- Superfamily: Chondrinoidea
- Family: Truncatellinidae
- Genus: Truncatellina
- Species: T. cylindrica

Binomial name
- Truncatellina cylindrica (A. Férussac, 1807)

Synonyms
- Helix minuta O. F. Müller, 1774; Isthmia rothi Reinhardt, 1916 (original combination); Pupa (Pupilla) minutissima (Hartmann, 1821) (junior synonym); Pupa micula Mousson, 1876 (junior synonym); Pupa minutissima Hartmann, 1821 · (junior synonym); Truncatellina arcyensis W. Klemm, 1943 (junior synonym); Truncatellina cylindrica var. costigerella Lindholm, 1926; Truncatellina rothi (Reinhardt, 1916) junior subjective synonym; Truncatellina tauricola Lindholm, 1926 (a junior synonym); Vertigo cylindrica A. Férussac, 1807 (original name); Vertigo pupula Held, 1837 (junior synonym)

= Truncatellina cylindrica =

Species of gastropod

Truncatellina cylindrica is a species of very small air-breathing land snail, a terrestrial pulmonate gastropod mollusk in the family Truncatellinidae.

== Description ==
The length of the shell attains 1 mm. The width ranges from 0.91-1.01 mm. The height spans 1.80-2.24 mm. The shell notably has shallow sutures and a low, flat whorl. The species lacks apertural teeth.

== Distribution ==
This species occurs in European countries and islands including:

- Czech Republic
- Ukraine
- Great Britain (edge of distribution range)
- Ireland
- France, Greece, Turkey, Albania, Bulgaria, Cyprus
