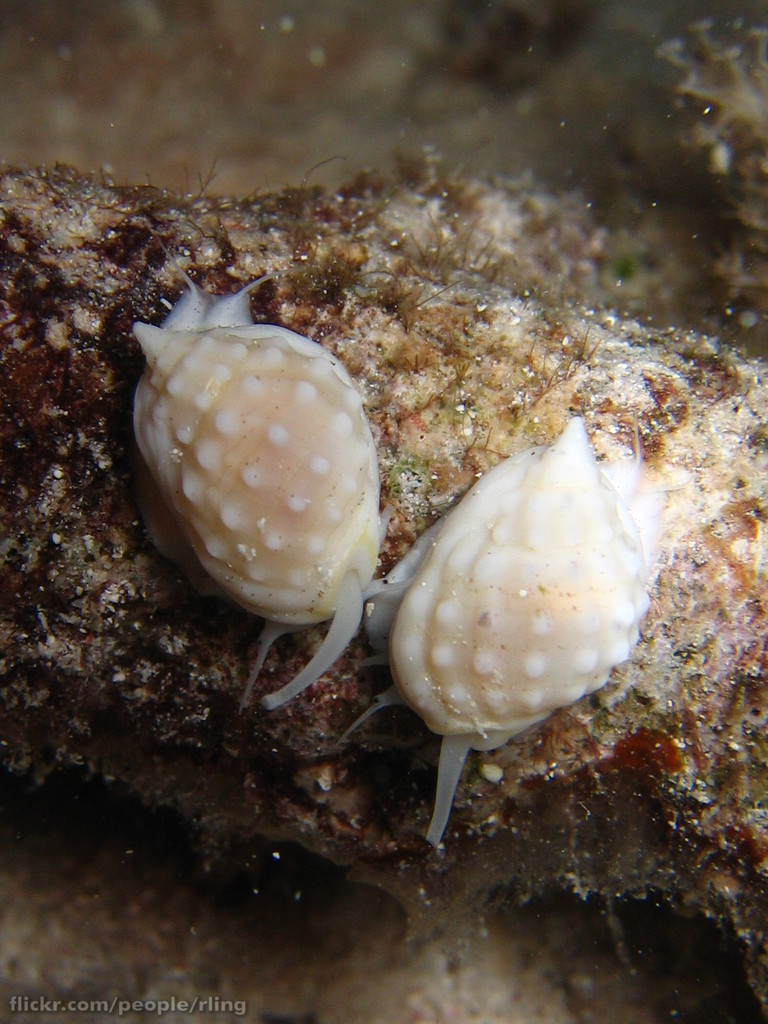
- Two live individuals of Nassarius granifer

Scientific classification
- Domain: Eukaryota
- Kingdom: Animalia
- Phylum: Mollusca
- Class: Gastropoda
- Subclass: Caenogastropoda
- Order: Neogastropoda
- Family: Nassariidae
- Subfamily: Nassariinae
- Genus: Nassarius
- Species: N. granifer

Binomial name
- Nassarius granifer Kiener, 1834

Synonyms
- list of synonyms: Arcularia (Plicarcularia) granulifera (Kiener, 1834); Buccinum graniferum Kiener, 1834; Buccinum verrucosum Bruguière, 1789; Nassa (Arcularia) granifera (Kiener, 1834); Nassa granifera (Kiener, 1834); Nassa obliqua Hombron, J.B. & C.H. Jacquinot, 1853; Nassa perlata Marrat, 1880; Nassarius (Plicarcularia) granifer (Kiener, 1834); Nassarius (Plicarcularia) graniferus (Kiener, 1834); Nassarius graniferus (Kiener, 1834) (misspelling); Nassarius granuliferus (Kiener, 1834) (misspelling); Plicarcularia granifera (Kiener, 1834); Plicarcularia graniferus (Kiener, 1834)

= Nassarius granifer =

Species of gastropod

Nassarius granifer, common name the granulated dog whelk or granulated nassa, is a species of sea snail with an operculum, a marine gastropod mollusc in the family Nassariidae, the mud snails or dog whelks.

== Description ==
The length of the shell of this species varies between 10 mm and 18 mm.

The shell is rather small, ovate, thick and globular. Its color is of an ash-white. The spire is conical and, pointed, composed of six whorls, the lowest much larger than all the other. This body whorl presents on its surface conical, distant tubercles, disposed in four series. A few transverse striae ornament the base. The upper whorls have only a single row of tubercles. The ovate aperture is narrow, emarginated at the upper part, at its union with the outer lip, which is thick, striated internally. The columella is arcuated, covering the inner lip, which is expanded into a white, thick callosity, covering the whole lower surface, and a portion of the upper whorls.

== Distribution ==
The shell occurs in the Indo-West Pacific Ocean off Réunion, Aldabra, Chagos, Mascarene Basin. Specimens of this species were gathered by Rizal in Dapitan in 1894 although he labeled them as Nassa arcularia; also off many islands in Oceania and off Australia (New South Wales, Northern Territory, Queensland).
