= List of non-marine molluscs of Pakistan =

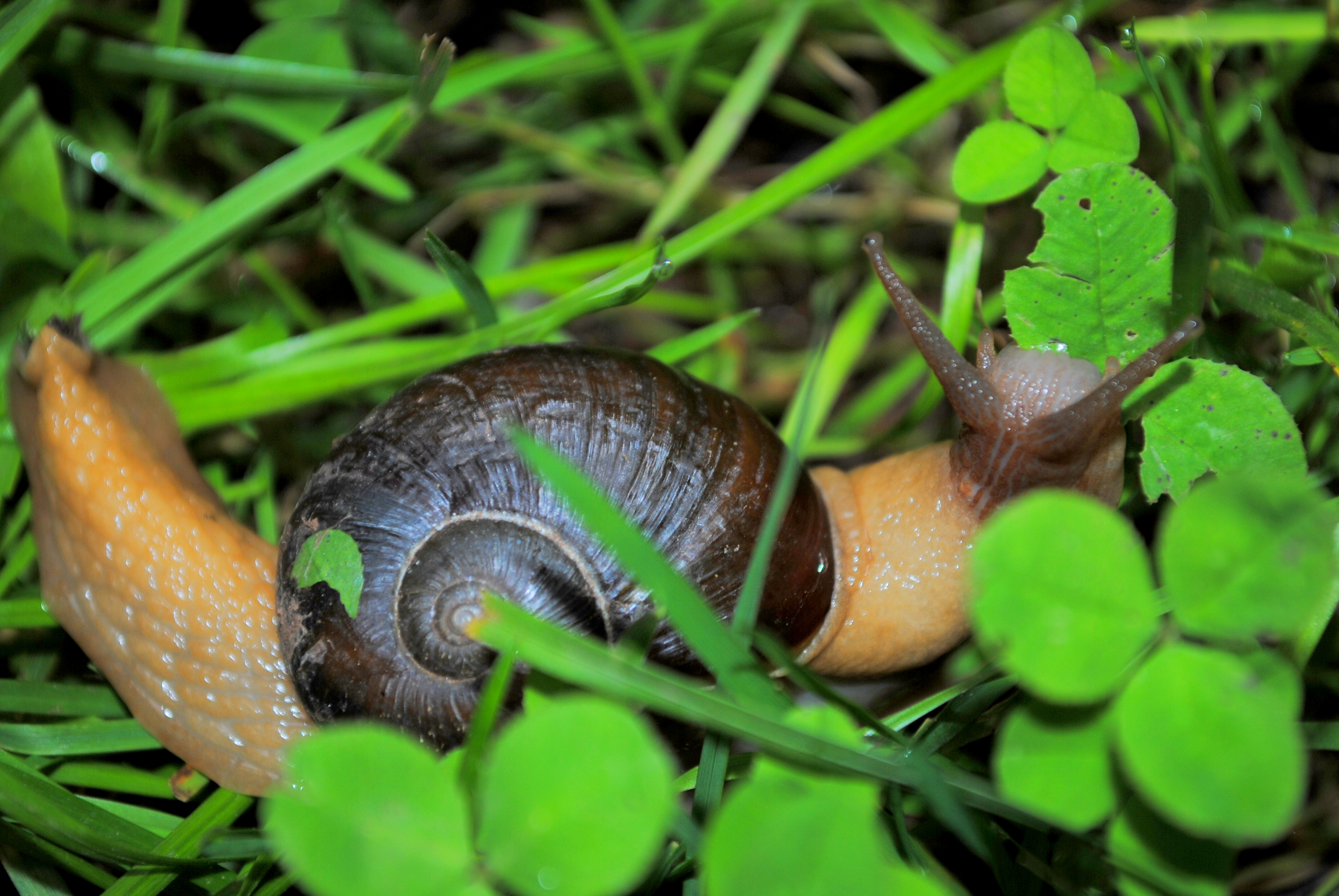
Snail (likely Cornu aspersum) in Nathia Gali.

The non-marine molluscs of Pakistan are a part of the fauna of Pakistan. They include land and freshwater gastropods and freshwater bivalves.

== Freshwater gastropods ==
Viviparidae

- Bellamya bengalensis (Lamarck 1822)

Thiaridae

- Melanoides tuberculata (Muller, 1774)

Lymnaeidae

- Lymnaea acuminata f. rufescens (Gray, 1820)
- Lymnaea acuminata f. chlamys (Benson, 1836)
- Lymnaea auricularia (Linnaeus, 1758)
- Lymnaea luteola (Lamarck, 1822)

Physidae

- Physa acuta (Draparnaud, 1805)
- Physa gyrina (Say, 1821)

Planorbidae

- Gyraulus convexiusculus (Hutton, 1849)
- Indoplanorbis exustus (Deshayes, 1834)

== Land gastropods ==
Chondrinidae

- Granaria lapidaria (Hutton, 1849)

Gastrocoptidae

- Boysia boysii (L. Pfeiffer, 1846)
- Boysidia tamtouriana Pokryszko, Auffenberg, Hlaváč & Naggs, 2009
- Gastrocopta avanica (Benson, 1863)
- Gastrocopta huttoniana (Benson, 1849)
- Gastrocopta klunzingeri (Jickeli, 1873)

Pupillidae

- Pupilla annandalei Pilsbry
- Pupilla khunjerabica Pokryszko, Auffenberg, Hlaváč & Naggs, 2009
- Pupilla muscorum (Linnaeus, 1758)
- Pupilla paraturcmenica Pokryszko, Auffenberg, Hlaváč & Naggs, 2009
- Pupilla satparanica Pokryszko, Auffenberg, Hlaváč & Naggs, 2009
- Pupilla signata (Mousson)
- Pupilla turcmenia (O. Boettger)
- Pupilla ziaratana Pokryszko, Auffenberg, Hlaváč & Naggs, 2009

Truncatellinidae

- Columella nymphaepratensis Pokryszko, Auffenberg, Hlaváč & Naggs, 2009
- Truncatellina ayubiana Pokryszko, Auffenberg, Hlaváč & Naggs, 2009
- Truncatellina babusarica Pokryszko, Auffenberg, Hlaváč & Naggs, 2009
- Truncatellina callicratis (Scacchi, 1833)
- Truncatellina himalayana (Benson, 1863)

Vertiginidae

- Vertigo antivertigo (Draparnaud, 1801)
- Vertigo nangaparbatensis Pokryszko, Auffenberg, Hlaváč & Naggs, 2009
- Vertigo pseudosubstriata Ložek, 1954
- Vertigo superstriata Pokryszko, Auffenberg, Hlaváč & Naggs, 2009

Clausiliidae

- Cylindrophaedusa farooqi (Auffenberg & Fakhri, 1995)

Parmacellidae

- Candaharia rutellum (Hutton, 1849)

Agriolimacidae

- Deroceras laeve (O. F. Müller, 1774)

Anadenidae

- Anadenus altivagus (Theobald, 1862)

Camaenidae

- Pseudiberus chitralensis (Odhner, 1963)

== See also ==
- List of non-marine molluscs of Afghanistan
- List of non-marine molluscs of Iran
- List of non-marine molluscs of India
- List of non-marine molluscs of China
