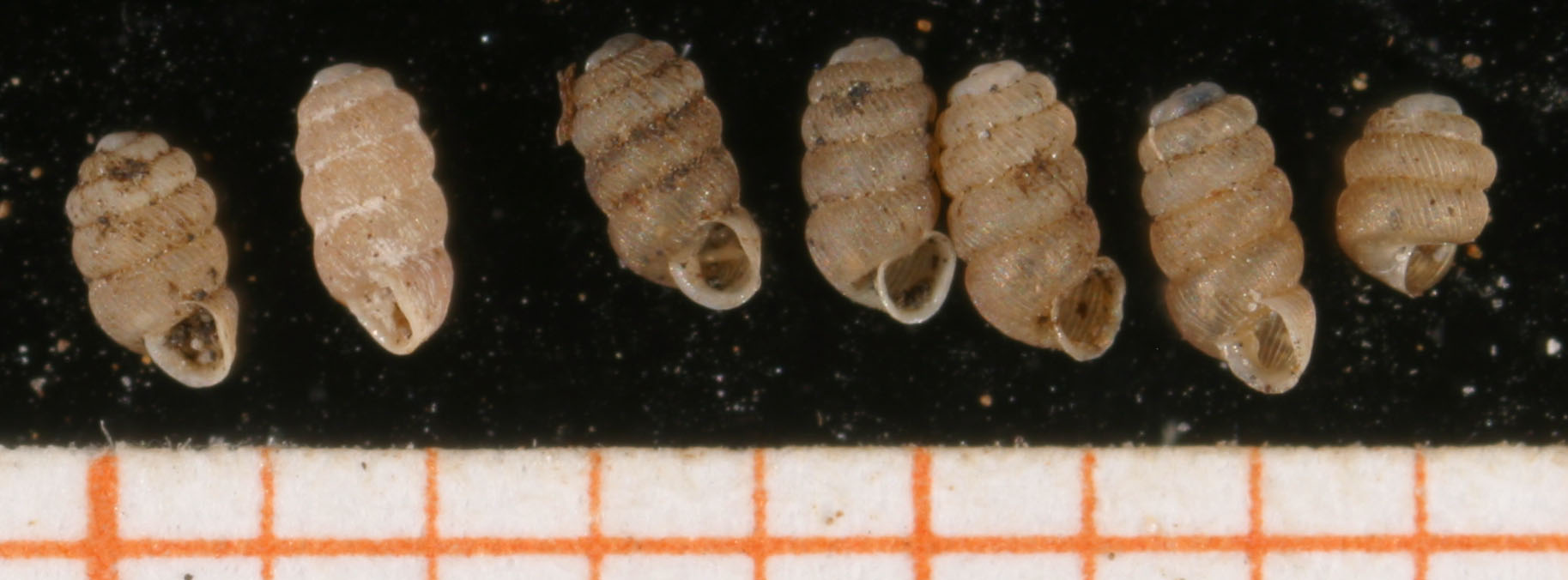

Scientific classification
- Kingdom: Animalia
- Phylum: Mollusca
- Class: Gastropoda
- Order: Stylommatophora
- Family: Truncatellinidae
- Genus: Truncatellina
- Species: T. callicratis

Binomial name
- Truncatellina callicratis (Scacchi, 1833)

Synonyms
- Isthmia strobeli (Gredler, 1856) junior subjective synonym; Pupa laevistriata Retowski, 1888 (junior synonym); Pupa rivierana Benson, 1854 (junior synonym); Pupa strobeli Gredler, 1856 (junior subjective synonym); Pupa strobeli var. scharffi O. Boettger, 1879 junior subjective synonym; Truncatellina rivierana (Benson, 1854) (junior synonym); Turbo callicratis Scacchi, 1833 (original name)

= Truncatellina callicratis =

Species of gastropod

Truncatellina callicratis is a species of very small air-breathing land snail, a terrestrial pulmonate gastropod mollusk in the family Truncatellinidae.

== Distribution ==
This species is known to occur in a number of countries and islands including:

- Great Britain, (rare in the south)
- Albania
- Italy
- Pakistan
- and other areas
