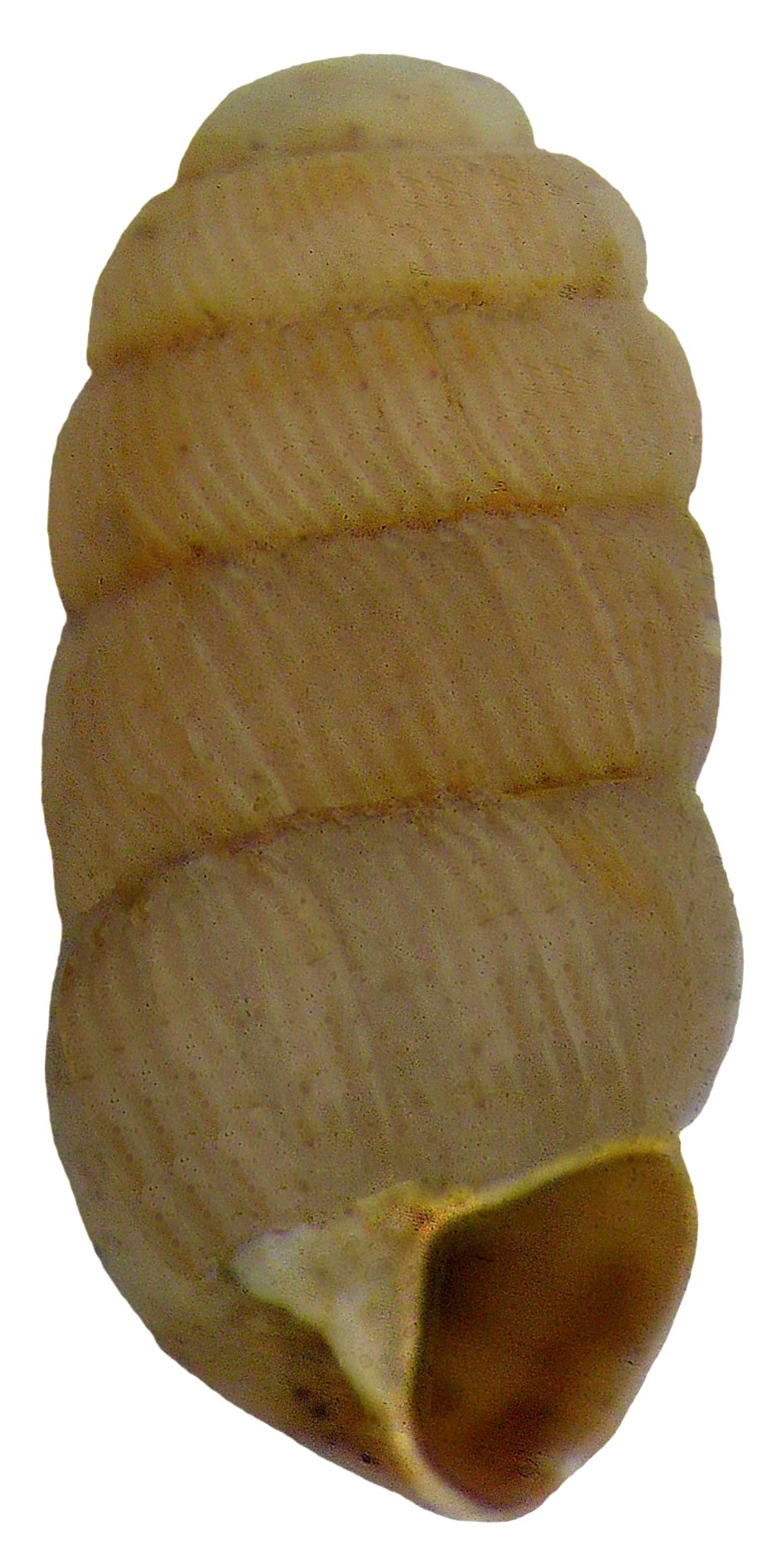
- Truncatellina cylindrica

Scientific classification
- Kingdom: Animalia
- Phylum: Mollusca
- Class: Gastropoda
- Order: Stylommatophora
- Infraorder: Pupilloidei
- Superfamily: Chondrinoidea
- Family: Truncatellinidae
- Genus: Truncatellina; Lowe, 1852

Type species
- Pupa (Truncatellina) linearis R. T. Lowe, 1852

Synonyms
- Franzia Blume, 1965 · unaccepted (junior primary homonym of Franzia...); Laurinella P. Hesse, 1915; Pupa (Truncatellina) R. T. Lowe, 1852 (original rank)

= Truncatellina =

Genus of gastropods

Truncatellina is a genus of very small air-breathing land snails, terrestrial pulmonate gastropod mollusks in the family Truncatellinidae.

== Species ==
Species in the genus Truncatellina include:

- Truncatellina adami Bruggen, 1994
- Truncatellina algoviana Colling & Karle-Fendt, 2016
- Truncatellina arboricola Tattersfield, 1995
- Truncatellina atomus (Shuttleworth, 1852)
- Truncatellina ayubiana Auffenberg & Pokryszko, 2009
- Truncatellina babusarica Auffenberg & Pokryszko, 2009
- Truncatellina beckmanni Quintana, 2010
- † Truncatellina belokrysi Prysjazhnjuk, 1978
- Truncatellina bhutanensis Gittenberger, Leda & Sherub, 2013
- † Truncatellina biscoitoi Hutterer & Groh, 1993
- Truncatellina callicratis (Scacchi, 1833)
- Truncatellina cameroni Triantis & Pokryszko, 2004
- Truncatellina claustralis (Gredler, 1856)
- Truncatellina costulata (Nilsson, 1823)
- † Truncatellina cryptodonta (A. Braun, 1851)
- Truncatellina cylindrica (J. B. Férussac, 1807)
- † Truncatellina dentata Steklov, 1966
- Truncatellina dysorata (Melvill & Ponsonby, 1893)
- Truncatellina flavogilva Germain, 1934
- Truncatellina haasi Venmans, 1957
- Truncatellina himalayana (Benson, 1863)
- Truncatellina insulivaga (Pilsbry & Hirase, 1904)
- Truncatellina iota (Melvill & Ponsonby, 1894)
- Truncatellina laeviuscula (Küster, 1850) (uncertain)
- Truncatellina lardea (Jickeli, 1874)
- †Truncatellina lentilii (Miller, 1900)
- Truncatellina linearis (R. T. Lowe, 1852)
- Truncatellina lussinensis (R. T. Lowe, 1852)
- Truncatellina maresquelli Fischer-Piette, C. P. Blanc, F. Blanc & Salvat, 1994
- † Truncatellina micra (Ping, 1929)
- Truncatellina monodon (Held, 1837)
- Truncatellina naivashaensis (Preston, 1911)
- Truncatellina ninagongonis (Pilsbry, 1935)
- Truncatellina obesa Adam, 1954
- Truncatellina opisthodon (Reinhardt, 1879)
- †Truncatellina pantherae Harzhauser & Neubauer in Harzhauser et al., 2014
- Truncatellina perplexa (Burnup in Melvill & Ponsonby, 1908)
- † Truncatellina podolica (Łomnicki, 1886)
- † Truncatellina portosantana Hutterer & Groh, 1993
- Truncatellina prainhana Hutterer & Groh, 1993
- Truncatellina pretoriensis (Melvill & Ponsonby, 1893)
- Truncatellina purpuraria Hutterer & Groh, 1993
- Truncatellina pygmaeorum (Pilsbry & Cockerell, 1933)
- Truncatellina quantula (Melvill & Ponsonby, 1893)
- Truncatellina ruwenzoriensis Adam, 1957
- Truncatellina silvicola de Winter, 1990
- †Truncatellina splendidula (Sandberger, 1875)
- †Truncatellina suprapontica Wenz & Edlauer, 1942
- Truncatellina sykesii (Melvill & Ponsonby, 1893)
- † Truncatellina taurica Prysjazhnjuk, 1978
- Truncatellina thomensis D. T. Holyoak & G. A. Holyoak, 2020
- Truncatellina uniarmata (Küster, 1856) (uncertain)
- Truncatellina upembae Adam, 1954
- Truncatellina velkovrhi Štamol, 1995

Synonyms

- Truncatellina arcyensis W. Klemm, 1943: synonym of Truncatellina cylindrica (A. Férussac, 1807) (junior synonym)
- † Truncatellina cryptodus (F. Sandberger, 1858): synonym of † Truncatellina cryptodonta (A. Braun, 1851)
- † Truncatellina dilatata Yu, 2020: synonym of † Euthema dilatata (Yu, 2020)
- † Truncatellina dilatatus Yu, 2020: synonym of † Euthema dilatata (Yu, 2020)
- Truncatellina mutandaensis (Preston, 1913): synonym of Truncatellina naivashaensis (Preston, 1911) (junior synonym)
- Truncatellina rivierana (Benson, 1854): synonym of Truncatellina callicratis (Scacchi, 1833) (junior synonym)
- Truncatellina rothi (Reinhardt, 1916): synonym of Truncatellina cylindrica (J. B. Férussac, 1807) (junior subjective synonym)
- Truncatellina tauricola Lindholm, 1926: synonym of Truncatellina cylindrica (J. B. Férussac, 1807) (a junior synonym)
