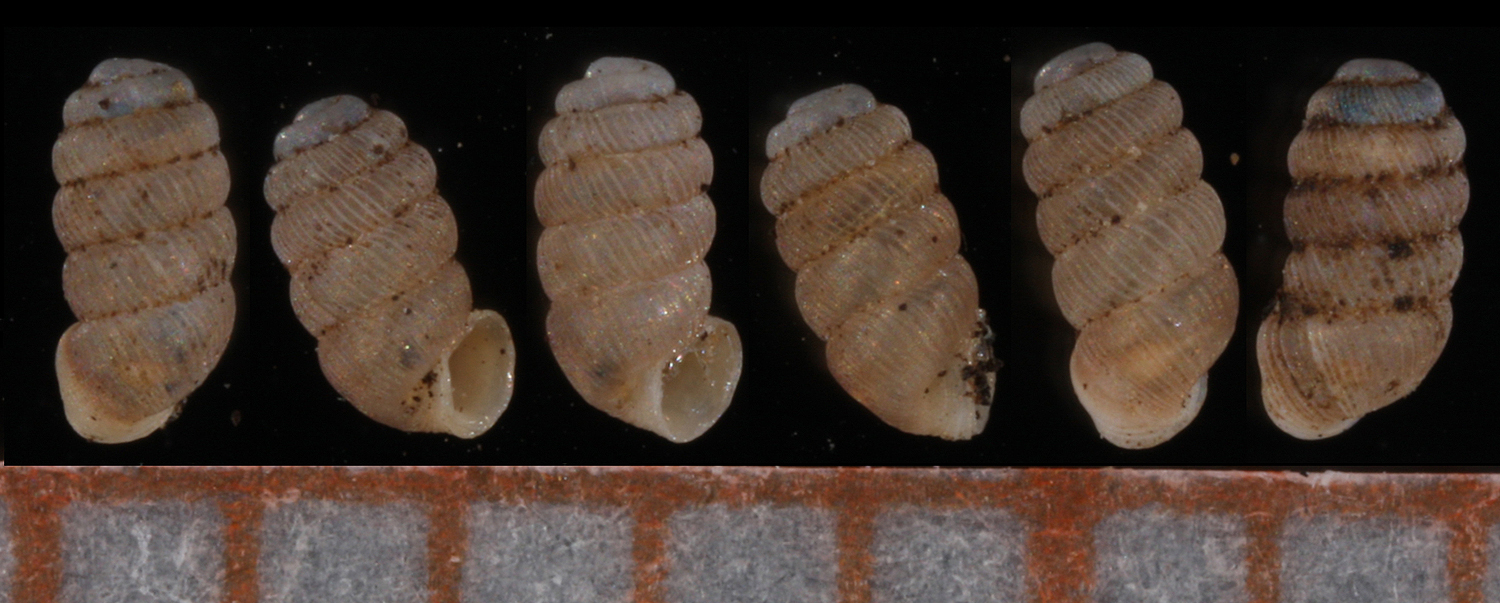
- Truncatellina costulata

Scientific classification
- Kingdom: Animalia
- Phylum: Mollusca
- Class: Gastropoda
- Order: Stylommatophora
- Family: Truncatellinidae
- Genus: Truncatellina
- Species: T. costulata

Binomial name
- Truncatellina costulata (Nilsson, 1823)

= Truncatellina costulata =

Species of gastropod

Truncatellina costulata is a species of very small air-breathing land snail, a terrestrial pulmonate gastropod mollusk in the family Truncatellinidae.

== Distribution ==
This species occurs in:

- Czech Republic - in Bohemia and in Moravia.
- Slovakia
- Ukraine
