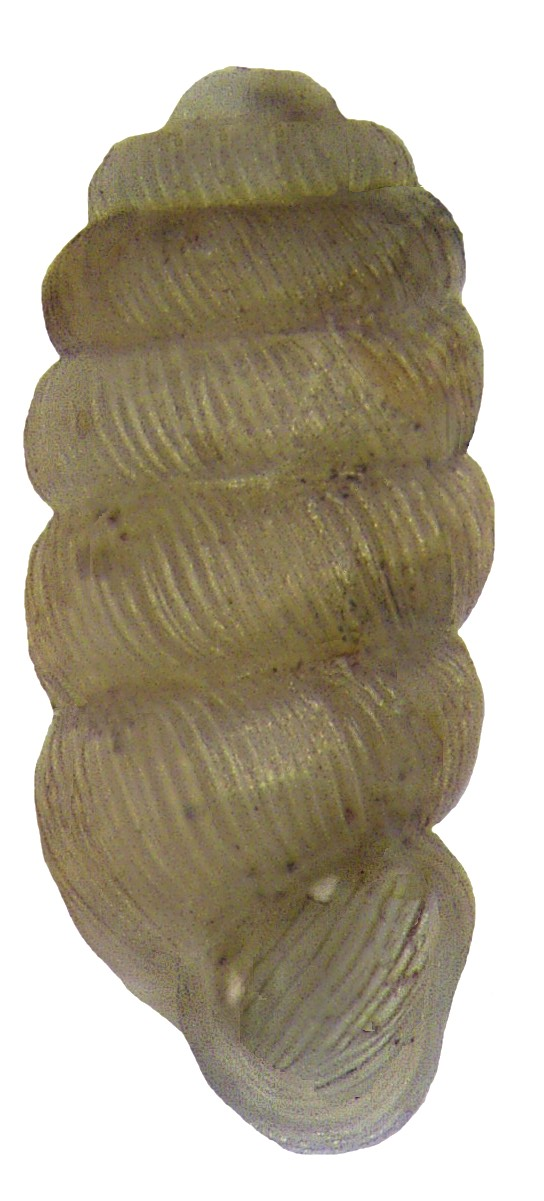

Scientific classification
- Domain: Eukaryota
- Kingdom: Animalia
- Phylum: Mollusca
- Class: Gastropoda
- Order: Stylommatophora
- Family: Truncatellinidae
- Genus: Truncatellina
- Species: T. claustralis

Binomial name
- Truncatellina claustralis (Gredler, 1856)

= Truncatellina claustralis =

Species of gastropod

Truncatellina claustralis is a species of very minute, air-breathing land snail, a terrestrial pulmonate gastropod mollusc, or micromollusc, in the family Truncatellinidae, the vertigo snails and their allies.

== Distribution ==
Distribution of this species is central-European and southern-European.

- Bulgaria
- Czech Republic
- Poland - critically endangered
- Slovakia
- Ukraine
