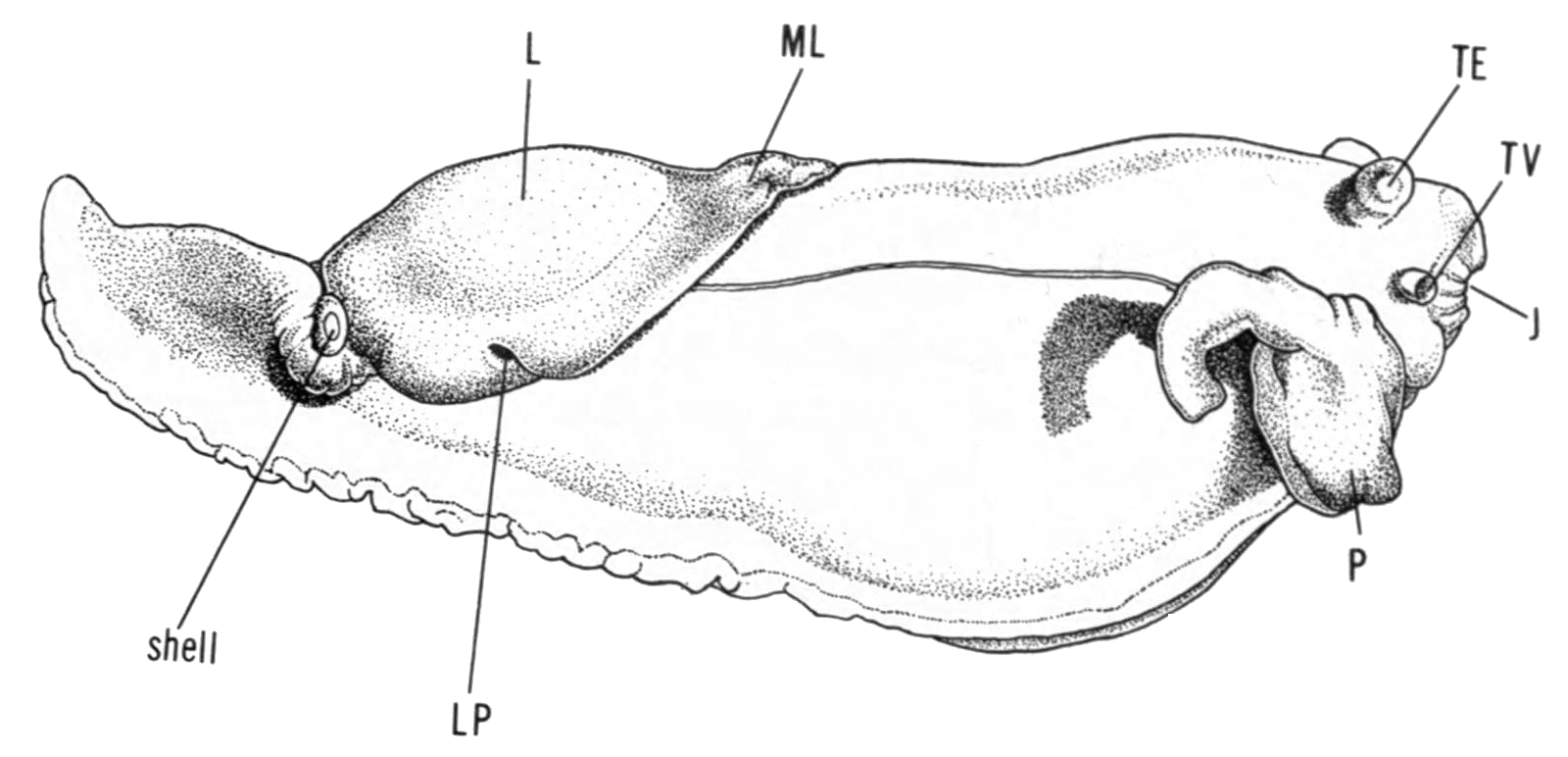
- Drawing of lateral view of preserved specimen of Candaharia rutellum

Scientific classification
- Kingdom: Animalia
- Phylum: Mollusca
- Class: Gastropoda
- Order: Stylommatophora
- Family: Parmacellidae
- Genus: Candaharia
- Species: C. rutellum

Binomial name
- Candaharia rutellum (Hutton, 1849)

Synonyms
- Parmacella (Proparmacella) rutellum (Hutton, 1849)

= Candaharia rutellum =

Species of gastropod

Candaharia rutellum is a species of air-breathing land slug, a terrestrial gastropod mollusk in the family Parmacellidae.

== Distribution ==
The distribution of Candaharia rutellum includes mountains in Central Asia: Tien-Shan, Alai and Pamir-Darvaz.

- Afghanistan
- Pakistan
- Kyrgyzstan
- Tajikistan

Other known areas of distribution include:

- The surroundings of Saint Petersburg, Russia.

The type locality for this species is Kandahar, Afghanistan.

== Description ==
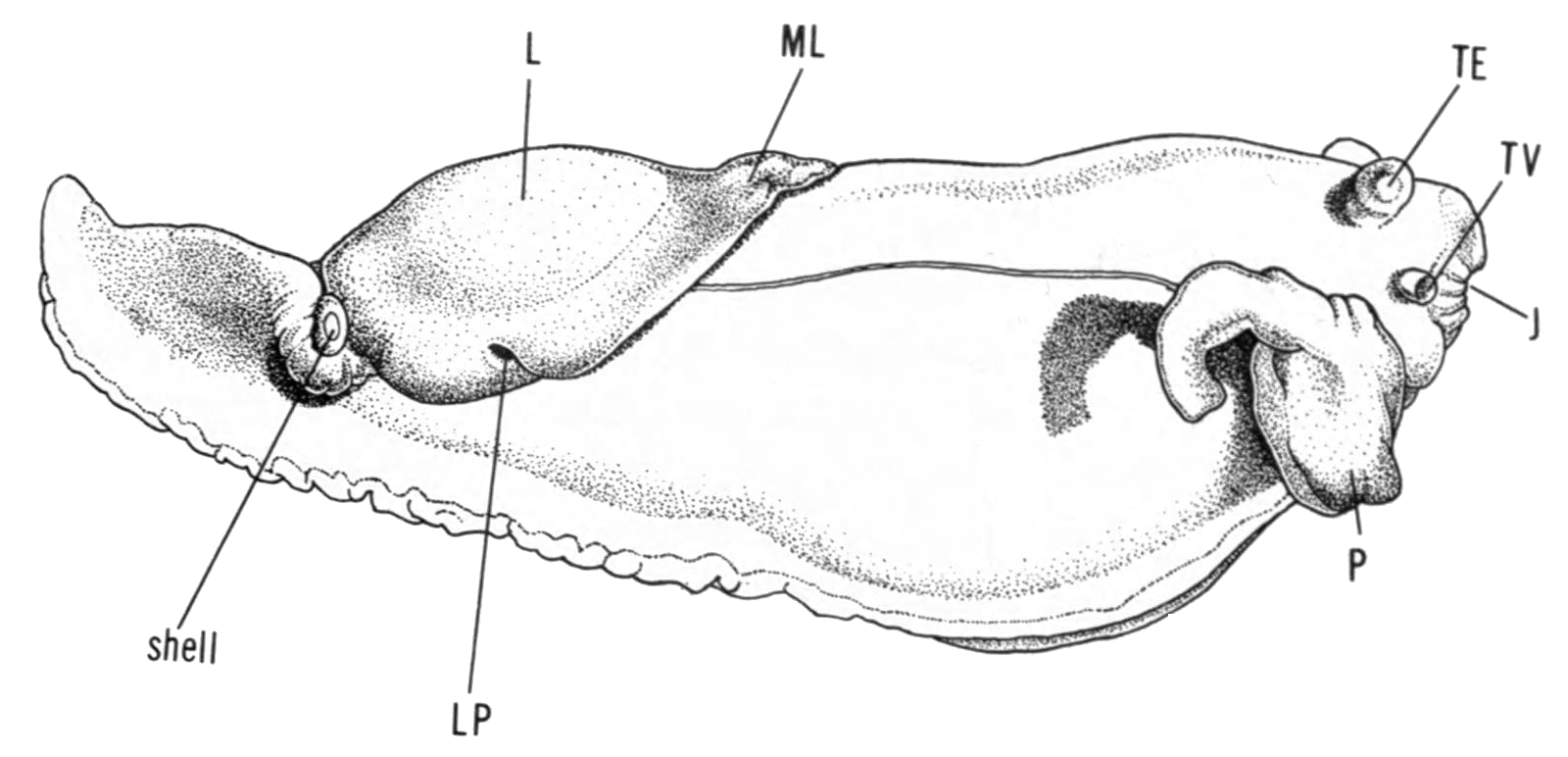
External morphology of Candaharia rutellum: L - left shell lap of mantle ML - left mantle lobe TE - upper tentacle (ommatophore) TV - lower tentacle J - mouth P - penis LP - pneumostome
