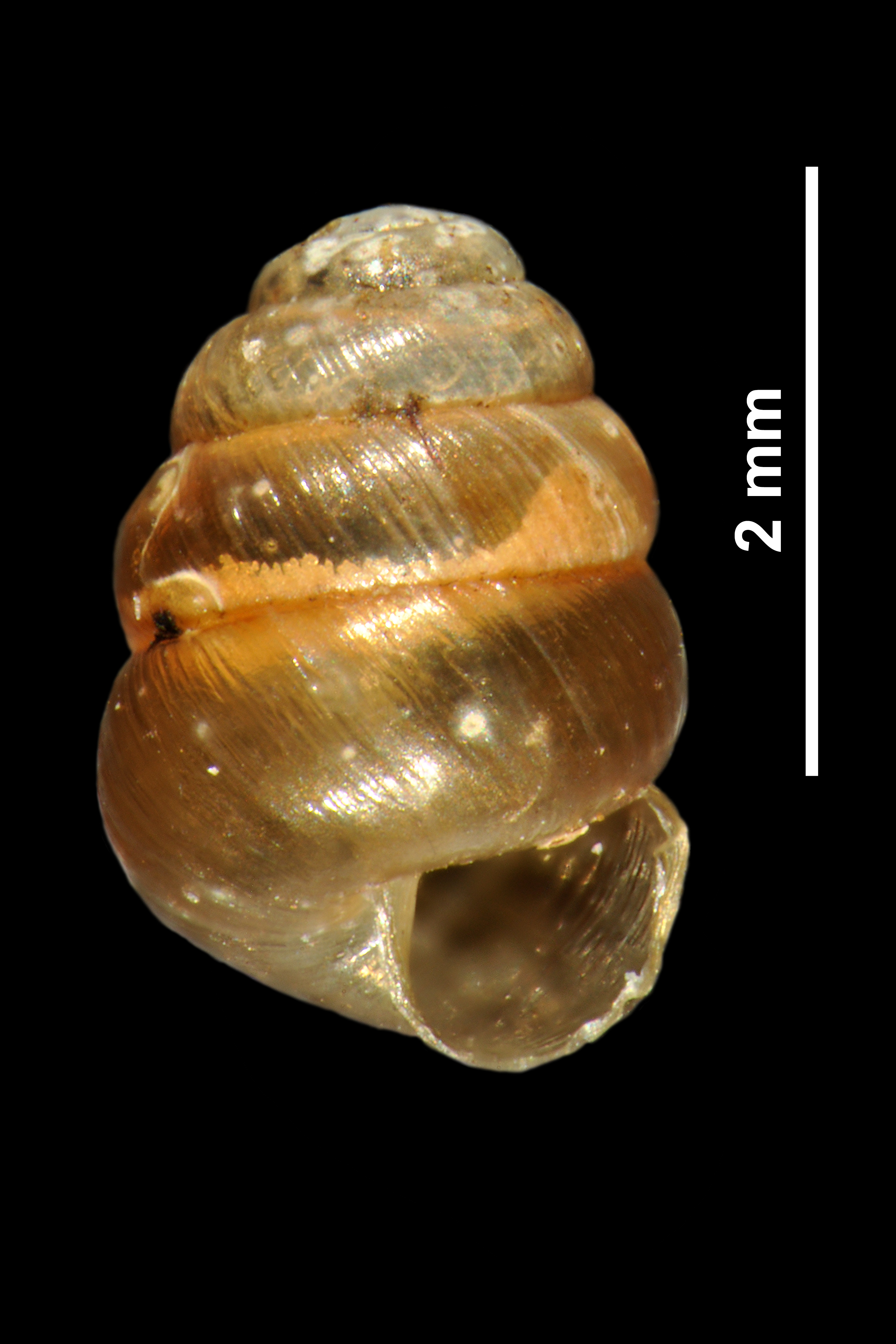
- Shell of Columella aspera (specimen at MNHN, Pzris)

Scientific classification
- Domain: Eukaryota
- Kingdom: Animalia
- Phylum: Mollusca
- Class: Gastropoda
- Order: Stylommatophora
- Family: Truncatellinidae
- Genus: Columella
- Species: C. aspera

Binomial name
- Columella aspera Waldén, 1966

= Columella aspera =

Species of gastropod

Columella aspera is a species of very small air-breathing land snail, a terrestrial pulmonate gastropod mollusk in the family of Truncatellinidae, the vertigo snails and allies.

== Description ==
The 2.0-2.5 x 1.3-1.4 mm. shell has 4-5 whorls and the spire tapers towards the apex. The aperture is simple without teeth. The colour is dark grey brown or horny brown. The surface is not shiny and finely and regularly striated. It is more coarsely sculptured than the very similar Columella edentula.

== Distribution ==
This species occurs in countries and islands including:

- Czech Republic
- Great Britain
- Ireland
