= Truncatellina atomus =

Conservation status
- Data Deficient (IUCN 3.1)

Scientific classification
- Kingdom: Animalia
- Phylum: Mollusca
- Class: Gastropoda
- Order: Stylommatophora
- Family: Truncatellinidae
- Genus: Truncatellina
- Species: T. atomus

Binomial name
- Truncatellina atomus Shuttlewort, 1852

Species of gastropod

Truncatellina atomus is a species of small air-breathing land snail, a terrestrial animal pulmonate gastropod mollusk in the family Truncatellinidae.

This species is endemic to the Canary Islands.
