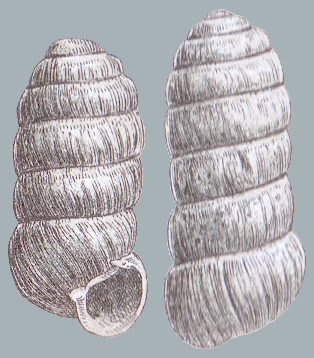
- Drawing of two shells of Columella columella

Conservation status
- Least Concern (IUCN 3.1)

- Secure (NatureServe)

Scientific classification
- Kingdom: Animalia
- Phylum: Mollusca
- Class: Gastropoda
- Order: Stylommatophora
- Family: Truncatellinidae
- Genus: Columella
- Species: C. columella

Binomial name
- Columella columella (G. v. Martens, 1830)

= Columella columella =

Species of gastropod

Columella columella is a species of small air-breathing land snail, a terrestrial pulmonate gastropod mollusk in the family Truncatellinidae, the vertigo snails and allies.

This species is listed in the IUCN red list as least concern.

Subspecies
Columella columella alticola (Ingersoll, 1875)

== Distribution ==
This species occurs in:

- Poland - critically endangered in southern Poland
- Slovakia
- Utah, USA (Columella columella alticola)
