= Vertigo pseudosubstriata =

Vertigo pseudosubstriata Temporal range: Pleistocene–Recent

Scientific classification
- Domain: Eukaryota
- Kingdom: Animalia
- Phylum: Mollusca
- Class: Gastropoda
- Order: Stylommatophora
- Family: Vertiginidae
- Subfamily: Vertigininae
- Genus: Vertigo
- Species: V. pseudosubstriata

Binomial name
- Vertigo pseudosubstriata Ložek, 1954

Synonyms
- Vertigo laevis Uvalieva, 1967; Vertigo (Boreovertigo) pseudosubstriata Ložek, 1954 · alternate representation

Species of gastropod

Vertigo pseudosubstriata is a species of minute, air-breathing land snail, a terrestrial pulmonate gastropod mollusc or micromollusk in the family Vertiginidae, the whorl snails.

== Distribution ==
Vertigo pseudosubstriata was first identified as a Pleistocene fossil in the Weichselian loess of Dolní Věstonice (Moravia, Czech Republic). Further Pleistocene evidence followed in Central Europe.

The first indications of recent occurrences of the species in the Tien Shan were submitted by Matěkin. Uvalieva (1967) discovered the species anew in the Southern Altai Mountains and initially described it as Vertigo laevis (synonym). Recently, this species has been found in the Tien Shan, Altai Mountains, Pamir Mountains, and Himalayas, where it is relatively widespread at alpine altitudes.

The recent distribution of Vertigo pseudosubstriata includes:

- Pakistan
- Kazakhstan

== Shell description ==
The shape of the shell is cylindrical-ovate.

The width of the shell is 1.2 mm; the height of the shell is 2.1-2.2 mm.
