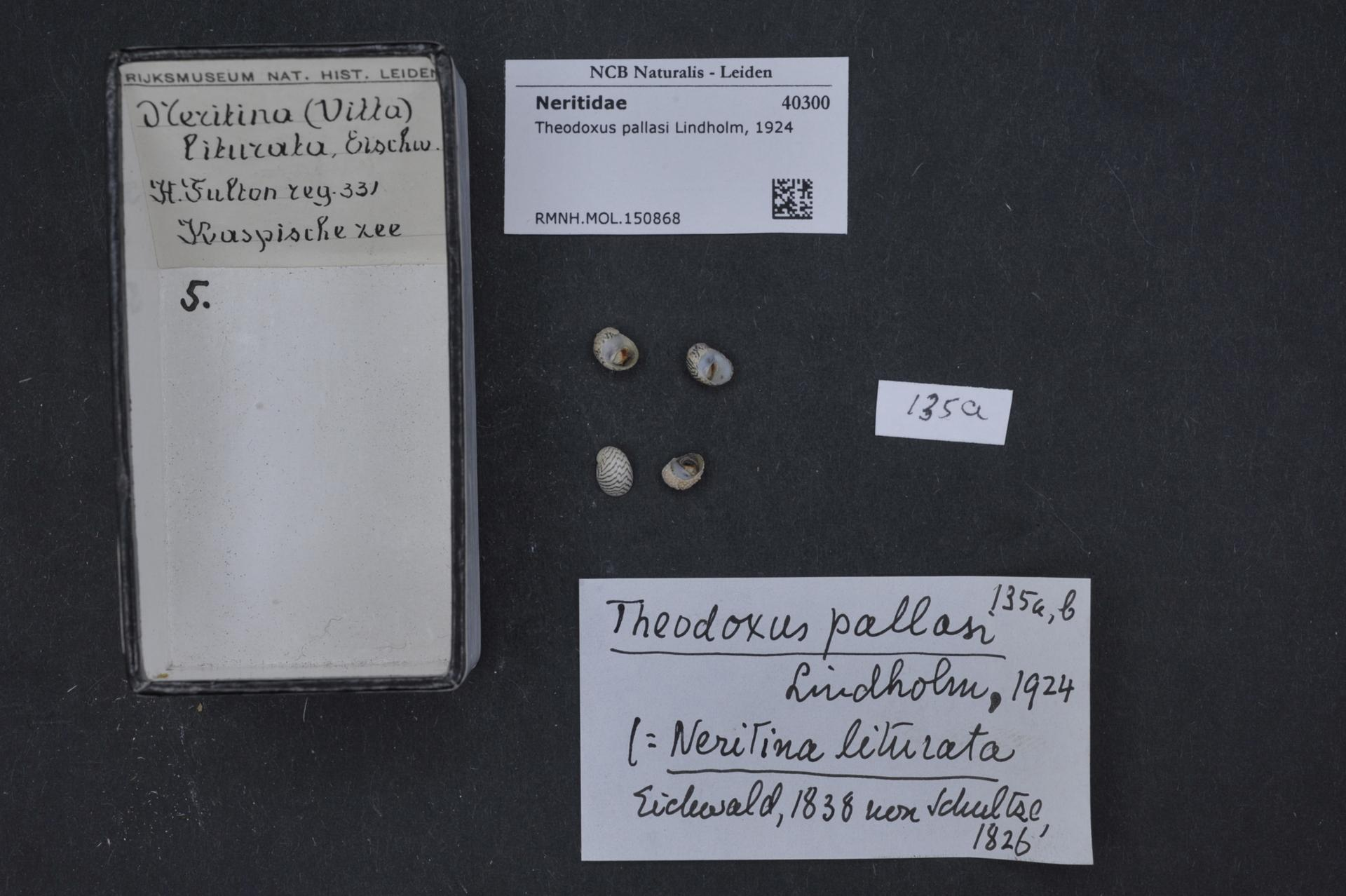
- Theodoxus pallasi

Conservation status
- Data Deficient (IUCN 3.1)

Scientific classification
- Kingdom: Animalia
- Phylum: Mollusca
- Class: Gastropoda
- Order: Cycloneritida
- Family: Neritidae
- Genus: Theodoxus
- Species: T. pallasi

Binomial name
- Theodoxus pallasi Lindholm, 1924

Synonyms
- Neritina liturata Eichwald, 1838; Theodoxus lituratus (Eichwald, 1838)

= Theodoxus pallasi =

Species of gastropod

Theodoxus pallasi is a species of a freshwater snail with an operculum, an aquatic gastropod mollusk in the family Neritidae, the nerites.

== Description ==
Coloration, radula and operculum of Theodoxus pallasi is similar to Theodoxus schultzii.

== Distribution ==
The distribution of is Ponto-Caspian.

This species occurs in:

- Caspian Sea
- Armenia
- Kazakhstan
- South Russia
- Uzbekistan
- It was recorded from Kerman Province and Mazandaran Province in Iran (as Theodoxus lituratus)

== Predators ==
Predators of Theodoxus pallasi include:

- dunlin Calidris alpina
