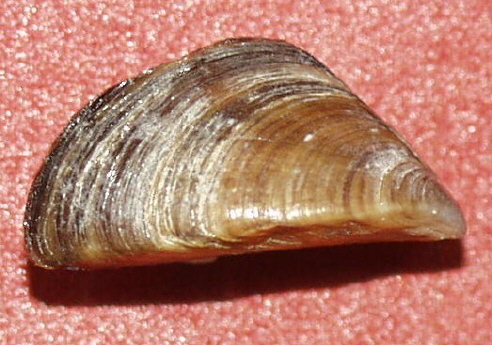
- A shell (without byssus) of Dreissena polymorpha

Scientific classification
- Kingdom: Animalia
- Phylum: Mollusca
- Class: Bivalvia
- Order: Myida
- Family: Dreissenidae
- Genus: Dreissena; Beneden, 1835

Species
- See text

= Dreissena =

Dreissena Temporal range: Late Miocene–Present

Genus of bivalves

Dreissena is a genus of small freshwater mussels in the family Dreissenidae in the class Bivalvia. They are found attached to firm substrates by threads from underneath the shells and are the only freshwater bivalves to attach to hard substrates in high densities while having a planktonic larval stage. They are considered the most aggressive freshwater invader in the world because of their ability to invade environments in every stage of their life cycle.

== Description ==
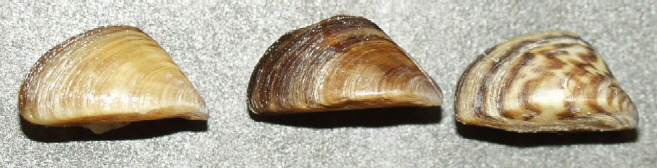
Dreissena image of different stripe patterns

Dreissena have prominent dark and light banding on the shell but can have many different variations. The outer covering is a well polished light tan color with dark bands that can either be smooth or zigzagging in shape. The shell shape is either trigonal or triangular with sharply pointed umbos. Under the umbos is the hinge plate that is broad and well developed. A ridge runs from umbos to the posterior point forming a shoulder. The byssal threads are secreted by the byssal gland posterior to the food.

== Location ==
Native to the Black, Caspian and Azov Seas. Originally found in Ukraine and Southeast Russia but have spread worldwide via ballast water and on the hull of boats, and are now in North America in the Great Lakes. They prefer large estuaries and inland waters, rivers and lakes, and require firm surfaces for attachments. Freshwater lakes with Dreissena are mesotrophic - high pH, moderate alkalinity, and have moderate amounts of dissolved minerals. They are almost always benthic but can have pelagic larvae that get carried in the currents.

== Distribution ==
Dreissena are able to travel in each stage of their life cycle. They can attach to firm surfaces, like boat hulls, and travel far distances. Once at a new location they reproduce quickly and become invasive.

== Reproduction ==
The oogenesis stage first occurs in autumn. The eggs develop and are fertilized in the spring with warmer weather. Eggs are expelled by females in their second year of life and are fertilized outside of the body by males. Spawning season first begins when the water temperatures increase to 12 degrees Celsius and the eggs are generally released when the water reaches 17-18 degrees Celsius. The optimal temperature for larval development is 20-22 degrees Celsius. Over 40,000 eggs can be laid in one cycle and both eggs and larvae are dispersed through water currents and winds at lakes/ponds. The settling stage is when they attach to a substrate with byssal threads secreted by the byssal gland. There is an extremely high mortality at this stage (99%) if they do not attach to sturdy substrates. The lifespan is 3–9 years and their growth rates are .5mm a day and 1.5–2 cm a year.

== Diet ==
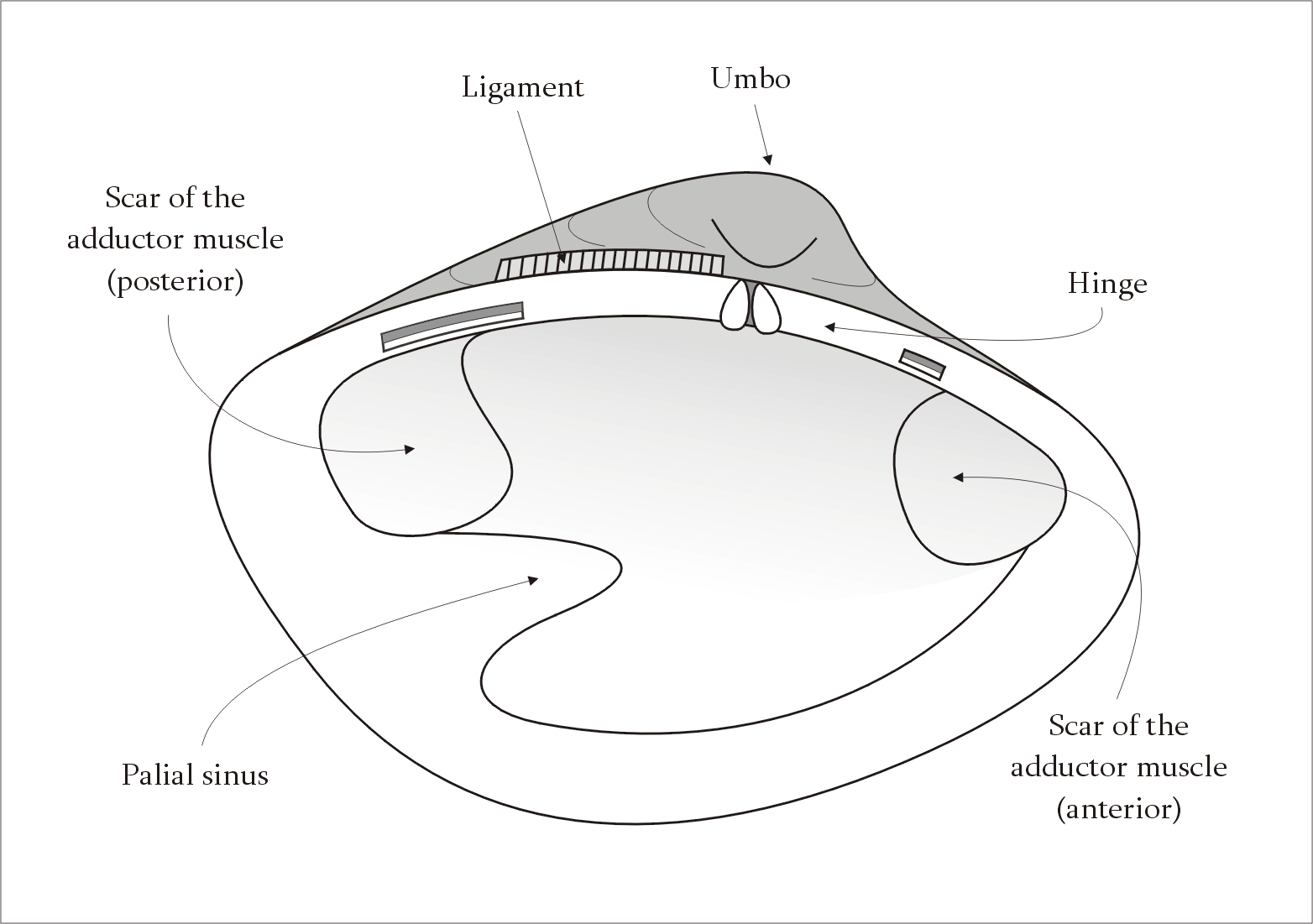
Diagrammatic drawing of structures inside one valve of the bivalve

Dreissena are filter feeders. They have both inhalant and exhalant siphons that are able to filter one Liter of water per day. They feed primarily on algae. They are able to eat microzooplankton but nothing larger.

== Invasion ==
They are one of the top invasive marine species. They have high biofouling capabilities where they can colonize water supply pipes of hydroelectric and nuclear power plants, public water plants, and industrial facilities. This can cause serious problems as they constrict water flow in the pipes. They can also colonize on the hull of boats which cause drag. Also, when they arrive in a new area they are able to outcompete the native organisms for food. This causes a change in the ecosystem of this new area. The invasion of North America was facilitated by the ability to disperse in all stages of the life cycle: passive drift of pelagic larval, yearlings detach and drift, adults attach to boat hulls and other floating objects.

== Species ==
The genus Dreissena includes the following extant species:

- Dreissena anatolica
- Dreissena bugensis, the quagga mussel (sometimes considered a subspecies of D. rostriformis)
- Dreissena caputlacus
- Dreissena carinata
- Dreissena caspia
- Dreissena gallandi
- Dreissena grimmi
- Dreissena polymorpha, the zebra mussel
- Dreissena siouffi
