= Dreissena carinata =

Conservation status
- Least Concern (IUCN 3.1)

Scientific classification
- Kingdom: Animalia
- Phylum: Mollusca
- Class: Bivalvia
- Order: Myida
- Family: Dreissenidae
- Genus: Dreissena
- Species: D. carinata

Binomial name
- Dreissena carinata (Dunker, 1853)

Synonyms
- Dreissena blanci Westerlund, 1890; Dreissena stankovici Lvova & Starobogatov, 1982

Species of bivalve

Dreissena carinata is a species of bivalves belonging to the family Dreissenidae.

Right and left valve of the same specimen:

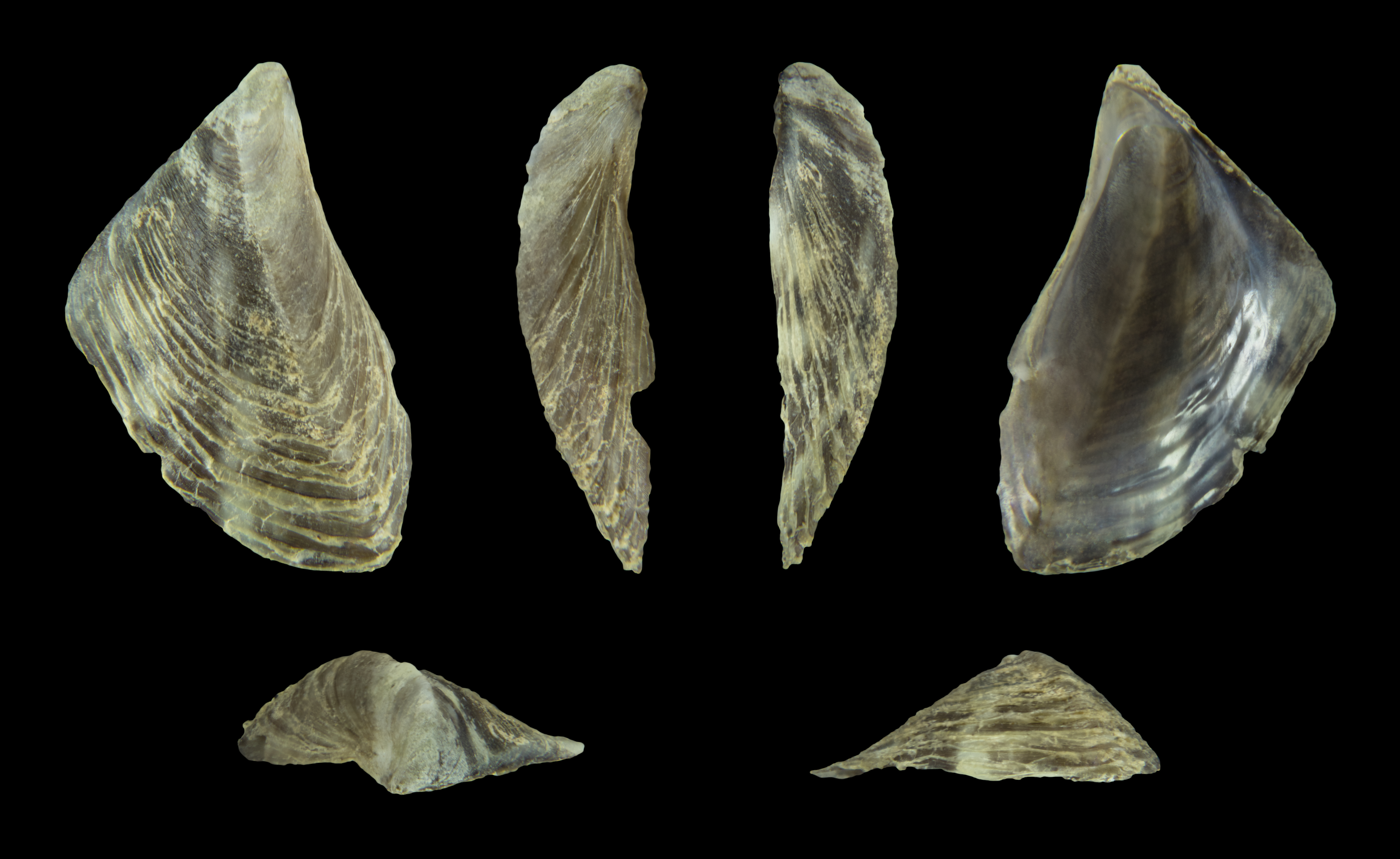
Right valve

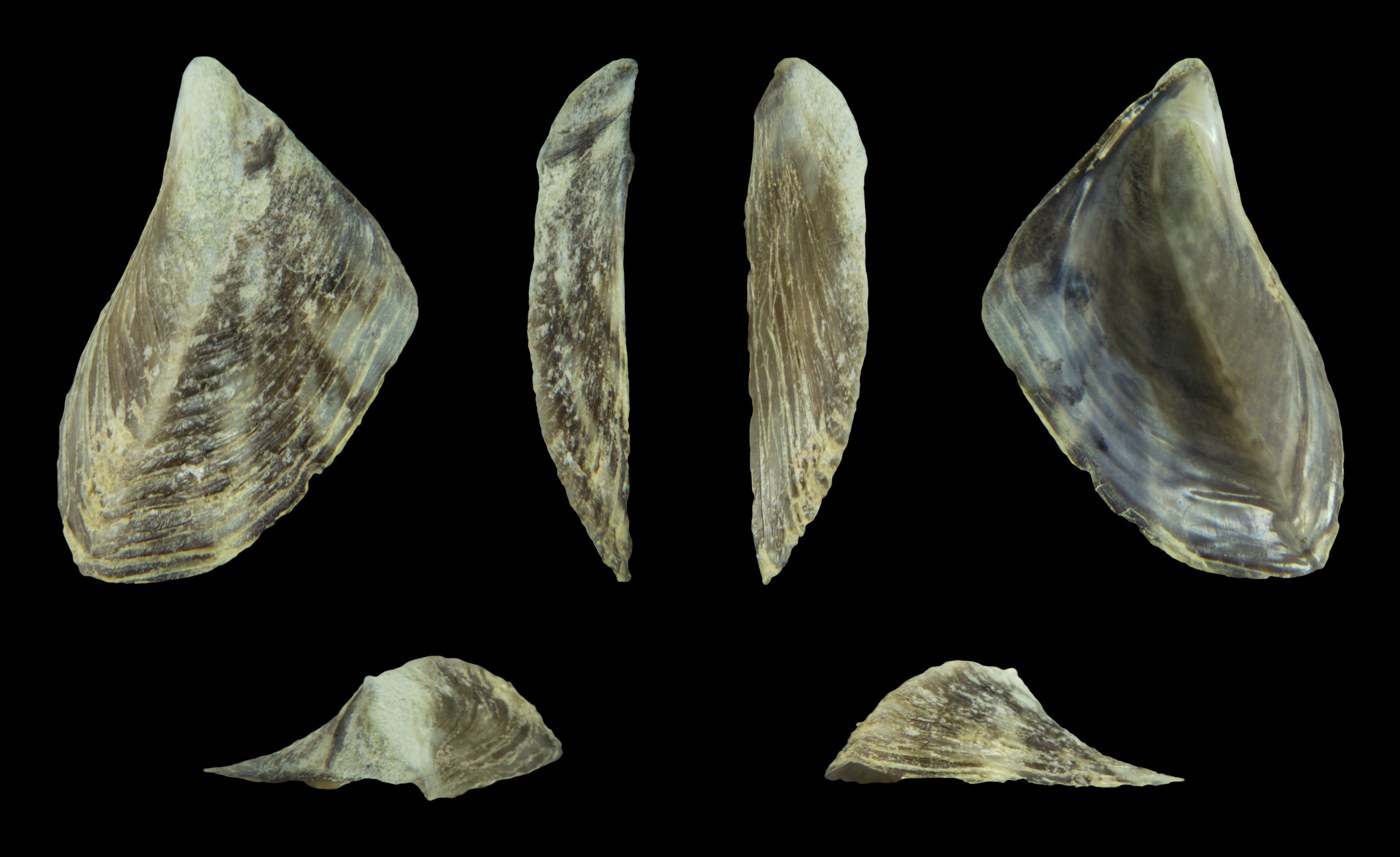
Left valve

Per IUCN, the species has the status "vulnerable".
