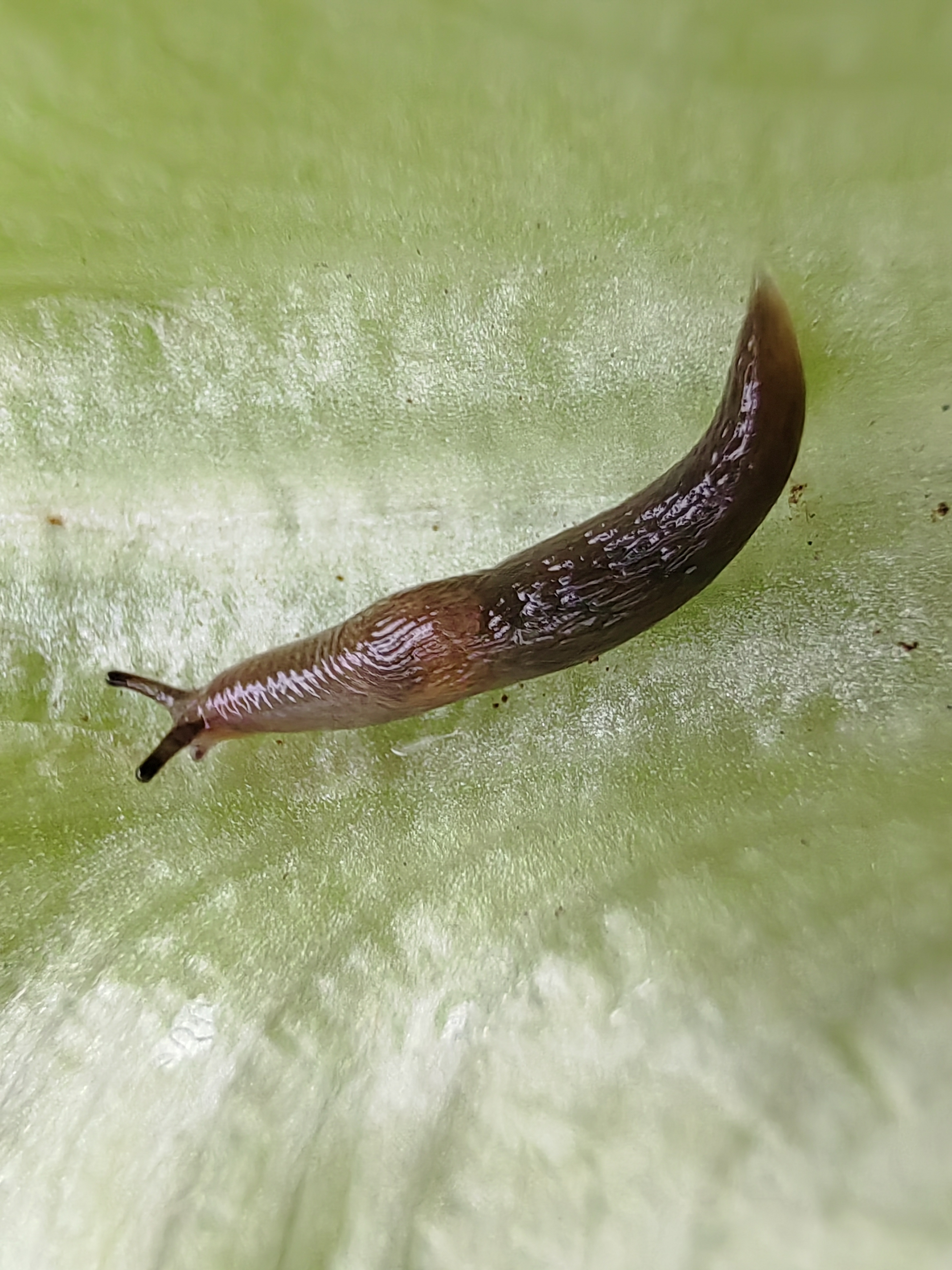

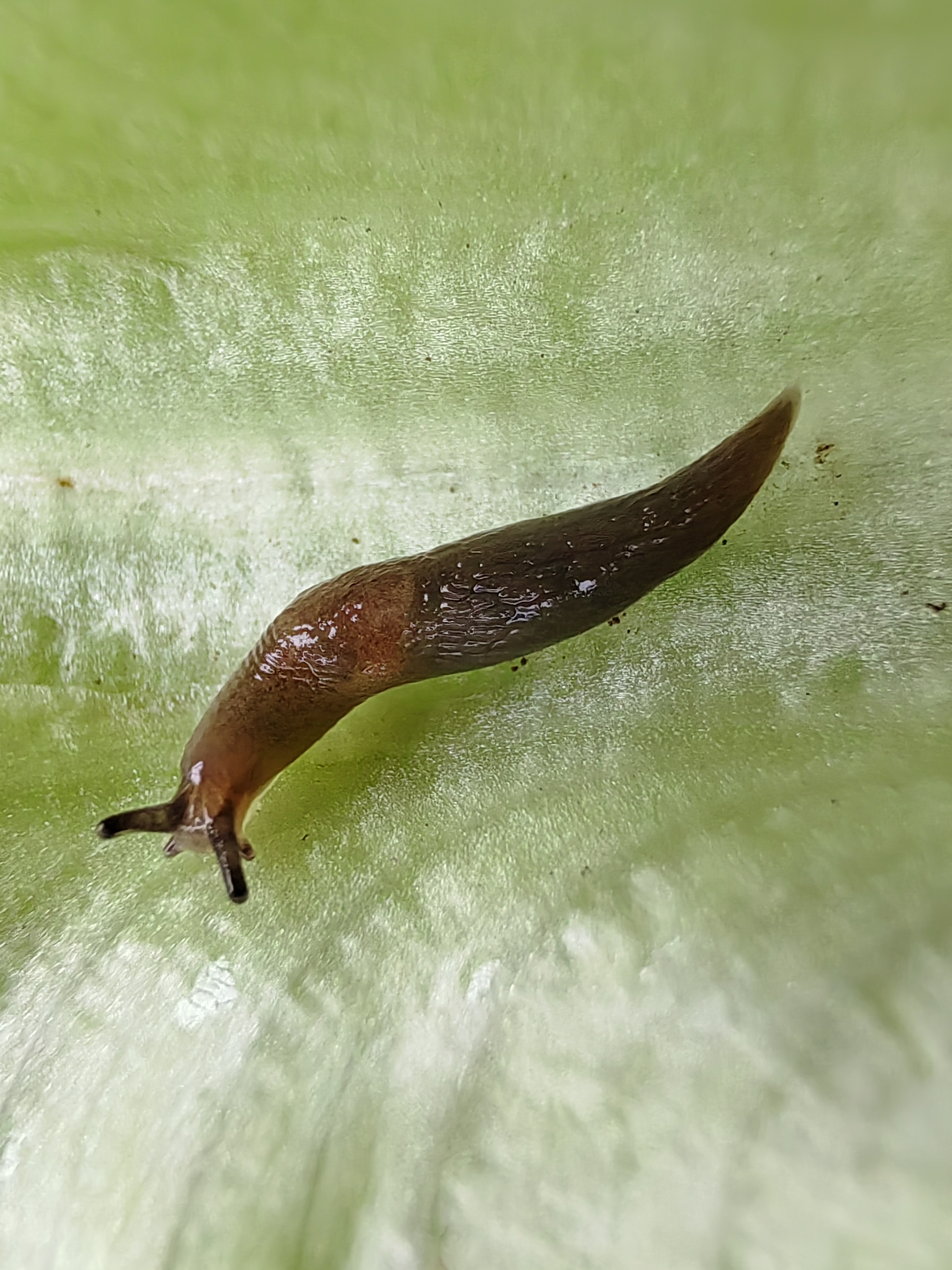

Conservation status
- Secure (NatureServe)

Scientific classification
- Kingdom: Animalia
- Phylum: Mollusca
- Class: Gastropoda
- Order: Stylommatophora
- Family: Agriolimacidae
- Genus: Deroceras
- Species: D. laeve

Binomial name
- Deroceras laeve (O. F. Müller, 1774)

Synonyms
- Limax lævis Müller, 1774; Limax brunneus Draparnaud, 1801; Limax (Deroceras?) gracilis Rafinesque, 1820; Limax campestris Binney, 1842; Limax parvulus Normand, 1852; Limax Weinlandi Heynemann, 1862; Limax araneus Gessis, 1867; Agriolimax bovenoti Collinge, 1870; Limax castaneus Ingersoll, 1875; Limax ingersolli Binney, 1875; Limax montanus Ingersoll, 1875; Limax hyperboreus Westerlund, 1876; Krynickillus montanus Nevill, 1880; Limax hemphilli Binney, 1890; Limax berendti var. pictus Cockerell, 1897; Agriolimax pseudodiocus Velichkovskiy, 1910; Agriolimax (Hydrolimax) renschi Wagner, 1934

= Deroceras laeve =

Species of gastropod

Deroceras laeve, the marsh slug (or meadow slug), is a species of small air-breathing land slug, a terrestrial pulmonate gastropod mollusk in the family Agriolimacidae.

== Distribution ==
The distribution of Deroceras laeve was originally Palearctic, from the subpolar zones to the southern margins. Today this slug species has been introduced worldwide except Antarctica, also on tropical islands such as New Guinea and on Pacific islands.

Europe:

- British Isles: Great Britain and Ireland. The species has shown little evidence for significant decline in Britain.
- Czech Republic - least concern (LC)
- Netherlands
- Poland
- Slovakia
- Ukraine
- Sweden
- Switzerland - lower concern in Switzerland
- and others

Asia:

- Pakistan
- China
- Taiwan
- India
- Vietnam

The Americas:

- California
- Costa Rica
- El Hatillo Municipality, Miranda, Venezuela
- Colombia
- introduced to Dominica (first report in 2009)
- introduced to Brazil

== Description ==
The slug is from brown to dark brown, usually with dark and characteristic but not well visible spots arranged in groups. The shape is almost cylindrical, posterior end is abruptly widened. The mantle covers 50% of body length (unusually large). There are wrinkles on skin present (may disappear in preserved slugs). Mucus is thin, colourless.

This slug is 15–25 mm long when preserved.

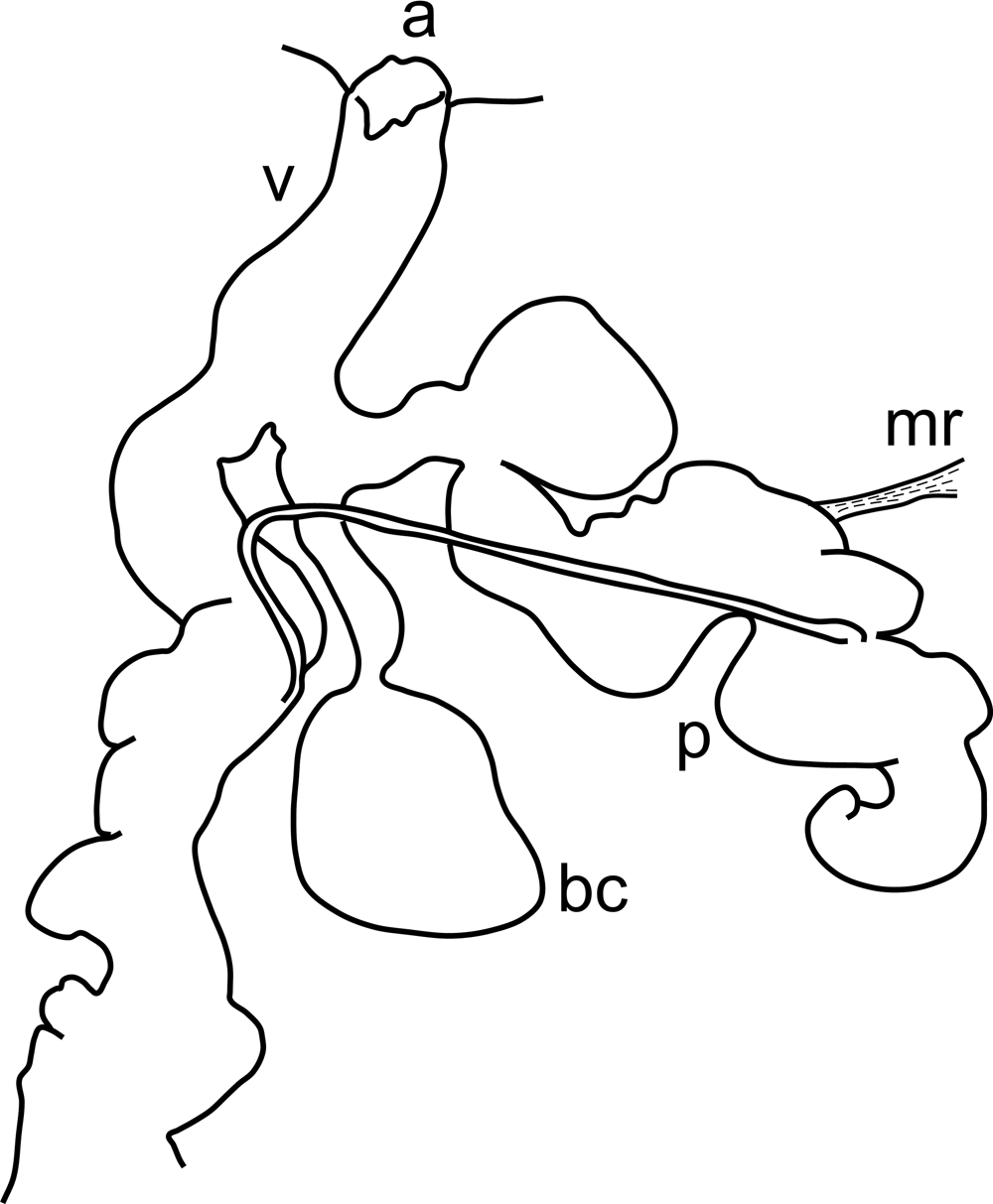
Drawing of the reproductive system of Deroceras laeve a - atrium v - vagina p - penis mr - musculus retractor penis bc - bursa copulatrix.

Reproductive system: Penis is often reduced, elongated if present, without proper penial gland but with two or more tiny glandular papillae and its end. Retractor is unforked and attached at half penis length, stimulator small, cone-shaped but looks more like a papilla. Tubular oviductus and atrium are unusually long. There is no rectal caecum.

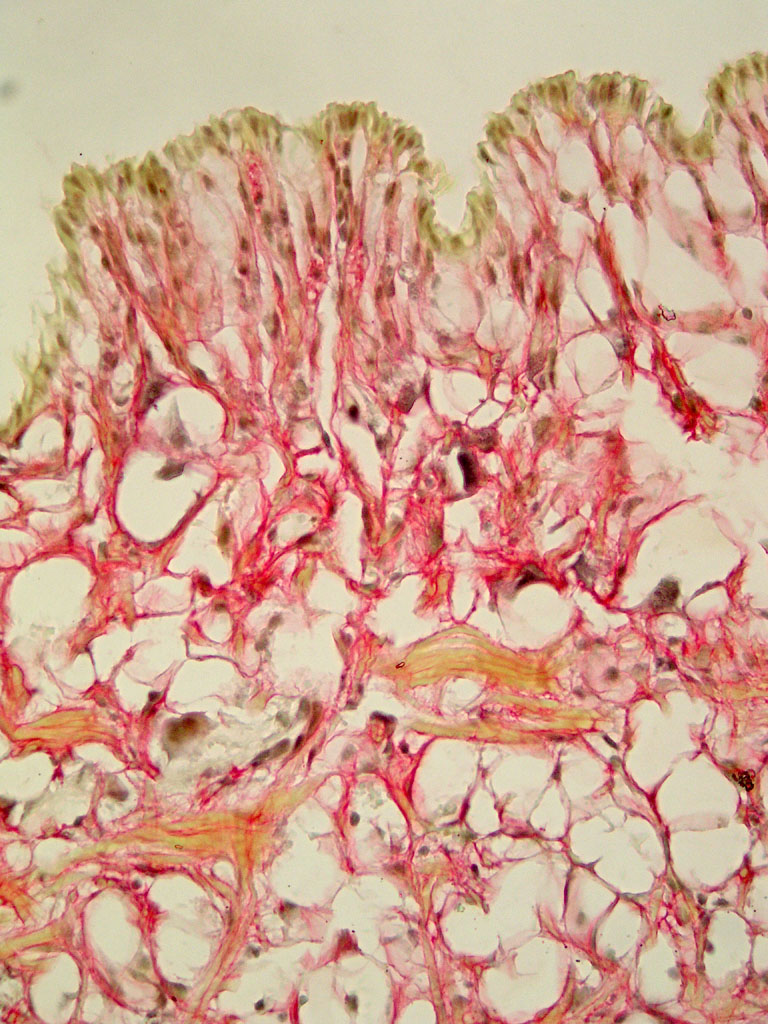
Epithelium of Deroceras laeve

== Ecology ==
=== Habitat ===
Deroceras laeve has high ecological tolerance, but needs permanently wet habitats. It is usually found in lowlands and very humid habitats, swamps, riversides, wetlands, especially alder and oak woods, marshlands and degraded areas, also greenhouses, often near water under wood or detritus. It tolerates subpolar and tropical temperatures. Newly created habitats are often colonized after a few years. In Switzerland in up to 1800 m altitude, but usually below 1000 m, in Bulgaria in up to 2500 m.

Deroceras laeve can be a serious pest in greenhouses. On the other hand, the species is threatened by continuous elimination of wet habitats by drainage, construction projects and road construction.

It is the only land gastropod that goes deliberately into the water and can survive for days submerged. Because of this unusual behavior, the species can be dispersed by flowing water.

=== Feeding habits ===
Deroceras laeve is omnivorous and capable of eating eggs and small insects, but tends to prefer plant matter, either alive or dead.

=== Life cycle ===
The eggs of this species are translucid and around 1.5 mm to 2 mm in diameter. The eggs can also survive when submerged; juveniles can hatch underwater and then climb to the surface. Hatching happens 2 to 4 weeks after the eggs are laid. The slugs are about 3 mm to 5 mm long when they hatch. They are translucid with a pink tint.

The life cycle is extremely short, and can take place within less than a month. This species can have up to 5 generations in a year, with several generations alive at the same time. Frequently there are forms with a reduced penis, which reproduce by self-fertilisation. The maximum age of this slug is not more than 1 year.

=== Parasites ===
Parasites of Deroceras laeve include:

- Parelaphostrongylus tenuis

=== Genome ===
Deroceras laeve has 31 chromosomes and around 1.9 Gigabases in its nuclear DNA which contains 24,337 protein-coding genes. The distribution of genes within the genome is consistent with a whole genome duplication in stylommatophora. Most of the genome consists of transposable elements and low-complexity repeat sequences. Small RNA pathways such as microRNAs and piwi-interacting RNAs are also present in this species.
