= List of non-marine molluscs of Afghanistan =

Location of Afghanistan

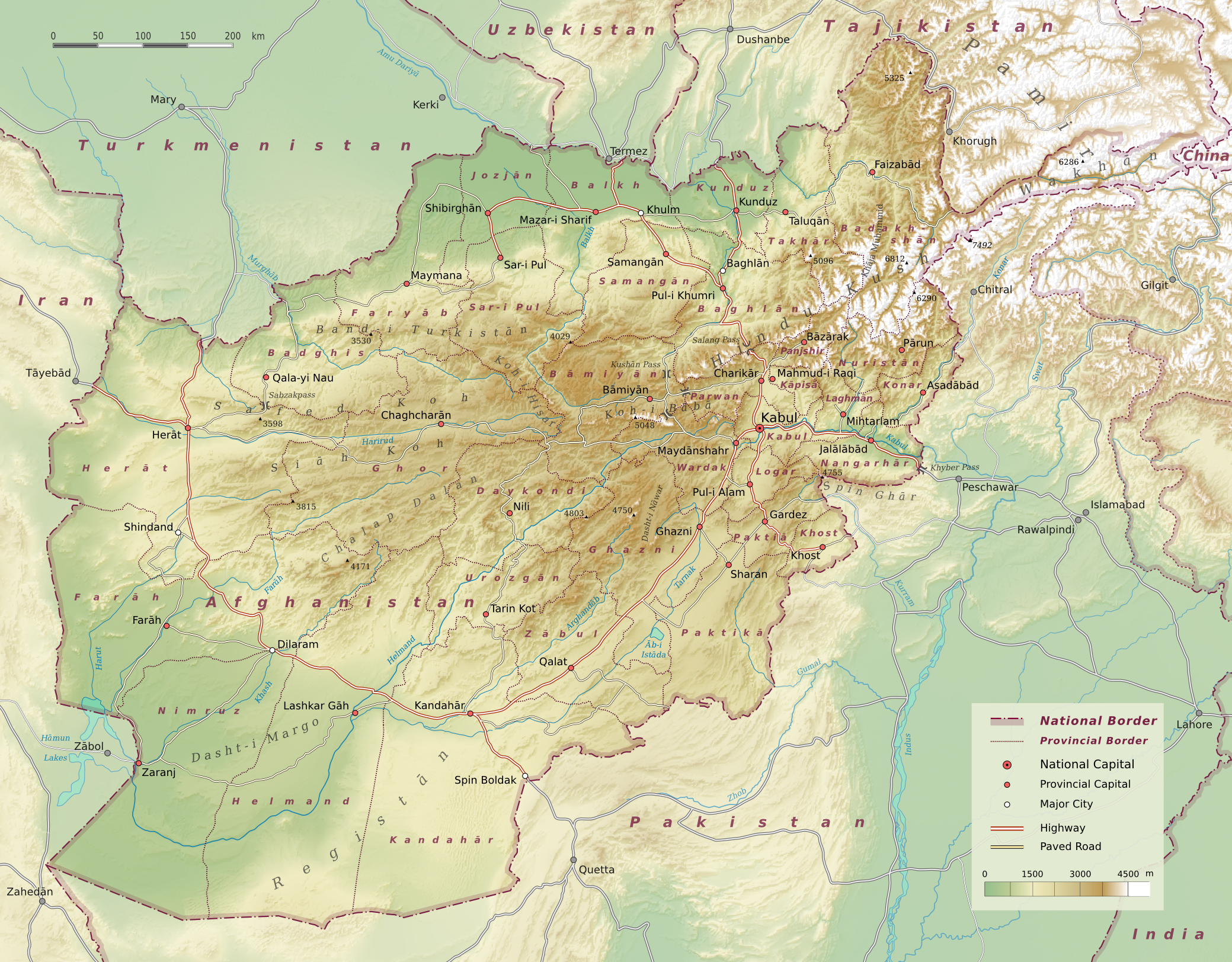
The topography of Afghanistan: the Hindu Kush mountains are a large part of the country.

The non-marine molluscs of Afghanistan are a part of the wildlife of Afghanistan. Afghanistan is land-locked and has no marine molluscs, only land and freshwater species, including snails, slugs, and freshwater bivalves. The molluscan fauna of the country is poorly known and contains over 70 molluscan taxa.

== History of malacozoology of Afghanistan ==
The earliest reports on Afghanistan molluscs consists of scattered descriptions of materials gathered on various military expeditions. Only the reports of Thomas Hutton (zoologist) (1834, 1849–1850), who recorded 21 species, and César Marie Félix Ancey (1893), who listed 27 taxa, are at all comprehensive. Nelson Annandale & Baini Prashad (1919) issued a voluminous report on freshwater collections from the southwestern deserts, and Jaeckel (1956) recorded 27 species taken by an entomological survey team (see Klapperich, 1954). Jaeckel (1956) summarized previous work, evaluated records, and concluded that there were 37 species known from Afghanistan. Ilya Mikhailovich Likharev & Yaroslav Igorevich Starobogatov (1967) had available extensive materials taken from 127 collecting stations between 1957 and 1962. Their report covered 53 species represented by new material, with an additional 14 names carried over from earlier reports, but not verified from their collecting.

Alan Solem have reported 10 new taxa (3 newly described species and 6 found species) that were previously not known from Afghanistan in 1979. Up to 1979, 73 taxa of molluscs have been recorded from Afghanistan.

It is obvious that knowledge of the Afghanistan molluscan fauna is in a very preliminary stage. The same statements apply to surrounding areas, with the exception of Turkmenistan, Uzbekistan and Tajikistan in the north (that were part of the U.S.S.R. at that time), where the summary volumes of Likharev & Rammel'meier (1962) and Anatoliy Alexeyevich Schileyko (1978) provide a solid basis of comparative knowledge. The probability of additional taxa existing is very high, particularly among the Helicoidea and Enidae. Since the Street collections (from Street Expedition of 1962-1963) were made incidentally to mammal collecting, the relatively high percentage of unrecorded taxa suggests that only the tip of Afghanistan molluscan diversity has been sampled. In the 2000s the molluscan fauna is still incompletely known (also with the neighbouring Iran).

== Freshwater gastropods ==
Viviparidae

- Bellamya hilmendensis (Kobelt, 1908)

Bithyniidae

- Gabbia sistanica (Annandale & Prashad, 1919)

Lymnaeidae

- Galba truncatula (Müller, 1774)
- Lymnaea bactriana (Hutton, 1849)
- Lymnaea gedrosiana (Annandale & Prashad, 1919)
- Radix auricularia (Linnaeus, 1758)

Planorbidae

- Anisus convexiusculus (Hutton, 1849)
- Gyraulus euphraticus (Mousson, 1874)
- Indoplanorbis exustus (Deshayes, 1834)
- Polypylis calathus (Benson, 1850)

== Land gastropods ==
Succineidae

- Oxyloma indica (Pfeiffer, 1849)
- Oxyloma elegans(Risso, 1826)

Chondrinidae

- Granopupa granum (Draparnaud, 1801)
- Granaria lapidaria (Hutton, 1849)

Pupillidae

- Pupilla afghanicum Solem, 1979 - subgenus Gibbulinopsis
- Pupoides coenopictus (Hutton, 1834)

Valloniidae

- Pupisoma orcula (Benson, 1850) - non-indigenous. This Least Concern species endemic to Micronesia, but one broken specimen was found to be introduced in Afghanistan. There are no other species of molluscs listed in the 2010 IUCN Red List for Afghanistan.
- Vallonia asiatica (Nevill, 1878)
- Vallonia mionecton (O. Boettger, 1889) - Vallonia mionecton schamhalensis Rosen, 1892

Enidae

- Laevozebrinus eremita (Reeve, 1849)
- Subzebrinus tandjanensis (Kobelt, 1902)
- Subzebrinus drangianus Jaeckel, 1956
- Subzebrinus coelocentrus (Ancey, 1893)
- Subzebrinus streeti Solem, 1979
- Subzebrinus griffithsii (Benson, 1848)

Gastrodontidae

- Zonitoides nitidus (Müller, 1774)

Parmacellidae

- Candaharia rutellum (Hutton, 1849) - synonym: Parmacella (Proparmacella) rutellum (Hutton, 1849)

Ariophantidae

- Parvatella flemingi (Pfeiffer, 1857)
- Parvatella sogdianus (Martens, 1871)
- Syama cavicula Solem, 1979

Vitrinidae

- Phenacolimax conoidea (Martens, 1874) - subgenus Oligolimax

Agriolimacidae

- Lytopelte kandaharensis (Altena, 1970)

Ferussaciidae

- Cecilioides bensoni Gude, 1914 - subgenus: Geostilbia, synonym: Caecilioides bensoni

Subulinidae

- Zootecus insularis chion (Pfeiffer, 1857)

Bradybaenidae

- Bradybaena fedtschenkoi (Martens, 1874)

Hygromiidae

- Hesseola bactriana (Hutton, 1849) - synonym: Euomphalia bactriana (Hutton, 1849)
- Leucozonella rufispira (Martens, 1874)
- Xeropicta candaharica (L. Pfeiffer, 1846)

== Freshwater bivalves ==
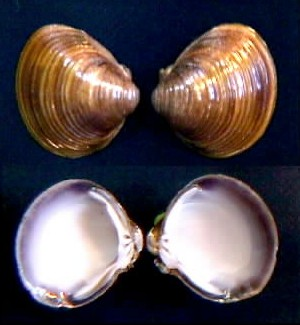
Corbicula fluminalis

Unionidae

- Lamellidens testudinarius (Spengler) var. rhadinaeus Annandale & Prashad, 1919

Corbiculidae

- Corbicula fluminalis (Müller, 1774)

== See also ==
- List of non-marine molluscs of Pakistan
- List of non-marine molluscs of Iran
- List of non-marine molluscs of Turkmenistan
- List of non-marine molluscs of Uzbekistan
- List of non-marine molluscs of Tajikistan
- List of non-marine molluscs of China
- List of non-marine molluscs of India
