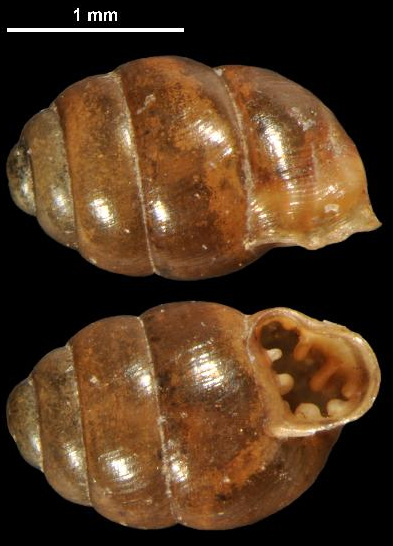
- shell of Vertigo antivertigo (specimen at MNHN, Paris)
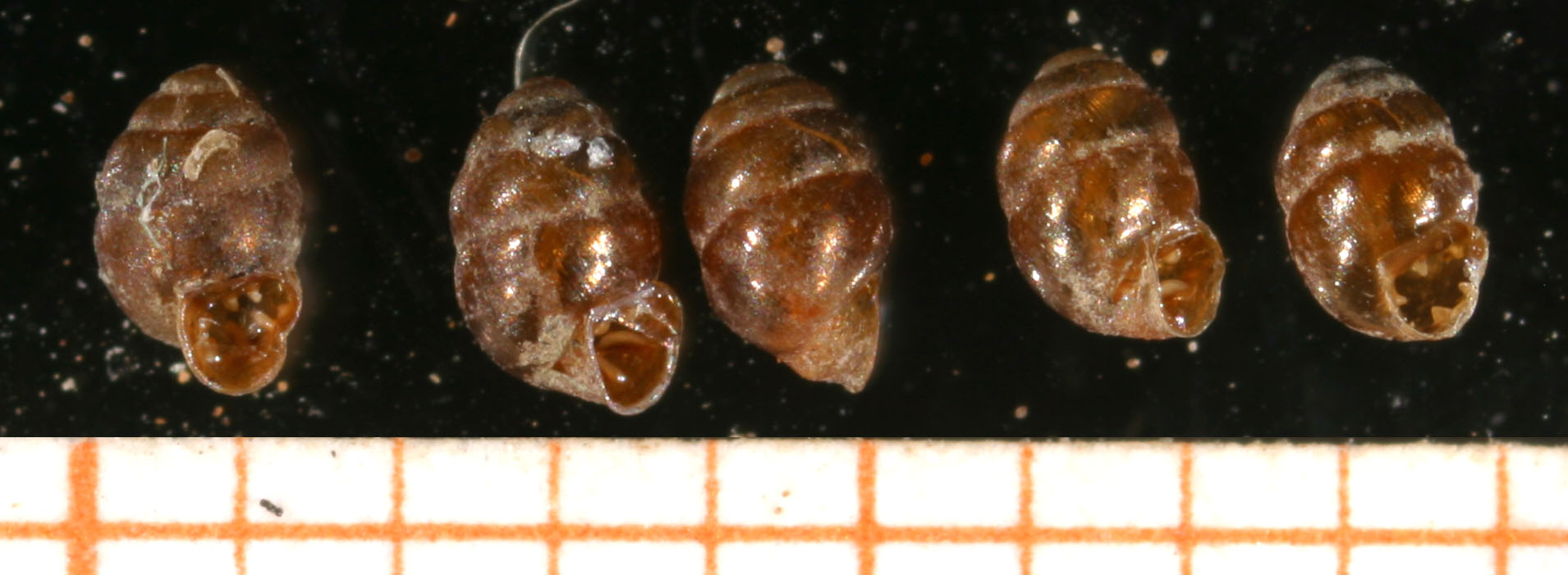
- Five shells of Vertigo antivertigo, scale in mm

Conservation status
- Least Concern (IUCN 3.1)

Scientific classification
- Kingdom: Animalia
- Phylum: Mollusca
- Class: Gastropoda
- Order: Stylommatophora
- Family: Vertiginidae
- Subfamily: Vertigininae
- Genus: Vertigo
- Species: V. antivertigo

Binomial name
- Vertigo antivertigo (Draparnaud, 1801)

Synonyms
- Alaea palustris Jeffreys, 1830 (junior synonym); Pupa antivertigo Draparnaud, 1801 (original combination); Turbo sexdentatus Montagu, 1803 (junior synonym); Vertigo (Alaea) antivertigo (Draparnaud, 1801) alternate representation; Vertigo (Vertigo) antivertigo (Draparnaud, 1801); Vertigo sinuata Mousson, 1873 (junior synonym)

= Vertigo antivertigo =

Species of gastropod

Vertigo antivertigo is a species of small air-breathing land snail, a terrestrial pulmonate gastropod mollusc or micromollusc in the family Vertiginidae, the whorl snails.

== Distribution ==
This species occurs in countries and islands including:

- Czech Republic
- Netherlands
- Poland
- Slovakia
- Ukraine
- Great Britain
- Ireland
- Pakistan

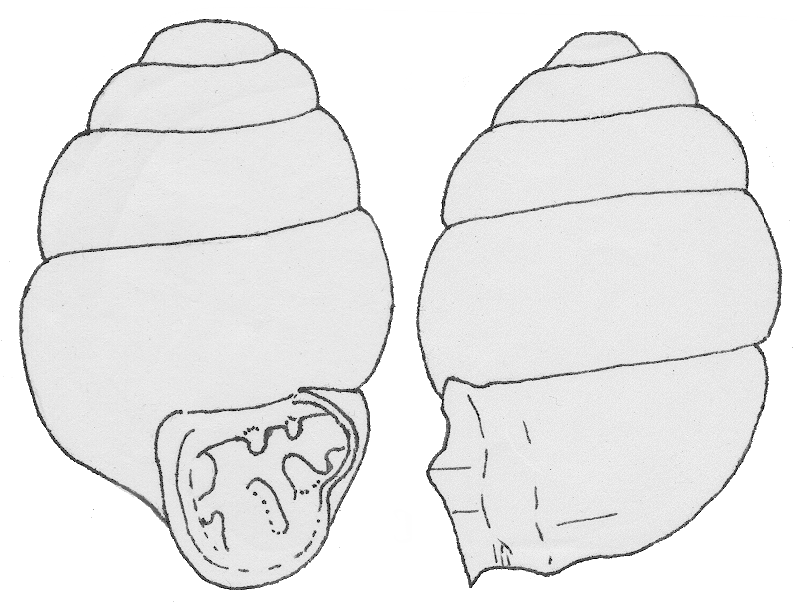
Two views of a shell of Vertigo antivertigo

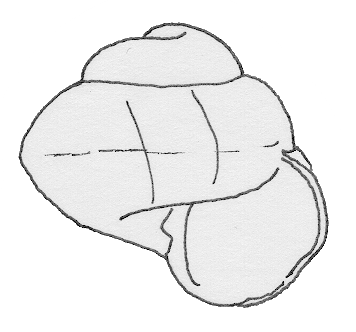
A juvenile shell of Vertigo antivertigo

== Shell description ==
The shell is rimate, oval, ventricose, nearly smooth, glossy, amber-brown or nearly chestnut, slightly transparent, outlines very convex. Whorls are rather convex, the last somewhat compressed below, with an impression over the lower palatal fold, a moderately developed, opaque crest behind the peristome; and a very deep impression between the crest and the point of the outer lip.

Aperture having 6 principal and usually several smaller teeth: parietal lamella rather long; angular and infraparietal short and smaller. Columellar lamella large, ascending inwardly. Upper and lower palatal folds strong, the lower longer. Basal fold stout, in a subcolumellar position. Usually there are small suprapalatal and infrapalatal denticles. Peristome is thin, a little expanded, the outer margin biarcuate, with a median entering angle. Palatal callus is well developed.

The width of the adult shell varies from 1.2 to 1.4 mm, the height from 1.95 to 2.25 mm.
