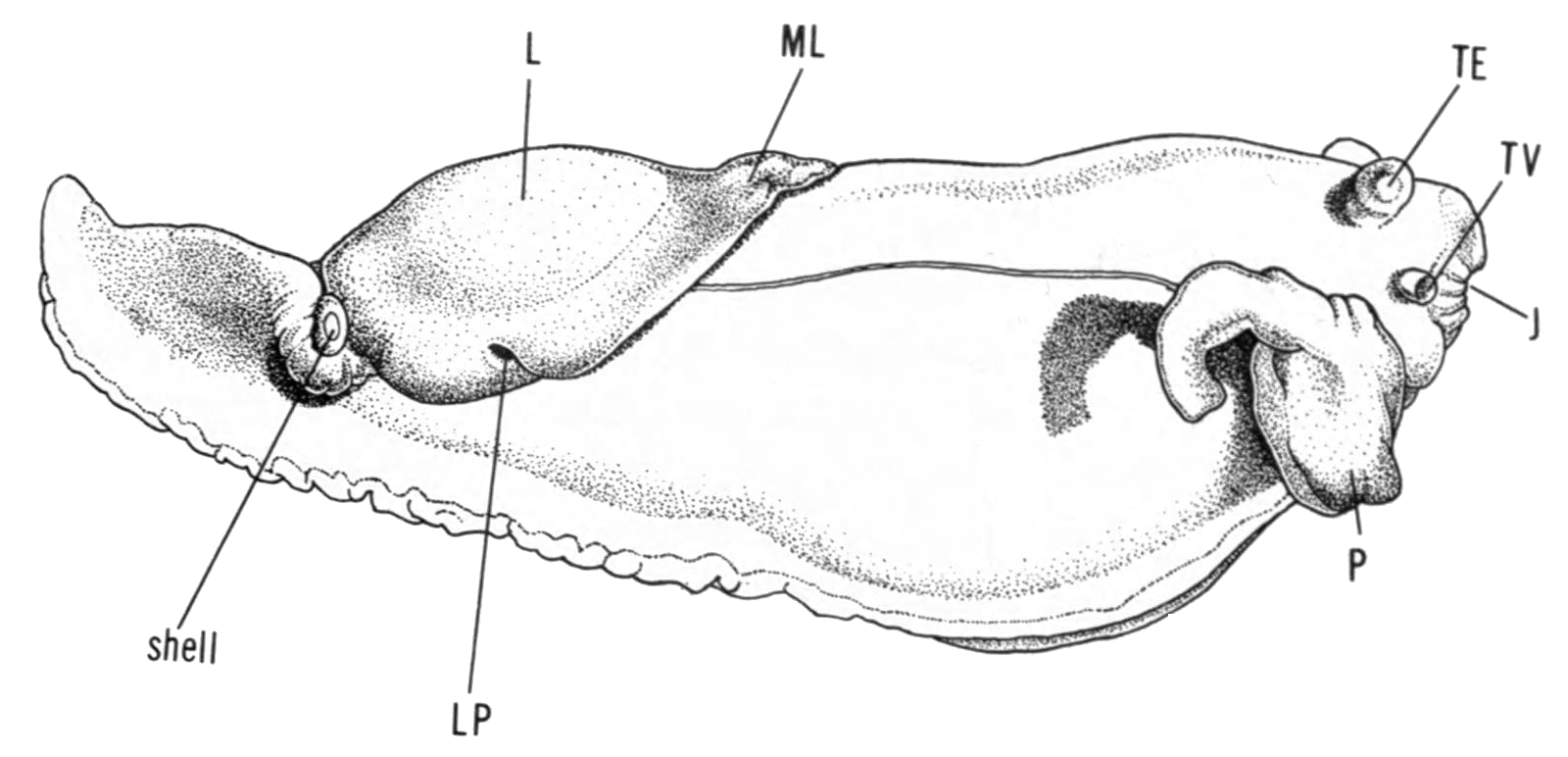
- Drawing of lateral view of preserved specimen of Candaharia rutellum

Scientific classification
- Kingdom: Animalia
- Phylum: Mollusca
- Class: Gastropoda
- Order: Stylommatophora
- Family: Parmacellidae
- Genus: Candaharia; Godwin-Austen, 1888

= Candaharia =

Genus of gastropods

Candaharia is a genus of air-breathing land slugs, terrestrial gastropod mollusks in the family Parmacellidae.

== Species ==
Species within the genus Candaharia include:

subgenus Candaharia

- Candaharia rutellum (Hutton, 1849) - type species

subgenus Levanderiella Schileyko, 2007

- Candaharia levanderi (Simroth, 1901)

subgenus ?

- Candaharia aethiops (Westerlund, 1896)
- Candaharia izzatullaevi Likharev & Wiktor, 1980
