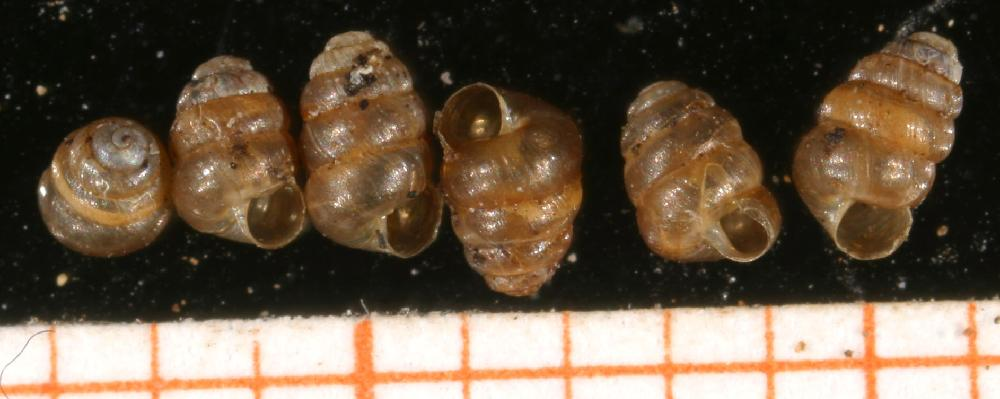
- Six shells of Columella edentula, scale bar in mm

Scientific classification
- Kingdom: Animalia
- Phylum: Mollusca
- Class: Gastropoda
- Order: Stylommatophora
- Family: Truncatellinidae
- Genus: Columella; Westerlund, 1878

Type species
- Pupa inornata Michaud, 1831

Synonyms
- Edentulina Clessin, 1876; Paludinella R. T. Lowe, 1852

= Columella (genus) =

Genus of gastropods

Columella is a genus of very small, air-breathing land snails, terrestrial pulmonate gastropod mollusks in the family Truncatellinidae, the whorl snails and allies.

== Taxonomy ==
Columella is commonly classified within the Vertiginidae. However, as shown by Nekola & Coles (2016), the genus is not that closely related to the Vertiginidae, but may rather be affiliated with the Chondrinidae or form a pupilloid family of its own. A systematic revision is pending.

== Species ==
Species within the genus Columella include:

- Columella acicularis Almuhambetova, 1979
- Columella aspera Waldén, 1966
- Columella columella (G. v. Martens, 1830)
- Columella edentula (Draparnaud, 1805) - toothless column
- †Columella hartmutnordsiecki Schlickum & Geissert, 1980
- Columella hasta (Hanna, 1911)
- Columella intermedia Schileyko & Almuhambetova, 1984
- Columella microspora (R.T. Lowe, 1852)
- Columella nymphaepratensis Hlaváč & Pokryszko, 2009
- Columella polvonense (Pilsbry, 1894)
- Columella simplex (Gould, 1840)
- Columella talgarica Schileyko & Rymzhanov, 2010
- †Columella wyciski Schlickum & Strauch, 1972

Species brought into synonymy

- Columella inornata (Michaud, 1831): synonym of Columella edentula (Draparnaud, 1805) (junior synonym)
- Columella ninagongonis Pilsbry, 1935: synonym of Truncatellina ninagongonis (Pilsbry, 1935) (original combination)
- Columella tridentata A. B. Leonard, 1946: synonym of Gastrocopta ruidosensis (Cockerell, 1899)
