= Dreissena caspia =

Conservation status
- Critically endangered, possibly extinct (IUCN 3.1)

Scientific classification
- Domain: Eukaryota
- Kingdom: Animalia
- Phylum: Mollusca
- Class: Bivalvia
- Order: Myida
- Family: Dreissenidae
- Genus: Dreissena
- Species: D. caspia

Binomial name
- Dreissena caspia Eichwald, 1855

Synonyms
- Dreissena eichwaldi Issel, 1865

Species of bivalve

Dreissena caspia is a species of bivalves belonging to the family Dreissenidae.

The species is found in Central Asia.
