= List of non-marine molluscs of Kyrgyzstan =

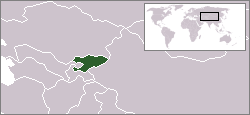
Location of Kyrgyzstan

The non-marine mollusks of Kyrgyzstan are a part of the molluscan fauna of Kyrgyzstan (wildlife of Kyrgyzstan). A number of species of non-marine mollusks are found in the wild in Kyrgyzstan.

== Freshwater gastropods ==
Hydrobiidae

- Pseudocaspia issykkulensis (Clessin, 1894)
- Chirgisia alaarchaensis Glöer, Boeters & Pešić, 2014

Valvatidae

- Valvata piscinalis (O. F. Müller, 1774)
- Valvata macrostoma Mörch, 1864

Lymnaeidae

- Lymnaea stagnalis (Linnaeus, 1758)
- Lymnaea kashmirensis Prashad, 1925
- Radix auricularia (Linnaeus, 1758)
- Radix ovata (Draparnaud, 1805)
- Radix cf. hookeri (Reeve, 1850)
- Radix obliquata (Martens, 1864)
- Radix lagotis (Schrank, 1803)
- Radix balthica (Linnaeus, 1758)
- Galba truncatula (O. F. Müller, 1774)

Planorbidae

- Planorbis planorbis (Linnaeus, 1758)
- Planorbis carinatus O. F. Müller, 1774
- Planorbis intermixtus Mousson, 1874
- Anisus issykulensis (Clessin, 1907)
- Gyraulus acutus Clessin, 1907
- Gyraulus acronicus (A. Férussac, 1807)
- Gyraulus laevis (Alder, 1838)
- Gyraulus chinensis (Dunker, 1848)
- Planorbarius corneus (Linnaeus, 1758)

Acroloxidae

- Ancylastrum ovatum Clessin, 1907
- Ancylastrum issykulense Clessin, 1907
- Ancylastrum turkestanicum Clessin, 1907
- Ancylastrum dextrorsum Clessin, 1907

Physidae

- Physella acuta (Draparnaud, 1805)

== Land gastropods ==
Bradybaenidae

- Fruticicola lantzi (Lindholm, 1927)
- Fruticicola sinistrorsa Tsvetkov, 1938

== Freshwater bivalves ==
Sphaeriidae

- Pisidium casertanum (Poli, 1791)
- Pisidium obtusale (Lamarck, 1818)

== See also ==
- List of non-marine molluscs of China
- List of non-marine molluscs of Kazakhstan
- List of non-marine molluscs of Tajikistan
- List of non-marine molluscs of Uzbekistan
