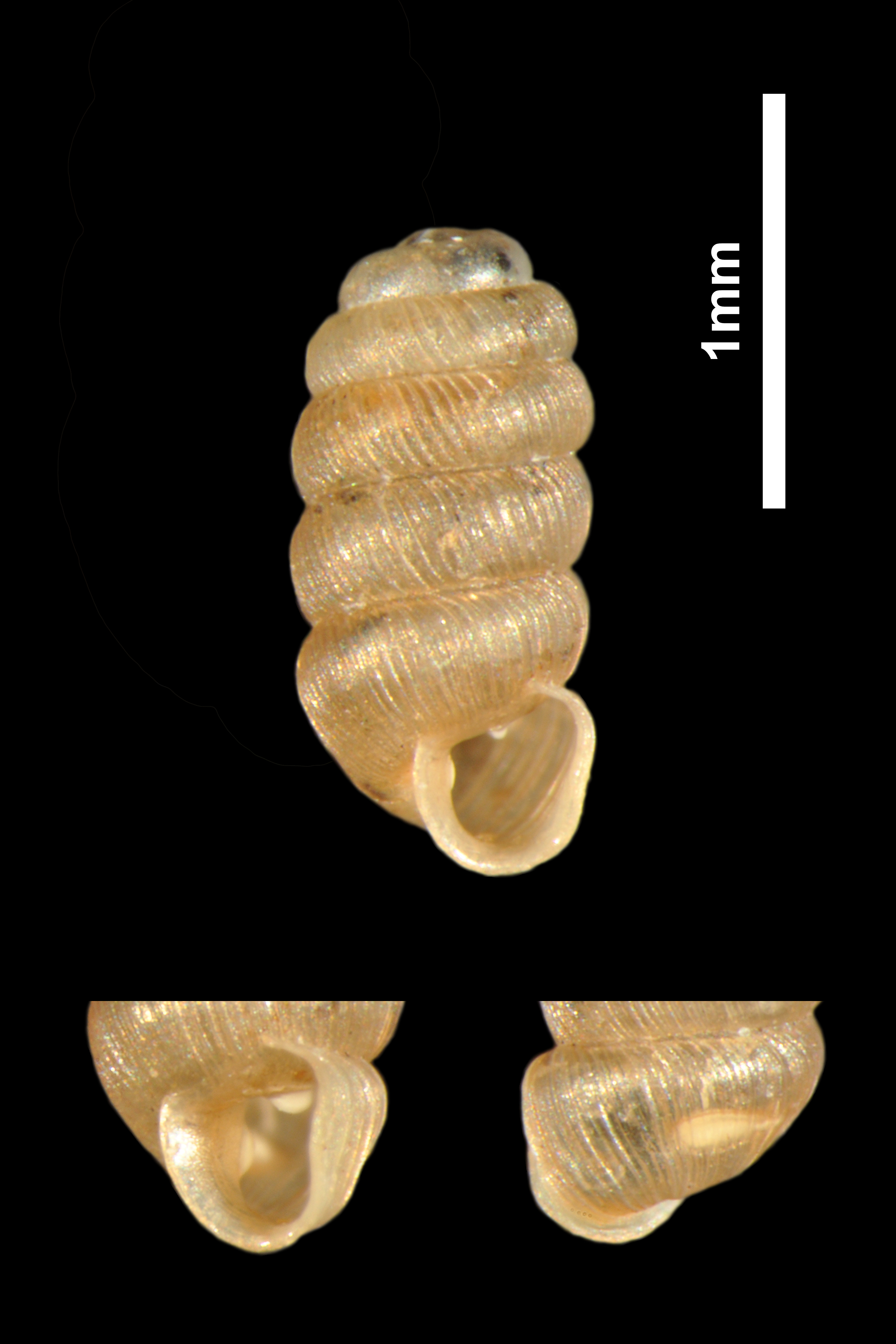
- Shell of Truncatellina claustralis (specimen at MNHN, Paris)

Scientific classification
- Kingdom: Animalia
- Phylum: Mollusca
- Class: Gastropoda
- Order: Stylommatophora
- Suborder: Helicina
- Infraorder: Pupilloidei
- Superfamily: Chondrinoidea; Steenberg, 1925

Families
- See text

= Chondrinoidea =

Superfamily of gastropods

Chondrinoidea is a superfamily of small air-breathing land snails and terrestrial mollusks in the infraorder Pupilloidei.

== Families ==
- Chondrinidae Steenberg, 1925
- Truncatellinidae Steenberg, 1925

Synonyms

- Subfamily Columellinae Schileyko, 1998: synonym of Truncatellinidae Steenberg, 1925
