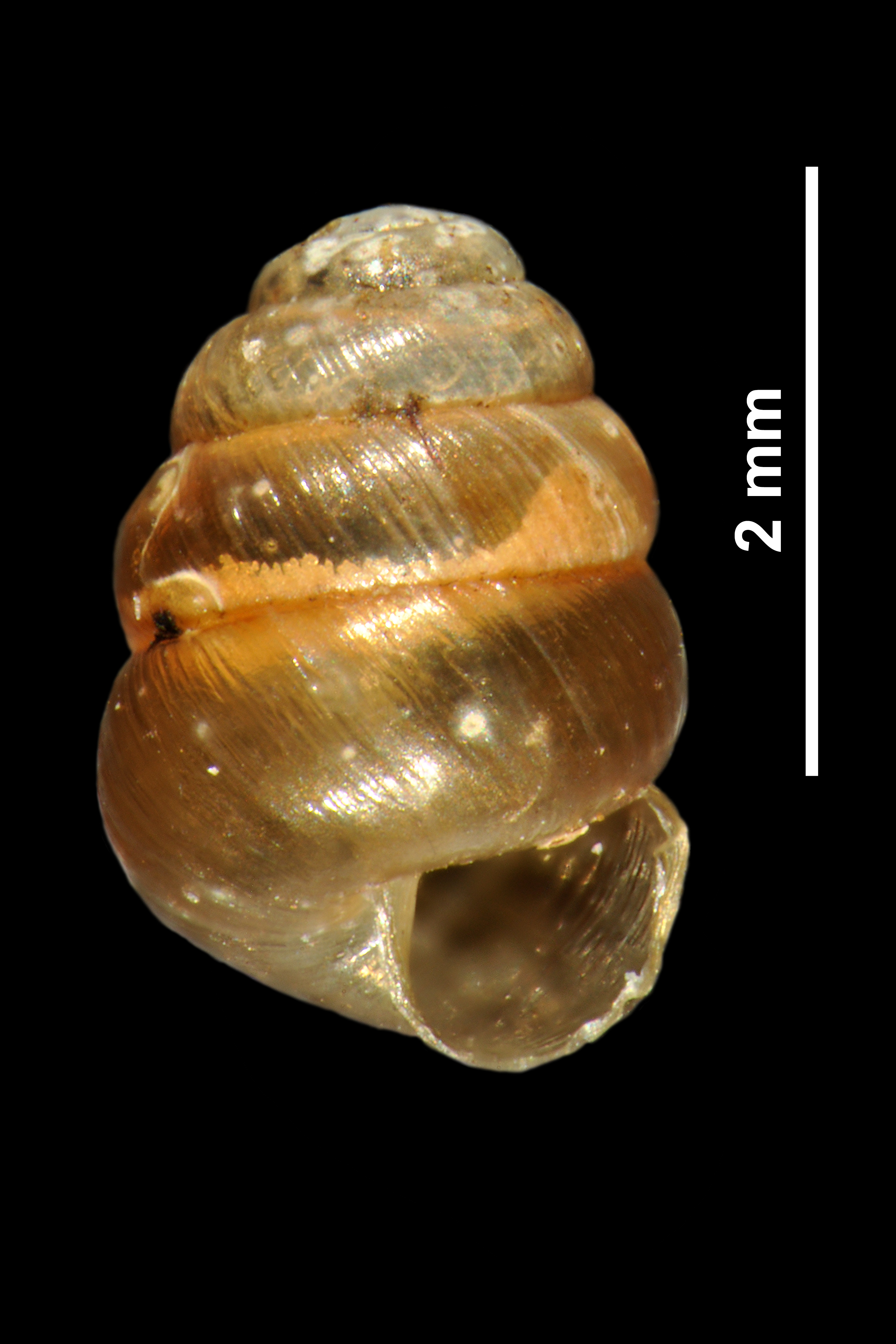
- Shell of Columella aspera (specimen at MNHN, Paris)

Scientific classification
- Kingdom: Animalia
- Phylum: Mollusca
- Class: Gastropoda
- Order: Stylommatophora
- Superfamily: Chondrinoidea
- Family: Truncatellinidae; Steenberg, 1925

= Truncatellinidae =

Family of gastropods

Truncatellinidae is a family of small, air-breathing land snails, terrestrial pulmonate gastropod molluscs or micromollusks in the superfamily Chondrinoidea.

== Genera ==
- Columella Westerlund, 1878
- Negulus O. Boettger, 1889
- Truncatellina R. T. Lowe, 1852

Genera brought into synonymy

- Edentulina Clessin, 1876: synonym of Columella Westerlund, 1878
- Franzia Blume, 1965: synonym of Truncatellina R. T. Lowe, 1852 (junior primary homonym of Franzia Jordan & Thompson, 1914)
- Laurinella P. Hesse, 1915: synonym of Truncatellina R. T. Lowe, 1852
- Paludinella R. T. Lowe, 1852: synonym of Columella Westerlund, 1878
