= List of Sphaerium species =

As of July 2024, about 180 species are accepted in the genus Sphaerium.

== A ==
- Sphaerium acuminatum (Prime, 1852)
- †Sphaerium aequale L. S. Russell, 1926
- Sphaerium aequatoriale Clessin, 1879
- †Sphaerium aktschagylicum A. A. Ali-Zade & Kabakova, 1969
- Sphaerium alticola Kobelt, 1913
- †Sphaerium altiformis B.-Y. Huang & X.-Q. Zhang, 1982
- Sphaerium amurensis (Moskvicheva, 1986)
- †Sphaerium andersonianum Hannibal, 1912
- †Sphaerium anderssoni (Grabau, 1923)
- †Sphaerium angulare K. Martin, 1885
- †Sphaerium antiqum Z.-W. Gu, 1976
- †Sphaerium aquilonarum Dall, 1924
- Sphaerium argentinum (A. d'Orbigny, 1835)
- Sphaerium asiaticum (E. von Martens, 1864)
- Sphaerium austeni Prashad, 1921
- Sphaerium avanum Theobald, 1874

== B ==
- Sphaerium baicalense W. Dybowski, 1902
- †Sphaerium beckmani L. S. Russell, 1976
- Sphaerium bequaerti (Dautzenberg & Germain, 1914)
- †Sphaerium bertereauae Fontannes, 1884
- †Sphaerium blancheti Locard, 1893
- †Sphaerium bristovii (Forbes, 1856)

== C ==
- Sphaerium cambaraense Mansur, Meier-Brook & Ituarte, 2008
- Sphaerium capense (Krauss, 1848)
- †Sphaerium capillaceum Lindholm, 1932
- †Sphaerium castrense Noulet, 1857
- †Sphaerium catherinae Hannibal, 1912
- Sphaerium cecilae Prashad, 1921
- †Sphaerium chaganhuensis G.-X. Zhu, 1976
- †Sphaerium chientaoense K. Suzuki, 1941
- †Sphaerium coreanicum (T. Kobayashi & K. Suzuki, 1936)
- Sphaerium corneum (Linnaeus, 1758) – European fingernail clam
- †Sphaerium cynodon G. D. Hanna, 1923

== D ==
- †Sphaerium dagardiense (Oppenheim, 1919)
- Sphaerium davisi (Bartsch, 1908)
- †Sphaerium dayaoense Q.-H. Ma, 1976
- †Sphaerium discus Pierce, 2001
- Sphaerium dybowskii Lindholm, 1909

== E ==
- †Sphaerium ellipticoides B.-D. Shi, 1982
- †Sphaerium exilisum B.-Y. Huang & X.-Q. Zhang, 1982

== F ==
- †Sphaerium fabale (Prime, 1852)
- †Sphaerium fengxianense B.-D. Shi, 1982
- †Sphaerium florissantense T. D. A. Cockerell, 1906
- Sphaerium forbesii (R. A. Philippi, 1869)
- †Sphaerium fowleri L. S. Russell, 1931
- †Sphaerium fujianense J.-G. Sha, 1992
- †Sphaerium fulungchuanense K. Suzuki, 1942

== G ==
- †Sphaerium gemma Dall, 1924
- †Sphaerium gerdae (V. Anistratenko, 1991)
- †Sphaerium gibberum B.-Y. Huang & X.-Q. Zhang, 1982
- †Sphaerium gibbosum (J. De C. Sowerby, 1829)
- †Sphaerium gietzi Tozer, 1956
- †Sphaerium gozhiki (Datsenko, 1990)
- †Sphaerium groenlandensis Yen, 1958
- †Sphaerium grosiformis G.-X. Zhu, 1976

== H ==
- Sphaerium haasi C. R. Boettger, 1915
- Sphaerium hartmanni (Jickeli, 1874)
- †Sphaerium heissbaueri Hölzl, 1953
- †Sphaerium herringtoni Pierce, 1993
- †Sphaerium heskethense Warren, 1926
- Sphaerium heterodon Pilsbry, 1895
- †Sphaerium hulagouensis J.-S. Yu & P.-Y. Yao, 1986
- †Sphaerium huobashanense B.-L. Ding, 1982

== I ==
- †Sphaerium icenicum D. T. Holyoak & Preece, 1986
- †Sphaerium idahoense Meek, 1870
- Sphaerium incomitatum (Kuiper, 1966)
- Sphaerium incurvum (Guppy, 1872)
- Sphaerium indicum Deshayes, 1855
- †Sphaerium inflatum M.-C. Chow, 1953
- †Sphaerium inflatum (V. Anistratenko, 1991)

== J–K ==
- Sphaerium japonicum (Westerlund, 1883)
- †Sphaerium jianchangense J.-S. Yu, G.-Y. Dong & P.-Y. Yao, 1987
- †Sphaerium kailuense Z.-W. Gu, 1999
- Sphaerium kashmirensis Prashad, 1937
- †Sphaerium kazuoense J.-S. Yu, G.-Y. Dong & P.-Y. Yao, 1987
- Sphaerium kendricki Kuiper, 1983
- †Sphaerium kettlemanense Arnold, 1909
- Sphaerium korotniewii W. Dybowski, 1902
- †Sphaerium krasnenkovi (V. Anistratenko & Starobogatov, 1990)
- †Sphaerium kustovica (Tolstikova, 1973)

== L ==
- Sphaerium lacusedes (Iredale, 1943)
- Sphaerium lacustre (O. F. Müller, 1774)
- †Sphaerium laiyangense J.-H. Chen, 1984
- †Sphaerium langxiense Q.-H. Ma, 1980
- Sphaerium lauricochae (R. A. Philippi, 1869)
- †Sphaerium lentum Pierce, 2014
- †Sphaerium liburnicum (Stache, 1889)
- Sphaerium limanicum (Moskvicheva, 1986)
- †Sphaerium livingstonense L. S. Russell, 1932
- †Sphaerium lortetianum Locard, 1883

== M ==
- Sphaerium madagascariense (Tristram, 1863)
- †Sphaerium maillardi Locard, 1893
- †Sphaerium malheurense J. Henderson & Rodeck, 1934
- Sphaerium marisminus Starobogatov, 1986
- Sphaerium martensi Pilsbry, 1899
- †Sphaerium martinsoni (Tolstikova, 1973)
- †Sphaerium matejici Pavlović, 1933
- †Sphaerium mclearni L. S. Russell, 1932
- Sphaerium mexicanum Dall, 1905
- †Sphaerium miocaenicum (Neubauer & Harzhauser, 2014)
- Sphaerium miyadii Mori, 1933
- Sphaerium mohasicum Thiele, 1911
- Sphaerium montanum Tapparone Canefri, 1889
- †Sphaerium morozi (Datsenko, 1990)
- †Sphaerium mulingense J.-G. Sha & Fürsich, 1992

== N ==
- †Sphaerium nevadense D. W. Taylor, 1981
- Sphaerium nitidum Clessin, 1876 – Arctic fingernail clam
- Sphaerium novaezelandiae Deshayes, 1855
- Sphaerium nucleus (Studer, 1820)
- Sphaerium nyanzae E. A. Smith, 1892

== O ==
- †Sphaerium oborense Popova, 1964
- Sphaerium occidentale (J. Lewis, 1856)
- Sphaerium okinawaense Mori, 1937
- †Sphaerium orientalis J.-S. Yu & K. Zhang, 1984
- Sphaerium ovale (A. Férussac, 1807)
- †Sphaerium ozegovici Brusina, 1897

== P–Q ==
- †Sphaerium parasolidium B.-Y. Huang & X.-Q. Zhang, 1982
- Sphaerium parenzani (Gambetta, 1930)
- Sphaerium partumeium (Say, 1822)
- Sphaerium parvium Yen, 1948
- Sphaerium patagonicum (Pilsbry, 1911)
- Sphaerium patella (A. Gould, 1850)
- †Sphaerium pingquanense J.-S. Yu & K. Zhang, 1984
- †Sphaerium plantarum Saporta, 1889
- †Sphaerium planum Meek & Hayden, 1860
- †Sphaerium praecoquum L. S. Russell, 1937
- †Sphaerium praelacustris (Tolstikova, 1973)
- †Sphaerium praetermissum (Noulet, 1854)
- Sphaerium problematicum Gabriel, 1939
- †Sphaerium progrediens L. S. Russell, 1952
- †Sphaerium prominulum (Reuss, 1849)
- †Sphaerium proscaldianum Martinson & Tolstikova, 1969
- †Sphaerium pujiangense Z.-W. Gu & Q.-H. Ma, 1976
- †Sphaerium pyrum J.-G. Sha, 1992
- †Sphaerium quarterina (V. Anistratenko & Starobogatov, 1990)
- †Sphaerium quasicornum B.-Y. Huang & X.-Q. Zhang, 1982
- Sphaerium quirindi (Korniushin, 2000)

== R ==
- Sphaerium ranae van Benthem Jutting, 1927
- †Sphaerium recticardinale Meek & Hayden, 1860
- †Sphaerium rectiglobosum Z.-W. Gu & J.-S. Yu, 1976
- Sphaerium regulare Mandahl-Barth, 1954
- †Sphaerium reisi (T. D. A. Cockerell, 1924)
- Sphaerium rhomboideum (Say, 1822)
- Sphaerium rivicola (Lamarck, 1818)
- †Sphaerium rogersi Hannibal, 1912
- †Sphaerium rosmalense (T. Meijer, 1990)
- †Sphaerium rotunditrigonum X.-H. Yu, 1982
- †Sphaerium rotundum J.-S. Yu & K. Zhang, 1984
- †Sphaerium rugosum Meek, 1870

== S ==
- Sphaerium securis (Prime, 1852)
- †Sphaerium selenginense (Martinson, 1956)
- †Sphaerium semisolidum Martinson, 1956
- †Sphaerium shantungense (Grabau, 1923)
- †Sphaerium shouchangense Q.-H. Ma, 1980
- Sphaerium simile (Say, 1817)
- †Sphaerium simplex J.-S. Yu, 1984
- Sphaerium solidum (Normand, 1844)
- †Sphaerium squamula L. S. Russell, 1932
- †Sphaerium starobogatovi (V. Anistratenko, 1991)
- †Sphaerium stewartensis Firby, 1966
- †Sphaerium stojanovici Brusina, 1897
- Sphaerium striatinum (Lamarck, 1818)
- †Sphaerium studeri Locard, 1893
- Sphaerium stuhlmanni E. von Martens, 1897
- †Sphaerium subellipticum (Meek & Hayden, 1856)
- †Sphaerium subnobile (Cobălcescu, 1883)
- †Sphaerium subovatum B.-D. Shi, 1982
- †Sphaerium subplanum (Reis, 1910)
- †Sphaerium subtile T. Meijer, 1990
- Sphaerium subtransversum Prime, 1860

== T ==
- †Sphaerium tani (Grabau, 1923)
- Sphaerium tasmanicum (Tenison Woods, 1876)
- Sphaerium tatiarae Cotton & Godfrey, 1938
- †Sphaerium tignense (Martinson, 1961)
- Sphaerium titicacense (Pilsbry, 1924)
- Sphaerium transversum (Say, 1829)
- Sphaerium triangulare (Say, 1829)

== V-Z ==
- Sphaerium victoriae E. A. Smith, 1906
- †Sphaerium wiljuicum (Martinson, 1956)
- †Sphaerium yiyangense B.-L. Ding, 1982
- †Sphaerium yongkangense Q.-H. Ma, 1980
- †Sphaerium zhejiangense Q.-H. Ma, 1980
- †Sphaerium zhujiangense B.-Y. Huang & X.-Q. Zhang, 1982
