= List of non-marine molluscs of Lithuania =

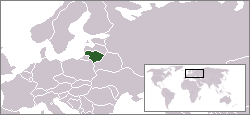
Location of Lithuania

The non-marine molluscs of Lithuania are a part of the molluscan fauna of Lithuania.

== Freshwater gastropods ==
This list is based on Ewa Włosik-Bieńczak's "Molluscs of selected watercourses and reservoirs in Vilnius".

Neritidae

- Theodoxus fluviatilis (Linnaeus, 1758) - river nerite

Viviparidae

- Viviparus contectus (Millet, 1813)
- Viviparus viviparus (Linnaeus, 1758)

Bithyniidae

- Bithynia tentaculata (Linnaeus, 1758) - faucet snail
- Bithynia leachii (Sheppard, 1823)

Hydrobiidae

- Potamopyrgus antipodarum (Gray, 1843)

Amnicolidae

- Marstoniopsis insubrica (A. Schmidt, 1856)

Lithoglyphidae

- Lithoglyphus naticoides (C. Pfeiffer, 1828) - gravel snail

Valvatidae

- Valvata cristata O. F. Müller, 1774
- Valvata macrostoma Studer, 1820
- Valvata piscinalis (O. F. Müller, 1774) - European valve snail
- Borysthenia naticina Menke, 1845

Acroloxidae

- Acroloxus lacustris (Linnaeus, 1758)

Lymnaeidae

- Lymnaea stagnalis (Linnaeus, 1758)
- Stagnicola palustris (O. F. Müller, 1774)
- Stagnicola corvus (Gmelin, 1791)
- Galba truncatula (O. F. Müller, 1774)
- Omphiscola glabra (O. F. Müller, 1774) - pond mud snail
- Radix auricularia (Linnaeus, 1758)
- Peregriana peregra (O. F. Müller, 1774)
- Myxas glutinosa (O. F. Müller, 1774)

Physidae

- Physa fontinalis (Linnaeus, 1758)
- Physella acuta (Draparnaud, 1805)
- Aplexa hypnorum (Linnaeus, 1758)

Planorbidae

- Planorbarius corneus (Linnaeus, 1758) - great ramshorn
- Planorbis planorbis (Linnaeus, 1758)
- Planorbis carinatus O. F. Müller, 1774
- Anisus spirorbis (Linnaeus, 1758)
- Anisus leucostoma (Millet, 1813)
- Anisus septemgyratus (Rossmässler, 1835)
- Anisus vortex (Linnaeus, 1758)
- Anisus vorticulus (Troschel, 1834) - lesser ramshorn snail
- Bathyomphalus contortus (Linnaeus, 1758)
- Gyraulus albus (O. F. Müller, 1774)
- Gyraulus parvus (Alder, 1838)
- Gyraulus riparius (Westerlund, 1865)
- Gyraulus rossmaessleri (Auerswald, 1852)
- Gyraulus gredleri (Gredler, 1859)
- Armiger crista (Linnaeus, 1758) - nautilus ramshorn
- Hippeutis complanatus (Linnaeus, 1758) - flat ram's-horn snail
- Segmentina nitida (O. F. Müller, 1774) - shining ram's-horn snail
- Ancylus fluviatilis O. F. Müller, 1774 - river limpet

== Land gastropods ==
This list is based on Grita Skujiene's "An overview of the data on the terrestrial molluscs in Lithuania".

Aciculidae

- Acicula polita (Hartmann, 1840)

Carychiidae

- Carychium minimum O. F. Müller, 1774
- Carychium tridentatum (Risso, 1826)

Succineidae

- Succinella oblonga Draparnaud, 1801
- Succinea putris (Linnaeus, 1758)
- Oxyloma elegans (Risso, 1826)
- Oxyloma sarsii (Esmark, 1886)

Cochlicopidae

- Cochlicopa lubrica (O. F. Müller, 1774)
- Cochlicopa nitens (Gallenstein, 1848)

Truncatellinidae

- Columella edentula (Draparnaud, 1805)
- Truncatellina cylindrica (Férussac, 1807)

Vertiginidae

- Vertigo pusilla (O. F. Müller, 1774)
- Vertigo antivertigo (Draparnaud, 1801)
- Vertigo substriata (Jeffreys, 1833)
- Vertigo pygmaea (Draparnaud, 1801) - crested vertigo
- Vertigo moulinsiana (Dupuy, 1849) - Desmoulin's whorl snail
- Vertigo modesta (Say, 1824) - cross vertigo
- Vertigo ronnebyensis (Westerlund, 1871)
- Vertigo genesii (Gredler, 1856) - round-mouthed whorl snail
- Vertigo geyeri Lindholm, 1925
- Vertigo alpestris Alder, 1837
- Vertigo angustior Jeffreys, 1830 - narrow-mouthed whorl snail

Pupillidae

- Pupilla muscorum (Linnaeus, 1758) - widespread column

Valloniidae

- Vallonia costata (O. F. Müller, 1774)
- Vallonia pulchella (O. F. Müller, 1774) - lovely vallonia
- Vallonia excentrica Sterki, 1892 - eccentric vallonia
- Acanthinula aculeata (O. F. Müller, 1774)

Enidae

- Ena montana (Draparnaud, 1801)
- Ena obscura (O. F. Müller, 1774)

Punctidae

- Punctum pygmaeum (Draparnaud, 1801)

Discidae

- Discus ruderatus (Férussac, 1821)
- Discus rotundatus (O. F. Müller, 1774) - rotund disc

Arionidae

- Arion ater rufus (Linnaeus, 1758) - red slug
- Arion subfuscus (Draparnaud, 1805)
- Arion hortensis Férussac, 1819 - garden slug
- Arion circumscriptus (Johnston, 1828)
  - Arion circumscriptus silvaticus Lohmander, 1937
- Arion fasciatus (Nilsson, 1822) - orange-banded arion

Vitrinidae

- Vitrina pellucida (O. F. Müller, 1774)

Pristilomatidae

- Vitrea crystallina (O. F. Müller, 1774)
- Vitrea contracta (Westerlund, 1871) - milky crystal snail

Oxychilidae

- Aegopinella pura (Alder, 1830) - clear glass snail
- Aegopinella nitens (Michaud, 1831)
- Aegopinella nitidula (Draparnaud, 1805) - waxy glass snail
- Perpolita hammonis (Ström, 1765)
- Perpolita petronella (L. Pfeiffer, 1853)
- Oxychilus cellarius (O. F. Müller, 1774) - cellar glass-snail

Gastrodontidae

- Zonitoides nitidus (O. F. Müller, 1774) - shiny gloss snail

Limacidae

- Limax maximus Linnaeus, 1758 - leopard slug
- Limax cinereoniger Wolf, 1803 - ash-black slug
- Limacus flavus Linnaeus, 1758 - yellow slug
- Malacolimax tenellus (O. F. Müller, 1774) - lemon slug
- Lehmannia marginata (O. F. Müller, 1774)
- Ambigolimax valentianus (Férussac, 1821)

Agriolimacidae

- Deroceras sturanyi (Simroth, 1894)
- Deroceras laeve (O. F. Müller, 1774) - marsh slug
- Deroceras agreste (Linnaeus, 1758) - grey field slug
- Deroceras reticulatum (O. F. Müller, 1774) - grey garden slug

Euconulidae

- Euconulus fulvus (O. F. Müller, 1774)

Clausiliidae

- Cochlodina laminata (Montagu, 1803)
- Cochlodina orthostoma (Menke, 1830)
- Ruthenica filograna (Rossmässler, 1836)
- Macrogastra ventricosa (Draparnaud, 1801)
- Macrogastra plicatula (Draparnaud, 1801)
- Macrogastra borealis (A. Schmidt, 1857)
- Clausilia bidentata (Ström, 1765) - two-toothed door snail
- Clausilia dubia (Draparnaud, 1805)
- Clausilia cruciata (Studer, 1802)
- Clausilia pumila C. Pfeiffer, 1828
- Laciniaria plicata (Draparnaud, 1801)
- Alinda biplicata (Montagu, 1803) - two-lipped door snail
- Bulgarica cana (Held, 1836)

Camaenidae

- Fruticola fruticum (O. F. Müller, 1774)

Geomitridae

- Helicella obvia (Menke, 1828)

Hygromiidae

- Perforatella bidentata (Gmelin, 1791)
- Perforatella rubiginosa (A. Schmidt, 1853)
- Trochulus hispidus (Linnaeus, 1758) - hairy snail
- Euomphalia strigella (Draparnaud, 1801)

Helicidae

- Arianta arbustorum (Linnaeus, 1758) - copse snail
- Chilostoma faustinum (Rossmässler, 1835)
- Isognomostoma isognomostomos (Schröter, 1784)
- Cepaea nemoralis (Linnaeus, 1758) - lemon snail
- Cepaea hortensis (O. F. Müller, 1774) - white-lipped snail
- Helix pomatia Linnaeus, 1758 - Roman snail

== Freshwater bivalves ==
This list is based on Ewa Włosik-Bieńczak's "Molluscs of selected watercourses and reservoirs in Vilnius".

Margaritiferidae

- Margaritifera margaritifera (Linnaeus, 1758) - freshwater pearl mussel

Unionidae

- Unio pictorum (Linnaeus, 1758) - painter's mussel
- Unio tumidus Philipsson, 1788 - swollen river mussel
- Unio crassus Philipsson, 1788 - thick shelled river mussel
- Anodonta cygnea (Linnaeus, 1758) - swan mussel
- Anodonta anatina (Linnaeus, 1758) - duck mussel
- Pseudanodonta complanata (Rossmässler, 1835) - depressed river mussel

Sphaeriidae

- Sphaerium corneum (Linnaeus, 1758) - horny orb mussel
- Sphaerium lacustre (O. F. Müller, 1774) - lake fingernail clam
- Sphaerium rivicola (Lamarck, 1818) - river orb mussel
- Sphaerium solidum (Normand, 1844) - solid orb mussel
- Pisidium amnicum (O. F. Müller, 1774) - greater European peaclam
- Euglesa casertana (Poli, 1791) - pea cockle
- Euglesa henslowana (Sheppard, 1823) - Henslow peaclam
- Euglesa lilljeborgii (Clessin, 1886)
- Euglesa nitida Jenyns, 1832 - shining pea clam
- Euglesa subtruncata Malm, 1855
- Euglesa supina A. Schmidt, 1851
- Pisidium milium Held, 1836
- Pisidium pseudosphaerium Favre, 1927
- Pisidium pulchellum (Jenyns, 1832) - iridescent pea mussel
- Pisidium hibernicum Westerlund, 1894
- Pisidium obtusale (Lamarck, 1818)
- Pisidium personatum Malm, 1855
- Conventus conventus (Clessin, 1877) - arctic-alpine pea clam
- Odhneripisidium moitessierianum Paladilhe, 1866
- Odhneripisidium tenuilineatum Stelfox, 1918 - fine-lipped pea mussel

Dreissenidae

- Dreissena polymorpha (Pallas, 1771) - zebra mussel

== See also ==
- List of non-marine molluscs of Latvia
- List of non-marine molluscs of Poland
- List of non-marine molluscs of Russia
