= List of non-marine molluscs of Russia =

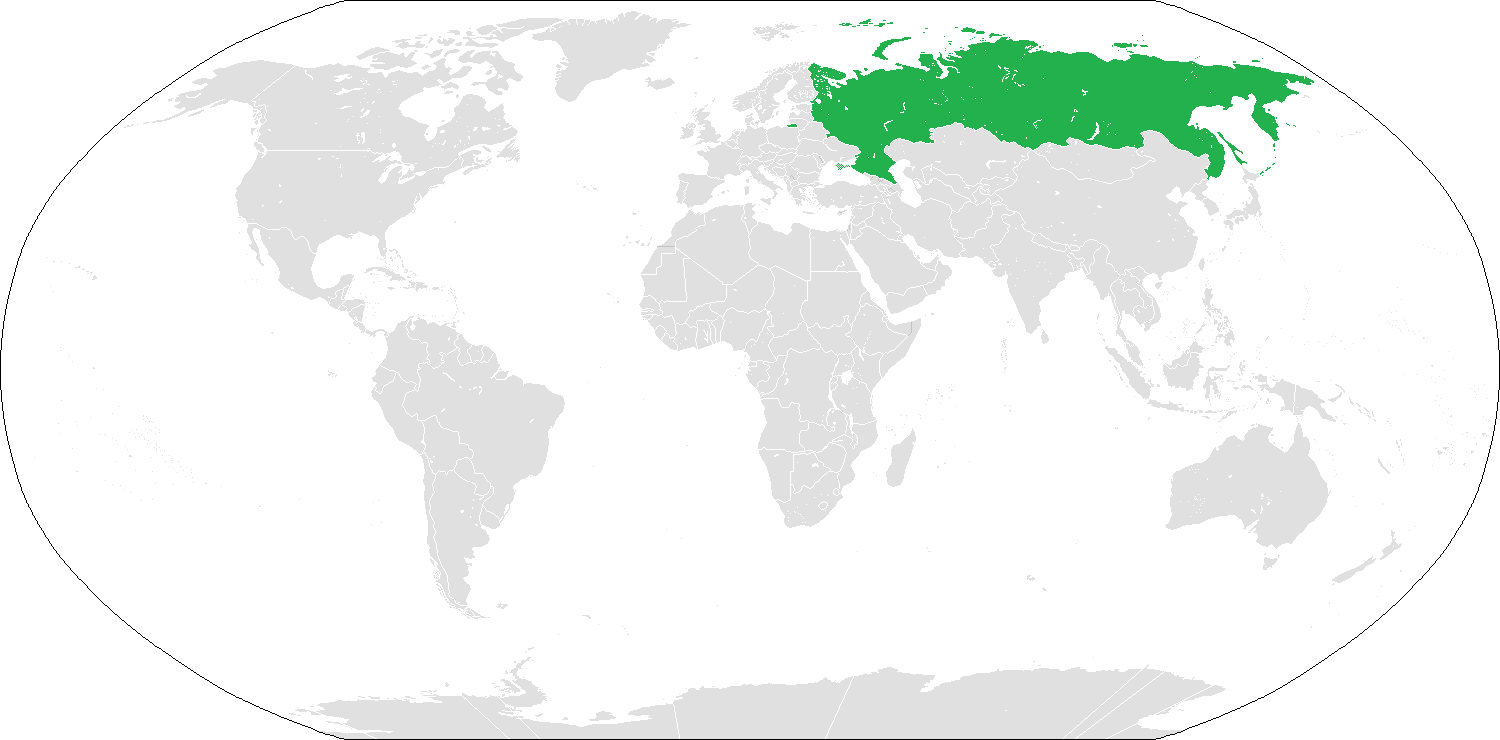
Location of Russia

The non-marine molluscs of Russia are a part of the molluscan fauna of Russia. A number of species of non-marine molluscs are found in the wild in Russia.

== Freshwater gastropods ==
Valvatidae

- Cincinna (Sibirovalvata) aliena (Westerlund, 1877)
- Cincinna (Sibirovalvata) confusa (Westerlund, 1897)
- Cincinna (Sibirovalvata) sibirica (Middendorff, 1851)

Lymnaeidae

- Ampullaceana balthica (Linnaeus, 1758)
- Galba (Galba) truncatula (O. F. Müller, 1774)
- Lymnaea (Lymnaea) stagnalis (Linnaeus, 1758)
- Radix (Peregriana) dolgini (Gundrizer et Starobogatov, 1979)
- Radix (Peregriana) intermedia (Lamarck, 1822)
- Radix (Peregriana) peregra (O. F. Müller, 1774)
- Stagnicola (Stagnicola) ventricosella (B. Dybowski, 1913)

Physidae

- Aplexa hypnorum (Linnaeus, 1758)

Planorbidae

- Bathyomphalus contortus (Linnaeus, 1758)
- Gyraulus (Gyraulus) borealis (Lovén in Westerlund, 1875)
- Gyraulus (Gyraulus) stelmachoetius (Westerlund, 1881)
- Gyraulus (Gyraulus) stroemi (Westerlund, 1881)
- Hippeutis fontana (Lightfoot, 1786)

== Land gastropods ==
Succineidae

- Succinea putris (Linnaeus, 1774)
- Succinella oblonga (Draparnaud, 1801)

Cochlicopidae

- Cochlicopa lubrica (O. F. Müller, 1774)

Vertiginidae

- Vertigo lilljeborgi Westerlund, 1868

Enidae

- Brephulopsis cylindrica (Menke, 1828)

Helicodiscidae

- Lucilla parallelus (Say, 1821)
- Lucilla scintilla (R. T. Lowe, 1852)
- Lucilla singleyana (Pilsbry, 1889)

Gastrodontidae

- Zonitoides arboreus (Say, 1916)

Oxychilidae

- Oxychilus alliarius (Miller, 1822)
- Oxychilus cellarius (O. F. Müller, 1774)
- Oxychilus draparnaudi (Beck, 1837)
- Oxychilus translucidus (Mortillet, 1854)

Pristilomatidae

- Vitrea diaphana (Studer, 1820)

Limacidae

- Ambigolimax valentianus (Férussac, 1823)
- Bielzia coerulans (M. Bielz, 1851)
- Limacus flavus Linnaeus, 1758
- Limax maximus Linnaeus, 1758

Agriolimacidae

- Deroceras caucasicum (Simroth, 1901)
- Deroceras laeve (O. F. Müller, 1774)
- Deroceras pollonerae (Simroth, 1889)
- Deroceras praecox Wiktor, 1966
- Deroceras reticulatum (O. F. Müller, 1774)
- Deroceras sturanyi (Simroth, 1894)
- Krynickillus melanocephalus Kaleniczenko, 1851

Boettgerillidae

- Boettgerilla pallens Simroth, 1912

Arionidae

- Arion ater rufus (Linnaeus, 1758)
- Arion circumscriptus silvaticus Lohmander, 1937
- Arion distinctus Mabille, 1868
- Arion fasciatus (Nilsson, 1822)
- Arion lusitanicus Mabille, 1868

Camaenidae

- Fruticicola fruticum (O. F. Müller, 1774)

Geomitridae

- Helicella candicans (L. Pfeiffer, 1841)
- Helicella obvia (Menke, 1828)

Hygromiidae

- Euomphalia strigella (Draparnaud, 1801)
- Pseudotrichia rubiginosa (A. Schmidt, 1853)
- Stenomphalia pisiformis (L. Pfeiffer, 1946)
- Stenomphalia ravergiensis (Férussac, 1835)
- Trochulus hispidus (Linnaeus, 1758)
- Xeropicta derbentina (Krynicki, 1836)

Helicidae

- Arianta arbustorum (Linnaeus, 1758) - copse snail
- Caucasotachea vindobonensis (C. Pfeiffer, 1828)
- Cepaea hortensis (O.F. Müller, 1774) - white-lipped snail
- Cepaea nemoralis (Linnaeus, 1758) - brown-lipped snail
- Cornu aspersum (O. F. Müller, 1774) - garden snail
- Helix lucorum Linnaeus, 1758 - Turkish snail
- Helix lutescens Rossmässler, 1837
- Helix pomatia Linnaeus, 1758 - Roman snail

== Freshwater bivalves ==
Unionidae

- Colletopterum anatinum (Linnaeus, 1758)

Sphaeriidae

- Amesoda galitzini (Clessin, 1875)
- Cingulipisidium feroense Korniushin, 1991
- Cingulipisidium pulchricingulatum (Starobogatov et Budnikova, 1985 [1986])
- Cyclocalyx cyclocalyx (Starobogatov et Budnikova, 1985 [1986])
- Cyclocalyx gibbus (Prozorova, 1988)
- Cyclocalyx obtusalis (Lamarck, 1818)
- Euglesa (Pseudeupera) altaica (Krivosheina, 1979)
- Euglesa (Euglesa) buchtarmensis Krivosheina, 1978
- Euglesa (Euglesa) casertana (Poli, 1791)
- Euglesa (Cyclocalyx) cor (Starobogatov et Streletzkaja, 1967)
- Euglesa (Cingulipisidium) crassa (Stelfox, 1918)
- Euglesa (Cingulipisidium) depressinitida Anistratenko et Starobogatov, 1990[1991]
- Euglesa (Cingulipisidium) fedderseni (Westerlund, 1890)
- Euglesa (Pseudeupera) humiliumbo Krivosheina, 1978
- Euglesa (Cyclocalyx) johanseni Dolgin et Korniushin, 1994
- Euglesa (Cyclocalyx) magnifica (Clessin in Westerlund, 1873)
- Euglesa (Pseudeupera) mucronata (Clessin in Westerlund, 1877)
- Euglesa (Euglesa) obliquata (Clessin in Martens, 1874)
- Euglesa (Pseudosphaerium) pseudosphaerium (Favre, 1927)
- Euglesa (Pulchelleuglesa) pulchella (Jenyns, 1832)
- Euglesa (Cyclocalyx) scholtzii (Clessin, 1873)
- Euglesa (Henslowiana) sibirica (Clessin in Westerlund, 1877)
- Euglesa (Pseudeupera) subtruncata (Malm, 1855)
- Henslowiana baudonii (Clessin, 1873)
- Henslowiana henslowana (Leach in Sheppard, 1823)
- Henslowiana ostroumovi (Pirogov et Starobogatov, 1974)
- Henslowiana polonica (Anistratenko et Starobogatov, 1990 [1991])
- Henslowiana suecica (Clessin in Westerlund, 1873)
- Henslowiana supina (A. Schmidt, 1850)
- Henslowiana tenuicostulata (Krivosheina, 1978)
- Lacustrina dilatata (Westerlund, 1897)
- Musculium compressum (Middendorff, 1851)
- Musculium (Musculium) creplini (Dunker, 1845)
- Musculium hungaricum (Hazay, 1881)
- Musculium (Paramusculium) inflatum (Middendorff, 1851)
- Neopisidium moitessierianum (Paladilhe, 1866)
- Nucleocyclas radiata (Westerlund, 1897)
- Parasphaerium nitida (Clessin in Westerlund, 1876)
- Pisidium amnicum (Müller, 1774)
- Pisidium (Pisidium) decurtatum Lindholm, 1909
- Pisidium (Pisidium) inflatum Megerle von Mühlfeld in Porro, 1838
- Pseudeupera pirogovi (Starobogatov in Stadnichenko, 1984)
- Pseudeupera starobogatovi (Krivosheina, 1978)
- Pseudeupera tenuicardo (Krivosheina, 1978)
- Roseana globularis (Clessin in Westerlund, 1873)
- Roseana rosea (Scholtz, 1843)
- Sphaerium (Cyrenastrum) asiaticum (Martens, 1864)
- Sphaerium (Cyrenastrum) caperatum Westerlund, 1897
- Sphaerium corneum (Linnaeus, 1758)
- Sphaerium (Nucleocyclas) falsinucleus (Novikov in Starobogatov et Korniushin, 1986 [1987])
- Sphaerium (Sphaerium) levinodis Westerlund, 1876
- Sphaerium (Sphaerium) mamillanum Westerlund, 1871
- Sphaerium (Nucleocyclas) ovale (Férussac, 1807)
- Sphaerium (Parasphaerium) rectidens Starobogatov et Streletzkaja, 1967
- Sphaerium (Sphaerium) scaldianum (Normand, 1844)
- Sphaerium (Sphaerium) westerlundi Clessin in Westerlund, 1873

== See also ==
- List of marine molluscs of Russia

Lists of molluscs of surrounding countries:

- List of non-marine molluscs of Norway
- List of non-marine molluscs of Finland
- List of non-marine molluscs of Poland
- List of non-marine molluscs of Estonia
- List of non-marine molluscs of Latvia
- List of non-marine molluscs of Lithuania
- List of non-marine molluscs of Belarus
- List of non-marine molluscs of Ukraine
- List of non-marine molluscs of Georgia
- List of non-marine molluscs of Azerbaijan
- List of non-marine molluscs of Kazakhstan
- List of non-marine molluscs of Mongolia
- List of non-marine molluscs of China
- List of non-marine molluscs of North Korea
