= List of non-marine molluscs of Poland =

Location of Poland

There are approximately 265 species of non-marine molluscs living in the wild in Poland.

== Systematic list ==
The list is in zoological order rather than alphabetical order. The Polish common name (where one exists) of each mollusc is given first, in parentheses, and then the scientific name.

The source for the non-marine species on this list is: CLECOM-PROJECT: Checklist of species-group taxa of continental Mollusca living in the Netherlands (CLECOM Section I) 14-07-2002 with changes.

=== Gastropoda ===
Neritidae

- (rozdepka rzeczna) Theodoxus fluviatilis fluviatilis (Linnaeus, 1758)
  - Theodoxus fluviatilis littoralis (Linnaeus, 1758)

Aciculidae

- (igliczek karpacki) Acicula parcelineata (Clessin, 1911)
- (igliczek lśniący) Platyla polita (Hartmann, 1840)

Viviparidae

- (żyworódka pospolita) Viviparus viviparus (Linnaeus, 1758)
- (żyworódka rzeczna) Viviparus contectus (Millet, 1813)

Bithyniidae

- (zagrzebka pospolita) Bithynia tentaculata (Linnaeus, 1758)
- (zagrzebka sklepiona) Bithynia leachii (Sheppard, 1823)
- Bithynia transsilvanica (E. A. Bielz, 1853)

Hydrobiidae

- (wodożytka nowozelandzka) Potamopyrgus antipodarum (Gray, 1843) - non-indigenous
- (wodożytka bałtycka) Hydrobia ventrosa (Montagu, 1803)
- (wodożytka przybrzeżna) Peringia ulvae (Pennant, 1777)
- Obrovia neglecta (Muus, 1963)
- (niepozorka ojcowska) Falniowskia neglectissima (Falniowski & Steffek, 1989)
- (namułek pospolity) Lithoglyphus naticoides (C. Pfeiffer, 1828)

Amnicolidae

- (sadzawczak drobny) Marstoniopsis scholtzi (A. Schmidt, 1856)
- (źródlarka karpacka) Bythinella austriaca austriaca (Frauenfeld, 1857)
  - Bythinella austriaca ehrmanni Pax, 1938
- Bythinella hungarica Hazay, 1880
- Bythinella zyvionteki Falniowski, 1987
- Bythinella metarubra Falniowski, 1987
- Bythinella micherdzinskii Falniowski, 1980

Valvatidae

- (zawójka płaska) Valvata cristata O. F. Müller, 1774
- (zawójka pospolita) Valvata piscinalis O. F. Müller, 1774
- (zawójka przypłaszczona) Valvata macrostoma Mörch, 1864
- (zawójka rzeczna) Borysthenia naticina (Menke, 1845)

Acroloxidae

- (przyczepka jeziorna) Acroloxus lacustris (Linnaeus, 1758)

Lymnaeidae

- (błotniarka moczarowa) Galba truncatula (O. F. Müller, 1774)
- (błotniarka pospolita) Stagnicola palustris (O. F. Müller, 1774)
- Stagnicola turricula (Held, 1836)
- Stagnicola occultus (Jackiewicz, 1959)
- Stagnicola corvus (Gmelin, 1791)
- (błotniarka uszata) Radix auricularia (Linnaeus, 1758)
- (błotniarka jajowata) Radix peregra auct. (= Radix labiata (Rossmässler, 1835) & Radix balthica (Linnaeus, 1758))
- Radix ampla (W. Hartmann, 1821)
- (błotniarka otułka) Myxas glutinosa (O. F. Müller, 1774)
- (błotniarka stawowa) Lymnaea stagnalis (Linnaeus, 1758)

Physidae

- (rozdętka pospolita) Physa fontinalis (Linnaeus, 1758)
- (rozdętka zaostrzona) Physella acuta (Draparnaud, 1805) - synonym Physella heterostropha (Say, 1817) - non-indigenous
- (zawijka pospolita) Aplexa hypnorum (Linnaeus, 1758)

Planorbidae

- (zatoczek rogowy) Planorbarius corneus (Linnaeus, 1758)
- Planorbella duryi (Wetherby, 1879)
- Menetus dilatatus (Gould, 1841) - non-indigenous
- Ferrissia fragilis (Tryon, 1863) - syn. Ferrissia clessiniana (Jickeli, 1882) - non-indigenous
- (zatoczek obrzeżony) Planorbis carinatus O. F. Müller, 1774
- (zatoczek pospolity) Planorbis planorbis (Linnaeus, 1758)
- (zatoczek moczarowy) Anisus spirorbis (Linnaeus, 1758)
- Anisus septemgyratus (Rossmässler, 1835)
- (zatoczek wieloskrętny) Anisus calculiformis (Sandberger, 1874)
- (zatoczek ostrokrawędzisty) Anisus vortex (Linnaeus, 1758)
- (zatoczek łamliwy) Anisus vorticulus (Troschel, 1834)
- (zatoczek skręcony) Bathyomphalus contortus (Linnaeus, 1758)
- (zatoczek białawy) Gyraulus albus (O. F. Müller, 1774)
- Gyraulus acronicus (A. Férussac, 1807)
- (zatoczek gładki) Gyraulus laevis (Alder, 1838)
- (zatoczek przybrzeżny) Gyraulus riparius (Westerlund, 1865)
- (zatoczek Rossmaesslera) Gyraulus rossmaessleri (Auerswald, 1852)
- (zatoczek malutki) Gyraulus crista (Linnaeus, 1758)
- (zatoczek spłaszczony) Hippeutis complanatus (Linnaeus, 1758)
- (zatoczek lśniący) Segmentina nitida (O. F. Müller, 1774)
- (przytulik strumieniowy) Ancylus fluviatilis O. F. Müller, 1774

Ellobiidae

- Carychium minimum O. F. Müller, 1774
- Carychium tridentatum (Risso, 1826)

Succineidae

- (bursztynka pospolita) Succinea putris (Linnaeus, 1758)
- (bursztynka podłużna) Succinella oblonga (Draparnaud, 1801)
- (bursztynka wysmukła) Oxyloma elegans (Risso, 1826)
- Oxyloma dunkeri (L. Pfeiffer, 1865)
- Oxyloma sarsii (Esmark, 1886)

Cochlicopidae

- (błyszczotka połyskliwa) Cochlicopa lubrica (O. F. Müller, 1774) - Cochlicopa repentina Hudec, 1960 is a form of Cochlicopa lubrica.
- (błyszczotka mała) Cochlicopa lubricella (Rossmässler, 1835)
- Cochlicopa nitens (M. von Gallenstein, 1848)

Orculidae

- Orcula dolium dolium (Draparnaud, 1801)
- Sphyradium doliolum (Bruguière, 1792)
- Pagodulina pagodula
  - Pagodulina pagodula altilis Klemm, 1939

Argnidae

- Argna bielzi bielzi (Rossmässler, 1859)

Valloniidae

- (ślimaczek żeberkowany) Vallonia costata (O. F. Müller, 1774)
- (ślimaczek gładki) Vallonia pulchella (O. F. Müller, 1774)
- Vallonia excentrica Sterki, 1893
- Vallonia enniensis (Gredler, 1856)
- Vallonia declivis Sterki1893
- (jeżynka kolczasta) Acanthinula aculeata (O. F. Müller, 1774)
- Spermodea lamellata Jeffreys, 1830

Pupillidae

- (poczwarówka pospolita) Pupilla muscorum (Linnaeus, 1758)
- Pupilla pratensis (Clessin, 1871)
- Pupilla triplicata (S. Studer, 1820)
- Pupilla sterrii (Voith, 1840)

Pyramidulidae

- Pyramidula pusilla (Vallot, 1801)

Chondrinidae

- Granaria frumentum (Draparnaud, 1801)
- (poczwarówka zaostrzona) Chondrina arcadica clienta (Westerlund, 1883)

Vertiginidae

- (poczwarówka bezzębna) Columella edentula (Draparnaud, 1805)
- Columella aspera Walden, 1966
- Columella columella (Martens, 1830)
- Truncatellina costulata (Nilsson, 1822)
- Truncatellina claustralis (Gredler, 1856)
- Truncatellina cylindrica (Férussac, 1807)
- (poczwarówka drobna) Vertigo pusilla O. F. Müller, 1774
- Vertigo antivertigo (Draparnaud, 1801)
- (poczwarówka prążkowana) Vertigo substriata (Jeffreys, 1833)
- (poczwarówka karliczka) Vertigo pygmaea (Draparnaud, 1801)
- Vertigo moulinsiana (Dupuy, 1849)
- Vertigo modesta arctica (Wallenberg, 1858)
- Vertigo ronnebyensis (Westerlund, 1871)
- Vertigo genesii (Gredler, 1856)
- Vertigo geyeri Lindholm, 1925
- Vertigo alpestris Alder, 1837
- (poczwarówka zwężona) Vertigo angustior Jeffreys, 1830

Enidae

- Ena montana (Draparnaud, 1801)
- Merdigera obscura (O. F. Müller, 1774)
- (wałówka trójzębna) Chondrula tridens (O. F. Müller, 1774)

Clausiliidae

- (świdrzyk lśniący) Cochlodina laminata laminata (Montagu, 1803)
- Cochlodina dubiosa corcontica Brabenec, 1967
- Cochlodina costata silesiaca(A. Schmidt, 1868)
- Cochlodina orthostoma orthostoma (Menke, 1828)
- Charpentieria ornata (Rossmässler, 1836)
- Ruthenica filograna filograna (Rossmässler, 1836)
- (świdrzyk okazały) Macrogastra ventricosa (Draparnaud, 1801)
- (świdrzyk rozdęty) Macrogastra tumida (Rossmässler, 1836)
- Macrogastra borealis borealis (O. Boettger, 1878)
- Macrogastra badia crispulata (Westerlund, 1884)
- (świdrzyk leśny) Macrogastra plicatula plicatula (Draparnaud, 1801)
  - Macrogastra plicatula inuncta (L. Pfeiffer, 1849)
  - Macrogastra plicatula cruda (Rossmässler, 1835)
  - Macrogastra plicatula nana (Scholtz, 1843)
- Clausilia rugosa parvula (A. Férussac, 1807)
- Clausilia bidentata bidentata (Ström, 1765)
- Clausilia cruciata cruciata (S. Studer, 1820)
- Clausilia pumila pumila C. Pfeiffer, 1828
- Clausilia dubia dubia Draparnaud, 1805
- (świdrzyk fałdzisty) Laciniaria plicata (Draparnaud, 1801)
- Balea perversa (Linnaeus, 1758)
- (świdrzyk dwufałdkowy) Balea biplicata biplicata (Montagu, 1803)
- Balea fallax (Rossmässler, 1836)
- Balea stabilis (L. Pfeiffer, 1847)
- Vestia elata (Rossmässler, 1836)
- Vestia gulo (E. A. Bielz, 1859)
- Vestia turgida (Rossmässler, 1836)
- (świdrzyk siwy) Bulgarica cana cana (Held, 1836)

Ferussaciidae

- Cecilioides acicula (O. F. Müller, 1774)

Punctidae

- (krążałek malutki) Punctum pygmaeum (Draparnaud, 1801)

Helicodiscidae

- Lucilla singleyana (Pilsbry, 1889)

Discidae

- (krążałek obły) Discus ruderatus (W. Hartmann, 1821)
- (krążałek plamisty) Discus rotundatus (O. F. Müller, 1774)
- Discus perspectivus (Megerle von Mühlfeld, 1816)

Pristilomatidae

- Vitrea diaphana diaphana (S. Studer, 1820)
- Vitrea transsylvanica (Clessin, 1877)
- Vitrea subrimata (Reinhardt, 1871)
- Vitrea crystallina (O. F. Müller, 1774)
- Vitrea contracta (Westerlund, 1871)

Euconulidae

- (stożeczek drobny) Euconulus fulvus (O. F. Müller, 1774)
- Euconulus praticola (Reinhardt, 1883)

Gastrodontidae

- (szklarka obłystek) Zonitoides nitidus (O. F. Müller, 1774)

Oxychilidae

- Daudebardia rufa rufa (Draparnaud, 1805)
- Daudebardia brevipes brevipes (Draparnaud, 1805)
- Carpathica calophana (Westerlund, 1881)
- (szklarka błyszcząca) Oxychilus cellarius (O. F. Müller, 1774)
- Oxychilus draparnaudi draparnaudi (H. Beck, 1837)
- (szklarka czosnkowa) Oxychilus alliarius (Miller, 1822)
- Oxychilus translucidus (Mortillet, 1853)
- Cellariopsis deubeli (A.J. Wagner, 1914)
- Morlina glabra striaria (Westerlund, 1881)
- Mediterranea inopinata (Uličný, 1887)
- Mediterranea depressa (Sterki, 1880)
- Aegopinella pura (Alder, 1830)
- Aegopinella minor (Stabile, 1864)
- Aegopinella nitens (Michaud, 1831)
- Aegopinella nitidula (Draparnaud, 1805)
- Aegopinella epipedostoma iuncta Hudec, 1964
- (szklarka żeberkowana) Perpolita hammonis (Ström, 1765)
- Perpolita petronella (L. Pfeiffer, 1853)

Milacidae

- Tandonia rustica (Millet, 1843)
- Tandonia budapestensis (Hazay, 1880)

Vitrinidae

- Semilimax semilimax (J. Férussac, 1802)
- Semilimax kotulae (Westerlund, 1883)
- Eucobresia diaphana (Draparnaud, 1805)
- Eucobresia nivalis (Dumont & Mortillet, 1854)
- (przeźrotka szklista) Vitrina pellucida (O. F. Müller, 1774)

Boettgerillidae

- Boettgerilla pallens Simroth, 1912

Limacidae

- Limax maximus Linnaeus, 1758
- Limax cinereoniger Wolf, 1803
- Limax bielzii Seibert, 1874
- Limacus flavus (Linnaeus, 1758)
- Malacolimax tenellus (O. F. Müller, 1774)
- Lehmannia marginata (O. F. Müller, 1774)
- Lehmannia macroflagellata Grossu & Lupu, 1962
- Lehmannia valentiana (A. Férussac, 1822)
- Lehmannia carpatica (Bourguignat, 1861)
- (pomrów błękitny) Bielzia coerulans (M. Bielz, 1851)

Agriolimacidae

- Deroceras agreste (Linnaeus, 1758)
- Deroceras laeve (O. F. Müller, 1774)
- Deroceras moldavicum (Grossu & Lupu, 1961)
- Deroceras praecox Wiktor, 1966
- Deroceras reticulatum (O. F. Müller, 1774)
- Deroceras rodnae Grossu & Lupu, 1965
- Deroceras sturanyi (Simroth, 1894)
- Deroceras turcicum (Simroth, 1894)

Arionidae

- (ślinik wielki) Arion rufus (Linnaeus, 1758)
- Arion lusitanicus J. Mabille, 1868
- Arion fuscus (O. F. Müller, 1774)
- Arion circumscriptus Johnston, 1828
- Arion fasciatus (Nilsson, 1823)
- Arion silvaticus Lohmander, 1937
- Arion distinctus J. Mabille, 1868
- Arion intermedius Normand, 1852

Bradybaenidae

- (zaroślarka pospolita) Fruticicola fruticum (O. F. Müller, 1774)

Helicodontidae

- (ślimak obrzeżony) Helicodonta obvoluta (O. F. Müller, 1774)

Hygromiidae

- (ślimak pagórkowy) Euomphalia strigella (Draparnaud, 1801)
- Monacha cartusiana (O. F. Müller, 1774)
- (ślimak kosmaty) Trichia hispida (Linnaeus, 1758)
- Trichia sericea (Draparnaud, 1801)
- Trichia villosula (Rossmässler, 1838)
- Trichia lubomirskii (Ślósarskii, 1881)
- Petasina unidentata unidentata (Draparnaud, 1805)
- Petasina bakowskii (Polinski, 1924)
- Petasina bielzi bielzi (E. A. Bielz, 1859)
  - Petasina bielzi euconus (Westerlund, 1890)
- Helicopsis striata striata (O. F. Müller, 1774)
- Helicella itala itala (Linnaeus, 1758)
- Candidula unifasciata unifasciata (Poiret, 1801)
- Cernuella neglecta (Draparnaud, 1805)
- (ślimak łąkowy) Pseudotrichia rubiginosa (Rossmässler, 1838)
- Monachoides incarnatus incarnatus (O. F. Müller, 1774)
- (ślimak karpacki) Monachoides vicinus (Rossmässler, 1842)
- (ślimak dwuzębny) Perforatella bidentata (Gmelin, 1791)
- Perforatella dibothrion (M. von Kimakowicz, 1884)
- Urticicola umbrosus (C. Pfeiffer, 1828)
- (ślimak przydrożny) Xerolenta obvia obvia (Menke, 1828)

Helicidae

- (ślimak zaroślowy) Arianta arbustorum arbustorum (Linnaeus, 1758)
- (ślimak ostrokrawędzisty) Helicigona lapicida lapicida (Linnaeus, 1758)
- Faustina faustina faustina (Rossmässler, 1835)
- Faustina rossmaessleri (L. Pfeiffer, 1842)
- Faustina cingulella (Rossmässler, 1837)
- (ślimak maskowiec) Isognomostoma isognomostomos (Schröter, 1784)
- Causa holosericea (S. Studer, 1820)
- (wstężyk ogrodowy) Cepaea hortensis (O. F. Müller, 1774)
- (wstężyk gajowy) Cepaea nemoralis (Linnaeus, 1758)
- (wstężyk austriacki) Cepaea vindobonensis (C. Pfeiffer, 1828)
- Cornu aspersum aspersum (O. F. Müller, 1774)
- (ślimak żółtawy) Helix lutescens (Rossmässler, 1837)
- (ślimak winniczek) Helix pomatia Linnaeus, 1758

=== Bivalvia ===
Margaritiferidae

- (perłoródka rzeczna) Margaritifera margaritifera margaritifera (Linnaeus, 1758) - extinct

Unionidae

- (skójka malarska) Unio pictorum pictorum (Linnaeus, 1758)
- (skójka zaostrzona) Unio tumidus tumidus Philipsson, 1788
- (skójka gruboskorupowa) Unio crassus crassus Philipsson, 1788
- (szczeżuja pospolita) Anodonta anatina radiata (O. F. Müller, 1774)
- (szczeżuja wielka) Anodonta cygnea cygnea (Linnaeus, 1758)
- (szczeżuja spłaszczona) Pseudanodonta complanata klettii (Rossmässler, 1835)
- Sinanodonta woodiana (Lea, 1834) - non-indigenous

Sphaeriidae

- (gałeczka rogowa) Sphaerium corneum (Linnaeus, 1758)
- Sphaerium nucleus (S. Studer, 1820)
- Sphaerium ovale (A. Férussac, 1807)
- (gałeczka rzeczna) Sphaerium rivicola (Lamarck, 1818)
- Sphaerium solidum (Normand, 1844)
- (kruszynka delikatna) Musculium lacustre (O. F. Müller, 1774)
- (groszkówka rzeczna) Pisidium amnicum (O. F. Müller, 1774)
- (groszkówka pospolita) Pisidium casertanum (Poli, 1791)
- Pisidium personatum Malm, 1855
- Pisidium obtusale (Lamarck, 1818)
- (groszkówka jajowata) Pisidium henslowanum (Sheppard, 1823)
- Pisidium supinum A. Schmidt, 1851
- Pisidium lilljeborgii Clessin, 1886
- Pisidium hibernicum Westerlund, 1894
- (groszkówka lśniąca) Pisidium nitidum Jenyns, 1832
- Pisidium pseudosphaerium J. Favre, 1927
- Pisidium milium Held, 1836
- Pisidium subtruncatum Malm, 1855
- Pisidium pulchellum Jenyns, 1832
- Pisidium conventus Clessin, 1877
- Pisidium moitessierianum Paladilhe, 1866

Dreissenidae

- (racicznica zmienna) Dreissena polymorpha polymorpha (Pallas, 1771)

== See also ==
Lists of molluscs of surrounding countries:

- List of non-marine molluscs of Germany
- List of non-marine molluscs of the Czech Republic
- List of non-marine molluscs of Slovakia
- List of non-marine molluscs of Ukraine
- List of non-marine molluscs of Belarus
- List of non-marine molluscs of Lithuania
- List of non-marine molluscs of Kaliningrad Oblast
