= List of non-marine molluscs of Hungary =

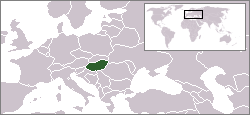
Location of Hungary

The non-marine molluscs of Hungary are a part of the molluscan fauna of Hungary (wildlife of Hungary). A number of species of non-marine molluscs are found in the wild in Hungary.

== Freshwater gastropods ==
Neritidae

- Theodoxus danubialis (C. Pfeiffer, 1828)
- Theodoxus fluviatilis (Linnaeus, 1758)
- Theodoxus prevostianus (Pfeiffer, 1828)

Viviparidae

- Viviparus acerosus (Bourguignat, 1862)
- Viviparus contectus (Millet, 1813)

Thiaridae

- Esperiana daudebartii (Prevost, 1821)
- Esperiana esperi (Férussac, 1823)
- Melanoides tuberculatus (O. F. Müller, 1774)

Hydrobiidae

- Potamopyrgus antipodarum (Gray, 1843)

Lithoglyphidae

- Lithoglyphus naticoides (C. Pfeiffer, 1828)

Bithyniidae

- Bithynia tentaculata (Linnaeus, 1758)

Acroloxidae

- Acroloxus lacustris (Rossmässler, 1838)

Valvatidae

- Borysthenia naticina (Menke, 1845)
- Valvata cristata O. F. Müller, 1774
- Valvata piscinalis (O. F. Müller, 1774)

Lymnaeidae

- Galba truncatula (O. F. Müller, 1774)
- Lymnaea stagnalis (Linnaeus, 1758)
- Radix auricularia (Linnaeus, 1758)
- Radix balthica (Linnaeus, 1758)
- Radix labiata (Rossmässler, 1835)

Physidae

- Haitia acuta (Draparnaud, 1805)
- Physa fontinalis (Linnaeus, 1758)

Planorbidae

- Ancylus fluviatilis O.F. Müller, 1774
- Anisus spirorbis (Linnaeus, 1758)
- Anisus vortex (Linnaeus, 1758)
- Anisus vorticulus (Troschel, 1834)
- Bathyomphalus contortus (Linnaeus, 1758)
- Ferrissia wautieri (Mirolli, 1960)
- Gyraulus albus (O. F. Müller, 1774)
- Gyraulus crista (Linnaeus, 1758)
- Hippeutis complanatus (Linnaeus, 1758)
- Planorbarius corneus (Linnaeus, 1758)
- Segmentina nitida (O.F. Müller, 1774)

== Land gastropods ==
Pomatiidae

- Pomatias elegans (O.F. Müller, 1774)
- Pomatias rivularis (Eichwald, 1829)

Aciculidae

- Platyla banatica (Roßmäßler, 1842)

Zonitidae

- Aegopinella nitens (Michaud, 1831)

Clausiliidae

- Balea stabilis (Pfeiffer, 1847)
- Cochlodina fimbriata (Rossmässler, 1835)
- Macrogastra borealis (Boettger, 1878)
- Macrogastra densestriata (Rossmässler, 1836)
- Pseudofusulus varians (C. Pfeiffer, 1828)

Discidae

- Discus ruderatus (Férussac, 1821)

Vitrinidae

- Oligolimax annularis (Studer, 1820)

Valloniidae

- Vallonia enniensis (Gredler, 1856)

Vertiginidae

- Vertigo angustior Jeffreys, 1830
- Vertigo moulinsiana (Dupuy, 1849)
- Vertigo substriata (Jeffreys, 1833)

Oxychilidae

- Daudebardia brevipes (Draparnaud, 1805)
- Oxychilus draparnaudi (Beck, 1837)
- Oxychilus hydatinus (Rossmässler, 1838)

Agriolimacidae

- Krynickillus melanocephalus Kaleniczenko, 1851

Milacidae

- Tandonia kusceri (H. Wagner, 1931)

Arionidae

- Arion vulgaris Moquin-Tandon, 1855

Hygromiidae

- Xerocampylaea erjaveci (Brusina, 1870)
- Kovacsia kovacsi (Varga & L. Pintér, 1972)

Helicidae

- Chilostoma cingulatum (S. Studer, 1820)
- Drobacia banatica (Rossmässler, 1838)
- Faustina faustina (Rossmässler, 1835)
- Faustina illyrica (Stabille, 1884)
- Helix pomatia (Linnaeus, 1758)

== Freshwater bivalves ==
Corbiculidae

- Corbicula fluminalis (O. F. Müller, 1774)
- Corbicula fluminea (O. F. Müller, 1774)

Dreissenidae

- Dreissena polymorpha (Pallas, 1771)
- Dreissena rostriformis bugensis Andrusov, 1897

Sphaeriidae

- Musculium lacustre (O. F. Müller, 1774)
- Pisidium amnicum (O. F. Müller, 1774)
- Pisidium casertanum (Poli, 1791)
- Pisidium henslowanum (Sheppard, 1823)
- Pisidium moitessierianum Paladilhe, 1866
- Pisidium nitidum Jenyns, 1832
- Pisidium personatum Malm, 1855
- Pisidium subtruncatum Malm, 1855
- Pisidium supinum A. Schmidt, 1851
- Sphaerium corneum (Linnaeus, 1758)
- Sphaerium rivicola (Lamarck, 1818)
- Sphaerium solidum (Normand, 1844)

Unionidae

- Anodonta anatina (Linnaeus, 1758)
- Pseudanodonta complanata (Rossmässler, 1835)
- Sinanodonta woodiana (Lea, 1834)
- Unio crassus Philipsson, 1788
- Unio pictorum (Linnaeus, 1758)
- Unio tumidus Philipsson, 1788

== See also ==
Lists of molluscs of surrounding countries:

- List of non-marine molluscs of Austria
- List of non-marine molluscs of Slovakia
- List of non-marine molluscs of Ukraine
- List of non-marine molluscs of Romania
- List of non-marine molluscs of Serbia
- List of non-marine molluscs of Croatia
- List of non-marine molluscs of Slovenia
