= List of non-marine molluscs of Latvia =

Location of Latvia

There are 159 species of non-marine molluscs living in the wild in Latvia. In addition there are at least 9 gastropod species living only in as hothouse aliens in greenhouses, aquaria and terraria.

There are 129 species of gastropods, 43 species of freshwater gastropods, 86 species of land gastropods and 30 species of bivalves living in the wild.

Summary table of number of species

(Summary table is based on species counted in this list and include also those ones with question marks)

	Latvia
freshwater gastropods	43
land gastropods	86
gastropods altogether	129
bivalves	30
molluscs altogether	159
non-indigenous gastropods in the wild	?? freshwater and ?? land
non-indigenous hot-house alien gastropods	9
non-indigenous bivalves in the wild	?
non-indigenous hot-house alien bivalves	no
non-indigenous molluscs altogether	?

== Systematic list ==
The list is divided into freshwater and land species and then arranged in zoological order. The list is complete.

=== Freshwater gastropods ===
Species of non-marine gastropods in Latvia include:

Neritidae

- Theodoxus fluviatilis (Linnaeus, 1758)

Viviparidae

- Viviparus viviparus (Millet, 1813)
- Viviparus contectus (Linnaeus, 1758)

Hydrobiidae

- Hydrobia ulvae (Pennant, 1777)
- Hydrobia stagnalis (Baster, 1765)
- Potamopyrgus antipodarum (Gray, 1843)
- Marstoniopsis scholtzi (A. Schmidt, 1856)

Lithoglyphidae

- Lithoglyphus naticoides C. Pfeiffer, 1828

Bithyniidae

- Bithynia tentaculata (Linnaeus, 1758)
- Bithynia leachii (Sheppard, 1823)

Valvatidae

- Valvata cristata O. F. Müller, 1774
- Valvata pulchella Studer, 1820
- Valvata piscinalis (O. F. Müller, 1774)

Acroloxidae

- Acroloxus lacustris (Linnaeus, 1758)

Lymnaeidae

- Galba truncatula (O. F. Müller, 1774)
- Stagnicola palustris (O. F. Müller, 1774)
- Stagnicola fuscus (C. Pfeiffer, 1821)
- Stagnicola corvus (Gmelin, 1791)
- Radix auricularia (Linnaeus, 1758)
- Radix ampla (Hartmann, 1821)
- Radix peregra (O. F. Müller, 1774)
- Radix balthica (Linnaeus, 1758)
- Myxas glutinosa (O. F. Müller, 1774)
- Lymnaea stagnalis (Linnaeus, 1758)

Physidae

- Aplexa hypnorum (Linnaeus, 1758)
- Physa fontinalis (Linnaeus, 1758)

Planorbidae

- Planorbarius corneus (Linnaeus, 1758)
- Planorbis planorbis (Linnaeus, 1758)
- Planorbis carinatus O. F. Müller, 1774
- Anisus spirorbis (Linnaeus, 1758)
- Anisus leucostoma (Millet, 1813)
- Anisus vortex (Linnaeus, 1758)
- Anisus vorticulus (Troschel, 1834)
- Bathyomphalus contortus (Linnaeus, 1758)
- Gyraulus albus (O. F. Müller, 1774)
- Gyraulus acronicus (A. Fėrussak, 1807)
- Gyraulus laevis (Alder, 1838)
- Gyraulus riparius (Westerlund, 1865)
- Gyraulus rossmaessleri (Auerswald, 1851)
- Gyraulus crista (Linnaeus, 1758)
- Hippeutis complanatus (Linnaeus, 1758)
- Segmentina nitida (O. F. Müller, 1774)
- Ancylus fluviatilis O. F. Müller, 1774

=== Land gastropods ===
Aciculidae

- Platyla polita (Hartmann, 1840)

Ellobiidae

- Carychium minimum (O. F. Müller, 1774)
- Carychium tridentatum (Risso, 1826)

Cochlicopidae

- Cochlicopa lubrica (O. F. Müller, 1774)
- Cochlicopa lubricella (Porro, 1838)
- Cochlicopa nitens (Gallenstein, 1848)

Lauriidae

- Lauria cylindracea (Da Costa, 1778)

Pupillidae

- Pupilla muscorum (Linnaeus, 1758)

Valloniidae

- Vallonia costata (O. F. Müller, 1774)
- Vallonia pulchella (O. F. Müller, 1774)
- Vallonia excentrica Sterki, 1893
- Acanthinula aculeata (O. F. Müller, 1774)
- Spermodea lamellata (Jeffreys, 1830)

Vertiginidae

- Columella edentula (Draparnaud, 1805)
- Columella aspera Waldėn, 1966
- Truncatellina cylindrica (A. Ferussac, 1807)
- Vertigo pusilla O. F. Müller, 1774
- Vertigo antivertigo (Draparnaud, 1801)
- Vertigo substriata (Jeffreys, 1833)
- Vertigo pygmaea (Draparnaud, 1801)
- Vertigo lilljeborgi (Westerlund, 1871)
- Vertigo genesii (Gredler, 1856)
- Vertigo geyeri Lindholm, 1925
- Vertigo ronnebyensis (Westerlund, 1871)
- Vertigo alpestris Alder, 1838
- Vertigo angustior Jeffreys, 1830

Enidae

- Ena montana (Draparnaud, 1801)
- Merdigera obscura (O. F. Müller, 1774)

Clausiliidae

- Cochlodina laminata (Montagu, 1803)
- Cochlodina orthostoma (Menke, 1828)
- Ruthenica filograna (Rossmässler, 1836)
- Macrogastra ventricosa (Draparnaud, 1801)
- Macrogastra plicatula (Draparnaud, 1801)
- Macrogastra borealis (Boettger, 1878) - synonym: Macrogastra latestriata (A. Schmidt, 1857)
- Clausilia bidentata (Ström, 1765)
- Clausilia cruciata (Studer, 1820)
- Clausilia pumila C. Pfeiffer, 1828
- Clausilia dubia Draparnaud, 1805
- Laciniaria plicata (Draparnaud, 1801)
- Balea biplicata (Montagu, 1803)
- Bulgarica cana (Held, 1836)

Succineidae

- Succinea putris (Linnaeus, 1758)
- Succinella oblonga (Draparnaud, 1801)
- Oxyloma elegans (Risso, 1826)

Ferussaciidae

- Cecilioides acicula (O. F. Müller, 1774) - nonindigenous since 2006

Punctidae

- Punctum pygmaeum (Draparnaud, 1801)

Discidae

- Discus ruderatus (A. Ferussac, 1821)
- Discus rotundatus (O. F. Müller, 1774)

Gastrodontidae

- Zonitoides nitidus (O. F. Müller, 1774)

Euconulidae

- Euconulus fulvus (O. F. Müller, 1774)
- Euconulus alderi (Gray, 1840)

Vitrinidae

- Vitrina pellucida (O. F. Müller, 1774)

Zonitidae

- Vitrea crystallina (O. F. Müller, 1774)
- Vitrea contracta (Westerlund, 1871)

Oxychilidae

- Aegopinella pura (Alder, 1830)
- Aegopinella nitidula (Draparnaud, 1805)
- Perpolita hammonis (Strøm, 1765)
- Perpolita petronella (L. Pfeiffer, 1853)
- Oxychilus cellarius (O. F. Müller, 1774)
- Oxychilus draparnaudi (Beck, 1837)
- Oxychilus alliarius (Miller, 1822)

Limacidae

- Limax cinereoniger Wolf, 1803
- Limax maximus Linnaeus, 1758
- Limacus flavus (Linnaeus, 1758)
- Malacolimax tenellus (O. F. Müller, 1774)
- Lehmannia marginata (O. F. Müller, 1774)

Agriolimacidae

- Deroceras laeve (O. F. Müller, 1774)
- ? Deroceras agreste Linnaeus, 1758 - marked with question mark in reference
- Deroceras reticulatum (O. F. Müller, 1774)

Arionidae

- Arion subfuscus (Draparnaud, 1805)
- Arion circumscriptus Johnston, 1828
- Arion fasciatus (Nilsson, 1823)
- Arion silvaticus Lohmander, 1937
- ? Arion distinctus Mabille, 1868 - marked with question mark in reference
- ? Arion hortensis A. Fėrussac, 1819 - marked with question mark in reference

Bradybaenidae

- Fruticicola fruticum (O. F. Müller, 1774)

Hygromiidae

- Euomphalia strigella (Draparnaud, 1801)
- Trichia hispida (Linnaeus, 1758)
- Xerolenta obvia (Menke, 1828)
- Pseudotrichia rubiginosa (Rossmässler, 1838)

Helicidae

- Arianta arbustorum (Linnaeus, 1758)
- Helicigona lapicida (Linnaeus, 1758)
- Isognomostoma isognomostomos (Schröter, 1784)
- Cepaea hortensis (O. F. Müller, 1774)
- Cepaea nemoralis (Linnaeus, 1758)
- Helix pomatia Linnaeus, 1758

=== Bivalvia ===
Species of freshwater bivalves in Latvia include:

Unionoida
Margaritiferidae

- Margaritifera margaritifera (Linnaeus, 1758)

Unionidae

- Unio pictorum (Linnaeus, 1758)
- Unio tumidus Philipsson, 1788
- Unio crassus Philipsson, 1788
- Anodonta anatina (O. F. Müller, 1774)
- Anodonta cygnea (Linnaeus, 1758)
- Pseudanodonta complanata (Rossmässler, 1835)

Veneroida
Sphaeriidae

- Sphaerium corneum (Linnaeus, 1758)
- Sphaerium nucleus (S. Studer, 1820)
- Sphaerium ovale (A. Férussac, 1807)
- Sphaerium rivicola (Lamarck, 1818)
- Sphaerium solidum (Normand, 1844)
- Musculium lacustre (O. F. Müller, 1774)
- Pisidium amnicum (O. F. Müller, 1774)
- Pisidium casertanum (Poli, 1791)
- Pisidium henslowanum (Sheppard, 1823)
- Pisidium hibernicum Westerlund, 1894
- Pisidium lilljeborgii Clessin, 1886
- Pisidium milium Held, 1836
- Pisidium nitidum Jenyns, 1832
- Pisidium obtusale (Lamarck, 1818)
- Pisidium personatum Malm, 1855
- Pisidium pulchellum Jenyns, 1832
- Pisidium subtruncatum Malm, 1855
- Pisidium supinum A. Schmidt, 1851

Dreissenidae

- Dreissena polymorpha (Pallas, 1771)

== Hothouse aliens ==
"Hothouse aliens" in Latvia include:

- Pomacea bridgesii
- Marisa cornuarietis
- Melanoides tuberculata
- Pseudosuccinea columella
- Physella acuta
- Helisoma trivolvis
- Achatina fulica
- Archachatina marginata
- Arion ater

== See also ==
Lists of molluscs of surrounding countries:

- List of non-marine molluscs of Sweden
