= Pisidium hodgkini =

Scientific classification
- Kingdom: Animalia
- Phylum: Mollusca
- Class: Bivalvia
- Order: Sphaeriida
- Family: Sphaeriidae
- Genus: Pisidium
- Species: P. hodgkini

Binomial name
- Pisidium hodgkini (Suter, 1905)

Synonyms
- Corneocyclas hodgkini Suter, 1905

Species of bivalve

Pisidium hodgkini is a freshwater bivalve of the family Sphaeriidae, which is found in New Zealand.
