= Sphaerium bequaerti =

Conservation status
- Data Deficient (IUCN 3.1)

Scientific classification
- Kingdom: Animalia
- Phylum: Mollusca
- Class: Bivalvia
- Order: Sphaeriida
- Family: Sphaeriidae
- Genus: Sphaerium
- Species: S. bequaerti

Binomial name
- Sphaerium bequaerti (Dautzenberg & Germain, 1914)

Species of bivalve

Sphaerium bequaerti is a species of bivalve in the Sphaeriidae family. It is found in Burundi, the Central African Republic, Malawi and Tanzania. Its natural habitat is freshwater lakes.
