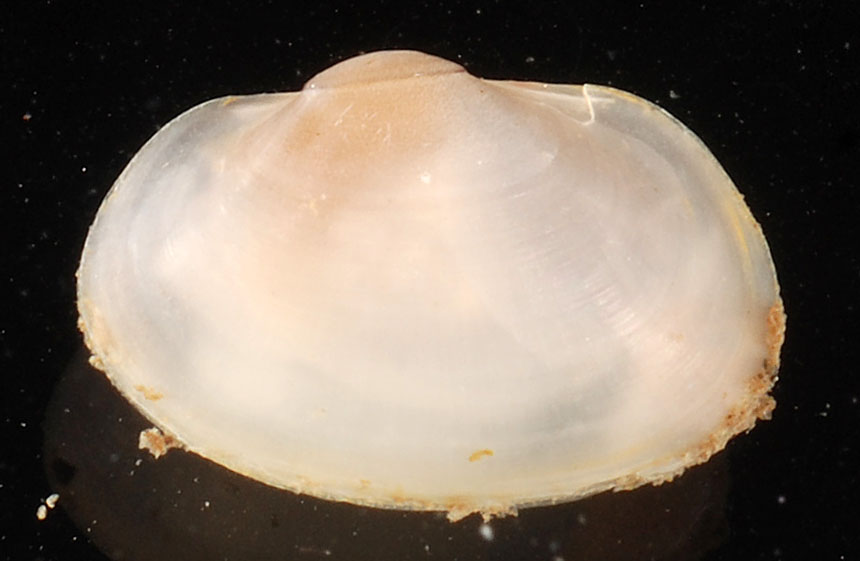

Conservation status
- Least Concern (IUCN 3.1)

- Secure (NatureServe)

Scientific classification
- Kingdom: Animalia
- Phylum: Mollusca
- Class: Bivalvia
- Order: Sphaeriida
- Family: Sphaeriidae
- Genus: Sphaerium
- Species: S. transversum

Binomial name
- Sphaerium transversum (Say, 1829)

Synonyms
- List: Cyclas transversa Say, 1829; Cyclas constricta Prime, 1853; Cyclas detruncata Prime, 1852; Cyclas gracilis Prime, 1852; Calyculina contracta (Prime, 1865); Calyculina transversa (Say, 1829); Musculium transversum (Say, 1829); Musculium transversum f. decisum Sterki, 1916; Paramusculium transversum (Say, 1829); Sphaerium (Musculium) transversum (Say, 1829); Sphaerium contractum Prime, 1865

= Sphaerium transversum =

Species of bivalve

Sphaerium transversum is a species of freshwater bivalve from the family Sphaeriidae. It is found in North America and Europe. It occurs in lakes, rivers, canals, and swamps.

== Distribution ==
Sphaerium transversum is widely distributed in North America (Mexico, USA, Canada). It also occurs in Western Europe (France, UK, the Netherlands and Germany) where it is an introduced species.
