= Sphaerium stuhlmanni =

Conservation status
- Least Concern (IUCN 3.1)

Scientific classification
- Kingdom: Animalia
- Phylum: Mollusca
- Class: Bivalvia
- Order: Sphaeriida
- Family: Sphaeriidae
- Genus: Sphaerium
- Species: S. stuhlmanni

Binomial name
- Sphaerium stuhlmanni Martens, 1897

Species of bivalve

Sphaerium stuhlmanni is a species of freshwater bivalve in the family Sphaeriidae. It is endemic to Lake Victoria in Kenya, Tanzania and Uganda. It occurs on muddy and sandy bottoms, typically in shallow waters (0–10 m depth) but potentially down to 50 m depth.
