= Sphaerium beckmani =

Sphaerium beckmani Temporal range: Maastrichtian

Scientific classification
- Kingdom: Animalia
- Phylum: Mollusca
- Class: Bivalvia
- Order: Sphaeriida
- Family: Sphaeriidae
- Genus: Sphaerium
- Species: †S. beckmani

Binomial name
- †Sphaerium beckmani Russell 1976

Extinct species of bivalve

Sphaerium beckmani is an extinct species of fossil freshwater pea clams from the Late Cretaceous deposits of North America. This species was first described by the American paleontologist Loris Shano Russell in 1976. The specimens were collected by the American paleontologist Karl M. Waage from 1961 to 1962 from the Hell Creek Formation of eastern Montana. The locality is dated to the late Maastrichtian Age (around 66.0 to 72.1 million years ago).
