= Sphaerium nitidum =

Conservation status
- Least Concern (IUCN 3.1)

- Secure (NatureServe)

Scientific classification
- Kingdom: Animalia
- Phylum: Mollusca
- Class: Bivalvia
- Order: Sphaeriida
- Family: Sphaeriidae
- Genus: Sphaerium
- Species: S. nitidum

Binomial name
- Sphaerium nitidum Clessin, 1876

Species of bivalve

Sphaerium nitidum is a species of mollusc belonging to the family Sphaeriidae.

Its native range is Subarctic.
