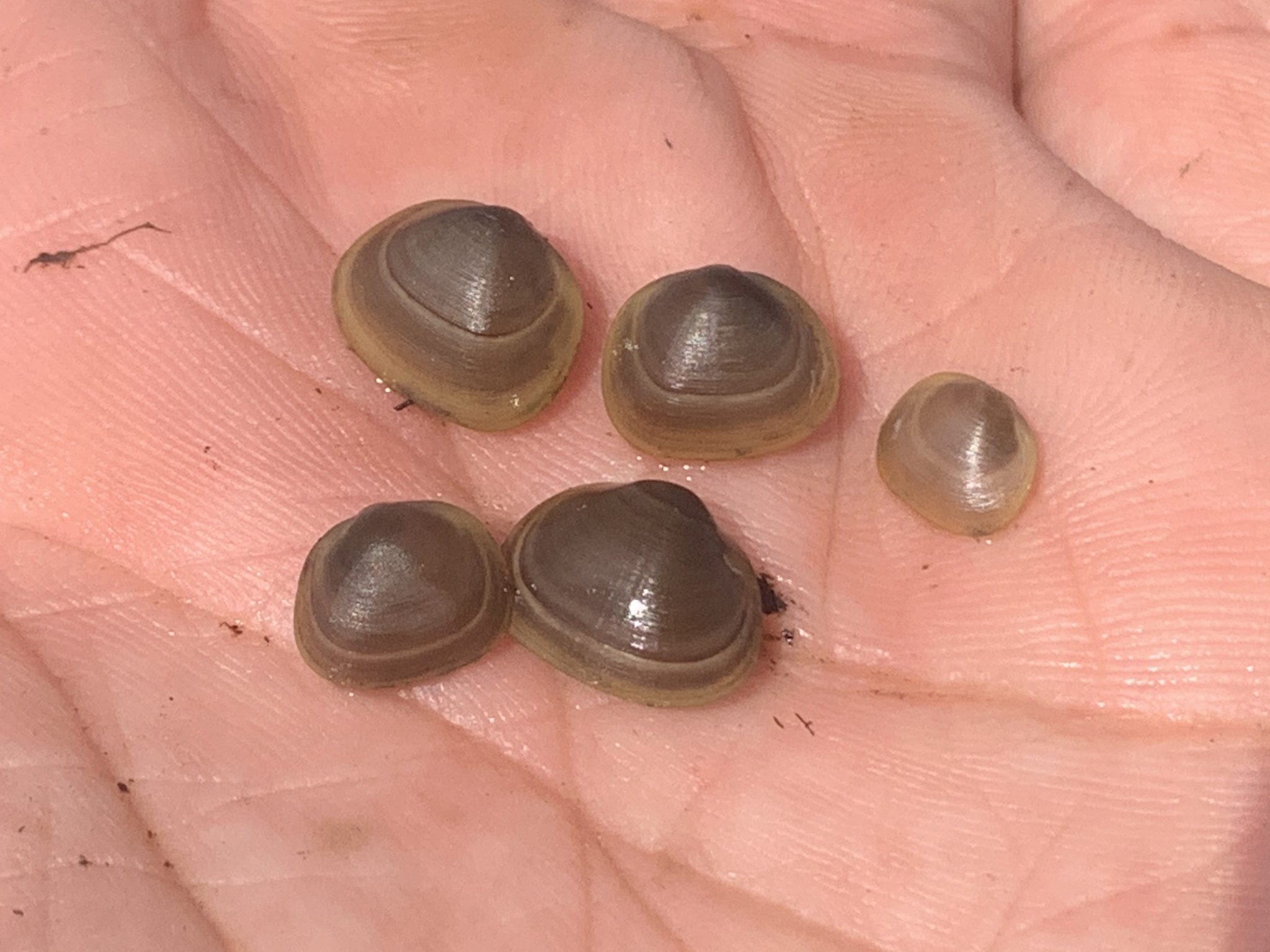

Conservation status
- Least Concern (IUCN 3.1)

- Secure (NatureServe)

Scientific classification
- Kingdom: Animalia
- Phylum: Mollusca
- Class: Bivalvia
- Order: Sphaeriida
- Superfamily: Sphaerioidea
- Family: Sphaeriidae
- Genus: Sphaerium
- Species: S. rhomboideum

Binomial name
- Sphaerium rhomboideum (Say, 1822)

Synonyms
- Cyclas rhomboidea Say, 1822; Cyclas elegans Adams, 1840

= Sphaerium rhomboideum =

Species of bivalve

Sphaerium rhomboideum, the rhomboid fingernailclam, is a species of freshwater clams in the family Sphaeriidae. It is found in North America.
