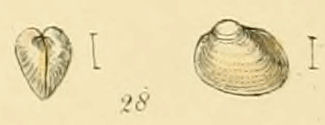

Conservation status
- Least Concern (IUCN 3.1)

- Secure (NatureServe)

Scientific classification
- Kingdom: Animalia
- Phylum: Mollusca
- Class: Bivalvia
- Order: Sphaeriida
- Superfamily: Sphaerioidea
- Family: Sphaeriidae
- Genus: Euglesa
- Species: E. casertana

Binomial name
- Euglesa casertana (Poli, 1791)

Synonyms
- List: Cardium casertanum Poli, 1791; Cingulipisidium (Potamopisidium) likharevi Korniushin, 1991; Conventus (Conventus) watsoni (Paiva, 1886); Cyclas (Pisidium) abditum Haldeman, 1841; Cyclas fontinalis Draparnaud, 1805; Cyclas lenticularis Normand, 1844; Cyclas minor Adams, 1842; Cyclas steenbuchi Møller, 1842; Cyclas vitrea Risso, 1826; Euglesa (Casertiana) altiumbonata Starobogatov & Budnikova, 1985; Euglesa (Casertiana) ambigua Starobogatov & Budnikova, 1985; Euglesa (Casertiana) buchtarmensis Krivosheina, 1978; Euglesa (Casertiana) crimeana Stadnichenko, 1980; Euglesa (Casertiana) curta (Clessin, 1874); Euglesa (Casertiana) elliptica (Mori, 1938); Euglesa (Casertiana) hokkaidoensis Starobogatov, 2004; Euglesa (Casertiana) hoyeri (Clessin, 1886); Euglesa (Casertiana) inflata (Mori, 1938); Euglesa (Casertiana) intermedia (Gassies, 1855); Euglesa (Casertiana) jaudouiniana (Gassies, 1855); Euglesa (Casertiana) klucharevae Starobogatov & Budnikova, 1985; Euglesa (Casertiana) miyadii Starobogatov, 2004; Euglesa (Casertiana) obensis Anistratenko & Dolgin, 1991; Euglesa (Casertiana) rivularis (Clessin, 1874); Euglesa (Casertiana) subcinerea Starobogatov & Budnikova, 1985; Euglesa (Casertiana) subdepressa Starobogatov & Budnikova, 1985; Euglesa (Casertiana) subfossarina Starobogatov & Budnikova, 1985; Euglesa (Casertiana) subplanata Starobogatov & Budnikova, 1985; Euglesa (Cingulipisidium) hissarica Izzatullaev & Starobogatov, 1985; Euglesa (Cingulipisidium) koltschemensis Zatravkin, 1987; Euglesa (Euglesa) altiumbonata Starobogatov & Budnikova, 1985; Euglesa (Euglesa) ambigua Starobogatov & Budnikova, 1985; Euglesa (Euglesa) buchtarmensis Krivosheina, 1978; Euglesa (Euglesa) casertana (Poli, 1791); Euglesa (Euglesa) crimeana Stadnichenko, 1980; Euglesa (Euglesa) curta (Clessin, 1874); Euglesa (Euglesa) dymy Stadnichenko, 1980; Euglesa (Euglesa) elliptica (Mori, 1938); Euglesa (Euglesa) hokkaidoensis Starobogatov, 2004; Euglesa (Euglesa) hoyeri (Clessin, 1886); Euglesa (Euglesa) inflata (Mori, 1938); Euglesa (Euglesa) intermedia (Gassies, 1855); Euglesa (Euglesa) jaudouiniana (Gassies, 1855); Euglesa (Euglesa) klucharevae Starobogatov & Budnikova, 1985; Euglesa (Euglesa) koltschemensis Zatravkin, 1987; Euglesa (Euglesa) likharevi (Korniushin, 1991); Euglesa (Euglesa) miyadii Starobogatov, 2004; Euglesa (Euglesa) nikkoensis (Mori, 1938); Euglesa (Euglesa) obensis Anistratenko & Dolgin, 1991; Euglesa (Euglesa) obliquata (Clessin, 1874); Euglesa (Euglesa) platyponderosa Starobogatov & Korniushin, 1991; Euglesa (Euglesa) rivularis (Clessin, 1874); Euglesa (Euglesa) solodovnikovi Stadnichenko, 1983; Euglesa (Euglesa) steenbuchi (Møller, 1842); Euglesa (Euglesa) subcinerea Starobogatov & Budnikova, 1985; Euglesa (Euglesa) subdepressa Starobogatov & Budnikova, 1985; Euglesa (Euglesa) subfossarina Starobogatov & Budnikova, 1985; Euglesa (Euglesa) subinflata (Mori, 1938); Euglesa (Euglesa) subplanata Starobogatov & Budnikova, 1985; Euglesa (Potamopisidium) koltschemensis Zatravkin, 1987; Euglesa (Potamopisidium) likharevi (Korniushin, 1991); Euglesa (Potamopisidium) steenbuchi (Møller, 1842); Euglesa (Roseana) rosea (Scholtz, 1843); Euglesa buchtarmensis Krivosheina, 1978; Euglesa obliquata (Clessin, 1874); Galileja casertana (Poli, 1791); Pisidium (Euglesa) casertanum (Poli, 1791); Pisidium (Fluminina) atlasicum Pallary, 1915; Pisidium (Rivulina) casertanum (Poli, 1791); Pisidium abditum (Haldeman, 1841); Pisidium abditum huachucanum Pilsbry & Ferriss, 1906; Pisidium abditum var. lacteum Sterki, 1916; Pisidium albidum Sterki, 1911; Pisidium alleni Sterki, 1912; Pisidium amplum Prime, 1860; Pisidium anceps Herrington, 1954; Pisidium arcticum Westerlund, 1883; Pisidium arcuatum Prime, 1852; Pisidium ashmuni Sterki, 1903; Pisidium atlanticum Sterki, 1905; Pisidium australe Philippi, 1836; Pisidium berryi Herrington, 1954; Pisidium calyculatum Dupuy, 1849; Pisidium canariense Shuttleworth, 1852; Pisidium capax Herrington, 1954; Pisidium casertanum (Poli, 1791); Pisidium cedrorum Clessin, 1875; Pisidium cinereum Alder, 1838; Pisidium cinereum inflatum Mori, 1938; Pisidium cinereum nikkoense Mori, 1938; Pisidium cinereum subinflatum Mori, 1938; Pisidium cinetum Herrington, 1954; Pisidium columbianum Sterki, 1913; Pisidium complanatum Sterki, 1903; Pisidium concinnulum Herrington, 1954; Pisidium cuneiforme Sterki, 1903; Pisidium danielsi Sterki, 1903; Pisidium devium Herrington, 1954; Pisidium dispar Sterki, 1911; Pisidium edouardi Kuiper, 1953; Pisidium egregium Herrington, 1954; Pisidium ellipticum Mori, 1938; Pisidium eyerdami Herrington, 1954; Pisidium fabale Sterki, 1916; Pisidium fidalgoense Herrington, 1954; Pisidium fossarinum Clessin, 1873; Pisidium fossarinum Westerlund, 1873; Pisidium fossarinum var. areolatum Clessin, 1874; Pisidium fossarinum var. curtum Clessin, 1874; Pisidium fossarinum var. flavescens Clessin, 1874; Pisidium fossarinum var. kampmanni Piaget, 1913; Pisidium fossarinum var. modestum Clessin, 1874; Pisidium fragillimum Sterki, 1906; Pisidium friersoni Sterki, 1906; Pisidium furcatum Sterki, 1913; Pisidium furcatum var. rhombicum Sterki, 1913; Pisidium glaciale Westerlund, 1883; Pisidium globulosum Gassies, 1855; Pisidium griseolum Sterki, 1922; Pisidium hannai Sterki, 1916; Pisidium harfordianum Prime, 1869; Pisidium heldenreichii Clessin, 1874; Pisidium hispanicum Clessin, 1874; Pisidium hoyeri Clessin, 1886; Pisidium huachucanum Pilsbry & Ferriss, 1906; Pisidium hydaspicola Theobald, 1876; Pisidium ibericum Clessin, 1873; Pisidium intermedium Gassies, 1855; Pisidium iratianum Dupuy, 1849; Pisidium isabellaneum Herrington, 1954; Pisidium jaudouinianum Gassies, 1855; Pisidium jenynsii Macgillivray, 1843; Pisidium joannis Macgillivray, 1843; Pisidium kurtzii Prime, 1852; Pisidium lenticulare (Normand, 1844); Pisidium levissimum Sterki, 1906; Pisidium limosum Gassies, 1849; Pisidium loveni Clessin, 1890; Pisidium lucidum Sterki, 1923; Pisidium lumstenianum Forbes, 1838; Pisidium mamillanum Herrington, 1954; Pisidium maroccanum Pallary, 1936; Pisidium mighelsianum Clessin, 1877; Pisidium mirum Sterki, 1923; Pisidium neglectum Sterki, 1906; Pisidium neglectum var. corpulentum Sterki, 1906; Pisidium neglectum var. corpulentum Sterki, 1916; Pisidium nevadense Sterki, 1913; Pisidium nevadense var. modicum Sterki, 1913; Pisidium nivale Westerlund, 1883; Pisidium notatum Prime, 1852; Pisidium noveboracense Prime, 1858; Pisidium noveboracense var. alabamense Sterki, 1906; Pisidium noveboracense var. elevatum Sterki, 1906; Pisidium noveboracense var. expansum Sterki, 1906; Pisidium noveboracense var. fraternum Sterki, 1906; Pisidium noveboracense var. lineatum Sterki, 1906; Pisidium noveboracense var. proclive Sterki, 1906; Pisidium noveboracense var. quadrulum Sterki, 1906; Pisidium obliquatum Clessin, 1874; Pisidium obscurum Prime, 1852; Pisidium occidentale Newcomb, 1861; Pisidium orcasense Sterki, 1922; Pisidium paradoxum Sterki, 1922; Pisidium planatum Ancey, 1906; Pisidium plenum Prime, 1860; Pisidium politum Sterki, 1895; Pisidium politum var. decorum Sterki, 1916; Pisidium proximum Sterki, 1906; Pisidium randolphii Roper, 1896; Pisidium regulare Prime, 1852; Pisidium resartum Prime, 1860; Pisidium retusum Prime, 1860; Pisidium rivulare Clessin, 1874; Pisidium roperi Sterki, 1898; Pisidium roseum Scholtz, 1843; Pisidium rotundum de Cessac, 1855; Pisidium rowelli Sterki, 1903; Pisidium rubellum Prime, 1852; Pisidium rubrum Prime, 1860; Pisidium rugosulum Herrington, 1954; Pisidium ruwenzoriense Germain, 1911; Pisidium sinuatum Bourguignat, 1851; Pisidium streatori Sterki, 1901; Pisidium strengii Sterki, 1902; Pisidium striggillum Herrington, 1954; Pisidium subrotundum Sterki, 1906; Pisidium subrotundum var. canadense Sterki, 1916; Pisidium subrotundum var. olofi Sterki, 1916; Pisidium subrotundum var. pumilum Sterki, 1916; Pisidium succineum Sterki, 1907; Pisidium superius Sterki, 1907; Pisidium taiwanense Kuroda, 1941; Pisidium tenellum Gould, 1850; Pisidium thermale Dupuy, 1849; Pisidium trapezoideum Sterki, 1896; Pisidium trapezoideum var. protensum Sterki, 1916; Pisidium zoctanum Poli, 1876; Pisidium zonatum Prime, 1852; Sphaerium costaricanum von Martens, 1900

= Euglesa casertana =

Species of bivalve

Euglesa casertanum, the pea cockle or pea clam, is a minute freshwater bivalve mollusc of the family Sphaeriidae.

== Description ==
The shell is broad, sub-triangular or oval and is ornamented with sculpture of faint concentric striations. The umbos are slightly behind the middle. The Periostracum is silky, scarcely glossy. In colour it is whitish to grey-brown and often the shell is coated with reddish-brown deposits.

The shell is of similar shape to Sphaerium novaezelandiae but is smaller as an adult, more inflated, with a deeper hinge-plate, stronger teeth, and the ligament is not visible externally.

Length is up to 4.5 mm, height 3.7 mm, and thickness 2.3 mm.

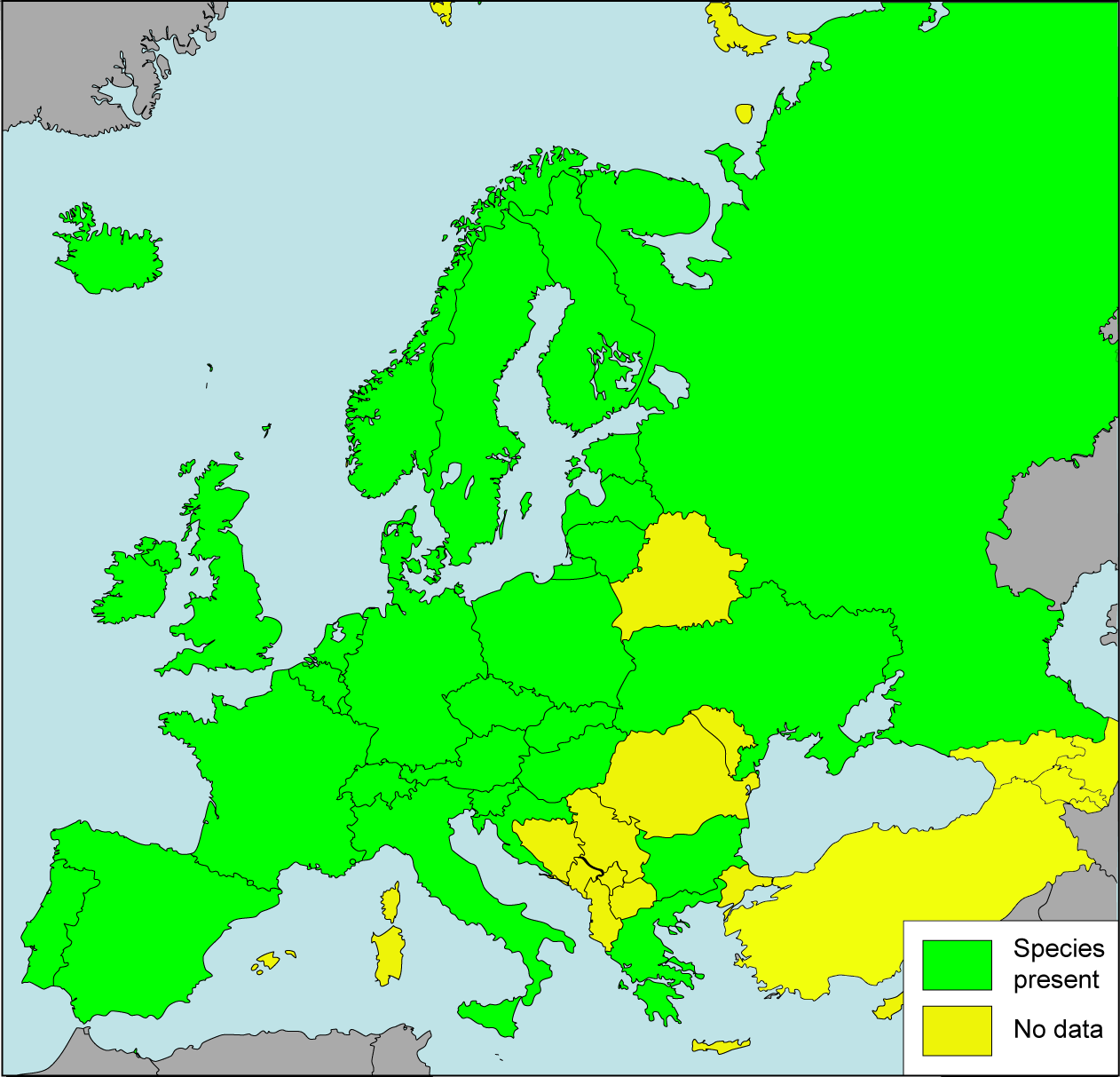
Pisidium casertanum Presence in European countries

== Distribution ==
It has a cosmopolitan distribution and is perhaps the world's widely distributed non-marine mollusc.

- British Isles - common
- Ireland
- Czech Republic - in Bohemia, in Moravia, least concern (LC)
- Slovakia
- Germany - distributed in whole Germany. High endangered (Stark gefährdet) in Hesse, critically endangered (vom Aussterben bedroht) in Saxony. Pisidium casertanum ponderosum endangered (gefährdet) in Brandenburg.
- Latvia
- Netherlands
- New Zealand - common
- Nordic countries: Denmark, Faroes, Finland, Iceland, Norway and Sweden
- Poland
