= Sphaerium asiaticum =

Conservation status
- Least Concern (IUCN 3.1)

Scientific classification
- Kingdom: Animalia
- Phylum: Mollusca
- Class: Bivalvia
- Order: Sphaeriida
- Family: Sphaeriidae
- Genus: Sphaerium
- Species: S. asiaticum

Binomial name
- Sphaerium asiaticum (von Martens, 1864)

Species of bivalve

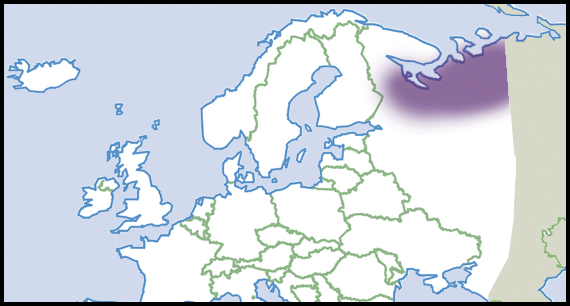
Native range of the species

Sphaerium asiaticum is a species of bivalve belonging to the family Sphaeriidae.

Per IUCN, the species has the status "least concern".
