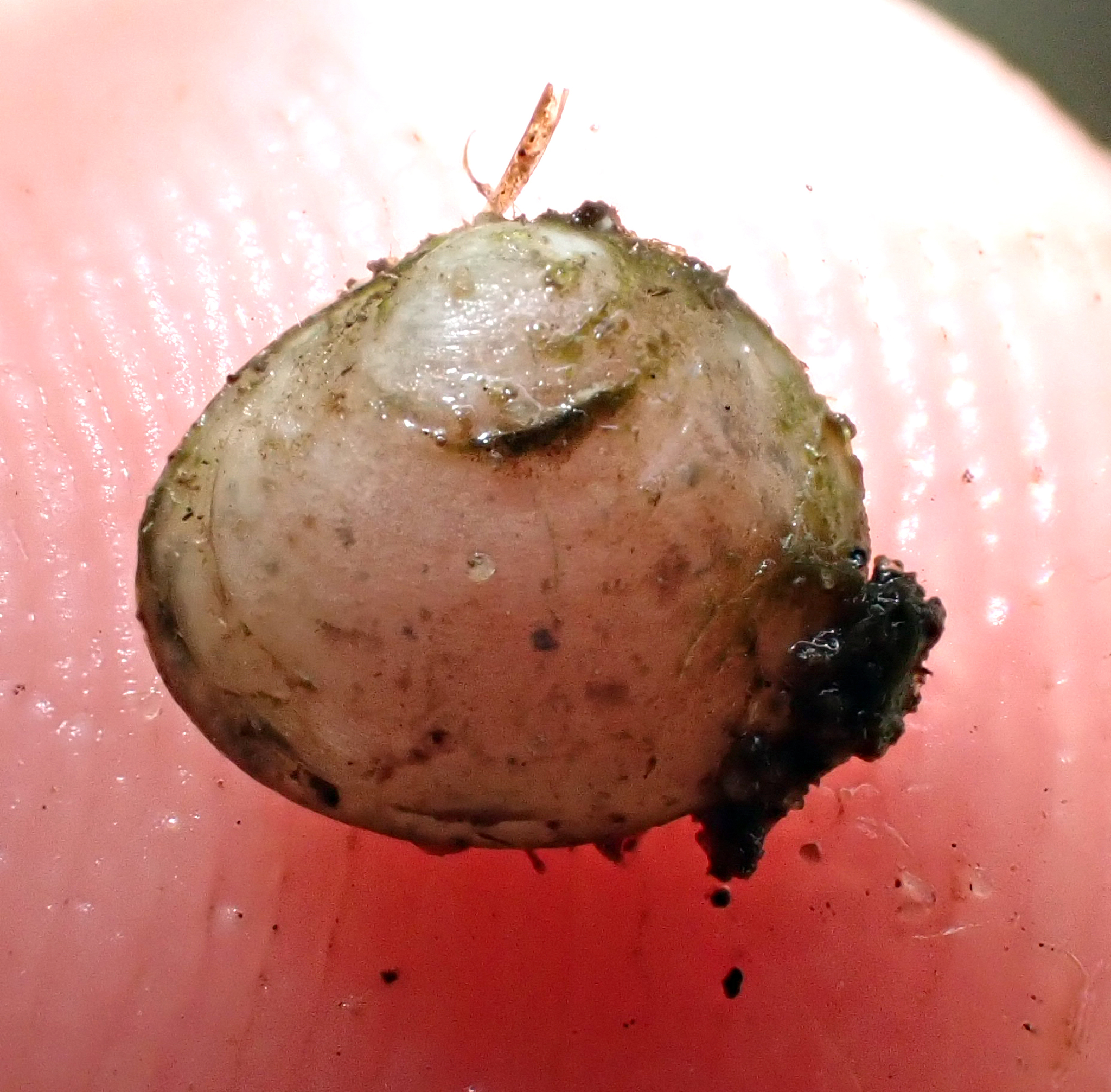

Conservation status
- Least Concern (IUCN 3.1)

- Not Threatened (NZ TCS)

Scientific classification
- Kingdom: Animalia
- Phylum: Mollusca
- Class: Bivalvia
- Order: Sphaeriida
- Family: Sphaeriidae
- Genus: Sphaerium
- Species: S. novaezelandiae

Binomial name
- Sphaerium novaezelandiae Deshayes, 1854

Synonyms
- Sphaerium novae-zelandiae Deshayes, 1854; Sphaerium lenticular Dunker, 1862; Sphaerium novae-zelandiae Suter, 1913

= Sphaerium novaezelandiae =

Species of bivalve

Sphaerium novaezelandiae is a very small freshwater clam, an aquatic bivalve mollusc, in the family Sphaeriidae, sometimes known as the fingernail clams. It is native to New Zealand.
