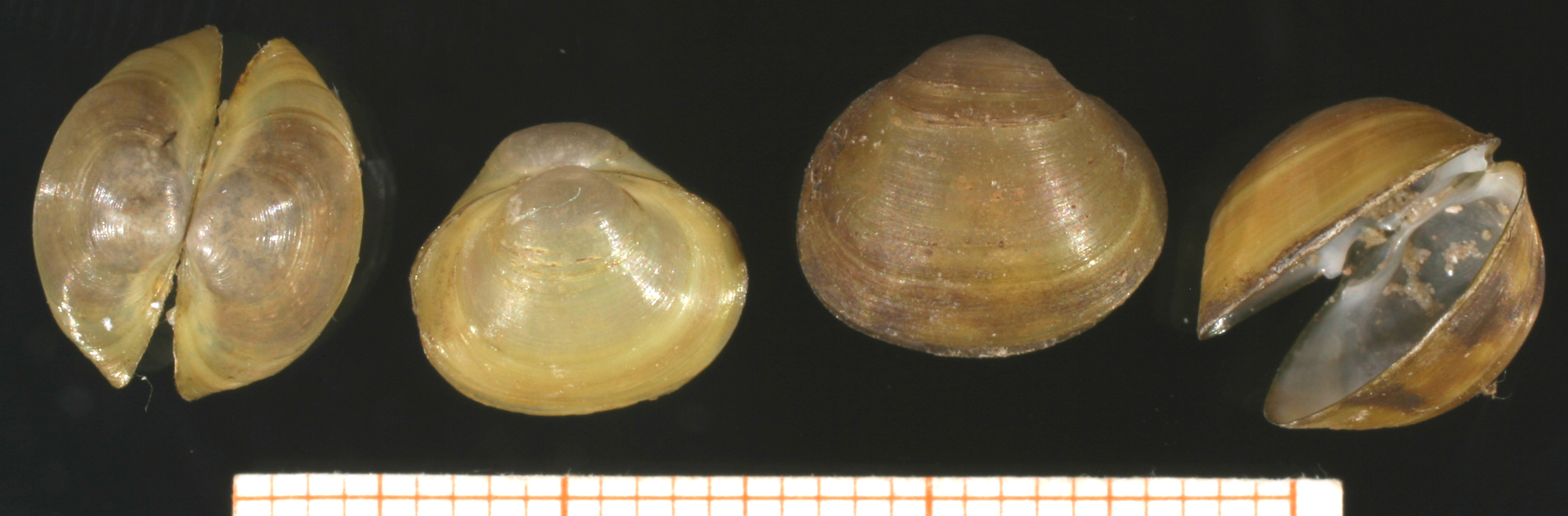
- Sphaerium corneum
- Live Sphaerium sp. moving around with its foot. Collected from a pond in Portland, Oregon

Scientific classification
- Kingdom: Animalia
- Phylum: Mollusca
- Class: Bivalvia
- Order: Sphaeriida
- Superfamily: Sphaerioidea
- Family: Sphaeriidae
- Genus: Sphaerium; Scopoli, 1777

Species
- See text.

Synonyms
- List: Amesoda Rafinesque, 1820; Amesoda (Asiocyclas) Starobogatov & Korniushin, 1986; Amesoda (Clessinicyclas) Alimov & Starobogatov, 1968; Amesoda (Cyrenastrum) Bourguignat, 1854; Amesodon Agassiz, 1846; Calyculina Clessin, 1872; Clessinicyclas Alimov & Starobogatov, 1968; Cornea Megerle von Mühlfeld, 1811; Corneocyclas J. B. Férussac, 1818; Corneola Westerlund, 1873; Cycladea Rafinesque, 1815; Cycladites Krüger, 1823; Cyclas Lamarck, 1798; Cyclas (Amesoda) Rafinesque, 1820; Cyclas (Cyclas) Lamarck, 1798; Cyclas (Phymesoda) Rafinesque, 1820; Cyclas (Securilla) Drouët, 1855; Cyclas (Sphaerium) Scopoli, 1777; Cyclocalyx (Sphaerinova) Iredale, 1943; Cyclus Jurine, 1817; Cyrena (Corneocyclas) Blainville, 1818; Cyrena (Cyclas) Lamarck, 1798; Cyrena (Sphaerium) Scopoli, 1777; Musculium Link, 1807; Musculium (Morimusculium) Starobogatov, 1986; Musculium (Musculium) Link, 1807; Musculium (Paramusculium) Alimov & Starobogatov, 1968; Musculium (Parvimusculium) Starobogatov & Kornjushin, 1986; Musculium (Patagomusculium) Starobogatov, 1986; Musculium (Sphaerinova) Iredale, 1943; Nucleocyclas Alimov & Starobogatov, 1968; Nux Humphrey, 1797; Paramusculium Alimov & Starobogatov, 1968; Phymesoda Rafinesque, 1820; Primella Cooper, 1892 · unaccepted; Pseudocorbicula Dautzenberg, 1908; Rivicoliana Servain, 1888; Shadinicyclas Starobogatov & Korniushin, 1986; Sphaeriastrum Bourguignat, 1854; Sphaerinova Iredale, 1943; Sphaerinova (Asiomusculium) Starobogatov & Korniushin, 1986; Sphaerium (Amesoda) Rafinesque, 1820; Sphaerium (Baicaliana) Korniushin, 1996; Sphaerium (Corneana) Servain, 1888; Sphaerium (Corneola) Westerlund, 1873; Sphaerium (Cyclas) Lamarck, 1798; Sphaerium (Cyrenastrum) Bourguignat, 1854; Sphaerium (Herringtonium) A. H. Clarke, 1973; Sphaerium (Lacustriana) Servain, 1888; Sphaerium (Musculium) Link, 1807; Sphaerium (Nucleocyclas) Alimov & Starobogatov, 1968; Sphaerium (Pseudocorbicula) Dautzenberg, 1908; Sphaerium (Rivicoliana) Servain, 1888; Sphaerium (Serratisphaerium) Germain, 1909; Sphaerium (Sibirisphaerium) Slugina & Starobogatov, 1994; Sphaerium (Solidiana) Servain, 1888; Sphaerium (Sphaeriastrum) Bourguignat, 1854; Sphaerium (Sphaerinova) Iredale, 1943; Sphaerium (Sphaerium) Scopoli, 1777; Zecyclas Starobogatov, 1968

= Sphaerium =

Genus of bivalves

Sphaerium is a genus of very small freshwater clams, aquatic bivalve molluscs in the family Sphaeriidae, known as the fingernail clams. The small clams in this genus are unusual in that many of them, such as Sphaerium corneum, can climb around underwater on aquatic plants, using their long and strong foot.

== Selected species ==
The following species are included in the genus Sphaerium:

- Sphaerium asiaticum (E. von Martens, 1864)
- †Sphaerium beckmani L. S. Russell, 1976
- Sphaerium bequaerti (Dautzenberg & Germain, 1914)
- Sphaerium corneum (Linnaeus, 1758) – European fingernail clam
- Sphaerium lacustre (O. F. Müller, 1774)
- Sphaerium nitidum Clessin, 1876 – Arctic fingernail clam
- Sphaerium novaezelandiae Deshayes, 1855
- Sphaerium nucleus (Studer, 1820)
- Sphaerium ovale (A. Férussac, 1807)
- Sphaerium rhomboideum (Say, 1822)
- Sphaerium rivicola (Lamarck, 1818)
- Sphaerium solidum (Normand, 1844)
- Sphaerium stuhlmanni E. von Martens, 1897
- Sphaerium transversum (Say, 1829)
