= Oxychilus hydatinus =

Scientific classification
- Domain: Eukaryota
- Kingdom: Animalia
- Phylum: Mollusca
- Class: Gastropoda
- Order: Stylommatophora
- Family: Oxychilidae
- Genus: Oxychilus
- Species: O. hydatinus

Binomial name
- Oxychilus hydatinus (Rossmässler, 1838)

Species of gastropod

Oxychilus hydatinus is a species of air-breathing land snail, a terrestrial pulmonate gastropod mollusk in the family Oxychilidae.

== Distribution ==
This species is known to occur in:

- Hungary
- Slovakia
