= Sphaerium nucleus =

Conservation status
- Least Concern (IUCN 3.1)

Scientific classification
- Kingdom: Animalia
- Phylum: Mollusca
- Class: Bivalvia
- Order: Sphaeriida
- Family: Sphaeriidae
- Genus: Sphaerium
- Species: S. nucleus

Binomial name
- Sphaerium nucleus (Studer, 1820)

Synonyms
- Sphaerium corneum var. nucleus; Cyclas nucleus Studer, 1820

Species of bivalve

Sphaerium nucleus is a freshwater bivalve of the family Sphaeriidae. It has been often confused with Sphaerium corneum and is consequently quite poorly known.

== Description ==
Sphaerium nucleus is a very small bivalve which may grow up to 8mm in width and length. It differs from Sphaerium corneum only in details. Like almost all bivalves, it is a filter-feeder.

== Taxonomy ==
Sphaerium nucleus was described by Studer 1820, who placed it in the genus Cyclas. It was later thought to be a subspecies of Sphaerium corneum. Subsequently it was raised to a full species again as Sphaerium nucleus (Studer, 1820) due to its having a different form of kidney, and the shell having a broad hinge plate, dense porosity and more tumid shells with broad umbones. Unlike S. corneum it has a preference for temporary habitats.

== Distribution ==
S. nucleus occurs widely in Europe, from Spain to Ukraine. It appears to be absent from Russia.

- Austria
- Britain and Ireland (but see)
- Czech Republic – in Bohemia, in Moravia
- Germany
- Kyrgyzstan (but see)
- Slovakia
- Ukraine

== Ecology ==
This species lives in standing freshwater habitats, specifically in swampy conditions in drainage ditches and occasionally in lake margins, including temporary lakes.
