= Macrogastra borealis =

Scientific classification
- Domain: Eukaryota
- Kingdom: Animalia
- Phylum: Mollusca
- Class: Gastropoda
- Order: Stylommatophora
- Family: Clausiliidae
- Genus: Macrogastra
- Species: M. borealis

Binomial name
- Macrogastra borealis (Boettger, 1878)

Synonyms
- Clausilia latestriata var. borealis Boettger, 1878; Macrogastra borealis (Boettger, 1878); Clausilia latestriata A. Schmidt, 1857; Macrogastra latestriata (A. Schmidt, 1857)

Species of gastropod

Macrogastra borealis is a species of air-breathing land snail, a terrestrial pulmonate gastropod mollusk in the family Clausiliidae.

== Distribution ==
The native distribution of this species is Baltic and Carpathian.

It occurs in the following countries:

- Czech Republic - in Moravia only
- Latvia
- Poland
- Slovakia
- Ukraine
