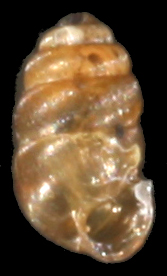
- Apertural view of a shell of Vertigo ronnebyensis

Conservation status
- Least Concern (IUCN 3.1)

Scientific classification
- Kingdom: Animalia
- Phylum: Mollusca
- Class: Gastropoda
- Order: Stylommatophora
- Family: Vertiginidae
- Subfamily: Vertigininae
- Genus: Vertigo
- Species: V. ronnebyensis

Binomial name
- Vertigo ronnebyensis (Westerlund, 1871)

Synonyms
- Pupa ronnebyensis Westerlund, 1871 (original combination); Vertigo (Boreovertigo) ronnebyensis (Westerlund, 1871) alternate representation; Vertigo (Glacivertigo) ronnebyensis (Westerlund, 1871) (unaccepted subgeneric classification); Vertigo (Vertigo) ronnebyensis (Westerlund, 1871)

= Vertigo ronnebyensis =

Species of gastropod

Vertigo ronnebyensis is a species of small air-breathing land snail, a terrestrial pulmonate gastropod mollusk in the family Vertiginidae, the whorl snails.

== Shell description ==
The shell is deeply perforate, long-ovate, regularly finely striate, very glossy and reddish-brown in color. The shell has 5½ convex whorls. The last whorl is about equal to the penult, which is a third higher than the preceding whorl, which is double the height of the next earlier. Last whorl has a transverse callus of the same color near the aperture. Suture is very oblique, ascending to the aperture.

Aperture is quite obliquely piriform, excised by the very oblique parietal wall. Aperture has 4 teeth: 1 parietal lamella, 1 conic tooth at the lower end of the sharply emerging, dark-colored columella; 2 short, widely separated, deeply immersed palatal folds. Margins are delicately united, the outer margin is weakly arcuate, nearly straight, the columellar margin is broadly reflected.

The width of the adult shell is 1.15-1.35 mm, the height is 2.0-2.35 mm.

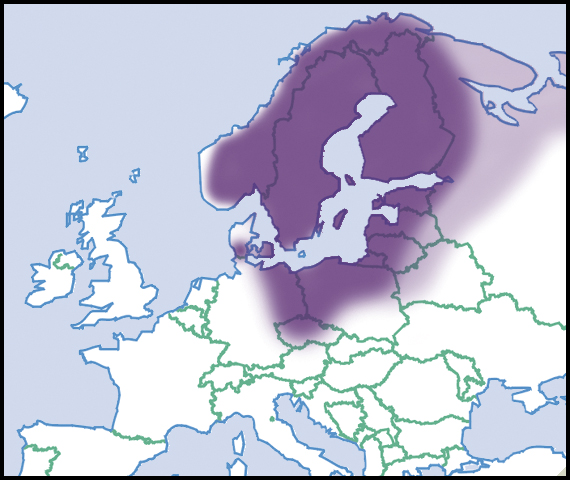
Distribution

== Distribution ==
This species occurs in:

- Fennoscandia: Sweden, Norway, Denmark, and Finland
- Baltic states: Estonia, Latvia, and Lithuania
- Northwestern Russia: Kaliningrad
- Central Europe: Germany, Czech Republic, Poland

== Habitat ==
This species lives in forests, often in association with Vaccinium and preferably on acidic soils.
