= Sphaerium ovale =

Conservation status
- Least Concern (IUCN 3.1)

Scientific classification
- Kingdom: Animalia
- Phylum: Mollusca
- Class: Bivalvia
- Order: Sphaeriida
- Family: Sphaeriidae
- Genus: Sphaerium
- Species: S. ovale

Binomial name
- Sphaerium ovale (A. Férussac, 1807)

Synonyms
- Cyclas ovalis Férussac, 1807; Nucleocylclas ovale (Férrussac, 1807); Sphaerium radiatum Westerlund, 1897

Species of bivalve

Sphaerium ovale, the oval orb mussel, is a freshwater bivalve of the family Sphaeriidae.

== Distribution and conservation status ==
- IUCN Red List – Least Concern (LC)
- Germany
