= Gyraulus riparius =

Scientific classification
- Kingdom: Animalia
- Phylum: Mollusca
- Class: Gastropoda
- Superorder: Hygrophila
- Family: Planorbidae
- Genus: Gyraulus
- Species: G. riparius

Binomial name
- Gyraulus riparius (Westerlund, 1865)

Species of gastropod

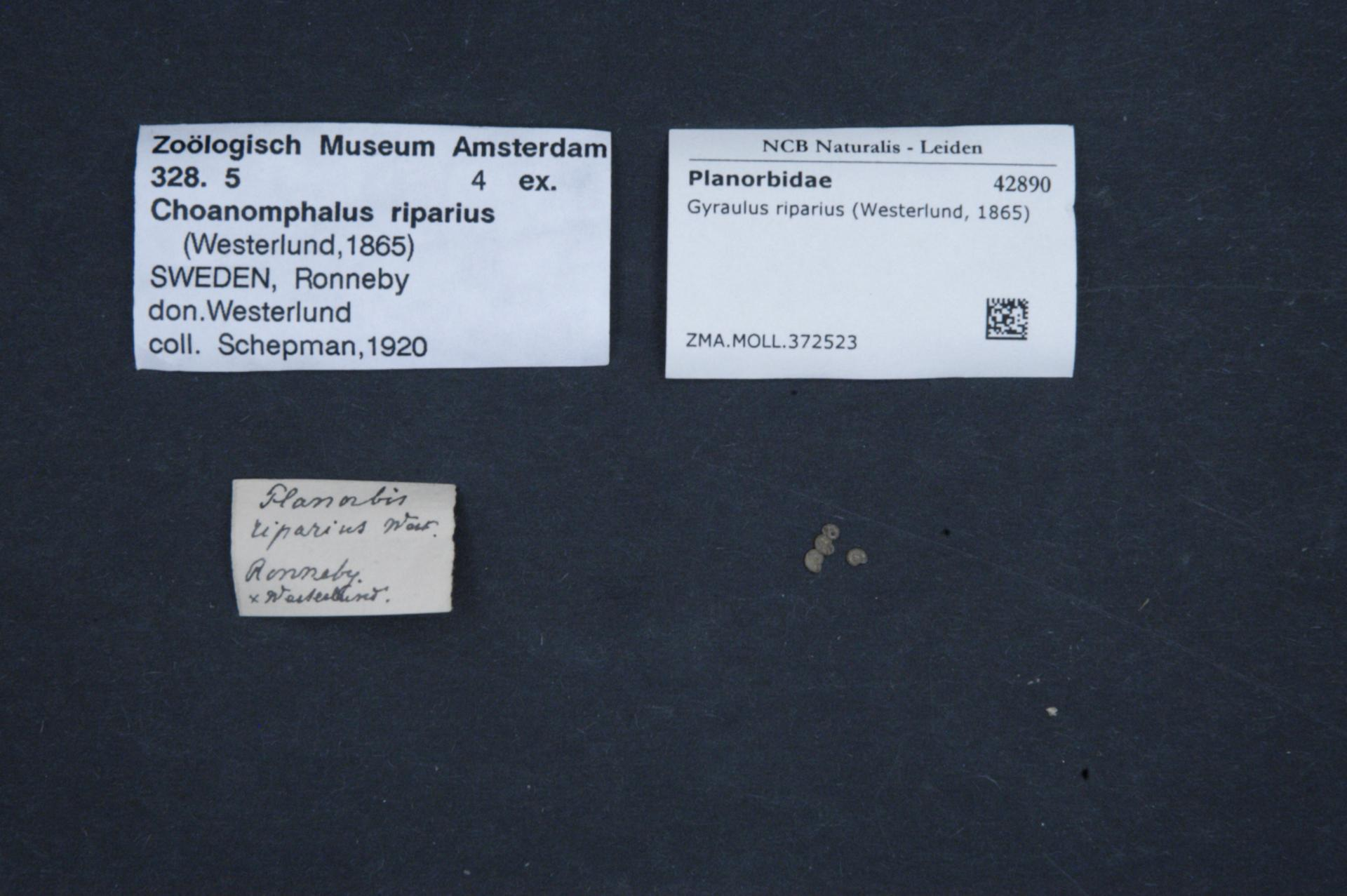
Gyraulus riparius shells (the grey dots on the lower right)

Gyraulus riparius is a species of small freshwater snail, an aquatic pulmonate gastropod mollusk in the family Planorbidae, the ram's horn snails.

== Distribution ==
The distribution of this species is Holarctic:

- Germany - critically endangered (vom Aussterben bedroht)
- Netherlands

== Habitat ==
This small snail lives on water plants in freshwater.

== Shell description ==
The shell is nearly planispiral in its coiling.
