= Sphaerium solidum =

Conservation status
- Near Threatened (IUCN 3.1)

Scientific classification
- Kingdom: Animalia
- Phylum: Mollusca
- Class: Bivalvia
- Order: Sphaeriida
- Family: Sphaeriidae
- Genus: Sphaerium
- Species: S. solidum

Binomial name
- Sphaerium solidum (Normand, 1844)
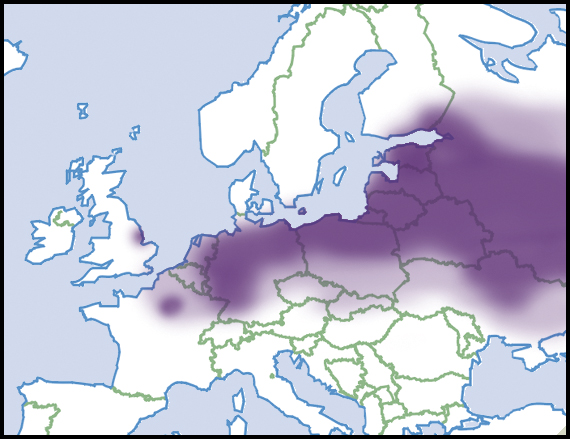
- Known range of Sphaerium solidum as of 2012

Species of mollusc

Sphaerium solidum, also known as the Witham Orb Mussel and the solid orb mussel, is a species of freshwater bivalve from the family Sphaeriidae.

The species can be found mainly in central and eastern Europe, only sporadically habitating the western part of the continent, and is present up until the Yana river Basin, in Siberia.

The easternmost representatives of the species, are frequently referred to by different species names such as Cyclas solida and Sphaerium subsolidum. However, they have since been placed in synonym with Sphaerium solidum.

Members of the species live in the coarse, sandy sediment, found in rivers, the backwaters of rivers and more rarely, lakes. They can also be found in various man-made hydrological infrastructure such as canalized rivers and deep drains.

The species' population has been declining due to various factors, foremost of which is habitat degradation caused by human activities such as water management and pollution. The viable habitats have been reported to be rapidly diminishing, due to silting and the covering of river edges as a measure against erosion. As a consequence, they have been diminishing across the European continent, being declared extinct in the Czech Republic since 1998, and being part of the UK Biodiversity Action Plan list of Priority Species since 2006.

== Conservation status ==
- Germany – critically endangered (vom Aussterben bedroht)
- Poland – endangered (EN)

== Sources ==
- Stunžėnas, Virmantas; Petkevičiūtė, Romualda; Stanevičiūtė, Gražina (2010-12-21). "Phylogeny of Sphaerium solidum (Bivalvia) based on karyotype and sequences of 16S and ITS1 rDNA". Open Life Sciences. 6 (1). Walter de Gruyter GmbH: 105–117. doi:10.2478/s11535-010-0101-6. ISSN 2391-5412.
