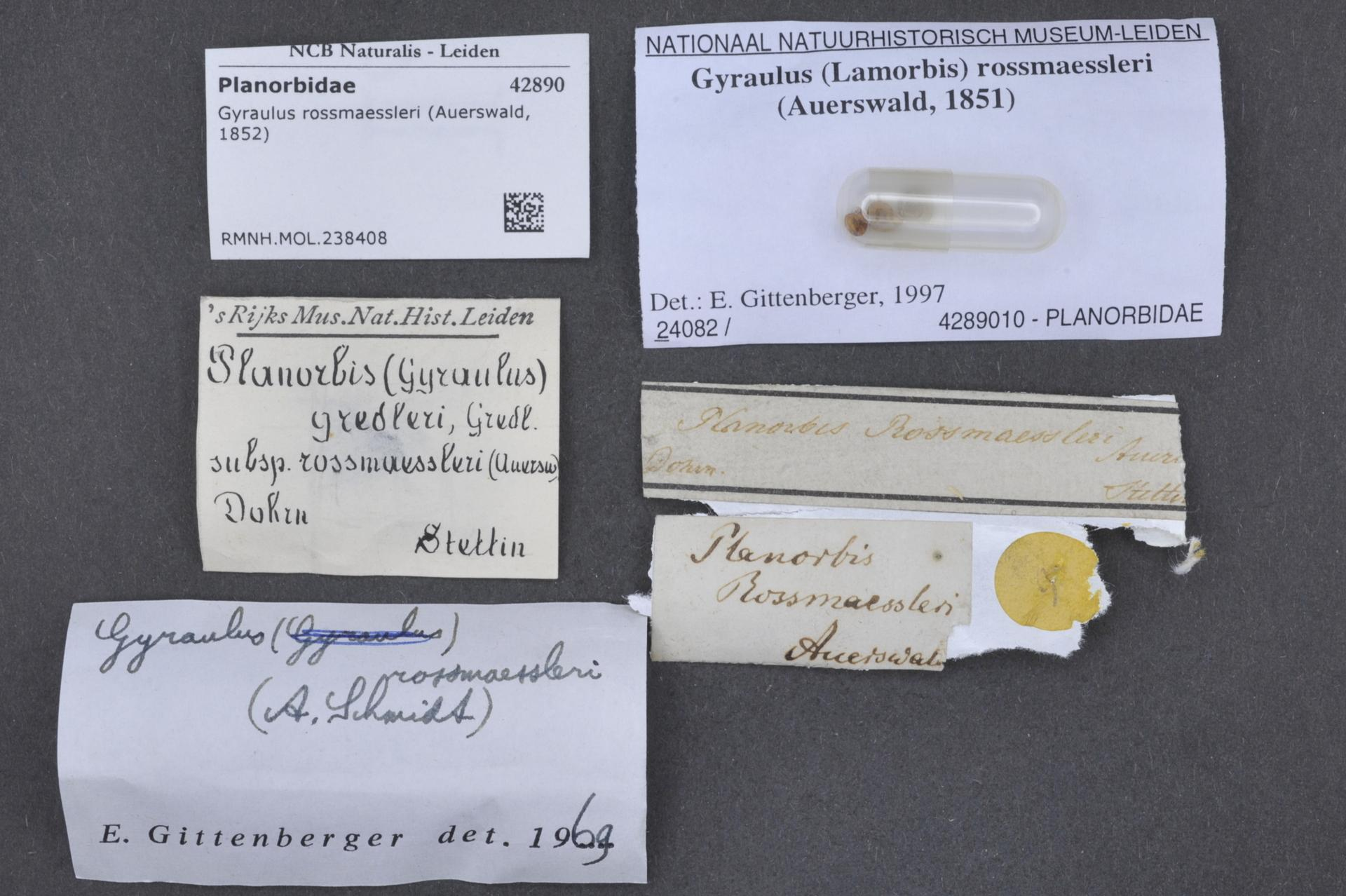
- Gyraulus rossmaessleri (Auerswald, 1852)

Scientific classification
- Kingdom: Animalia
- Phylum: Mollusca
- Class: Gastropoda
- Superorder: Hygrophila
- Family: Planorbidae
- Genus: Gyraulus
- Species: G. rossmaessleri

Binomial name
- Gyraulus rossmaessleri (Auerswald, 1852)

= Gyraulus rossmaessleri =

Species of gastropod

Gyraulus rossmaessleri is a small species of freshwater snail, an aquatic pulmonate gastropod mollusk in the family Planorbidae, the ram's horn snails.

== Distribution ==
The distribution of this species is Holarctic. It occurs in countries and islands including:

- Germany - critically endangered (vom Aussterben bedroht)

== Habitat ==
This small snail lives on water plants in freshwater.

== Shell description ==
The shell is nearly planispiral in its coiling.
