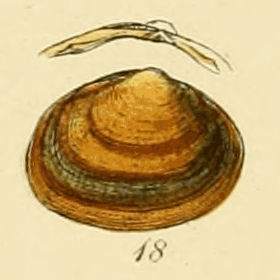

Conservation status
- Vulnerable (IUCN 3.1)

Scientific classification
- Kingdom: Animalia
- Phylum: Mollusca
- Class: Bivalvia
- Order: Sphaeriida
- Family: Sphaeriidae
- Genus: Sphaerium
- Species: S. rivicola

Binomial name
- Sphaerium rivicola (Lamarck, 1818)

= Sphaerium rivicola =

Species of bivalve

Sphaerium rivicola, the river orb mussel, is a species of freshwater bivalve from family Sphaeriidae.

== Distribution ==
Its native distribution is European.

- Czech Republic – in Bohemia, in Moravia, endangered
- Germany – highly endangered (Stark gefährdet)
