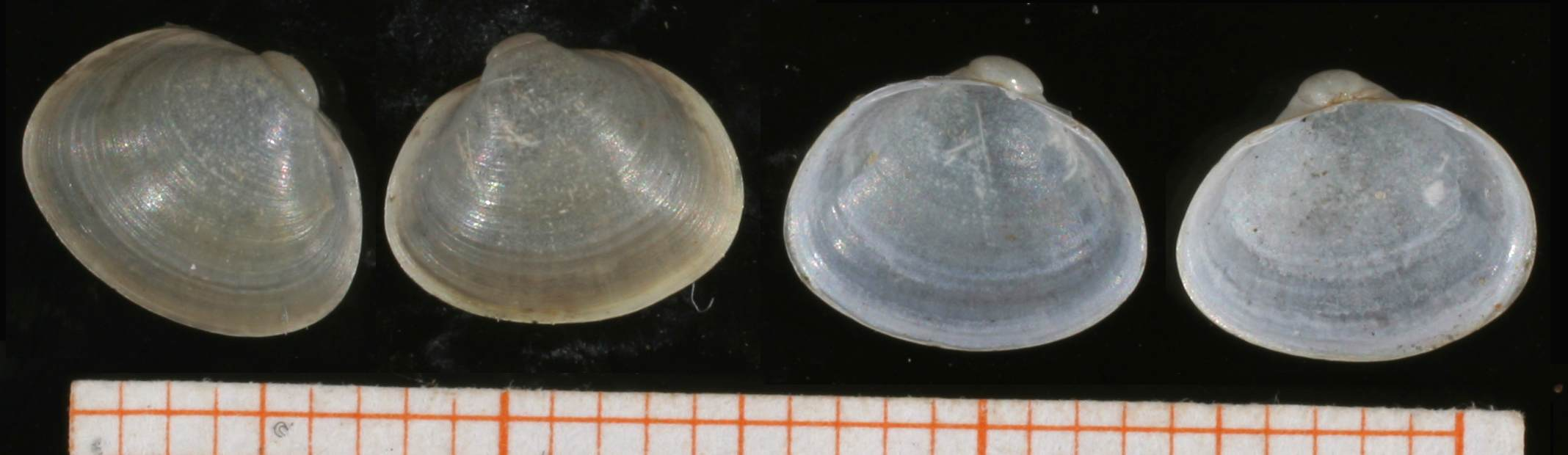

Conservation status
- Least Concern (IUCN 3.1)

- Secure (NatureServe)

Scientific classification
- Kingdom: Animalia
- Phylum: Mollusca
- Class: Bivalvia
- Order: Sphaeriida
- Family: Sphaeriidae
- Genus: Sphaerium
- Species: S. lacustre

Binomial name
- Sphaerium lacustre (O. F. Müller, 1774)

Synonyms
- List: Calyculina clessini Clessin, 1882; Calyculina deformis (H. F. Carpenter, 1902); Calyculina hungarica Hazay, 1880; Calyculina jayensis (Prime, 1852); Calyculina lacustris (O. F. Müller, 1774); Calyculina lacustris var. septentrionalis Clessin, 1876; Calyculina raymondi J. G. Cooper, 1892; Calyculina rosacea (Prime, 1852); Calyculina ryckholti (Normand, 1844); Calyculina rykholtii Clessin, 1879; Calyculina rykholtii var. gallica Clessin, 1879; Cyclas (Securilla) lacustris (O. F. Müller, 1774); Cyclas calyculata Draparnaud, 1805; Cyclas calyculata var. compressa Middendorff, 1851; Cyclas creplini Dunker, 1845; Cyclas jayensis Prime, 1852; Cyclas rosacea Prime, 1852; Cyclas ryckholti Normand, 1844; Cyclas ryckholti var. mucronulata Moquin-Tandon, 1856; Cyclas steinii A. Schmidt, 1850; Cyclas strictum Normand, 1854; Cyclas terveriana Dupuy, 1849; Musculium (Musculium) clessini (Paulucci, 1882); Musculium (Musculium) compressum (Middendorff, 1851); Musculium (Musculium) creplini (Dunker, 1845); Musculium (Musculium) hungaricum (Hazay, 1880); Musculium (Musculium) lacustre (O. F. Müller, 1774); Musculium (Musculium) mucronulatum (Moquin-Tandon, 1856); Musculium (Musculium) ryckholti (Normand, 1844); Musculium (Musculium) steinii (A. Schmidt, 1850); Musculium (Musculium) strictum (Normand, 1854); Musculium (Musculium) terverianum (Dupuy, 1849); Musculium clessini (Paulucci, 1882); Musculium compressum (Middendorff, 1851); Musculium creplini (Dunker, 1845); Musculium declive Sterki, 1912; Musculium hungaricum (Hazay, 1880); Musculium lacustre (O. F. Müller, 1774); Musculium mucronulatum (Moquin-Tandon, 1856); Musculium pusillum Sterki, 1910; Musculium rosaceum (Prime, 1852); Musculium rosaceum var. fuliginosum Sterki, 1916; Musculium ryckholti (Normand, 1844); Musculium strictum (Normand, 1854); Musculium terverianum (Dupuy, 1849); Musculium winkleyi Sterki, 1909; Sphaerium (Musculium) lacustre (O. F. Müller, 1774); Sphaerium deformis H. F. Carpenter, 1902; Sphaerium hispanicum Bourguignat, 1870; Sphaerium lenticula Prime, 1862; Sphaerium maroccanum Pallary, 1899; Sphaerium raymondi J. G. Cooper, 1892; Tellina lacustris O. F. Müller, 1774; Tellina stagnicola Sheppard, 1825; Tellina tuberculata Alten, 1812

= Sphaerium lacustre =

Species of mollusc

Sphaerium lacustre, also known as lake fingernail clam, is species of small freshwater clam, an aquatic bivalve mollusc in the family Sphaeriidae, the fingernail clams and pea clams.

== Description ==
The 8–11 mm. shell is oval to quadrangular in shape. The umbos which are capped by the juvenile shell are slightly in front of middle directed forwards. The posterior end is broad and truncated. The shell is fragile, fairly glossy and pearl grey to white in colour. The periostracum (surface) is ornamented with fine, even, concentric striation.

== Distribution ==
The native distribution of this species is Holarctic and occurs in islands and countries including:

- Algeria
- Belgium
- Czech Republic – in Bohemia, in Moravia, near threatened (NT)
- Slovakia
- Germany – (Arten der Vorwarnliste)
- Great Britain
- Ireland
- Nordic countries: Denmark, Finland, Sweden (but not in Faroes nor in Iceland)
