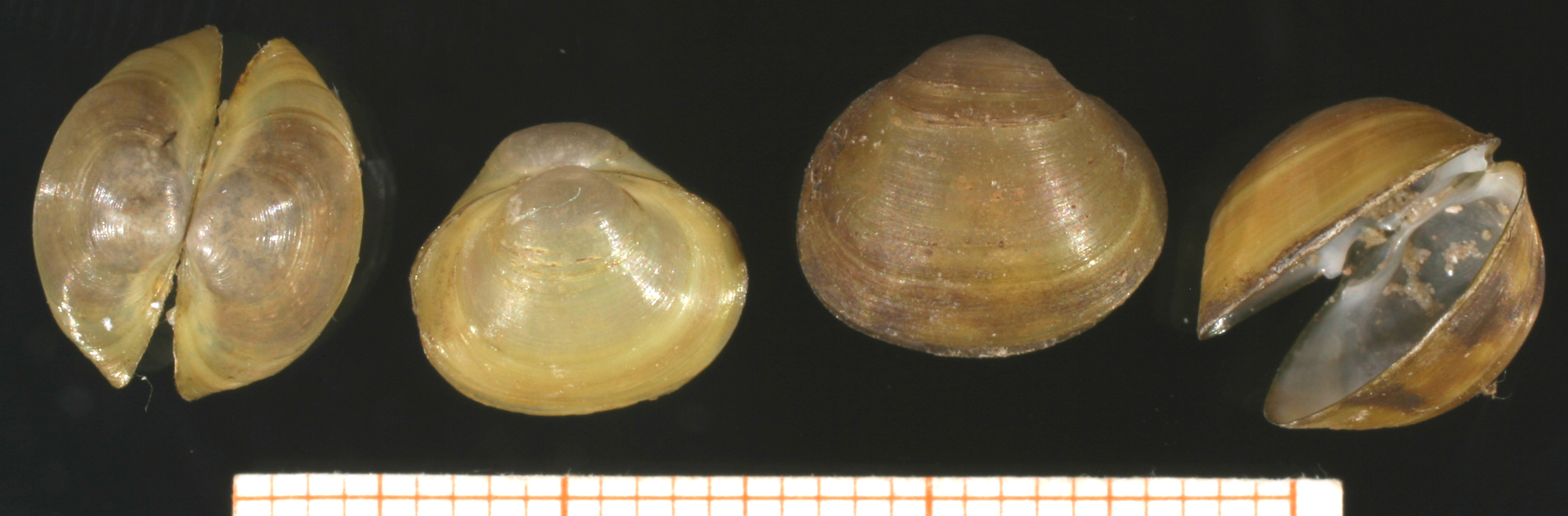

Conservation status
- Least Concern (IUCN 3.1)

- Secure (NatureServe)

Scientific classification
- Kingdom: Animalia
- Phylum: Mollusca
- Class: Bivalvia
- Order: Sphaeriida
- Superfamily: Sphaerioidea
- Family: Sphaeriidae
- Genus: Sphaerium
- Species: S. corneum

Binomial name
- Sphaerium corneum (Linnaeus, 1758)

= Sphaerium corneum =

Species of bivalve

Sphaerium corneum, also known as the horny orb mussel or European fingernail clam, is a very small freshwater clam, an aquatic bivalve mollusk in the family Sphaeriidae, the fingernail clams.

== Description ==
The shell is fairly globular and can grow up to 9–13.5 millimetres (0.35–0.53 in) in size. The color of the shell is usually a brown to gray with the juveniles being a yellow color. Their shells exhibit striae, thin parallel rows of elevated lines.

Right and left valve of the same specimen:

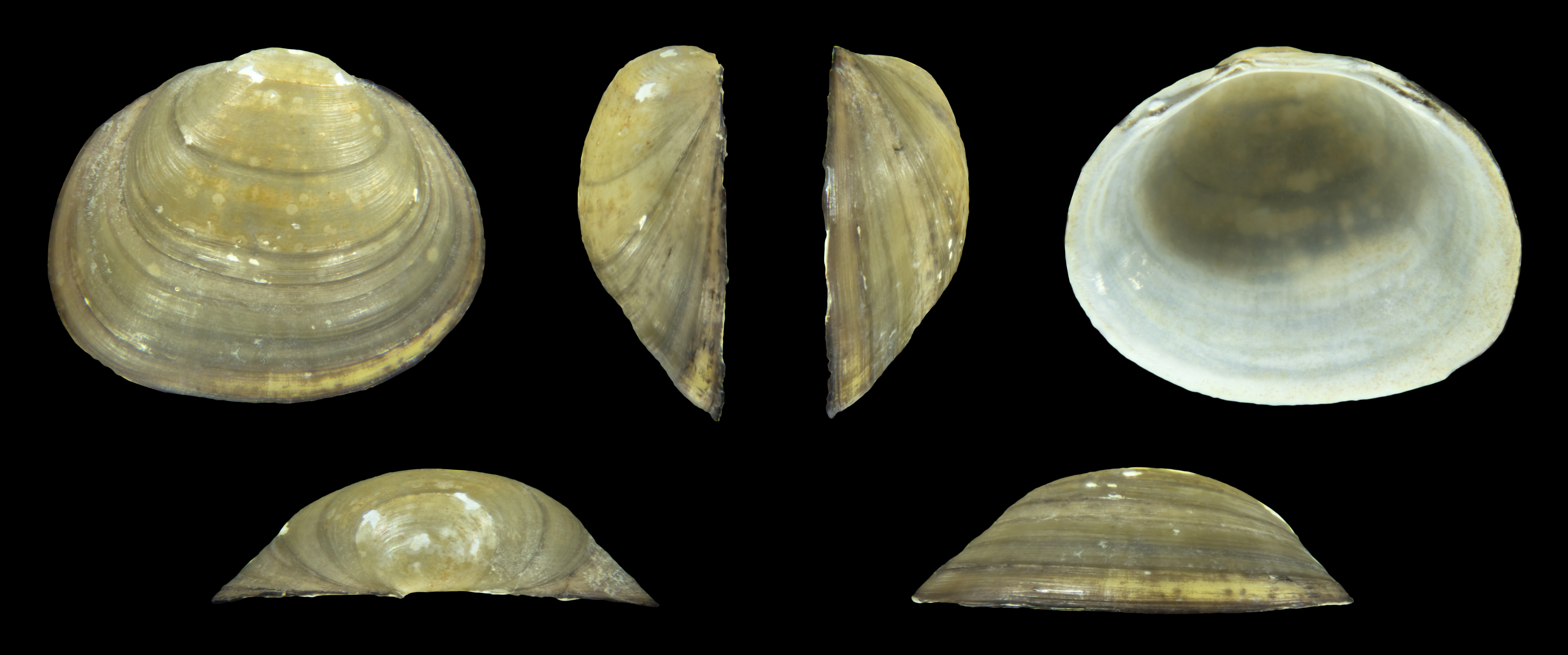
Right valve

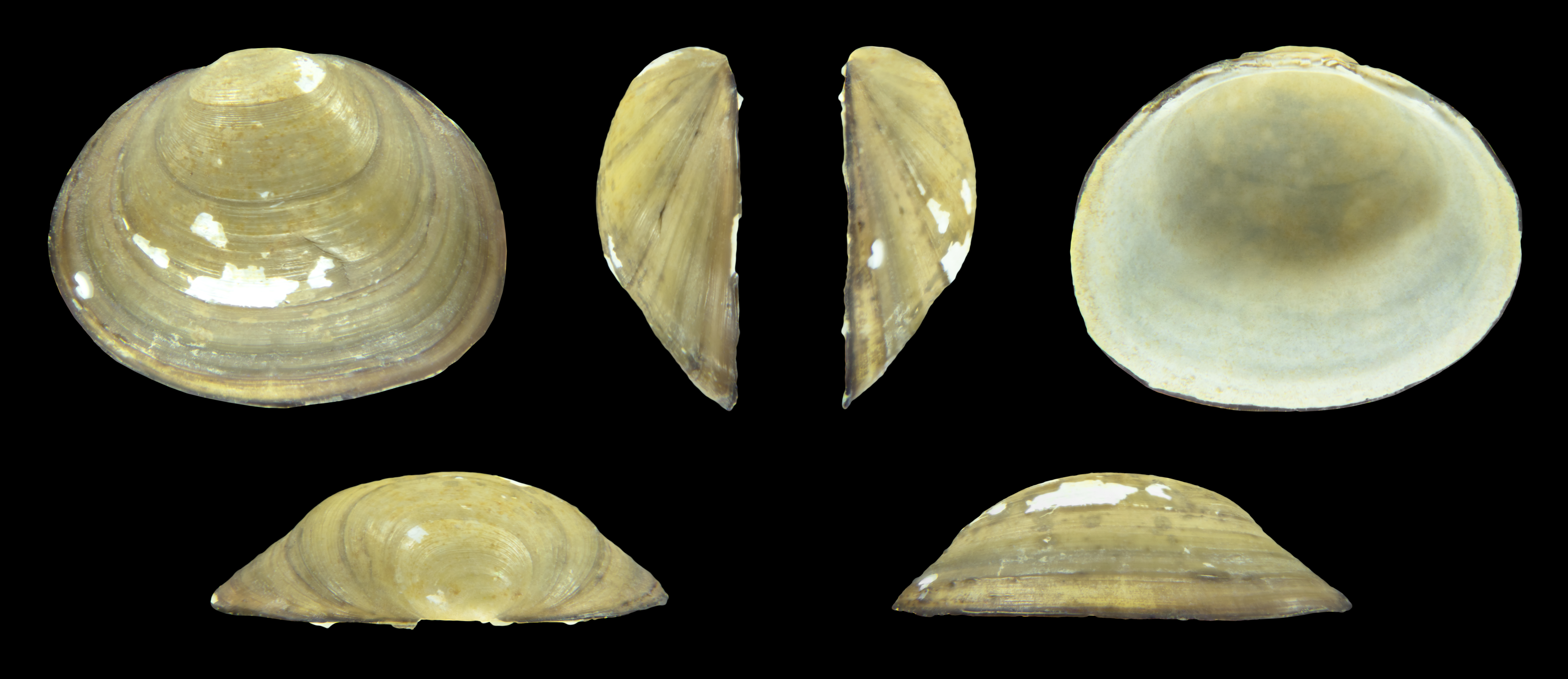
Left valve

== Ecology ==
These small clams are found in shallow, freshwater habitats with slow moving waters, including freshwater lakes, rivers and creeks. As with most bivalves, Sphaerium corneum is mainly a filter feeder and thus prefers more eutrophic waters that provide a greater food source. These clams have exhibited a unique ability to climb up plants and structures around their habitat to find better locations for feeding. They also are known to deposit feed in times of low current or food availability. This species has shown a preference however for slow currents in their habitats (Lotic ecosystem), which will provide a constant supply of food. Their primary food sources are diatoms and other phytoplankton.

S. corneum are sensitive to high pollution levels, particularly organic pollutants which foul the water, preventing the clams from effective feeding. As such, they are a bioindicator species whose presence may demonstrate that the water is relatively unpolluted. They are tolerant of anoxic locations however and can survive up to 400 days at 0 °C (32 °F) and 9 days at 20 °C (68 °F) without oxygen. This allows them to burrow down into sand, mud, gravel and other inorganic substrates where oxygen levels are low to avoid predation and to explore other food sources. Their anoxic tolerance also allows them to survive at times where low water levels lead to a quick depletion of oxygen, but as they are sensitive to desiccation, or drying out, they cannot survive for extended periods without water.

These clams can live up to three years, although geographic location greatly influences their survival rates. In their native habitats, they may reach their full lifespan, although in the United States and other non-native areas the clams average only 1 to 1 1/2 years. They are considered mature once they reach 4 millimetres (0.16 in). This can be as early as three months in their native habitat.

== Distribution ==
The native distribution of this species is Palearctic.

- Czech Republic – in Bohemia, in Moravia, least concern (LC)
- Finland – throughout the country
- Germany – a common species in most of Germany, but it is in listed as endangered (German: gefährdet) in Thuringia
- Netherlands
- Norway – lowland areas
- Sweden – throughout the country
- United States – nonindigenous
- and many other countries

According to Kuiper et al., the species does not occur in the Faroes nor in Iceland.

In freshwater: standing water and slow-running rivers.
