= Sphaeriida =

Scientific classification
- Domain: Eukaryota
- Kingdom: Animalia
- Phylum: Mollusca
- Class: Bivalvia
- Superorder: Imparidentia
- Order: Sphaeriida

Order of bivalves

Sphaeriida is an order of bivalves belonging to the class Bivalvia.

Families:

- Neomiodontidae
- Sphaeriidae
