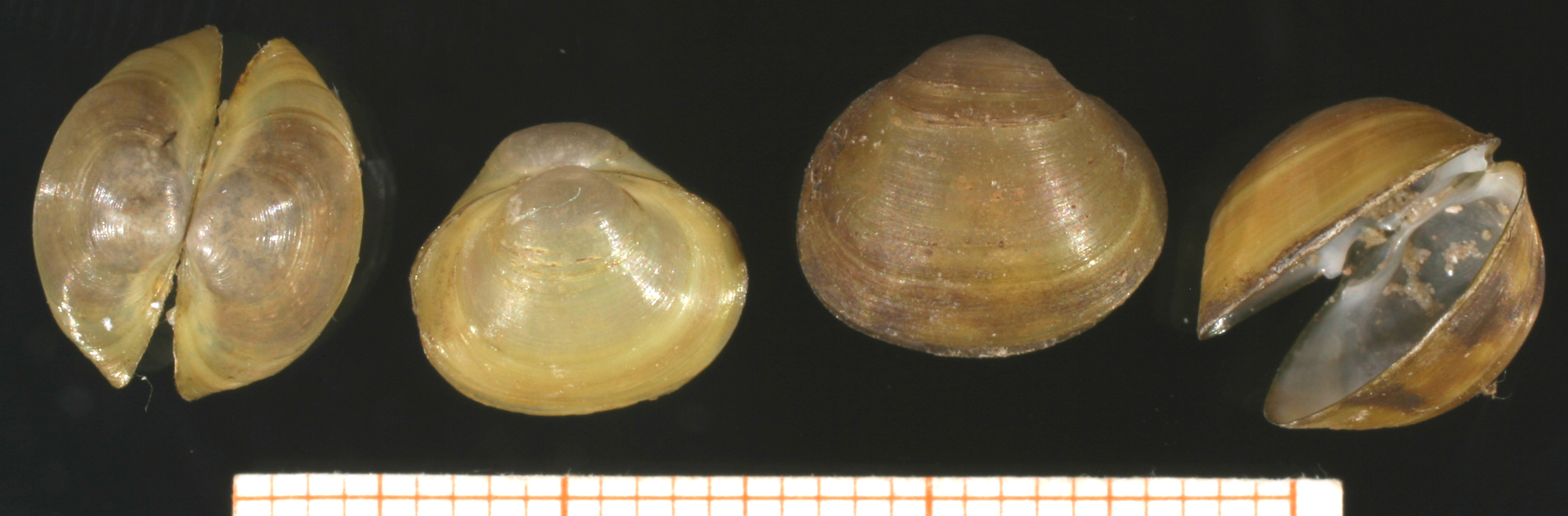
- Four shells of Sphaerium corneum. Scale bar is in mm.

Scientific classification
- Kingdom: Animalia
- Phylum: Mollusca
- Class: Bivalvia
- Order: Sphaeriida
- Superfamily: Sphaerioidea
- Family: Sphaeriidae; Deshayes, 1855 (1820)

Genera
- See text

Synonyms
- Cycladidae, Rafinesque 1820

= Sphaeriidae =

Family of bivalves

Sphaeriidae is a family of small to minute freshwater bivalve molluscs in the order Sphaeriida. In the US, they are commonly known as pea clams or fingernail clams.

== Genera ==
Genera:

- Euperinae
  - Byssanodonta d'Orbigny, 1846
  - Eupera Bourguignat, 1854
- Sphaeriinae
  - Afropisidium Kuiper, 1962
  - Euglesa Jenyns, 1832
  - Musculium Link, 1807
  - Odhneripisidium Kuiper, 1962
  - Pisidium C. Pfeiffer, 1821
  - Sphaerium Scopoli, 1777
- fossils
  - †Megasphaerioides Komatsu, J.-H. Chen & Q.-F. Wang, 2003
  - †Protosphaerium Hocknull, 2000
  - †Sphaericoncha Kolesnikov, 1980

== Biology and ecology ==
Sphaeriidae are hermaphrodites with internal fertilization. Developing young are incubated within their mother (ovoviviparity), and newborn clams look like miniature copies of the adults.

Parasites and/or predators include the Sciomyzidae.
