= Valvata pulchella =

Valvata pulchella may refer to:

- Valvata pulchella Studer, 1820 is a synonym of Valvata macrostoma (Mörch, 1864)
- Valvata pulchella Studer, 1789 is a synonym of Valvata piscinalis (O. F. Müller, 1774)
- Valvata pulchella Studer, 1820 is a synonym of Valvata studeri Boeters & Falkner, 1998
