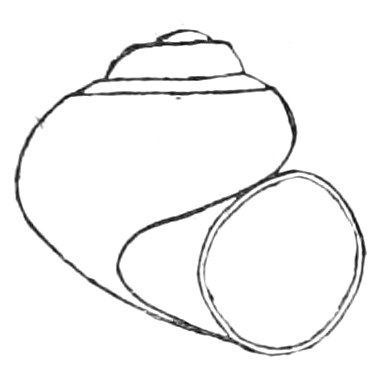
- Drawing of apertural view of the shell of Valvata utahensis

Conservation status
- Vulnerable (IUCN 3.1)

- Imperiled (NatureServe)

Scientific classification
- Kingdom: Animalia
- Phylum: Mollusca
- Class: Gastropoda
- Family: Valvatidae
- Genus: Valvata
- Species: V. utahensis

Binomial name
- Valvata utahensis (Call, 1884)

Synonyms
- Valvata sincera var. utahensis Call, 1884; Valvata utahensis f. horatii Baily & Baily, 1951; Valvata utahensis horatii Baily & Baily, 1951

= Utah roundmouth snail =

Utah roundmouth snail Temporal range: Pleistocene–Recent

Species of gastropod

The Utah roundmouth snail, also known as the Utah valvata or desert valvata, scientific name Valvata utahensis, is a species of freshwater snail with a gill and an operculum, an aquatic gastropod mollusc in the family Valvatidae, the valve snails.

This species of snail is endemic to the United States. The common name refers to the State of Utah.

== Taxonomy ==
This species was first described as Valvata sincera var. utahensis by Richard Ellsworth Call (1856-1917, U.S.A.) in 1884 from specimens collected at Utah Lake, Utah (the type locality).

R. E. Call elevated Valvata utahensis to species level in 1886 and this was confirmed also in revision of the genus by Bryant Walker (1856-1936, U.S.A.) in 1902.

There was established a subspecies Valvata utahensis horatii Baily & Baily, 1951 from pleistocene, but Taylor (1966) stated, that Valvata utahensis horatii should be a synonym for Valvata utahensis.

== Shell description ==
The shell of the Utah valvata snail is 4.5 mm high, and 4.5 mm width. The average size of adult Utah valvata snails is 4.32 mm.

The shell is turbinate in shape, thin, translucent and shining. It is a yellowish horn color at the apex, white or greenish white below the apex. The shell has four whorls which are convex, regularly increasing, minutely striate, the uppermost shouldered, with a single, well-marked carina which becomes obsolete on the body whorl. Turbinate shell form and an incipient carina (keel-shaped ridge) on the dorsal surface of the shell distinguishes Valvata utahensis from the morphologically similar Valvata humeralis.

The spire of the shell is obtusely elevated, and the apex is depressed. The suture is well impressed. The aperture of the shell is circular and slightly angled posteriorly. The lip of the aperture is simple, nearly continuous, and it is appressed to the body whorl.

The umbilicus is small and round; it is defined by a more or less obvious angle around the base of the shell.

The color of the operculum is light horn. The operculum is corneus, spirally multivolute, slightly produced posteriorly to conform to the shape of the aperture.

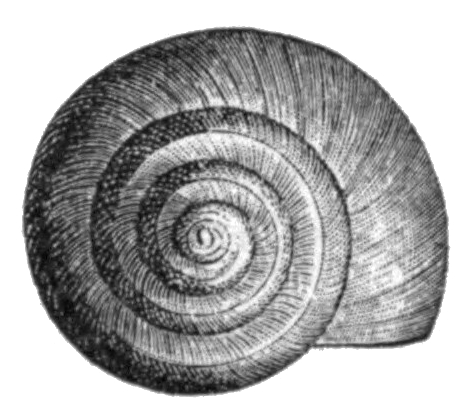
Drawing of the apical view.

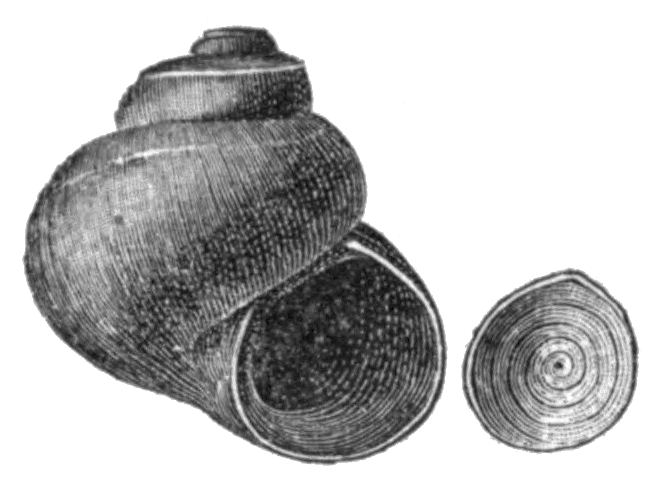
Drawing of the apertural view (operculum detailed).

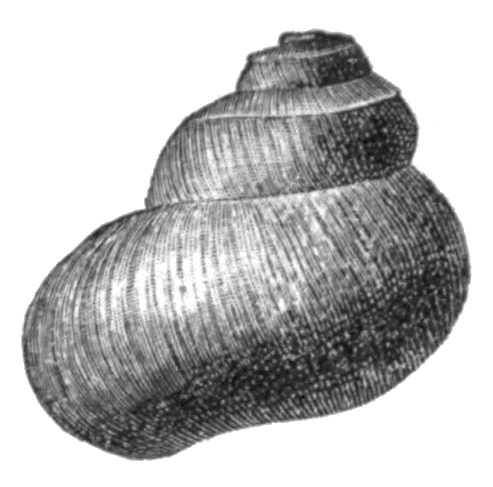
Drawing of the lateral view.

== Distribution ==
=== Fossil distribution ===
The Utah valvata snail, or at least its closely related ancestors, has been described as ranging widely across the western United States and Canada as far back as the Jurassic Period, 199.6 ± 0.6 to 145.5 ± 4 million years ago.

Fossils of the Utah valvata snail are known from Utah to California. The Utah valvata snail was likely present in the ancestral Snake River as it flowed south from Idaho, through Nevada, and into northeastern California. The Snake River escaped to join the Columbia River Basin approximately 2 million years ago.

Historically, Valvata utahensis occurred in Utah Lake of Utah and in the Snake River of southern Idaho.

This snail is endemic to the Pliocene of the Lake Idaho region.

=== Recent distribution ===
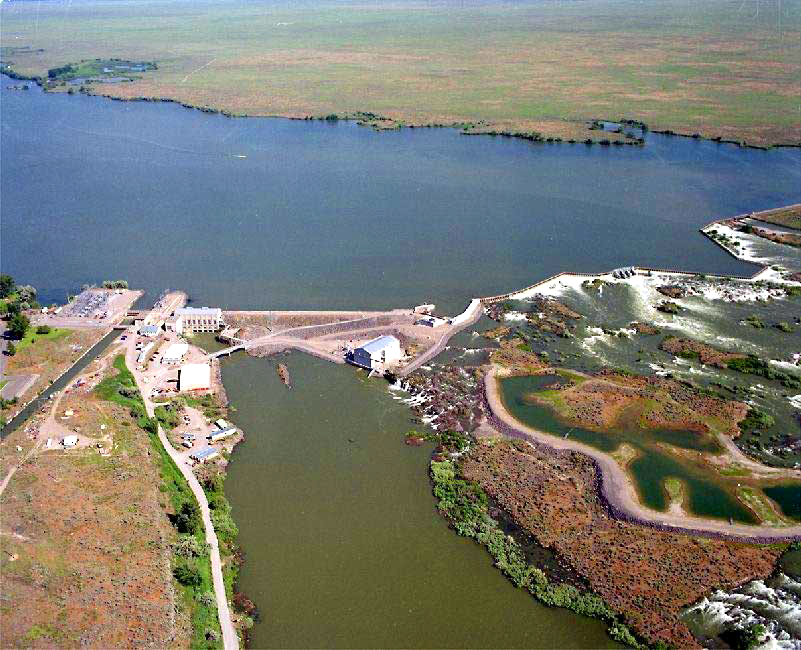
The area around Minidoka Dam on the Snake River in Idaho is one of three recent localities where Valvata utahensis can be found.

The modern range of the snail extended as far downstream as Grandview (rkm 783, rm 487). However, recent mollusc surveys throughout Utah revealed no live snails, and the species is believed to be extirpated there.

At present, this species occurs in a few springs and mainstem Snake River sites in the Hagerman Valley (rkm 932, rm 579). Additional locations include a few sites immediately upstream and downstream of the Minidoka Dam (rkm 1,086, rm 675), near the Eagle Rock dam site (rkm 1,142, rm 709) and below the American Falls Dam downstream to Burley.

Recent surveys at The Nature Conservancy's "Thousand Springs Preserve" revealed declines in numbers and range of the Utah valvata over a four-year period. In 1991, colonies of this snail persisted in only two areas at the Thousand Springs Preserve, with a population estimate for each colony at or below 6,000 individuals. The population density varied, but it averaged six individuals per meter^{2} (2.69 ft^{2}).

For new localities see Federal Register, July 16, 2009.

== Ecology ==
=== Habitat ===
The Utah valvata snail persists in a variety of aquatic habitats, including cold-water springs, spring creeks and tributaries, the mainstem Snake River and associated tributary stream habitats, and reservoirs.

It was thought that the snail is specialized on well-oxygenated areas of limestone, mud, or mud-sand substrate, among stream beds with submergent aquatic vegetation. It was thought to be absent from pure gravel-boulder substrate. Chara, a rooted aquatic plant that concentrates both calcium carbonate (CaCO_{3}) and silicon dioxide (SiO_{2}), is a common associate of Valvata utahensis. However the species occurs on a variety of substrate types including both fine sediments and more coarse substrates in areas both with and without macrophytes.

The species has been collected at a wide range of depths, ranging from less than 1 m to depths greater than 14 m, and at temperatures between 4 and 24 °C (39 and 75 °F).

Recent work conducted by the Idaho Department of Fish and Game (IDFG) in the upper Snake River demonstrated that Utah valvata snail presence was positively correlated with water depth up to 5.5 m (up to 18.37 feet) and temperature up to 17.2 °C (up to 63 °F), and Utah valvata snail density was positively correlated with macrophyte (a water plant large enough to be observed with the unaided eye) coverage, water depth, and temperature.

Similarly, Hinson (2006) analyzed available data from several studies conducted by the USBR (2001-2004), Idaho Power Company (IPC) (1995-2002), IDFG, Idaho Transportation Department (2003-2004) and others, and demonstrated a positive relationship between Utah valvata snail presence and macrophytes, depth, and fine substrates. One study reported Utah valvata snails in organically enriched fine sediments with a heavy macrophyte community, downstream of an aquaculture facility (rm 588).

Survey data and information reported since the time of listing demonstrate that the Utah valvata snail is able to live in reservoirs, which were previously thought to be unsuitable for the species.

=== Feeding habits ===
Valvata utahensis is primarily a detritivore, grazing along the mud surface ingesting diatoms or small plant debris. In habitats with boulders on mud, the snail has been observed grazing diatoms and other periphyton (sessile organisms that live attached to rocky surfaces) and aquatic plants.

=== Life cycle ===
Utah roundmouth snail is a hermaphroditic snail.

The Utah valvata snail is univoltine (produces one group of eggs per year) with a lifespan of about 1 year. Reproduction and spawning occur asynchronously between March and October, depending on habitat, with the majority of young spawned between August and October.

Emergence of a new cohort follows approximately 2 weeks after oviposition, and senescent snails (i.e., those approximately 374 days old) die shortly after reproduction.

The Utah valvata snail has been observed to produce egg masses which contained 3 to 12 developing snails. Egg masses are approximately 1.0 to 1.5 mm in diameter, and young snails are approximately 0.7 mm in size upon emergence.

=== Interspecific relationships ===
The occurrence of trematode parasites in the Utah valvata has not been studied.

Predators of the Utah valvata snail have not been documented; however, it is assumed that some predation by native and non-native species occurs.

== Conservation ==
This species was listed as endangered on the United States Fish and Wildlife Service list of endangered species on December 14, 1992.

On July 17, 2009, the Fish and Wildlife Service published a proposal in the Federal Register to remove the species from the list of endangered species stating that the Service now knows that the Utah valvata snail is not limited to areas of cold-water springs or spring outflows; rather, it persists in a variety of aquatic habitats, including cold-water springs, spring creeks and tributaries, the mainstream Snake River and associated tributary stream habitats, and reservoirs influenced by dam operations. The snail was delisted in 2010.

Valvata utahensis is listed as Vulnerable species in the 2011 IUCN Red List of Threatened Species.
