= Borysthenia goldfussiana =

Scientific classification
- Kingdom: Animalia
- Phylum: Mollusca
- Class: Gastropoda
- Family: Valvatidae
- Genus: Borysthenia
- Species: B. goldfussiana

Binomial name
- Borysthenia goldfussiana (Wüst, 1901)

Extinct species of gastropod

†Borysthenia goldfussiana is an extinct species of small freshwater snail with a gill and an operculum, an aquatic gastropod mollusk in the family Valvatidae, the valve snails.
