= Valvata salebrosa =

Valvata salebrosa Temporal range: Early Pleistocene

Scientific classification
- Kingdom: Animalia
- Phylum: Mollusca
- Class: Gastropoda
- Family: Valvatidae
- Genus: Valvata
- Species: †V. salebrosa

Binomial name
- †Valvata salebrosa Meijer, 1990

Extinct species of gastropod

Valvata (Tropidina) salebrosa is an extinct species of small freshwater snail in the family Valvatidae, the valve snails. This species is known only from fossil material.

Fossils of this species are known from Lower Pleistocene deposits in the Netherlands. It was first described from fluvial and lacustrine sediments by T. Meijer in 1990.
