= Valvata saulcyi =

Conservation status
- Least Concern (IUCN 3.1)

Scientific classification
- Kingdom: Animalia
- Phylum: Mollusca
- Class: Gastropoda
- Family: Valvatidae
- Genus: Valvata
- Species: V. saulcyi

Binomial name
- Valvata saulcyi Bourguignat, 1853

Species of gastropod

Valvata saulcyi is a species of gastropods belonging to the family Valvatidae. It is found in freshwater habitats of the Levant and Sicily.

The IUCN rates the conservation status of this species as least concern.
