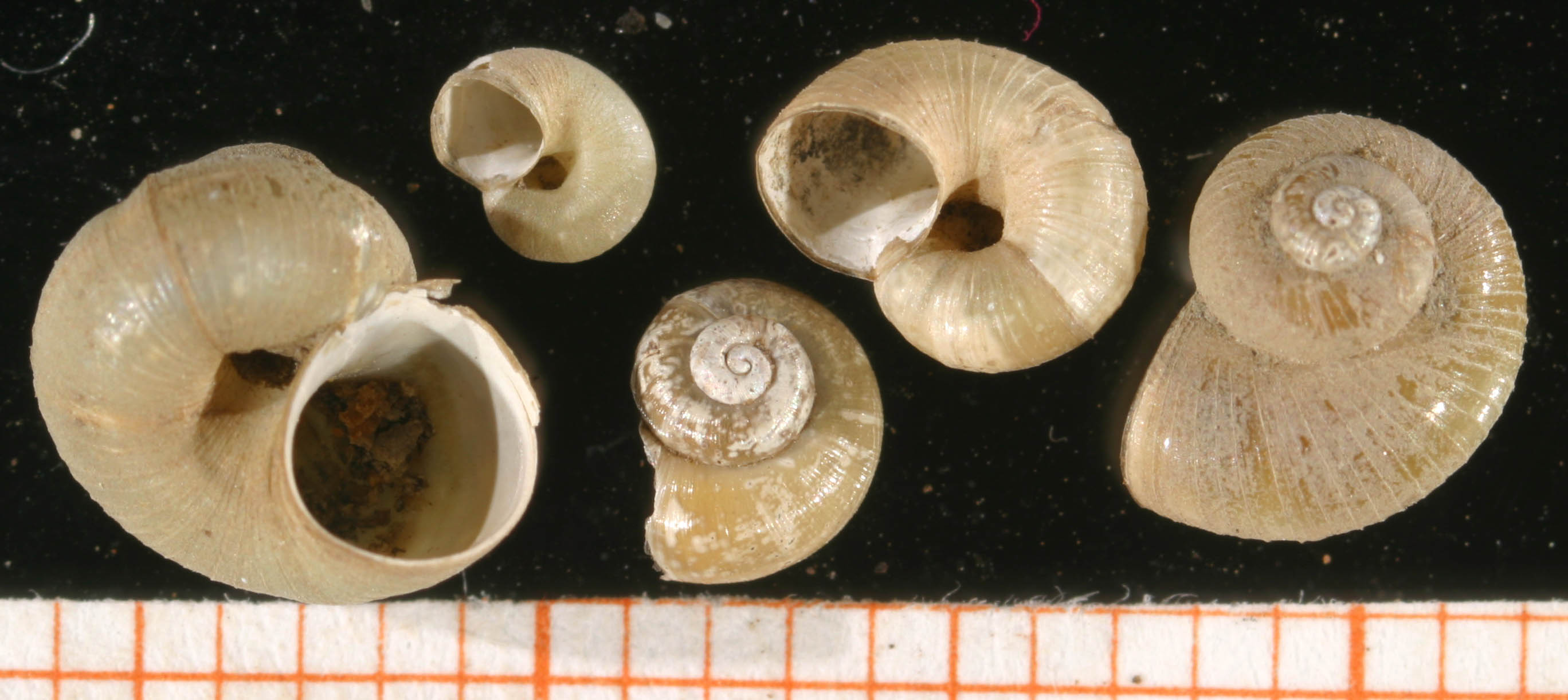
- Five shells of Valvata aliena

Scientific classification
- Kingdom: Animalia
- Phylum: Mollusca
- Class: Gastropoda
- Family: Valvatidae
- Genus: Valvata
- Species: V. aliena

Binomial name
- Valvata aliena Westerlund, 1877

= Valvata aliena =

Species of gastropod

Valvata aliena is a species of minute freshwater snail with an operculum, an aquatic gastropod mollusk in the family Valvatidae, the valve snails.

== Distribution ==
This species lives in Siberia.
