= Valvata relicta =

Scientific classification
- Kingdom: Animalia
- Phylum: Mollusca
- Class: Gastropoda
- Family: Valvatidae
- Genus: Valvata
- Species: †V. relicta

Binomial name
- †Valvata relicta Poliński, 1929

Extinct species of gastropod

†Valvata (Ohridotropidina) relicta is an extinct species of small freshwater snail in the family Valvatidae, the valve snails. This species is known only from fossil material.

== Distribution and fossil record ==
Fossils of †Valvata relicta have been recorded from the ancient Lake Ohrid basin in the Balkans, where a number of endemic mollusks were described in the early 20th century. The species was originally described by J. Poliński in 1929. Fossil and subfossil records indicate its presence in Pleistocene lacustrine sediments of the Lake Ohrid region.
