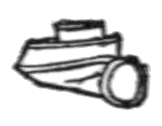
- Drawing: apertural view of shell of Valvata tricarinata

Conservation status
- Least Concern (IUCN 3.1)

- Secure (NatureServe)

Scientific classification
- Kingdom: Animalia
- Phylum: Mollusca
- Class: Gastropoda
- Family: Valvatidae
- Genus: Valvata
- Species: V. tricarinata

Binomial name
- Valvata tricarinata (Say, 1817)

Synonyms
- Cyclostoma tricarinata Say, 1817; Valvata carinata Sowerby I, 1834; Valvata simplex Gould, 1841; Valvata tricarinata perconfusa Walker, 1917; Valvata tricarinata unicarinata De Kay, 1843; Valvata tricarinata var. bakeri Fluck, 1932; Valvata tricarinata var. basalis Vanatta 1915; Valvata tricarinata var. confusa Walker, 1902; Valvata tricarinata var. infracarinata Vanatta, 1915; Valvata tricarinata var. mediocarinata Baker, 1928; Valvata tricarinata var. mediocarinta Baker, 1928; Valvata tricarinata var. perconfusa Walker, 1917; Valvata tricarinata var. simplex Gould, 1841; Valvata tricarinata var. supracarinata Baker, 1921; Valvata tricarinata var. unicarinata De Kay, 1843; Valvata unicarinata De Kay, 1843

= Valvata tricarinata =

Species of gastropod

Valvata tricarinata, common name the three-ridge valvata or threeridge valvata, is a species of small freshwater snail with a gill and an operculum, an aquatic gastropod mollusk in the family Valvatidae, the valve snails.

== Distribution ==
This species occurs in North America.

== Shell description ==
There is great variation in the degree of carination of the shell.

== Paleontology ==
Valvata tricarinata is abundant in nearly all lacustrine and fluviatile deposits in North America of the Pleistocene period. The fossil shells are more variable than the Recent ones. Eight forms or subspecies were described.
