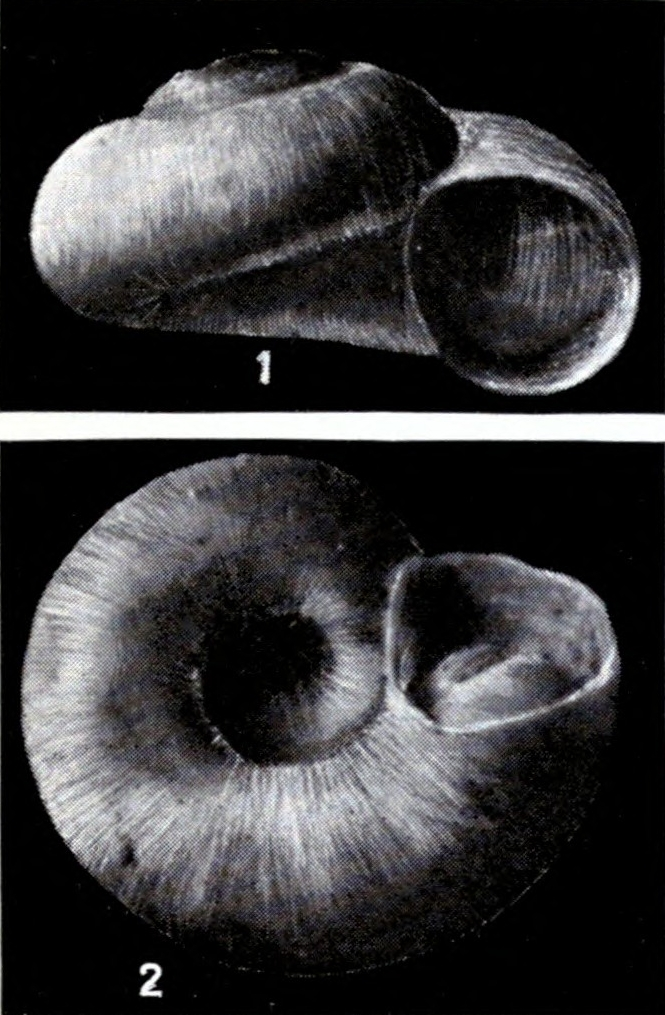
- Two views of the type specimen of Valvata oregonensis. Width: 8.0 mm, height: 5.0 mm.

Scientific classification
- Kingdom: Animalia
- Phylum: Mollusca
- Class: Gastropoda
- Family: Valvatidae
- Genus: Valvata
- Species: V. oregonensis

Binomial name
- Valvata oregonensis Hanna, 1922

Synonyms
- Valvata whitei Hannibal, 1900; Valvata calli Hannibal, 1910; Valvata tricarinata (Say, 1817) (in part)

= Valvata oregonensis =

Valvata oregonensis Temporal range: Pliocene–Pleistocene

Species of gastropod

Valvata oregonensis is a species of fossil freshwater snail with a gill and an operculum, an aquatic gastropod mollusk in the family Valvatidae, the valve snails.

Taylor (1966) stated that Valvata oregonensis is a synonym of Valvata whitei. Despite that the name Valvata oregonensis is still used (for example Pierce 1993).

== Distribution ==
The type locality for this species is the Warner Lakes beds in eastern Oregon. The age is Pliocene.

Valvata oregonensis was a very common species in eastern Oregon during the Pleistocene. The University of Oregon collection contains specimens from numerous localities around the Warner Lakes beds, Snake River Valley and in Lake County.

== Description ==
The shell is composed of four whorls, marked with none to three spiral carinae. The spire is normally low and umbilicus is wide, exposing all the whorls to the apex. There is great variation in the height of the spire and with its increase there is a proportionate decrease in the width of the umbilicus. The apical two whorls are flat and planulate, smooth and shining, unmarked with carinae even when the remainder of the shell may have three. Sculpture is comparatively uniform in character, being composed of fine growth lines.

This species is characterized by its flat nuclear whorls and generally flat shell. Only rarely is the spire as elevated, while great numbers are as flat as the lowest. The thickness of the shells is greater than in any other Valvata species.

Dimensions of the holotype and paratypes are as follows: The width of the shell is 4.6-8.0 mm. The height of the shell is 2.6-5.4 mm. In general the width of shell can reach up to 10 mm and so this is the largest species of North American Valvata.
