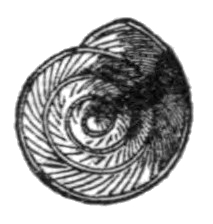
- the operculum of Valvata virens

Conservation status
- Vulnerable (IUCN 2.3)

- Possibly Extinct (NatureServe)

Scientific classification
- Kingdom: Animalia
- Phylum: Mollusca
- Class: Gastropoda
- Family: Valvatidae
- Genus: Valvata
- Species: V. virens

Binomial name
- Valvata virens Tryon, 1863

= Valvata virens =

Species of gastropod

Valvata virens is a species of freshwater snail in the family Valvatidae. It is known by the common name emerald valvata.

This species is endemic to California in the United States. Reports from adjacent states are invalid. Of the two valid occurrences reported in California, at least one is extirpated and the other is in an unknown location. NatureServe has listed the species with the conservation status "possibly extinct".
