= Gongylotaxis =

Scientific classification
- Kingdom: Plantae
- Clade: Tracheophytes
- Clade: Angiosperms
- Clade: Eudicots
- Clade: Asterids
- Order: Apiales
- Family: Apiaceae
- Subfamily: Apioideae
- Tribe: Pyramidoptereae
- Genus: Gongylotaxis; Pimenov & Kljuykov
- Species: G. rechingeri

Binomial name
- Gongylotaxis rechingeri Pimenov & Kljuykov, nom. nov.

Synonyms
- Scaligeria gongylotaxis Rech.f.

Genus of plants

Gongylotaxis is a genus of flowering plants belonging to the family Apiaceae. Its only species is Gongylotaxis rechingeri. Its native range is Afghanistan.

The species was first described in 1987 as Scaligeria gongylotaxis. As the International Code of Nomenclature for algae, fungi, and plants does not allow the genus name and specific epithet to be the same, when transferred to the genus Gongylotaxis in 1996, a new epithet was required, hence the replacement name Gongylotaxis rechingeri.
