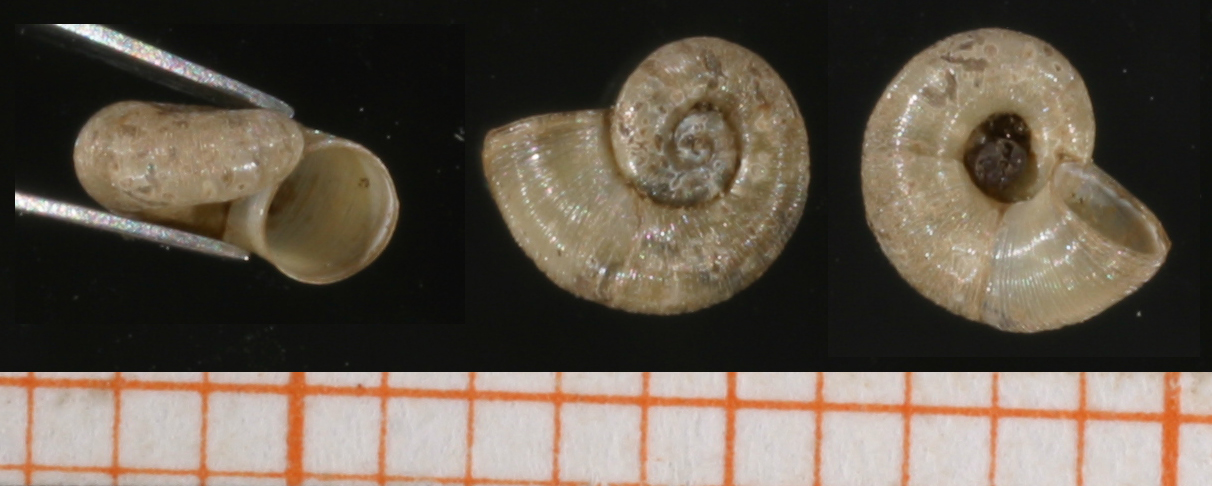
- Three shells of Valvata sibirica

Conservation status
- Least Concern (IUCN 3.1)

Scientific classification
- Kingdom: Animalia
- Phylum: Mollusca
- Class: Gastropoda
- Family: Valvatidae
- Genus: Valvata
- Species: V. sibirica

Binomial name
- Valvata sibirica Middendorff, 1851

= Valvata sibirica =

Species of gastropod

Valvata sibirica is a species of small freshwater snail with an operculum, an aquatic gastropod mollusk in the family Valvatidae, the valve snails.

== Distribution ==
This species occurs in Russia.

== Habitat ==
This snail lives in freshwater habitats.
