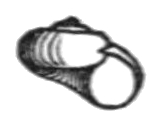
- Drawing: a lateral view of a shell of Valvata lewisi

Conservation status
- Least Concern (IUCN 3.1)

- Secure (NatureServe)

Scientific classification
- Kingdom: Animalia
- Phylum: Mollusca
- Class: Gastropoda
- Family: Valvatidae
- Genus: Valvata
- Species: V. lewisi

Binomial name
- Valvata lewisi Currier, 1868

= Valvata lewisi =

Fringed valvata

Species of gastropod

Valvata lewisi, common name the fringed valvata, is a species of small freshwater snail with a gill and an operculum, an aquatic gastropod mollusk in the family Valvatidae, the valve snails.

== Distribution ==
This species lives in North America.
