= Tillandsia walter-tillii =

Conservation status
- Vulnerable (IUCN 3.1)

Scientific classification
- Kingdom: Plantae
- Clade: Tracheophytes
- Clade: Angiosperms
- Clade: Monocots
- Clade: Commelinids
- Order: Poales
- Family: Bromeliaceae
- Genus: Tillandsia
- Species: T. walter-tillii

Binomial name
- Tillandsia walter-tillii J.R.Grant

Synonyms
- Vriesea tillii Manzan.

Species of flowering plant

Tillandsia walter-tillii is a species of flowering plant in the family Bromeliaceae, endemic to Ecuador. Its natural habitat is subtropical or tropical moist montane forests. It is threatened by habitat loss. It was first described by José Manuel Manzanares in 1998 as Vriesia tillii. When Jason Randall Grant transferred it to the genus Tillandsia in 2004, the epithet had to be changed because the combination Tillandsia tillii was already in use for a different species. Tillandsia walter-tillii is a replacement name.
