= Minidoka Project =

Irrigation project in the United States

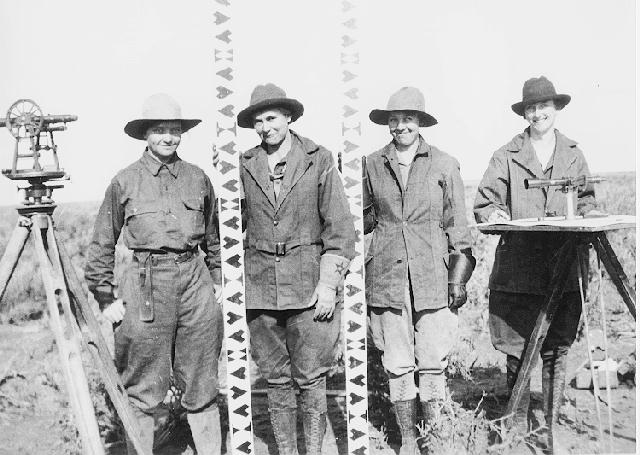
All-female survey crew on the Minidoka Project in 1918

The Minidoka Project is a series of public works by the U.S. Bureau of Reclamation to control the flow of the Snake River in Wyoming and Idaho, supplying irrigation water to farmlands in Idaho. One of the oldest Bureau of Reclamation projects in the United States, the project involves a series of dams and canals intended to store, regulate and distribute the waters of the Snake, with electric power generation as a byproduct. The water irrigates more than a million acres (4,000 km^{2}) of otherwise arid land, producing much of Idaho's potato crop. Other crops include alfalfa, fruit and sugar beets. The primary irrigation district lies between Ashton in eastern Idaho and Bliss in the southwestern corner of the state. Five main reservoirs collect water, distributing it through 1,600 miles (2,600 km) of canals and 4,000 miles (6,400 km) of lateral distribution ditches.

== History ==
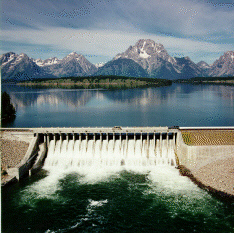
Jackson Lake Dam

Early studies for irrigation in southern Idaho began in 1889–90 by the U.S. Geological Survey. The data developed were made available to the Reclamation Service after the passage of the 1902 Reclamation Act. The Minidoka Project was established in 1904, with construction of Minidoka Dam starting the same year. Water could flow to the north bank of the Snake by gravity, but pumping was required for the south bank. The project was designed to combine flood control and impoundment of spring runoff for use later in the growing season. Jackson Lake and Palisades Reservoir are regulated to keep the flow at Heise, Idaho from exceeding 20,000 cubic feet per second (570 m^{3}/s).

The Minidoka Project contributed to the settlement of the Snake River Plain and river valley, converting semi-arid land to productive farmland. Population rose from a few thousand people in 1915 to more than 200,000 by the 1980s.

During the 1930s the project used labor provided by the Civilian Conservation Corps to construct canals. Later, during World War II, 10,000 Japanese-American internees were held at what is now Minidoka National Historic Site in Jerome County, Idaho. Internees worked on canal maintenance and provided agricultural labor. Population at the Minidoka camp declined to 6500 in 1944, before it was finally closed on October 28, 1945. The former CCC Camp BR-56 at Paul housed some of the internees in 1943, as well as 148 more internees moved from the Manzanar camp in California. Following the closure of the Minidoka camp, the facilities were used by Veterans' Resettlement Program to house returning World War II veterans.

== Facilities ==
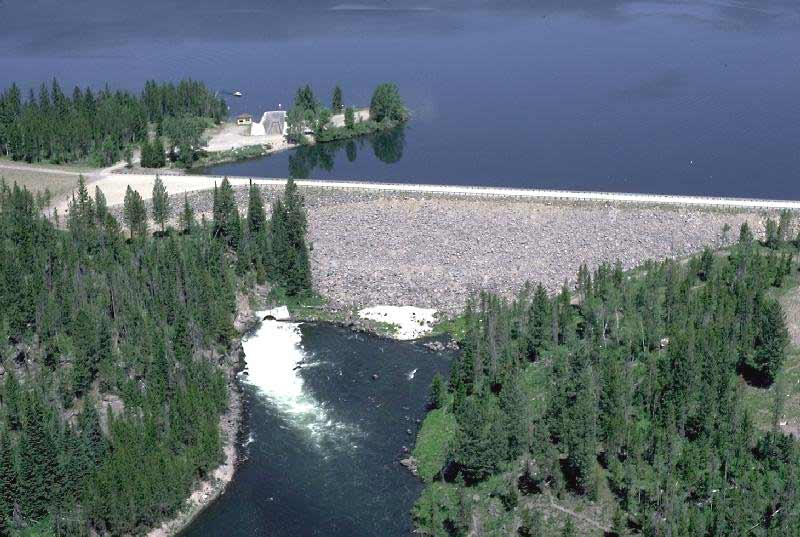
Island Park Dam

The project's dams and reservoirs comprise:

- Jackson Lake Dam in Grand Teton National Park, which raises the elevation of the natural glacial Jackson Lake by 30 feet (9.1 m), with a storage capacity of 847,000 acre-feet (1.045 km^{3}).
- Grassy Lake Dam is located in Wyoming in Bridger-Teton National Forest between Yellowstone National Park and Grand Teton National Park, directly adjacent to the south boundary of Yellowstone. Built between 1935 and 1939, Grassy Lake Dam is 118 feet (36 m) high with a capacity of 15,200 acre-feet (0.0187 km^{3}) on Grassy Creek. Grassy Creek's flow was not sufficient to supply the reservoir reliably, so water from Cascade Creek was diverted by a 14 feet (4.3 m) dam and diversion canal 0.7 miles (1.1 km) long. The lands around Grassy Lake and Island Park Reservoirs are administered by the U.S. Forest Service.
- Island Park Dam on the Henrys Fork of the Snake River, 38 miles (61 km) north of Ashton, Idaho. The 91 feet (28 m) dam has a storage capacity of 135,000 acre-feet (0.167 km^{3}). It was built at the same time as Grassy Lake Dam. Along with the Grassy Lake Reservoir, the Cross Cut diversion dam and the Cross Cut Canal, it forms the Upper Snake River Division of the Minidoka Project. The canal moves water from the Henrys Fork into the Teton River.

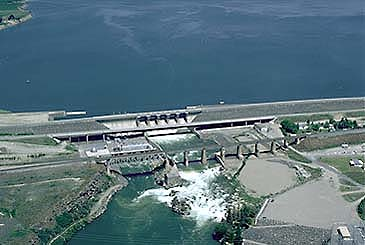
American Falls Dam

- American Falls Reservoir on the main branch of the Snake River, is the largest reservoir in the Minidoka Project, impounded by American Falls Dam. The original dam was built between 1925 and 1927, and was replaced between 1976 and 1978. Reservoir capacity is 1,672,600 acre-feet (2.0631 km^{3}). Construction of the dam and reservoir required the relocation of most of the town of American Falls, with many existing structures relocated.
- Lake Walcott, impounded by Minidoka Dam on the Snake. Minidoka Dam started construction in 1904 to provide irrigation and power. The lake has a capacity of 210,200 acre-feet (0.2593 km^{3}). The power plant was one of the first to be installed in a Bureau of Reclamation project, providing power principally for pumping operations. Much of Lake Walcott is within Minidoka National Wildlife Refuge, providing habitat for waterfowl. The dam and powerplant are listed on the National Register of Historic Places.

The five main reservoirs are connected by a network of canals and pumping stations to regulate and distribute the water, supplying more than 1 million acres (4,000 km^{2}).

== Associated projects ==
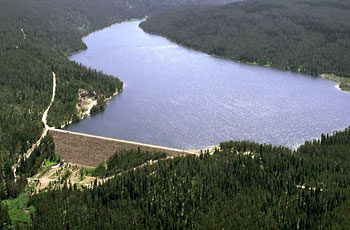
Grassy Lake Dam and reservoir

Palisades Reservoir on the Snake in Idaho and Wyoming is operated by the Bureau of Reclamation, but is not part of the Minidoka Project. Operated as the separate Palisades Project, the zoned earthfill dam is operated in coordination with the Minidoka and Michaud Flats projects, storing 1,401,000 acre-feet (1.728 km^{3}) and generating up to 176 megawatts of power. Palisades was built in the 1950s to address downstream water shortfalls.

The Michaud Flats project serves 11,240 acres (4,550 ha) with a pumping station on the left bank of the Snake, just below American Falls Dam, and 25 wells.

The Teton Basin Project on the upper Teton River in eastern Idaho comprised the Teton Dam and reservoir. The dam failed on June 6, 1976, as the 288,250-acre-foot (0.35555 km^{3}) reservoir was being filled, leading to extensive flooding in the Minidoka project area. The Ririe Project in the Willow Creek drainage stores up to 100,500 acre-feet (0.1240 km^{3}) of drainage from the Caribou Range.
