= Xeropsamobeus asellus =

Scientific classification
- Kingdom: Animalia
- Phylum: Arthropoda
- Clade: Pancrustacea
- Class: Insecta
- Order: Coleoptera
- Suborder: Polyphaga
- Infraorder: Scarabaeiformia
- Family: Scarabaeidae
- Genus: Xeropsamobeus
- Species: X. asellus

Binomial name
- Xeropsamobeus asellus (Schmidt, 1907)

Synonyms
- Aphodius nanus Horn, 1887; Aphodius asellus Schmidt, 1907 – replacement name

Species of beetle

Xeropsamobeus asellus is a species of aphodiine dung beetle in the family Scarabaeidae. It is found in the United States and Mexico, although other sources consider it endemic to Texas.
