= Valvata aphanotylopsis =

Scientific classification
- Kingdom: Animalia
- Phylum: Mollusca
- Class: Gastropoda
- Family: Valvatidae
- Genus: Valvata
- Species: †V. aphanotylopsis

Binomial name
- †Valvata aphanotylopsis Brusina, 1902

Synonyms
- † Valvata (Valvata) aphanotylopsis Brusina, 1902 alternative representation

Extinct species of gastropod

Valvata (Valvata) aphanotylopsis is an extinct species of small freshwater snail in the family Valvatidae, the valve snails. This species is known only from fossil material.

== Distribution and fossil record ==
Fossils of Valvata aphanotylopsis have been recorded from Lower Miocene (Pontian) deposits in the Balkans. The species was originally described by S. Brusina in 1902 based on specimens from Begalijica, Serbia.
