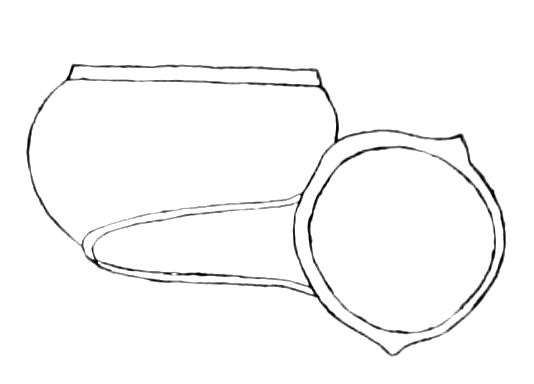
- Drawing: lateral view of the shell of Valvata bicarinata.

Conservation status
- Secure (NatureServe)

Scientific classification
- Kingdom: Animalia
- Phylum: Mollusca
- Class: Gastropoda
- Family: Valvatidae
- Genus: Valvata
- Species: V. bicarinata

Binomial name
- Valvata bicarinata Lea, 1841

Synonyms
- Valvata bicarinata bicarinata Lea, 1841; Valvata bicarinata normalis Walker, 1902; Valvata bicarinata var. connectans Walker, 1906; Valvata bicarinata var. normalis Walker, 1902; Valvata normalis Walker, 1902

= Valvata bicarinata =

Species of gastropod

Valvata bicarinata, common name the two-ridge valvata, is a species of small freshwater snail with a gill and an operculum, an aquatic gastropod mollusk in the family Valvatidae, the valve snails.
