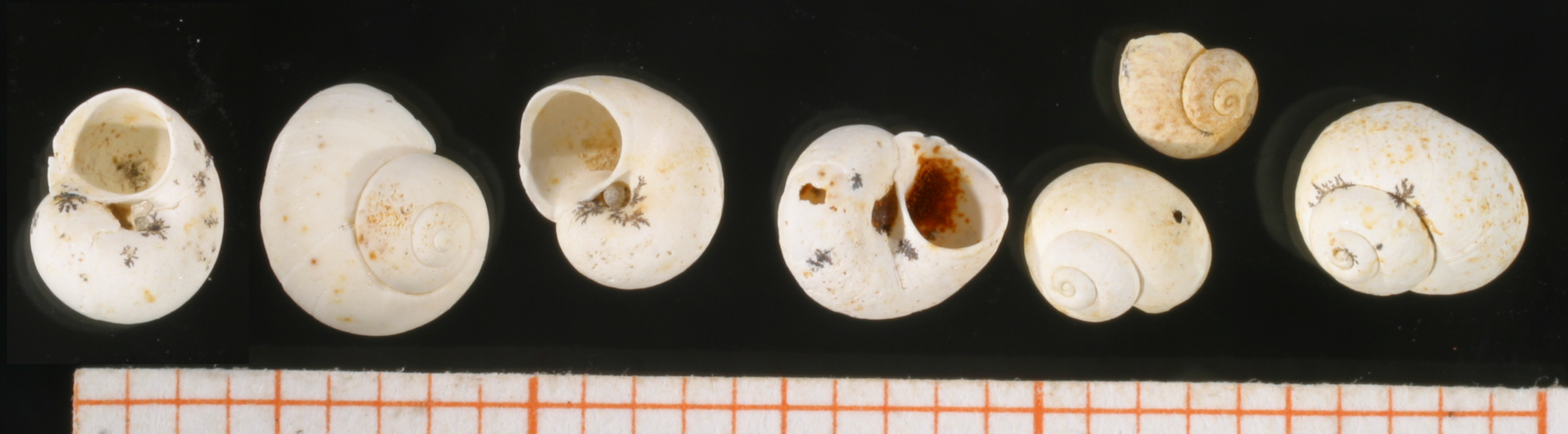
- Subfossil shells

Conservation status
- Least Concern (IUCN 3.1)

Scientific classification
- Kingdom: Animalia
- Phylum: Mollusca
- Class: Gastropoda
- Family: Valvatidae
- Genus: Borysthenia
- Species: B. naticina

Binomial name
- Borysthenia naticina (Menke, 1845)

Synonyms
- Valvata naticina Menke, 1845; Valvata jelskii Crosse, 1863

= Borysthenia naticina =

Species of gastropod

Borysthenia naticina is a species of small freshwater snail with a gill and an operculum, an aquatic gastropod mollusc in the family Valvatidae, the valve snails.

== Distribution ==
This species occurs in the Pontic and Baltic regions as follows:

- Germany - critically endangered (vom Aussterben bedroht)
- Poland - critically endangered
- Slovakia

== Habitat ==
This is a freshwater species.
