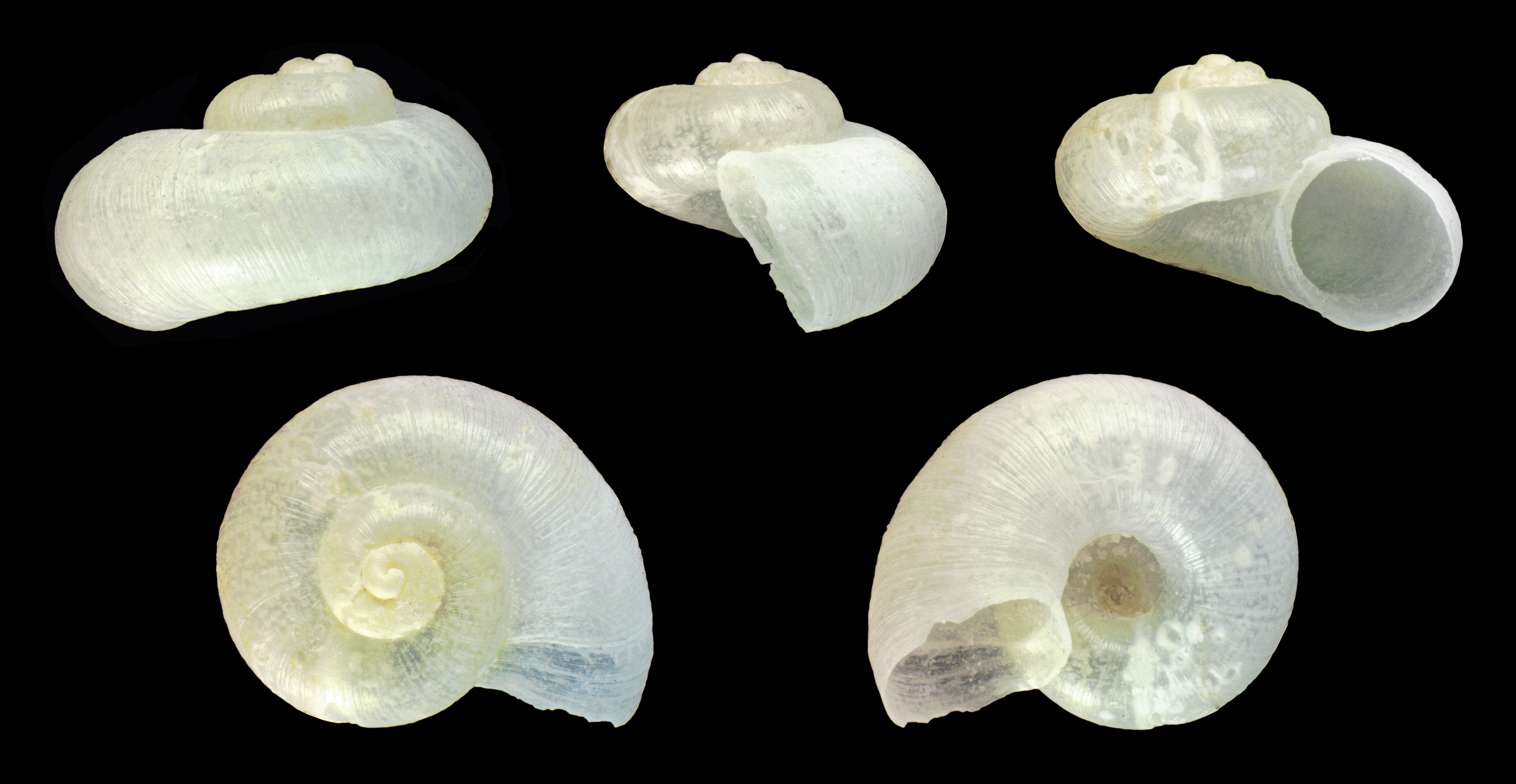
- A shell of Valvata macrostoma

Conservation status
- Least Concern (IUCN 3.1)

Scientific classification
- Kingdom: Animalia
- Phylum: Mollusca
- Class: Gastropoda
- Family: Valvatidae
- Genus: Valvata
- Species: V. macrostoma

Binomial name
- Valvata macrostoma Mörch, 1864

= Valvata macrostoma =

Species of gastropod

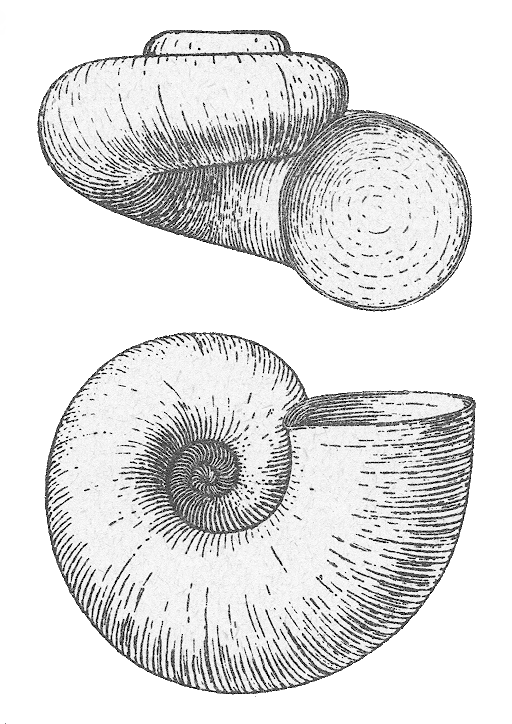
Drawing: two views of the shell of Valvata macrostoma

Valvata macrostoma, also known as the large mouthed valve snail, is a species of small freshwater snail with an operculum, an aquatic gastropod mollusk in the family Valvatidae, the valve snails.

== Distribution ==
This species occurs in the following countries and islands:

- Czech Republic - in Bohemia only
- Slovakia
- Poland
- Germany - high endangered (Stark gefährdet)
- Netherlands
- Great Britain

== Ecology ==
This freshwater snail lives in marshes and very small canals that have a very rich fauna and calcium-rich water.

Myzyk (2004) described life cycle of Valvata macrostoma.
