= Xeropsamobeus =

Scientific classification
- Kingdom: Animalia
- Phylum: Arthropoda
- Clade: Pancrustacea
- Class: Insecta
- Order: Coleoptera
- Suborder: Polyphaga
- Infraorder: Scarabaeiformia
- Family: Scarabaeidae
- Subfamily: Aphodiinae
- Tribe: Aphodiini
- Genus: Xeropsamobeus; Saylor, 1937

Genus of beetles

Xeropsamobeus is a genus of aphodiine dung beetles in the family Scarabaeidae. There are about 10 described species in Xeropsamobeus.

== Species ==
These 10 species belong to the genus Xeropsamobeus:

- Xeropsamobeus acerbus (Horn, 1887)
- Xeropsamobeus ambiguus (Fall, 1907)
- Xeropsamobeus arenicolus Gordon and Skelley, 2007
- Xeropsamobeus asellus (Schmidt, 1907)
- Xeropsamobeus brighti Gordon and Skelley, 2007
- Xeropsamobeus desertus (Van Dyke, 1918)
- Xeropsamobeus doyeni Gordon and Skelley, 2007
- Xeropsamobeus mohavei Gordon and Skelley, 2007
- Xeropsamobeus padrei Gordon and Skelley, 2007
- Xeropsamobeus scabriceps (LeConte, 1878)
