= Xeropsamobeus scabriceps =

Scientific classification
- Kingdom: Animalia
- Phylum: Arthropoda
- Clade: Pancrustacea
- Class: Insecta
- Order: Coleoptera
- Suborder: Polyphaga
- Infraorder: Scarabaeiformia
- Family: Scarabaeidae
- Genus: Xeropsamobeus
- Species: X. scabriceps

Binomial name
- Xeropsamobeus scabriceps (LeConte, 1878)

Synonyms
- Aphodius scabriceps LeConte, 1878

Species of beetle

Xeropsamobeus scabriceps is a species of aphodiine dung beetle in the family Scarabaeidae. It is found in Canada (Alberta, Saskatchewan), the United States (Colorado, Kansas, Nebraska, Texas) and Mexico (Nuevo León).
