= Xeropsamobeus ambiguus =

Scientific classification
- Kingdom: Animalia
- Phylum: Arthropoda
- Clade: Pancrustacea
- Class: Insecta
- Order: Coleoptera
- Suborder: Polyphaga
- Infraorder: Scarabaeiformia
- Family: Scarabaeidae
- Genus: Xeropsamobeus
- Species: X. ambiguus

Binomial name
- Xeropsamobeus ambiguus (Fall, 1907)

Synonyms
- Psammodius ambiguus Fall, 1907

Species of beetle

Xeropsamobeus ambiguus is a species of aphodiine dung beetle in the family Scarabaeidae. It is found in the United States (Texas).
