= Lake Walcott State Park =

State park in Idaho, United States

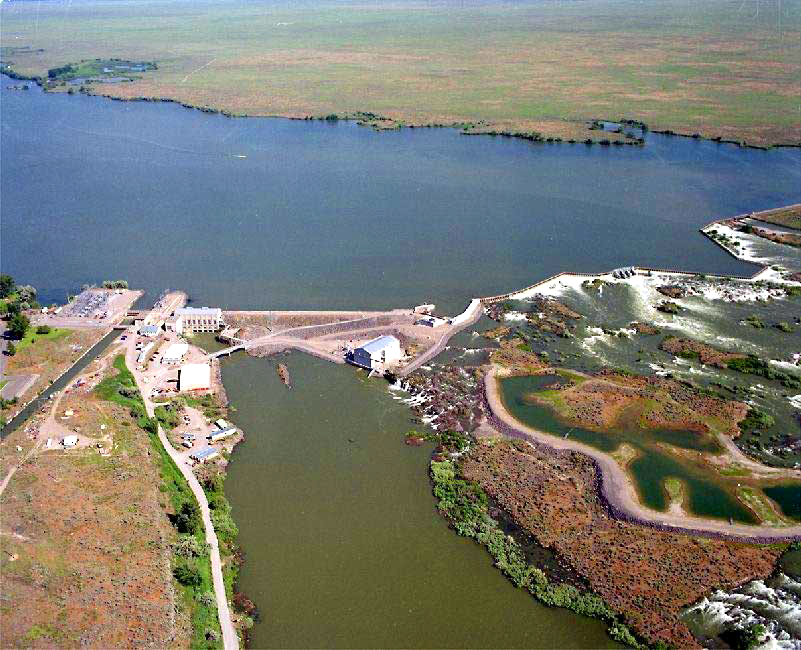
- Lake Walcott

- Location within Idaho Location within the United States
- Location: Minidoka County, Idaho, United States
- Nearest city: Acequia, Idaho
- Coordinates: 42°40′30″N 113°28′59″W
- Area: 65 acres (26 ha)
- Elevation: 4,700 ft (1,400 m)
- Established: 1999
- Administrator: Idaho Department of Parks and Recreation
- Website: Official website

Lake Walcott State Park is a public recreation area located near the Minidoka Dam six miles (9.7 km) east of Acequia in Minidoka County, Idaho, United States. The state park encompasses 65 acres (26 ha) on the western shore on Lake Walcott, an 8,000-acre (3,200 ha) impoundment of the Snake River. The Minidoka National Wildlife Refuge adjoins the park and the lake. The park's recreational offerings include disc golf, camping, picnicking, boating, fishing, and water sports.

== See also ==
- List of Idaho state parks
- National Parks in Idaho
