= Valvata humeralis =

Conservation status
- Least Concern (IUCN 3.1)

- Secure (NatureServe)

Scientific classification
- Kingdom: Animalia
- Phylum: Mollusca
- Class: Gastropoda
- Family: Valvatidae
- Genus: Valvata
- Species: V. humeralis

Binomial name
- Valvata humeralis Say, 1829

Synonyms
- Valvata humeralis californica Pilsbry, 1909; Valvata humeralis var. patzcuarensis Pilsbry, 1899; Valvata humeralis var. pilsbryi von Martens, 1899; Valvata strebeli Fischer & Crosse, 1891

Species of gastropod

Valvata humeralis is a species of gastropod belonging to the family Valvatidae.

The species is found in North America. The species inhabits freshwater environments.
