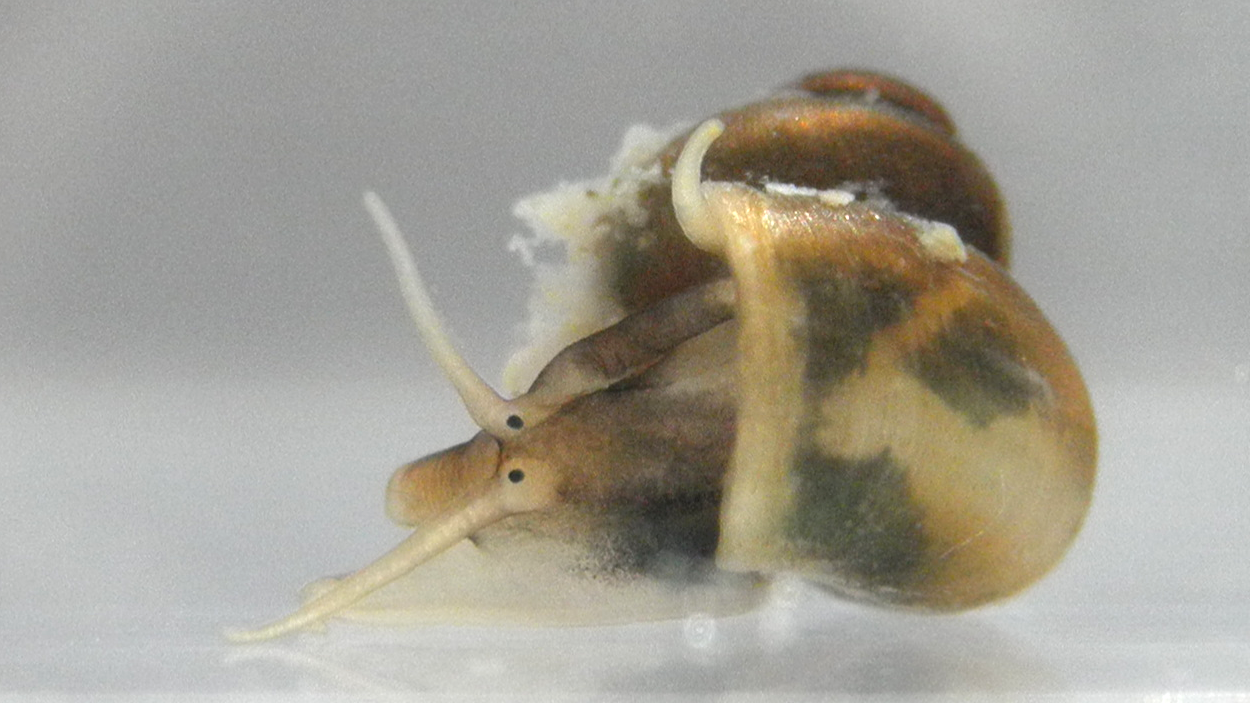
- a live Valvata piscinalis
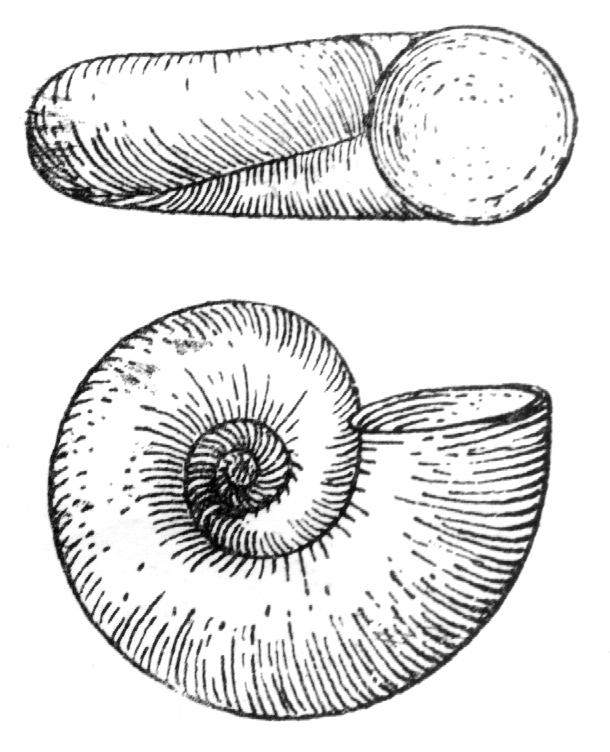
- Drawing: two views of a shell of Valvata cristata, the type species of the genus Valvata

Scientific classification
- Kingdom: Animalia
- Phylum: Mollusca
- Class: Gastropoda
- Family: Valvatidae
- Genus: Valvata; O. F. Müller, 1773

Type species
- Valvata cristata O. F. Müller, 1774

= Valvata =

Genus of gastropods

Valvata is a genus of very small freshwater snails with an operculum, aquatic gastropod mollusks in the family Valvatidae, the valve snails.

== Synonyms ==
- Cincinna Hübner, 1810 · accepted, alternate representation (Cincinna is treated as subgenus of Valvata)
- Cincinna (Atropidina) Lindholm, 1906 (subgenus-genus combination invalid; Atropidina is considered a junior synonym of Tropidina or Cincinna (depending on source); to avoid problems we refer to Valvata only)
- Cincinna (Cincinna) Hübner, 1810 (Cincinna is treated as subgenus of Valvata)
- Gyrorbis Fitzinger, 1833 (junior synonym (?))
- Planorbis (Gyrorbis) Fitzinger, 1833 (junior synonym (?))
- Valvata (Atropidina) Lindholm, 1906 (type species of Atropidina (Valvata pulchella Studer, 1789) is considered a junior synonym of V. (Cincinna) piscinalis; however, FE ranks Atropidina as synonym of Tropidina (type species: V. macrostoma Mörch, 1864); to avoid problems we refer to Valvata)

== Species ==
Species in the genus: Valvata O.F. Müller, 1773 include:

(All the European species are included in this list.)

- Subgenus † Valvata (Aphanotylus) Brusina, 1894
  - † Valvata (Aphanotylus) adeorboides Fuchs, 1870
  - † Valvata (Aphanotylus) cossmanni (Brusina, 1894)
  - † Valvata (Aphanotylus) fuchsi (Brusina, 1894)
  - † Valvata (Aphanotylus) hellenica Tournouër in Fischer, 1877
  - † Valvata (Aphanotylus) kupensis Fuchs, 1870
  - † Valvata (Aphanotylus) moesiensis Jekelius, 1944
  - † Valvata (Aphanotylus) ristici (Pavlović, 1931)
- Subgenus: Cincinna Hübner, 1810
  - † Valvata (Cincinna) almerai Almera, 1894
  - † Valvata (Cincinna) balizacensis (Degrange-Touzin, 1892)
  - † Valvata (Cincinna) banatica Brusina, 1902
  - Valvata (Cincinna) biwaensis Preston, 1916 = Biwakovalvata biwaensis
  - † Valvata (Cincinna) bouei Pavlović, 1903
  - † Valvata (Cincinna) bugensis (Gozhik in Gozhik & Datsenko, 2007)
  - † Valvata (Cincinna) bukowskii Brusina, 1897
  - † Valvata (Cincinna) carasiensis Jekelius, 1944
  - † Valvata (Cincinna) chalinei Schlickum & Puisségur, 1978
  - † Valvata (Cincinna) cobalcescui Brusina, 1885
  - † Valvata (Cincinna) connectens Brusina, 1892
  - † Valvata (Cincinna) costatus Taner, 1974
  - † Valvata (Cincinna) crusitensis Fontannes, 1887
  - † Valvata (Cincinna) deshayesi Denainvilliers, 1875†
  - † Valvata (Cincinna) eugeniae Neumayr in Herbich & Neumayr, 1875
  - † Valvata (Cincinna) fossaruliformis Brusina, 1902
  - † Valvata (Cincinna) furlici Brusina, 1897
  - † Valvata (Cincinna) giraudi Dollfus, 1908
  - † Valvata (Cincinna) hoernesi Penecke, 1886
  - † Valvata (Cincinna) ilici Brusina, 1897
  - † Valvata (Cincinna) interposita de Stefani, 1880
  - † Valvata (Cincinna) jaccardi Locard, 1893
  - † Valvata (Cincinna) jalpuchensis (Gozhik, 2002)
  - † Valvata (Cincinna) larteti Bourguignat, 1881
  - † Valvata (Cincinna) lessonae Sacco, 1886
  - † Valvata (Cincinna) lorentheyi Wenz, 1928
  - † Valvata (Cincinna) lucici Brusina, 1902
  - † Valvata (Cincinna) molnarae Soós in Bartha & Soós, 1955
  - † Valvata (Cincinna) neglecta Brusina, 1902
  - † Valvata (Cincinna) orientalis Fischer in Tchihatcheff, 1866
  - † Valvata (Cincinna) paviai Schlickum & Strauch, 1979
  - † Valvata (Cincinna) peneckei Brusina, 1892
  - † Valvata (Cincinna) petronijevici Milošević, 1973
  - Valvata (Cincinna) piscinalis (O.F. Müller, 1774) - European stream valvata
    - Valvata (Cincinna) piscinalis piscinalis (O.F. Müller, 1774) - European stream valvata
    - Valvata (Cincinna) piscinalis alpestris (Küster, 1853)
    - Valvata (Cincinna) piscinalis antiqua (Morris, 1838)
    - Valvata (Cincinna) piscinalis discors Westerlund, 1886
    - Valvata (Cincinna) piscinalis geyeri (Menzel, 1904)
  - † Valvata (Cincinna) piscinaloidis Michaud, 1855
  - † Valvata (Cincinna) pontica Pană, 1990
  - † Valvata (Cincinna) praepiscinalis (Gozhik in Gozhik & Datsenko, 2007)
  - † Valvata (Cincinna) prutulensis (Gozhik in Gozhik & Datsenko, 2007)
  - † Valvata (Cincinna) pseudoalpestris Brusina, 1902
  - † Valvata (Cincinna) radiatula Sandberger, 1875
  - Valvata (Cincinna) saulcyi Bourguignat, 1853
  - † Valvata (Cincinna) sibinensis Neumayr in Neumayr & Paul, 1875
  - † Valvata (Cincinna) soceni Jekelius, 1944
  - Valvata (Cincinna) stenotrema Polinski, 1929
  - † Valvata (Cincinna) stiriaca Rolle, 1860
  - Valvata (Cincinna) studeri Boeters & Falkner, 1998
  - † Valvata (Cincinna) subcarinata Brusina, 1878
  - † Valvata (Cincinna) tihanyensis Lörenthey, 1906
  - † Valvata (Cincinna) unicarinata Lörenthey, 1893
  - † Valvata (Cincinna) vallestris Fontannes, 1876
  - † Valvata (Cincinna) vanciana Tournouër, 1875
  - † Valvata (Cincinna) variabilis Fuchs, 1870
  - † Valvata (Cincinna) varians Lörenthey, 1902
  - † Valvata (Cincinna) vinogradovkaensis (Gozhik, 2002)
  - † Valvata (Cincinna) vivipariformis Oppenheim, 1891
  - † Valvata (Cincinna) vrabceana Gorjanović-Kramberger, 1890
  - Cincinna japonica
  - Cincinna kizakikoensis
- Subgenus: Costovalvata Polinski, 1929
  - Valvata (Costovalvata) hirsutecostata Polinski, 1929
  - Valvata (Costovalvata) klemmi Schütt, 1962
  - † Valvata (Costovalvata) pagana Bulić & Jurišić-Polšak, 2009
  - Valvata (Costovalvata) rhabdota Sturany, 1894
- Subgenus: Ohridotropidina Hadžišce 1955
  - Valvata (Ohridotropidina) relicta (Polinski, 1929)
- Subgenus: Tropidina H. &. A. Adams, 1854
  - Valvata (Tropidina) pulchella Studer, 1820
  - † Valvata (Tropidina) salebrosa Meijer, 1990
  - Valvata (Tropidina) bicarinata I. Lea, 1841 - two-ridge valvata
- Subgenus: Valvata O.F. Müller, 1773
  - † Valvata (Valvata) abdita Brusina, 1902
  - † Valvata (Valvata) aphanotylopsis Brusina, 1902
  - Valvata (Valvata) cristata O.F. Müller, 1774
  - † Valvata (Valvata) cyclostoma (Brusina, 1902)
  - † Valvata (Valvata) cyclostrema Brusina, 1892
  - † Valvata (Valvata) debilis Fuchs, 1870
  - † Valvata (Valvata) euristoma Brusina, 1902
  - † Valvata (Valvata) exotica Papp, 1954
  - Valvata (Valvata) hokkaidoensis Miyadi, 1935
  - † Valvata (Valvata) homalogyra Brusina, 1874
  - † Valvata (Valvata) kochi Pavlović, 1932
  - † Valvata (Valvata) leptonema Brusina, 1892
  - † Valvata (Valvata) marginata Michaud, 1855
  - † Valvata (Valvata) palmotici Brusina, 1902
  - † Valvata (Valvata) pisidica Oppenheim, 1919
  - † Valvata (Valvata) sulekiana Brusina, 1874
  - † Valvata (Valvata) symmetra (Ludwig, 1865)
  - † Valvata (Valvata) toplicani Milošević, 1984
  - † Valvata (Valvata) tournoueri Capellini, 1880
- Subgenus: ? (not know yet)
  - Valvata montenegrina Gloër & Pešić, 2007

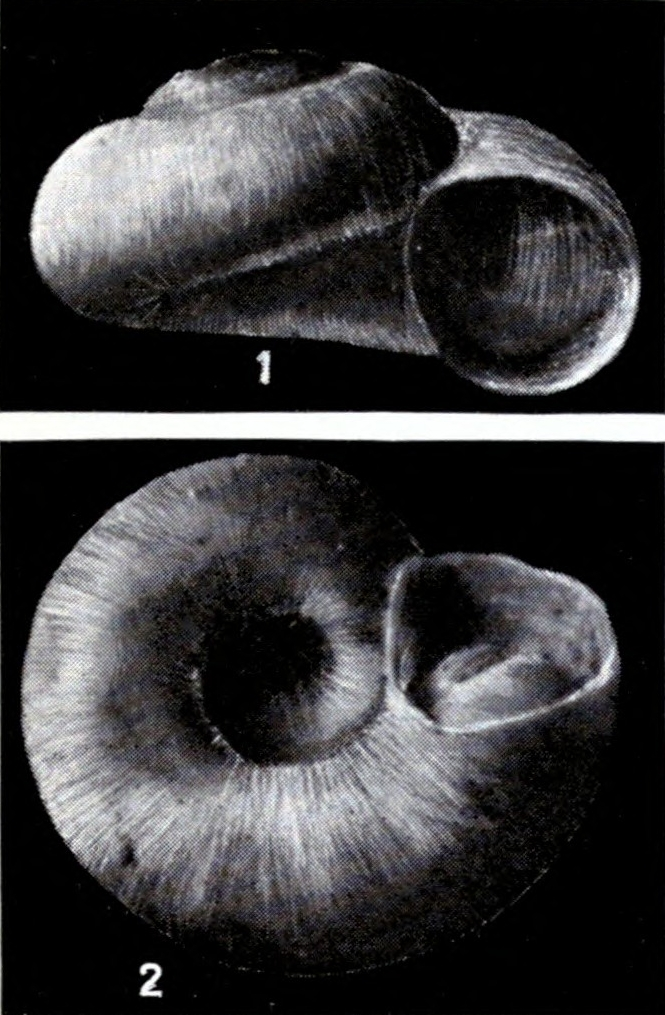
Two views of the type specimen of Valvata oregonensis. Width: 8.0 mm, height: 5.0 mm.

- Subgenus: ? (not known for Wikipedians)
  - Valvata aliena Westerlund, 1877
  - Valvata ambigua Westerlund, 1873
  - † Valvata avia (Eichwald, 1853)
  - † Valvata cincta Taner, 1974
  - † Valvata gregaria Bukowski, 1896
  - † Valvata heidemariae Willmann, 1981
  - † Valvata helicoides Stoliczka, 1862
  - Valvata humeralis Say, 1829 - glossy valvata
  - † Valvata incerta Yen, 1947 - late Cenozoic
  - Valvata inflata Sandberger, 1875
  - † Valvata kamirensis Willmann, 1981
  - † Valvata kavusani Schütt in Schütt & Kavuşan, 1984
  - † Valvata kubanica Krestovnikov, 1931
  - Valvata lewisi Currier, 1868 - fringed valvata
  - Valvata macrostoma (Mörch, 1864)
  - Valvata mergella Westerlund, 1883 - rams-horn valvata
  - † Valvata moguntina (Boettger, 1884)
  - Valvata montenegrina Glöer & Pešić, 2008
  - † Valvata multicarinata Yen, 1946 - from Tertiary
  - Valvata normalis S. Walker
  - Valvata nowshahrensis Glöer & Pešić, 2012
  - † Valvata obtusaeformis Lörenthey, 1906
  - † Valvata ocsensis Soós, 1934
  - † Valvata oregonensis Hanna, 1922
  - † Valvata paula Pierce, 1993
  - Valvata perdepressa Walker, 1906 - purplecap valvata
  - † Valvata planconcava Pavlović, 1927
  - † Valvata politioanei Jekelius, 1944
  - † Valvata polystriata Pavlović, 1927
  - † Valvata procera Russell, 1952 - from Oligocene
  - † Valvata pseudoadeorbis Sinzov, 1880
  - † Valvata radovanovici Pavlović, 1931
  - † Valvata semigradata Pavlović, 1927
  - Valvata sibirica Middendorff, 1851
  - Valvata simusyuensis
  - Valvata sincera Say, 1824 - mossy valvata
  - † Valvata singularis (Gozhik in Gozhik & Datsenko, 2007)
  - † Valvata skhiadica Bukowski, 1896
  - † Valvata striolata Pavlović, 1927
  - † Valvata subbiformis Gozhik in Gozhik & Prysjazhnjuk, 1978
  - † Valvata subgradata Lörenthey, 1902
  - † Valvata subumbilicata (Meek & Hayden, 1856) - from Middle Cenozoic (Oligocene)
  - Valvata tricarinata (Say, 1817) - three-ridge valvata, threeridge valvata
  - † Valvata turislavica Jekelius, 1944
  - Valvata utahensis Call, 1884 - Utah roundmouth snail
  - † Valvata velitzelosi Schütt in Schütt & Velitzelos, 1991
  - Valvata virens Tryon, 1863 - emerald valvata
  - † Valvata wenzi Papp, 1953
  - † Valvata windhauseni Parodiz, 1961
  - Valvata winnebagoensis F. C. Baker, 1928 - flanged valvata

Species brought into synonymy

- † Valvata euomphalus Fuchs, 1877: synonym of † Graecamnicola euomphalus (Fuchs, 1877)
- † Valvata (Aphanotylus) pseudoadeorboides Sinzov, 1880: synonym of † Valvata pseudoadeorbis Sinzov, 1880
- † Valvata (Cincinna) gaudryana Tournouër, 1866: synonym of † Valvata inflata Sandberger, 1875
- † Valvata (Valvata) simplex bicincta Fuchs, 1870: synonym of † Muellerpalia bicincta (Fuchs, 1870)

== Bibliography ==
- Vaught, K.C. (1989). A classification of the living Mollusca. American Malacologists: Melbourne, FL (USA). ISBN 0-915826-22-4. XII, 195 pp.
