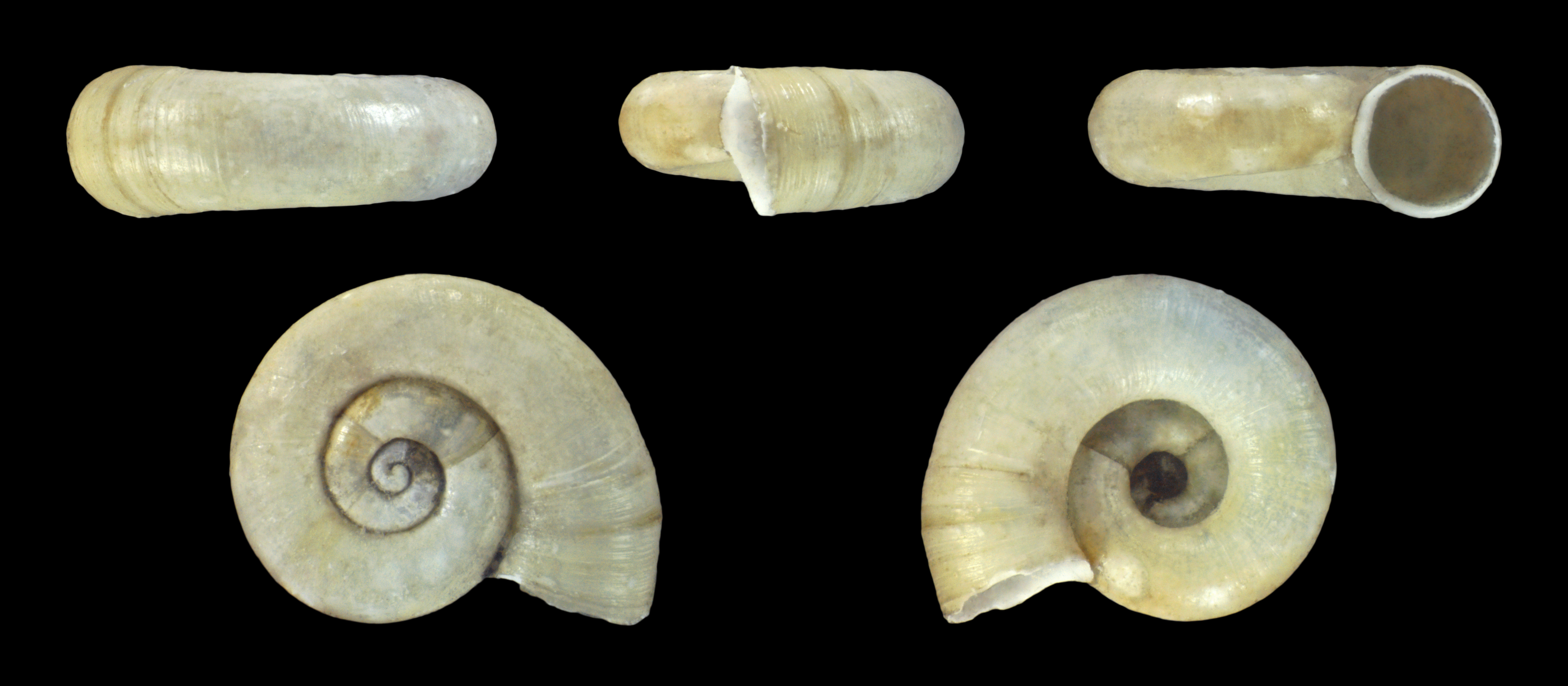
- Five views of a shell of Valvata cristata

Scientific classification
- Domain: Eukaryota
- Kingdom: Animalia
- Phylum: Mollusca
- Class: Gastropoda
- Family: Valvatidae
- Genus: Valvata
- Species: V. cristata

Binomial name
- Valvata cristata O. F. Müller, 1774

= Valvata cristata =

Species of gastropod

Valvata cristata is a species of small freshwater snail with an operculum, an aquatic gastropod mollusk or micromollusk in the family Valvatidae, the valve snails.

== Distribution ==
- Czech Republic - Bohemia and Moravia
- Slovakia
- Poland
- Germany - (Arten der Vorwarnliste)
- Netherlands
- the British Isles: Great Britain and Ireland
- Hungary
- Kaliningrad Oblast, Russia
- and other areas

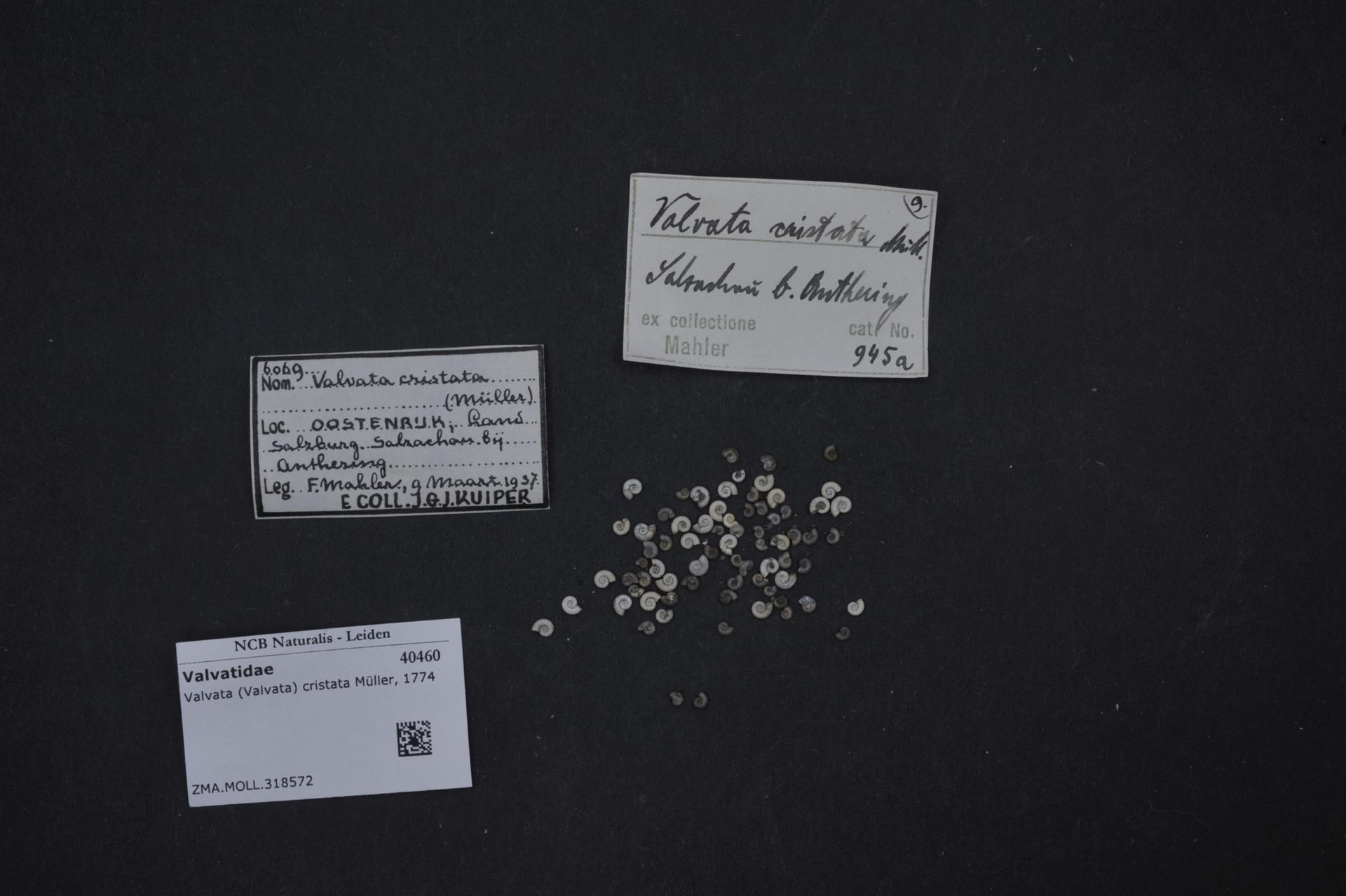
Specimens of V.cristata in Naturalis Biodiversity Center. Note the tiny size

== Shell description ==
The shell of this exceeding small (2–4 mm) Valvata species is very flat in its coiling, and therefore it somewhat resembles a Planorbis shell. However, the shell is dextral in coiling and has an operculum. The shell is transparent, has 3-3.5 whorls in a circular aperture. The umbilicus is wide and open, more than 1/3 of shell diameter.

== Ecology ==
This species lives in stagnant and slow-moving water.

Myzyk (2002) described life cycle of Valvata cristata.
