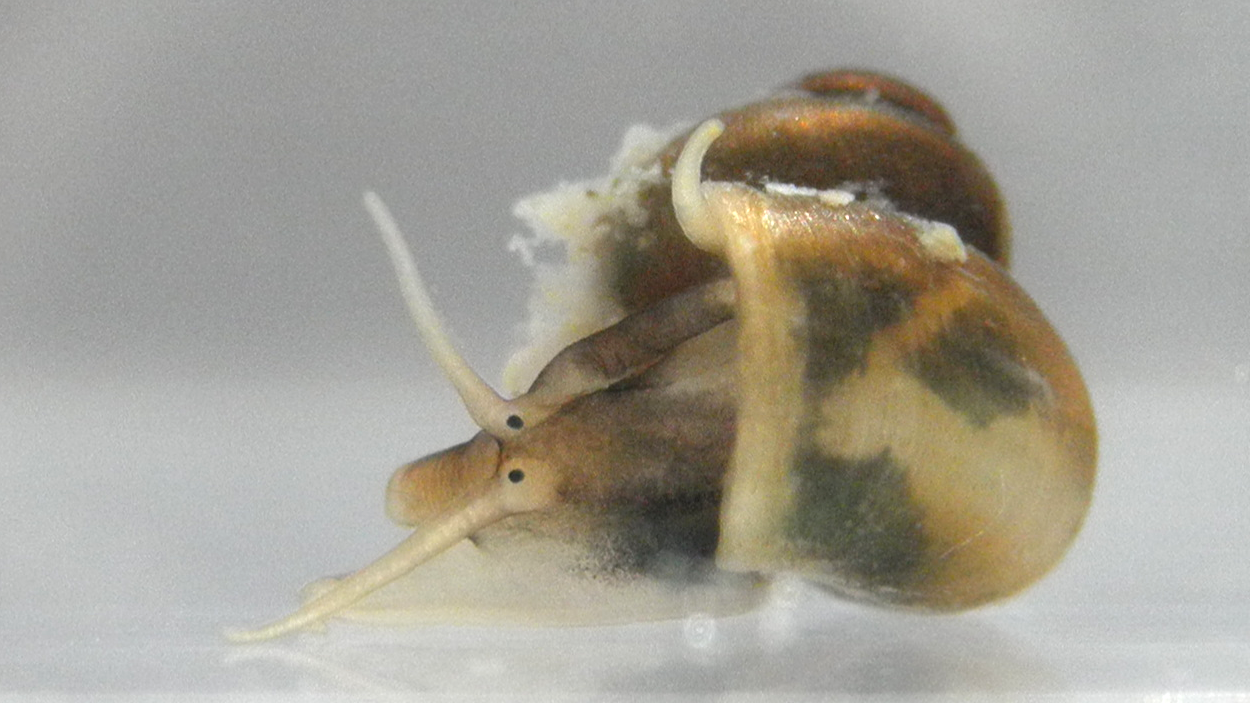
- a live Valvata piscinalis

Conservation status
- Least Concern (IUCN 3.1)

- Secure (NatureServe)

Scientific classification
- Kingdom: Animalia
- Phylum: Mollusca
- Class: Gastropoda
- Family: Valvatidae
- Genus: Valvata
- Species: V. piscinalis

Binomial name
- Valvata piscinalis (Müller, 1774)

Synonyms
- Cincinna (Cincinna) piscinalis (Müller, 1774); Cyclostoma obtusum Draparnaud, 1801; Helix fascicularis Gmelin, 1791; Nerita obtusa Studer, 1789; Nerita piscinalis Müller, 1774; Turbo fontinalis Pulteney, 1799; Valvata (Atropidina) pulchella Studer, 1789; Valvata (Cincinna) ambigua Westerlund, 1873; Valvata (Cincinna) piscinalis (Müller, 1774); Valvata (Cincinna) piscinalis var. ladogaensis Lindholm, 1912; Valvata (Cincinna) piscinalis var. scharffi Westerlund, 1894; Valvata (Cincinna) skorikovi Lindholm, 1912; Valvata (Tropidina) profunda Clessin, 1890; Valvata ambigua Westerlund, 1873; Valvata compressa Locard, 1889; Valvata gallica Locard, 1889; Valvata piscinalis var. acuminata Jeffreys, 1862; Valvata piscinalis var. costulata Drouët, 1867; Valvata piscinalis var. hyalina Wattebled, 1889; Valvata piscinalis var. submucronata Schmidt, 1856; Valvata piscinalis var. subnaticina Piaget, 1913; Valvata pulchella Studer, 1789; Valvata sequanica Locard, 1884; Valvata servaini Locard, 1889

= Valvata piscinalis =

Species of gastropod

Valvata piscinalis, common name the European stream valvata or European valve snail, is a species of small freshwater snail with gills and an operculum, an aquatic gastropod mollusk in the family Valvatidae, the valve snails. It is also known as Cincinna piscinalis (Müller, 1774).

== Subspecies ==
Subspecies of Valvata piscinalis include:

- Valvata piscinalis piscinalis (O. F. Müller, 1774)
- Valvata piscinalis antiqua (Morris, 1838)
- Valvata piscinalis geyeri (Menzel, 1904) - The name geyeri is in honor of German zoologist David Geyer (1855–1932).
- Valvata piscinalis discors (Westerlund, 1886)
- Valvata piscinalis alpestris (Küster, 1853)

== Shell description ==
Valvata piscinalis has a somewhat pinched aperture and an attenuate spire. The spire height tends to increases in more eutrophic conditions. Shells of this species often exhibit four or five whorls and are white to beige with more orange to red pigmentation apically. The operculum shows spiral markings of around 10 turns, originating almost centrally.

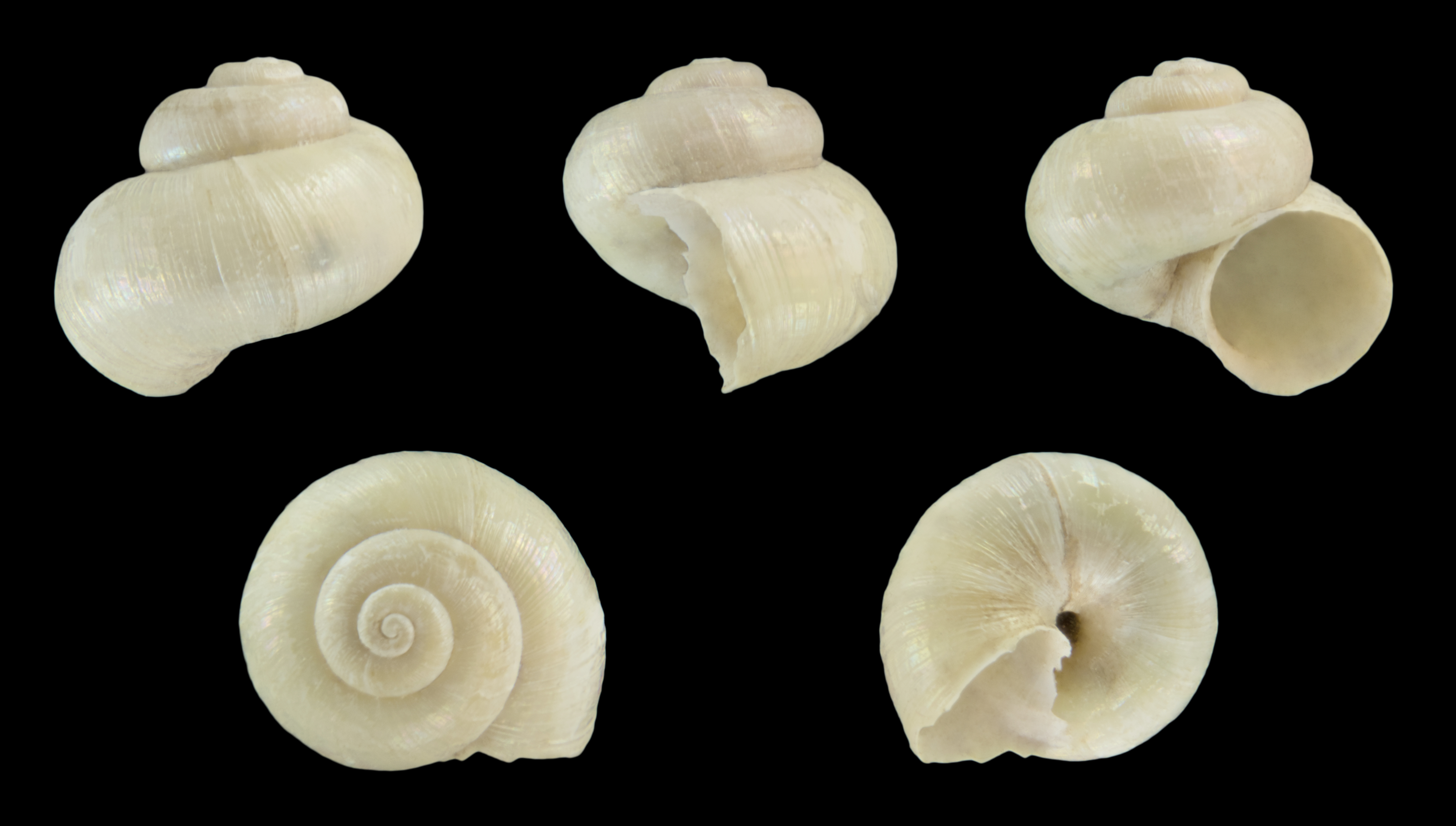
Photo of a shell of Valvata piscinalis.

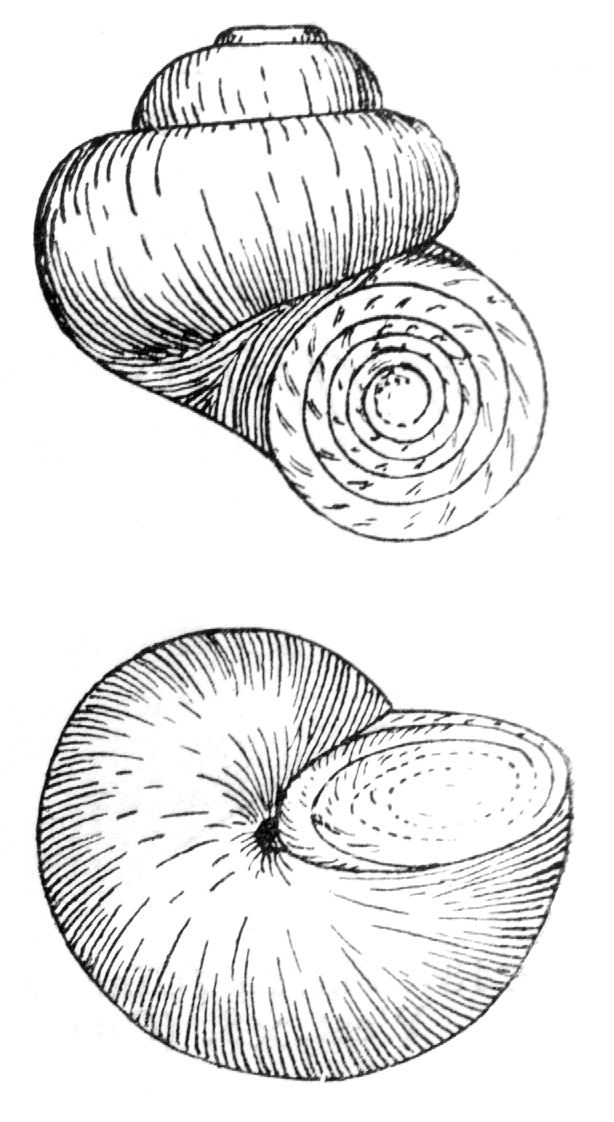
Drawing: two views of a shell of Valvata piscinalis.

The European valve snail can be confused with Valvata sincera, a native species in the Great Lakes; however, the North American species has a more spherical aperture, a wider umbilicus, a conical spire and more widely spaced and rough growth lines on the shell in comparison with the introduced species. In the Great Lakes, introduced mature adult European valve snails are 5 mm high and 3–5 mm wide. In Europe, this snail has been found up to 7 mm high and 6.5 mm wide, but is usually smaller.

Dimensions of the shell are:

- Valvata piscinalis piscinalis - The width of the shell is 4–5 mm. The height of the shell is 3-4.5 mm.
- Valvata piscinalis antiqua - width: 4.5 mm. height: 6 mm.
- Valvata piscinalis geyeri - width: 2.5 mm. height: 3 mm.
- Valvata piscinalis discors - width: 3 mm. height: 3 mm.
- Valvata piscinalis alpestris - width: 6.3 mm. height: 5.5 mm.

== Anatomy ==
The animals are yellow colored, spotted grey and white, with darker pigmentation on the snout, mantle and base of the penis. Blue eyes are at the base of long tentacles. Valvatids all exhibit an external bipectinate ctenidium (respiratory organ) which is visible as the animal moves around.

== Distribution ==
The distribution of Valvata piscinalis is Palearctic.

Although this species is widely distributed in some areas in North America as an introduced species, Valvata piscinalis has declined in some parts of its native distribution, and in some areas it is endangered.

=== Indigenous distribution ===
This species occurs in the British Isles and throughout Europe, to Asia Minor and all the way to Tibet.

The European valve snail is native to Europe, the Caucasus, western Siberia and Central Asia and is common in many freshwater environments therein. It is entirely absent from Iceland.

Europe:

- Austria - endangered (3, gefährdet)
- Croatia
- Czech Republic - near threatened (NT), in Bohemia and Moravia
- Slovakia
- Poland
- Germany - (Arten der Vorwarnliste): critically endangered (2, stark gefährdet) in Saxony and in Thuringia, endangered (3, gefährdet) in Berlin, (4R, rückläufig) in Bavaria, species with limited distribution in Brandenburg, (Arten der Vorwarnliste) in Hesse and in North Rhine-Westphalia. In other federal states of Germany the species is common.
- Netherlands
- the British Isles: Great Britain and Ireland
- Sweden - not in red list

Asia:

- India

=== Nonindigenous distribution ===
Valvata piscinalis is an introduced species in the United States. The European valve snail was originally introduced to Lake Ontario at the mouth of the Genesee River in 1897. In forty years it dispersed to Lake Erie and subsequently it expanded its range to the Saint Lawrence River, the Hudson River, Champlain Lake and Cayuga Lake. Valvata piscinalis was recorded in the 1990s and the first decade of the 21st century in Superior Bay in Lake Superior (Minnesota), Lake Michigan (Wisconsin) and Oneida Lake in the Lake Ontario watershed (New York State).

== Ecology ==
=== Habitat ===
This small snail is found in freshwater streams, rivers, and lakes, preferring running water and tolerating water with low calcium levels.

In its native range, this species' presence has been associated with oligotrophic nearshore zones, clear-water habitats more than turbid water, sparsely vegetated lakes or sites dominated by Chara spp. and Potamogeton spp., littoral habitats with high siltation rates, lentic and stagnant waters or slow streams, fine substrates (mud, silt and sand) – especially during hibernation, and aquatic macrophytes – for laying its egg masses.

The snail appears to be somewhat resistant to declines in macrophyte cover, because populations have been recorded to survive in ponds after vegetation cover almost completely disappeared. This species is found at depths anywhere from 0.5 m to 23 m in the Great Lakes. In Europe, it usually is found in depths of up to 10 m.

Valvata piscinalis tolerates varying calcium concentrations, and generally does not require very high temperatures to survive. Individuals can overwinter in mud, often experiencing growth during this cold period, although some populations may experience mortality in frozen littoral zones. This species can tolerate salinities up to 0.2% and is distributed in northern parts of the Curonian Lagoon, where it experiences periodic intrusions of saline water for a few hours or days at a time.

=== Feeding habits ===
The species is an efficient feeder, grazing on epiphytic algae and detritus, and in more eutrophic environments is capable of filter feeding on suspended organic matter and algae. Valvata piscinalis can also rasp off pieces of aquatic vegetation.

=== Life cycle ===
Valvata piscinalis is known for its rapid growth and high fecundity. It reproduces as a hermaphrodite, one individual acting as the male and the other as the female, and has no free larval stage. It may spawn 2 or 3 times in a year, laying up to 150 eggs at a time which are deposited on vegetation. Hatching normally occurs in 15–30 days. Individuals breed around the age of 1 and usually die at 13–21 months. In Europe, breeding occurs from April to September, occurring later at more northerly latitudes. Myzyk (2007) described life cycle of Valvata piscinalis.

=== Parasites ===
Valvata piscinalis is a common first intermediate host for the parasitic trematode Echinoparyphium recurvatum and has also been shown to act as the first and second intermediate hosts to Echinoparyphium mordwilokoi in native environments in Europe.

- As second intermediate host for Cyanthocotyle bushiensis
- As intermediate host for Syngamus trachea

=== Other interspecific relationships ===
This snail has chemosensory perception, which allows it to detect nearby leeches, and distinguish molluscivores from non-molluscivores, and thus it can close its operculum to avoid predation.
