= Xeropsamobeus acerbus =

Scientific classification
- Kingdom: Animalia
- Phylum: Arthropoda
- Clade: Pancrustacea
- Class: Insecta
- Order: Coleoptera
- Suborder: Polyphaga
- Infraorder: Scarabaeiformia
- Family: Scarabaeidae
- Genus: Xeropsamobeus
- Species: X. acerbus

Binomial name
- Xeropsamobeus acerbus (Horn, 1887)

Synonyms
- Aphodius acerbus Horn, 1887

Species of beetle

Xeropsamobeus acerbus is a species of aphodiine dung beetle in the family Scarabaeidae. It is only known from Texas (Southern United States), although it is likely that its true range extends into Louisiana. It is associated with the Texas leafcutter ant (Atta texana).

Xeropsamobeus acerbus measure about 3 mm (0.12 in) in length.
