= Minidoka National Wildlife Refuge =

Protected area in Idaho, United States

- IUCN category IV (habitat/species management area)
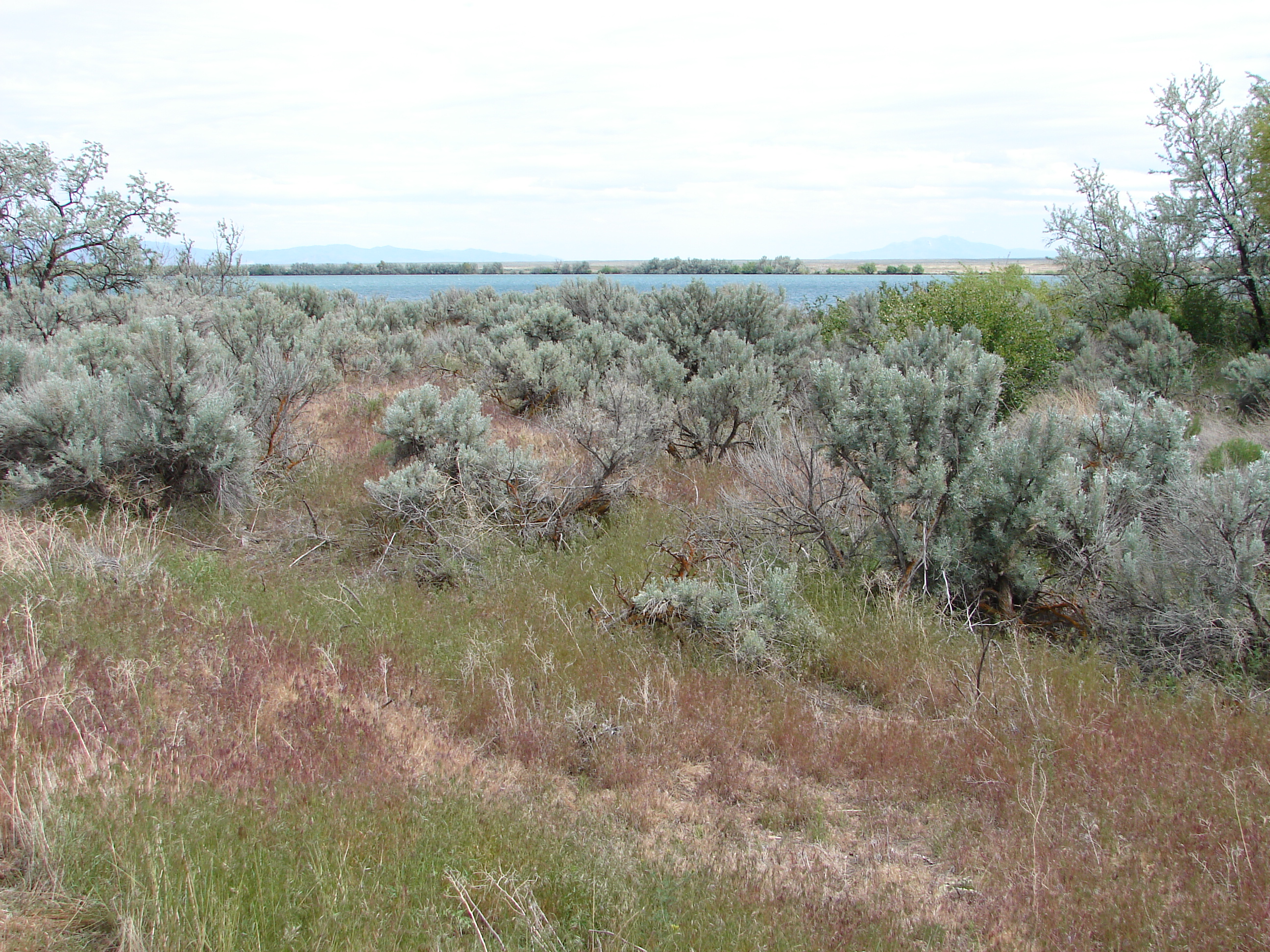
- Minidoka National Wildlife Refuge

- Location within the United States
- Location: Blaine County, Cassia County, Minidoka County, Power County, Idaho, United States
- Nearest city: Rupert, Idaho
- Coordinates: 42°40′13″N 113°23′22″W
- Area: 20,751 acres (83.98 km^{2})
- Established: 1909
- Governing body: U.S. Fish and Wildlife Service
- Website: Minidoka National Wildlife Refuge

Minidoka National Wildlife Refuge is located on the Snake River Plain in south-central Idaho, 12 miles (19 km) northeast of Rupert. It includes about 80 miles (130 km) of shoreline around Lake Walcott, from Minidoka Dam upstream about 25 miles (40 km).

== Fauna ==
Mule deer are commonly seen near the headquarters. Pronghorn roam in the open sagebrush areas in this refuge. Other mammal species including beaver, cottontail rabbit, porcupine, raccoon, coyote, thirteen species of bats, as well as other mammals are present in this refuge. Less common mammal species include cougar, bobcat, river otter, elk and moose.

== Geography ==
About half of the refuge's acreage is open water and wetlands. In this arid landscape, these resources serve as an oasis drawing numerous wildlife species from miles around. Many species use the bulrush and cattail habitat that lines the lake's small bays. Others use the willows, cottonwoods and other trees growing near shorelines. The rest of the refuge is low, rolling uplands covered by sagebrush, grasses, and isolated juniper patches among scattered outcrops of basalt. The refuge has a surface area of 20,751 acres (83.98 km^{2}).

== Climate ==
The climate is semi-arid with about 11 inches (28 cm) of precipitation per year, much of it falling as snow during the winter. Summers are hot and dry with highly variable rain during thunderstorms. Winters are generally moderate but windy. The elevation is about 4,200 feet (1,300 m).

== Habitats ==
Undisturbed habitats are critical to colonial nesting birds, especially American white pelican, and molting waterfowl. Nowhere else in southeastern Idaho can such habitat be found in this quantity or quality. The refuge uplands are a mix of rock, sand, and shallow soil habitat that supports a diversity of small mammals, reptiles, and invertebrates. The basalt lava flows provide habitat for some of the more diverse reptile fauna in Idaho.

The Idaho dunes tiger beetle (Cicindela arenicola), a species of special concern, is found on refuge sand dunes, while the Utah valvata, an endangered snail, inhabits the reservoir. Both sage and sharptailed grouse occupy refuge habitat that is becoming increasingly important in the face of petitions to list these species.

== History ==
More than 100 years ago, settlers on the Oregon Trail passed just south of the refuge; some crossed on an alternate route through the refuge. Today, thousands of visitors come to Lake Walcott State Park, located within the boundary of Minidoka Refuge, to camp, picnic, hike, observe wildlife, hunt waterfowl, boat, and fish. Sensitive wildlife areas are closed to recreational use.
