= Lake Walcott =

Reservoir in the US state of Idaho

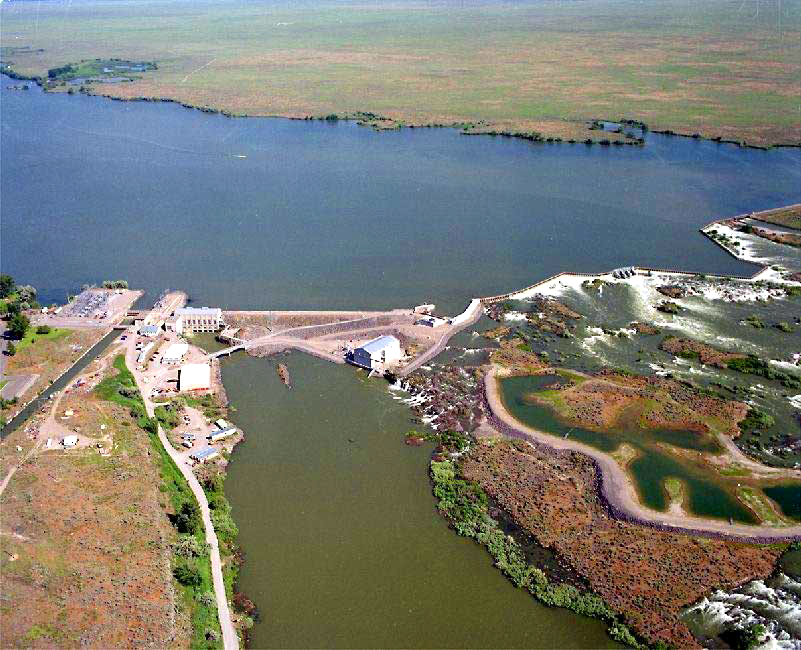
- Aerial view of the dam and lake

- Location within Idaho Location within the United States
- Location: Blaine / Cassia / Minidoka / Power counties, Idaho, US
- Coordinates: 42°40′N 113°24′W
- Type: reservoir
- Primary inflows: Snake River
- Primary outflows: Snake River
- Basin countries: United States
- Max. length: 25 m (82 ft)
- Surface area: 11,000 acres (4,500 ha)
- Water volume: 210,000 acre⋅ft (0.26 km^{3})
- Shore length^{1}: 80 mi (130 km)
- Surface elevation: 4,199 ft (1,280 m)
- Islands: Bird Island
- Settlements: Minidoka, Idaho
- ^{1} Shore length is not a well-defined measure.

Lake Walcott is a reservoir in south central Idaho in the northwestern United States, impounded by Minidoka Dam. The damming of the Snake River by the Minidoka Project formed the 11,000 acre (45 km^{2}) lake beginning in 1909. Bird Island is an island in the lake. The Idaho parks and recreation website lists many activities including fishing, boating, camping and swimming. The Minidoka National Wildlife Refuge and Lake Walcott State Park adjoin the lake and are major attractions in the region.
