= Xeropsamobeus desertus =

Scientific classification
- Kingdom: Animalia
- Phylum: Arthropoda
- Clade: Pancrustacea
- Class: Insecta
- Order: Coleoptera
- Suborder: Polyphaga
- Infraorder: Scarabaeiformia
- Family: Scarabaeidae
- Genus: Xeropsamobeus
- Species: X. desertus

Binomial name
- Xeropsamobeus desertus (Van Dyke, 1918)

Synonyms
- Psammodius desertus Van Dyke, 1918

Species of beetle

Xeropsamobeus desertus is a species of aphodiine dung beetle in the family Scarabaeidae. It is found in the United States (Arizona, California) and Mexico (Baja California, Sonora).

== Description ==
Adults reach a length of about 3.5–4 mm (0.14–0.16 in). They have an oblong-oval, convex, strongly shiny, glabrous, reddish-piceous body. The frontal suture and disc of the pronotum are dark piceous and the elytra are pale testaceous with brownish suture. The antennae are brownish and the legs are reddish-testaceous.
