= Valvata studeri =

Conservation status
- Least Concern (IUCN 3.1)

Scientific classification
- Kingdom: Animalia
- Phylum: Mollusca
- Class: Gastropoda
- Family: Valvatidae
- Genus: Valvata
- Species: V. studeri

Binomial name
- Valvata studeri Boeters & Falkner, 1998

Species of gastropod

Valvata studeri is a species of small freshwater snail with an operculum, an aquatic gastropod mollusk in the family Valvatidae, the valve snails.

== Distribution and conservation status ==
This species occurs in:

- Germany - critically endangered (vom Aussterben bedroht)
