= Minidoka Dam =

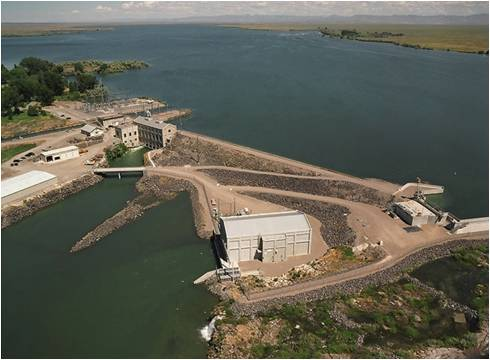
- Minidoka Dam and Lake Walcott

- Location in the United States Location in Idaho
- Country: United States
- Location: Cassia / Minidoka counties, Idaho
- Coordinates: 42°40′10″N 113°29′01″W
- Construction began: 1904
- Opening date: 1906; 120 years ago
- Operator: U.S. Bureau of Reclamation

Dam and spillways
- Impounds: Snake River
- Height: 86 feet (26 m)
- Length: 4,475 feet (1,364 m)
- Spillway type: Gated and flashboard section
- Spillway capacity: 40,800 cu ft/s (1,160 m^{3}/s)

Reservoir
- Creates: Lake Walcott
- Total capacity: 210,200 acre-feet (0.2593 km^{3})
- Catchment area: 2,231 sq mi (5,780 km^{2})
- Normal elevation: 4,245 feet (1,294 m)

Power Station
- Hydraulic head: 74 ft (23 m)
- Turbines: 2 X 10 MW Kaplan horizontal turbines (Units 8, 9); 3 and 5.5 MW Francis turbines (Units 6 and 7), Units 1-5 retired
- Installed capacity: 28 MW
- Minidoka Dam and Power Plant
- U.S. National Register of Historic Places
- Area: 640 acres (260 ha)
- Built: 1904
- NRHP reference No.: 74000746
- Added to NRHP: October 29, 1974

The Minidoka Dam is an earthfill dam in the western United States, on the Snake River in south central Idaho. Completed in 1906, the dam is east of Rupert on county highway 400; it is 86 feet (26 m) high and nearly a mile (1.6 km) in length, with a 2,400-foot (730 m) wide overflow spillway section.

Minidoka Dam and power plant were listed on the National Register of Historic Places in 1974. Walcott Park, close to the dam, is a popular summertime picnic area. Lake Walcott State Park and the headquarters for the Minidoka National Wildlife Refuge are adjacent to the dam.

== History ==
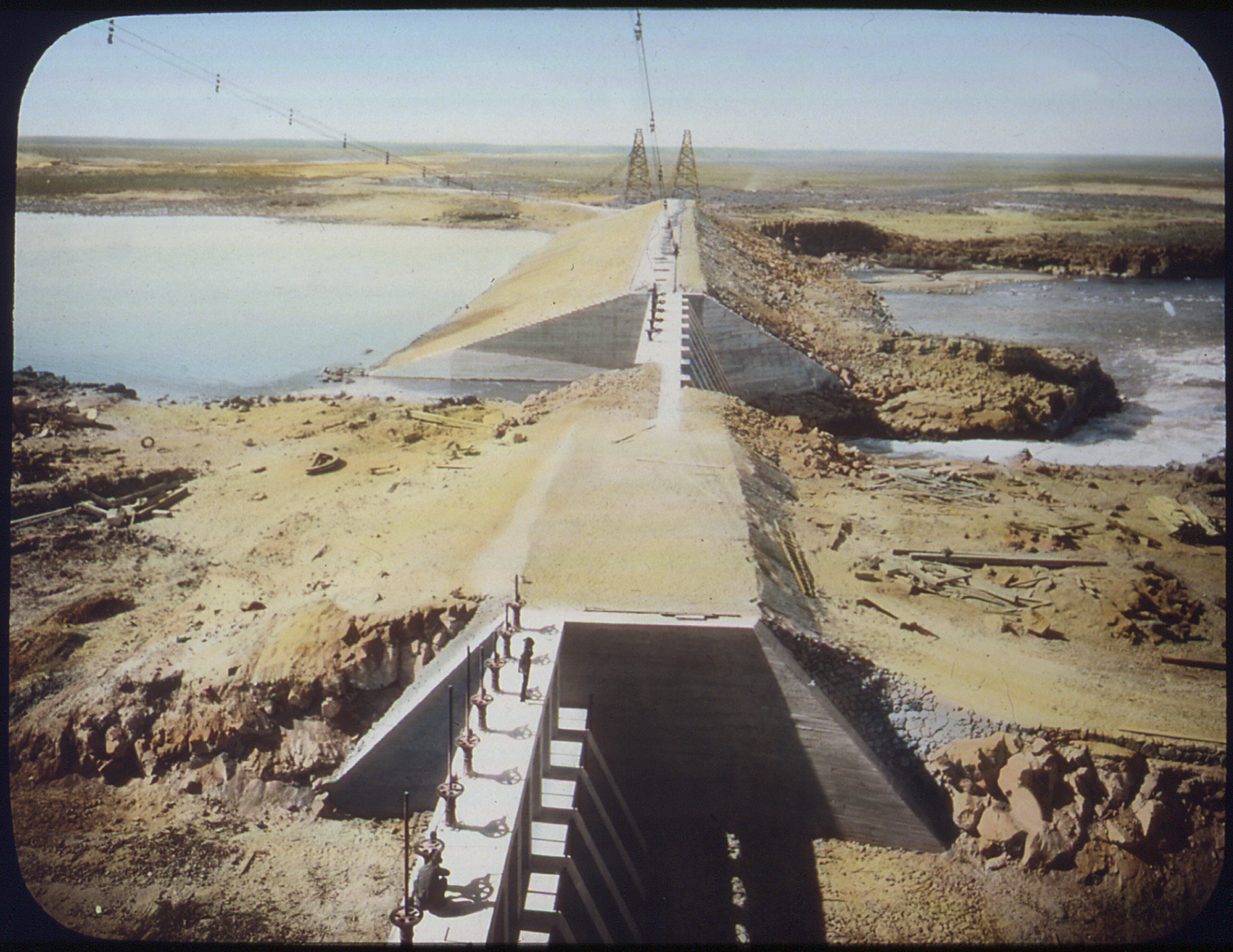
Minidoka Project (1904)

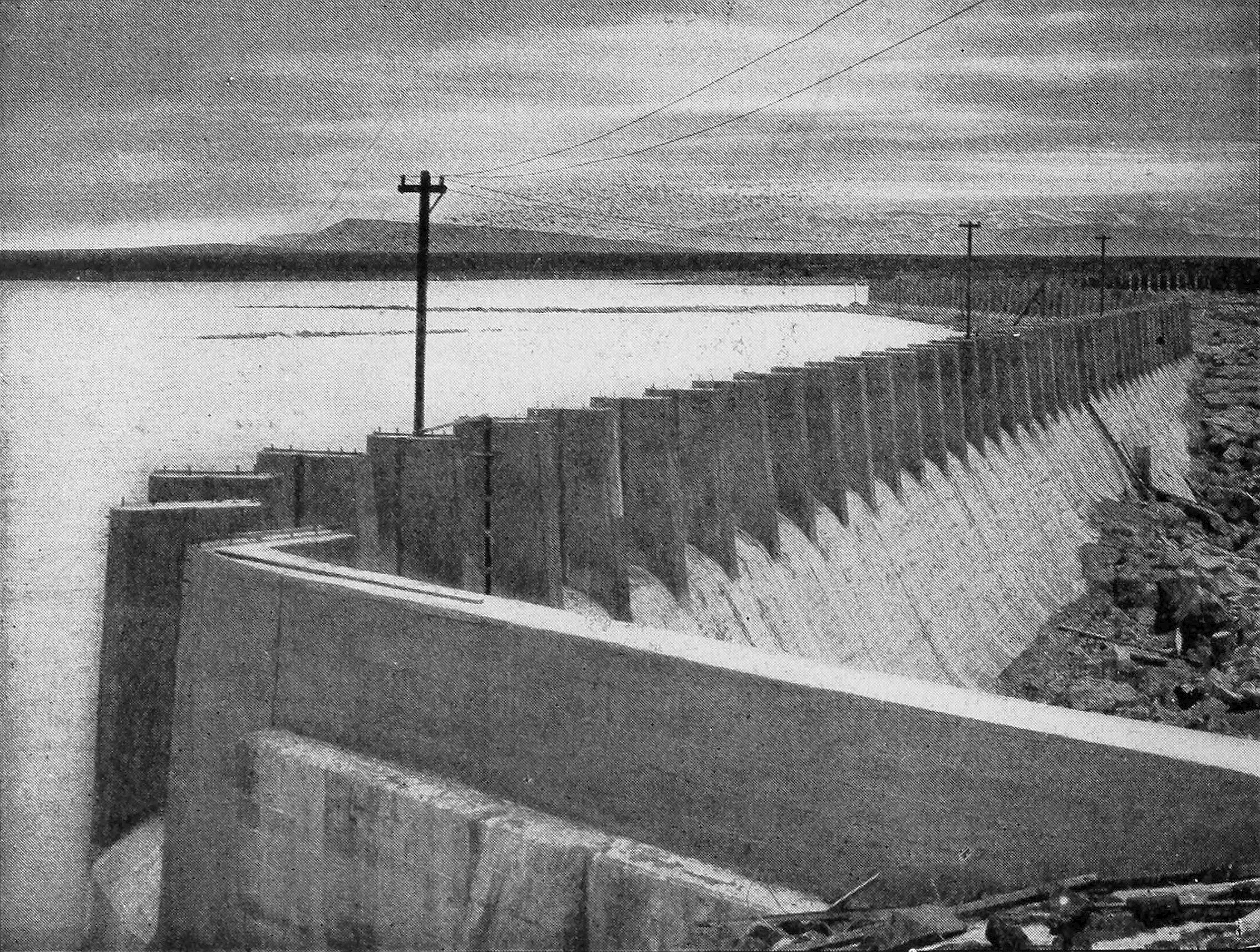
Minidoka Dam, 1911

The Minidoka dam was the first Reclamation Service project in Idaho, part of the Minidoka Project of dams, reservoirs and canals. Construction began in 1904 and by 1906 most of the dam's canals and laterals were finished. By 1909, Minidoka Dam's power plant, the first federal power plant in the northwest, was completed. By its completion, the total cost of the dam was $5.8 million, which exceeded estimates. The Minidoka project brought water into the southeastern areas of Idaho near the cities of Rupert and Burley. The project was successful, as what was once an uninhabited sagebrush desert is now bountiful farmland. The powerplant installation was significant as a precursor of much larger projects on the Columbia River, including Bonneville Dam.

A study examining the possibility of raising the crest of the dam by 5 feet (1.5 m) was conducted from 2000 to 2009, but with costs ranging from $150 million to $205 million the project has not been pursued. A $50 million spillway repair project is expected to go ahead.

== Power plant ==
The Minidoka Dam was initially designed and constructed without power generation facilities, but the Minidoka power plant was soon added in 1909-1910. It was designed to generate electricity for pumping operations to support irrigation on the south bank of the Snake River. While irrigation water could flow by gravity to the north bank, water for the south bank had to be raised to a higher elevation. Units 1-5 generated power using propeller-style units., but did not efficiently use the water volume passing through the dam. Unit 6, a 3MW unit with a Francis turbine, was added in 1927, with the 5.5 MW Unit 7 added in 1942. Units 1 - 5 were retired in 1995, before the construction of the Allen E. Inman Powerplant in 1997. The new plant houses Unit 8 and 9, each with a 10MW Kaplan horizontal unit. The original plant housing Units 1 -5 has been preserved and is listed on the National Register of Historic Places.

Excess power from the original powerplant was sold to local farmers, making the Minidoka area one of the first rural areas to have an electric power distribution system.

== Statistics ==
- Provides supplemental water supply to more than 1 million acres (4000 km²) of land.
- The reservoir has a storage capacity of 210,000 acre-feet (260,000,000 m^{3}).
- The reservoir, Lake Walcott, is named after a Bureau of Reclamation engineer.
- The reservoir extends 26 miles (42 km) up the Snake River and has a shoreline of 80 miles (130 km).

== See also ==
- List of dams in the Columbia River watershed
