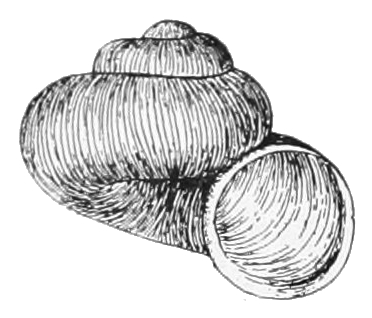
- Apertural view of a shell of Valvata sincera
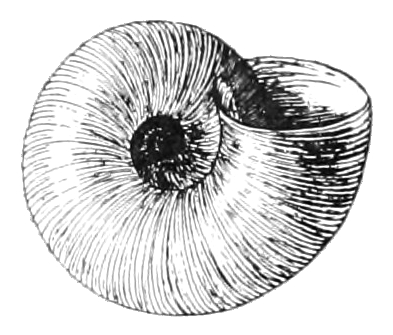
- Basal view of a shell of Valvata sincera

Conservation status
- Least Concern (IUCN 3.1)

- Secure (NatureServe)

Scientific classification
- Kingdom: Animalia
- Phylum: Mollusca
- Class: Gastropoda
- Family: Valvatidae
- Genus: Valvata
- Species: V. sincera

Binomial name
- Valvata sincera Say, 1824

Subspecies
- Valvata sincera sincera; Valvata sincera helicoidea; Valvata sincera ontariensis

Synonyms
- Valvata sincera var. danielsi Walker, 1906; Valvata sincera var. illinoisensis Baker, 1930

= Valvata sincera =

Species of gastropod

Valvata sincera, common name the mossy valvata is a species of small freshwater snail with a gill and an operculum, an aquatic gastropod mollusc in the family Valvatidae, the valve snails.

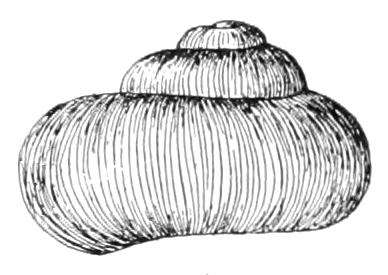
Side view of the shell of Valvata sincera
