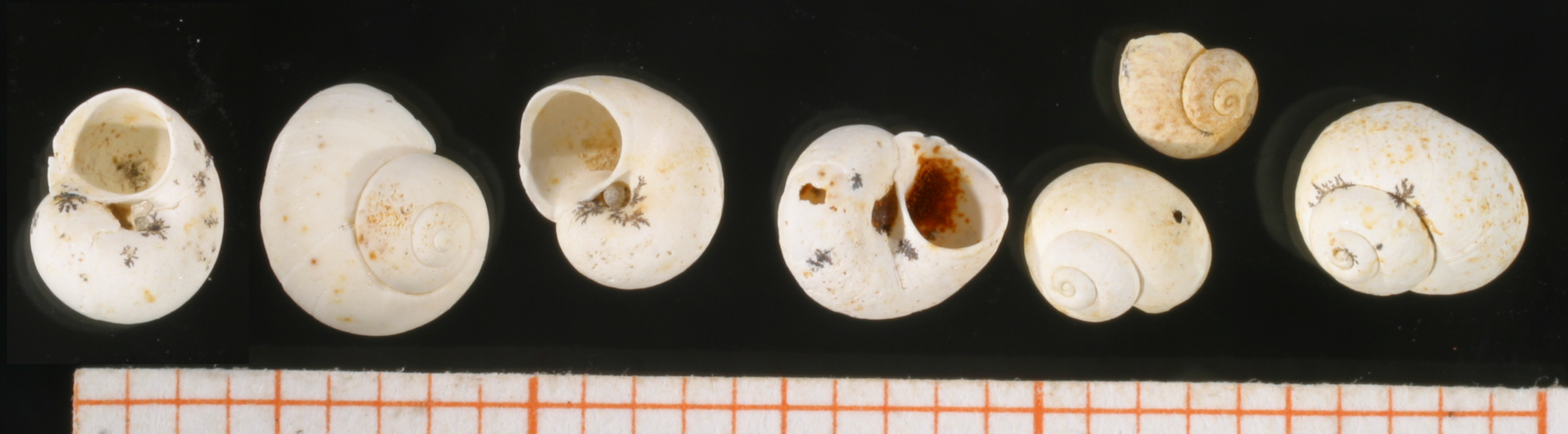
- Subfossil shells of Borysthenia naticina

Scientific classification
- Kingdom: Animalia
- Phylum: Mollusca
- Class: Gastropoda
- Family: Valvatidae
- Genus: Borysthenia; Lindholm, 1913

= Borysthenia =

Borysthenia Temporal range: at least from Middle Pleistocene-Recent

Genus of gastropods

Borysthenia is a genus of small freshwater snails with an operculum, aquatic gastropod mollusks in the family Valvatidae, the valve snails.

The aperture of Borysthenia is not circular. Animals are ovoviviparous.

== Species ==
The genus Borysthenia contains the following species:

- † Borysthenia goldfussiana (Wüst, 1901)
- † Borysthenia intermedia Kondrashov, 2007 - from the Middle Pleistocene of Oka-Don Plain
- Borysthenia menkeana (Jelski, 1863)
- Borysthenia naticina (Menke, 1845) - type species as Valvata jelskii Crosse, 1863
