= Nomen novum =

New replacement name used in biological nomenclature

In biological nomenclature, a nomen novum (Latin for "new name"), replacement name (or new replacement name, new substitute name, substitute name) is a replacement scientific name that is created when technical, nomenclatural reasons have made it impossible to continue using the previous name (for example because it was discovered to be a homonym – spelled the same as an existing, older name). Nomen novum does not apply when a name is changed for taxonomic reasons alone. It is frequently abbreviated, e.g. nomen nov., nom. nov..

== Zoology ==
In zoology establishing a new replacement name is a nomenclatural act and it must be expressly proposed to substitute a previously established and available name.

Often, the older name cannot be used because another animal was described earlier with exactly the same name. For example, Lindholm discovered in 1913 that a generic name Jelskia established by Bourguignat in 1877 for a European freshwater snail could not be used because another author Taczanowski had proposed the same name in 1871 for a spider. So Lindholm proposed a new replacement name Borysthenia. This is an objective synonym of Jelskia Bourguignat, 1877, because he has the same type species, and is used today as Borysthenia.

Also, for names of species new replacement names are often necessary. New replacement names have been proposed since more than 100 years ago. In 1859 Bourguignat saw that the name Bulimus cinereus Mortillet, 1851 for an Italian snail could not be used because Reeve had proposed exactly the same name in 1848 for a completely different Bolivian snail. Since it was understood even then that the older name always has priority, Bourguignat proposed a new replacement name Bulimus psarolenus, and also added a note why this was necessary. The Italian snail is known until today under the name Solatopupa psarolena (Bourguignat, 1859).

A new replacement name must obey certain rules; not all of these are well known.

Not every author who proposes a name for a species that already has another name, establishes a new replacement name. An author who writes "The name of the insect species with the green wings shall be named X, this is the one that the other author has named Y", does not establish a new replacement name (but a regular new name).

The International Code of Zoological Nomenclature prescribes that for a new replacement name, an expressed statement must be given by the author, which means an explicit statement concerning the process of replacing the previous name. It is not necessary to employ the term nomen novum, but something must be expressed concerning the act of substituting a name. Implicit evidence ("everybody knows why the author used that new name") is not allowed at this occasion. Many zoologists do not know that this expressed statement is necessary, and therefore a variety of names are regarded as having been established as new replacement names (often including names that were mentioned without any description, which is fundamentally contrary to the rules).

The author who proposes a new replacement name must state exactly which name shall be replaced. It is not possible to mention three available synonyms at once to be replaced. Usually, the author explains why the new replacement name is needed.

Sometimes we read "the species cannot keep this old name P. brasiliensis, because it does not live in Brazil, so I propose a new name P. angolana". Even though this would not justify a new replacement name under the Code's rules, the author believed that a new name was necessary and gave an expressed statement concerning the act of replacing. So the name P. angolana was made available at this occasion, and is an objective synonym of P. brasiliensis.

A new replacement name can only be used for a taxon if the name that it replaces cannot be used, as in the example above with the snail and the spider, or in the other example with the Italian and the Bolivian snail. The animal from Angola must keep its name brasiliensis, because this is the older name.

New replacement names do not occur very frequently, but they are not extremely rare. About 1% of the currently used zoological names might be new replacement names. There are no exact statistics covering all animal groups. In 2,200 names of species and 350 names of genera in European non-marine molluscs, which might be a representative group of animals, 0.7% of the specific and 3.4% of the generic names were correctly established as new replacement names (and a further 0.7% of the specific and 1.7% of the generic names have incorrectly been regarded as new replacement names by some authors).

== Algae, fungi and plants ==
For those taxa whose names are regulated by the International Code of Nomenclature for algae, fungi, and plants (ICNafp), a nomen novum or replacement name is a name published as a substitute for "a legitimate or illegitimate, previously published name, which is its replaced synonym and which, when legitimate, does not provide the final epithet, name, or stem of the replacement name". For species, replacement names may be needed because the specific epithet is not available in the genus for whatever reason. Examples:

- Carl Linnaeus gave the herb rosemary the scientific name Rosmarinus officinalis in 1753. It is now regarded as one of many species in the genus Salvia. It cannot be transferred to this genus as "Salvia officinalis" because Linnaeus gave this name to the herb sage. An acceptable name in the genus Salvia was published by Fridolin Spenner in 1835. The replacement name is cited as Salvia rosmarinus Spenn.; the replaced synonym is Rosmarinus officinalis L. The author of the replaced synonym is not included in the citation of the replacement name.
- The plant name Polygonum persicaria was published by Linnaeus in 1753. In 1821, Samuel Gray transferred the species to the genus Persicaria. He could not do this using the name "Persicaria persicaria" because the ICNafp does not allow tautonyms. Accordingly, he published the replacement name Persicaria maculosa. The replacement name is Persicaria maculosa Gray; the replaced synonym is Polygonum persicaria L. Again, the author of the replaced synonym is not included in the citation of the replacement name.
- The fungus name Marasmius distantifolius was published by Y.S. Tan and Desjardin in 2009. Later it was discovered that this combination had already been used for a different species by William Murrill in 1915, so Tan and Desjardin's name was an illegitimate later homonym. Accordingly, in 2010 Mešić and Tkalčec published the replacement name Marasmius asiaticus for the species. The replacement name is cited as Marasmius asiaticus Mešić & Tkalčec; the replaced synonym as Marasmius distantifolius Y.S. Tan & Desjardin. In this example, the replaced synonym is illegitimate.
- The plant name Lycopodium densum was published by Jacques Labillardière in 1807. However, the combination had already been used for a different species by Jean-Baptiste Lamarck in 1779, so Labillardière's name is illegitimate. Werner Rothmaler knew this when in 1944 he transferred the species to the genus Lepidotis, and so explicitly published Lepidotis densa as a new name ("nom. nov.", "neuer Name"). The replacement name is Lepidotis densa Rothm.; the replaced synonym is Lycopodium densum Labill. Even though the specific epithet in Lepidotis appears to be the same, it is nevertheless new. So when in 1983, Josef Holub transferred the species to Pseudolycopodium, the name in that genus is cited as Pseudolycopodium densum (Rothm.) Holub., the basionym being the replacement name Lepidotis densa Rothm. not the illegitimate replaced synonym Lycopodium densum Labill.

== See also ==
- Glossary of scientific naming
- Nomen dubium
- Nomen conservandum
- Nomen nudum
- Nomen oblitum
