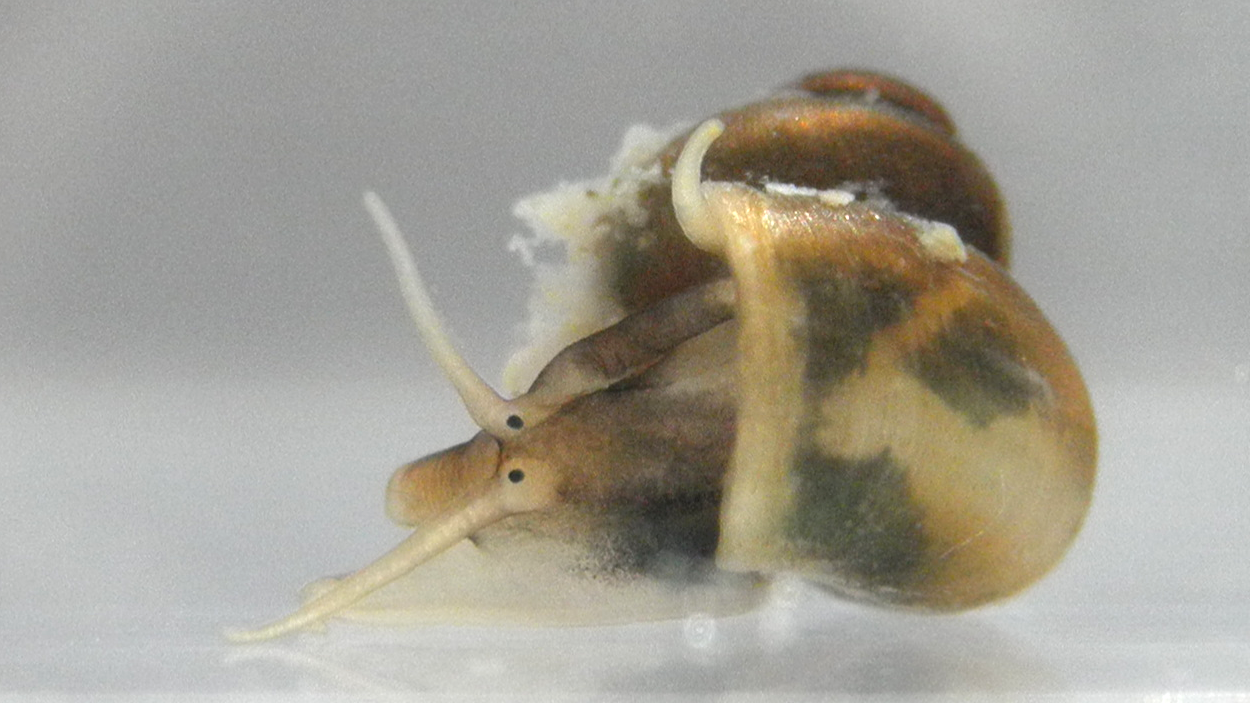
- a live Valvata piscinalis
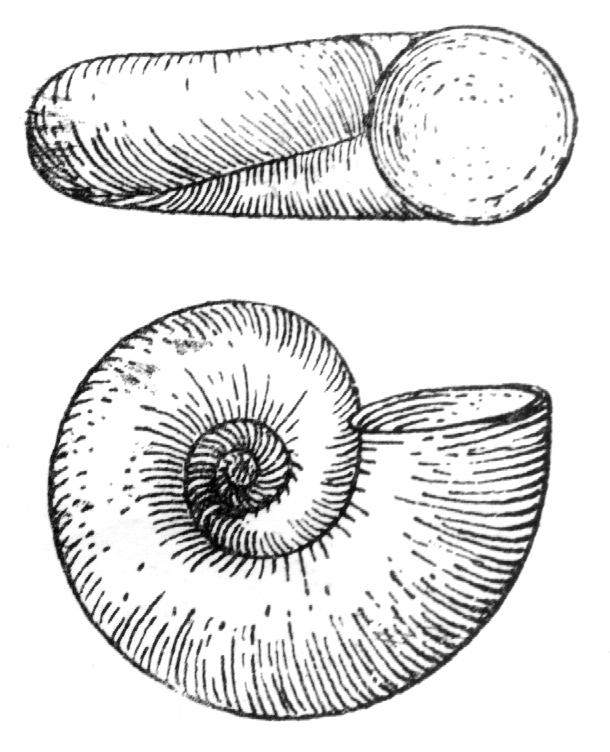
- Drawing of apertural and umbilical views of a shell of Valvata cristata.

Scientific classification
- Kingdom: Animalia
- Phylum: Mollusca
- Class: Gastropoda
- Superfamily: Valvatoidea
- Family: Valvatidae; J. E. Gray, 1840

Diversity
- 71 freshwater species

Synonyms
- Borystheniinae Starobogatov, 1983

= Valvatidae =

Family of gastropods

Valvatidae, the valve snails, is a taxonomic family of very small freshwater snails with an operculum, aquatic gastropod mollusks.

== Taxonomy ==
The family Valvatidae has no subfamilies (according to the taxonomy of the Gastropoda by Bouchet & Rocroi, 2005).

== Genera ==
The type genus of this family is Valvata O.F. Müller, 1774.

Genera in the family Valvatidae include:

- Andrussovia Brusina, 1903
- Borysthenia Lindholm, 1933
- Costovalvata Polinski, 1932
- Liratina Lindholm, 1906
- Megalovalvata Lindholm, 1906
- Valvata Müller, 1774
  - Cincinna Hübner, 1810 - It is recognized either as genus of a subgenus of Valvata.

== Ecology ==
Snails in the family Valvatidae are useful for measuring water quality as biological indicators. According to the Biological monitoring working party they have a score of 3, which means that they have quite a high tolerance to pollutants.
