= List of non-marine molluscs of Sweden =

Non-marine molluscs of Sweden

Location of Sweden

The non-marine molluscs of Sweden are a part of the molluscan fauna of Sweden (wildlife of Sweden).

There are unknown species of gastropods (52 species of freshwater gastropods, unknown species of land gastropods) and 32 species of bivalves living in the wild—84 species of freshwater molluscs altogether.

Summary table of the number of species:
Numbers of molluscs by habitat	Number of species
Freshwater gastropods	52
Land gastropods	??? (22 species of slugs)
Total number of non-marine gastropods	???
Freshwater bivalves	32
Total number of non-marine molluscs	???

== Freshwater gastropods ==
Freshwater gastropods in Sweden include:

Neritidae

- Theodoxus fluviatilis (Linnaeus, 1758)

Viviparidae

- Viviparus contectus (Millet, 1813)
- Viviparus viviparus (Linnaeus, 1758)

Thiaridae

- Melanoides tuberculata (O. F. Müller, 1774) - non-indigenous

Bithyniidae

- Bithynia tentaculata (Linnaeus, 1758)
- Bithynia leachii (Sheppard, 1823)
- Bithynia transsilvanica (E. A. Bielz, 1853) - regionally extinct in Sweden

Hydrobiidae

- Potamopyrgus antipodarum (J. E. Gray, 1843) - non-indigenous
- Hydrobia ventrosa (Montagu, 1803)
- Hydrobia ulvae (Pennant, 1777)
- Hydrobia neglecta Muus, 1963

Amnicolidae

- Marstoniopsis scholtzi (A. Schmidt, 1856)

Valvatidae

- Valvata cristata O. F. Müller, 1774
- Valvata macrostoma Mörch, 1864 - Near Threatened in Sweden
- Valvata sibirica Middendorff, 1851 - Near Threatened in Sweden
- Valvata piscinalis (O. F. Müller, 1774)

Acroloxidae

- Acroloxus lacustris (Linnaeus, 1758)

Lymnaeidae

- Galba truncatula (O. F. Müller, 1774)
- Stagnicola palustris (O. F. Müller, 1774)
- Stagnicola fuscus (C. Pfeiffer, 1821)
- Stagnicola corvus (Gmelin, 1791)
- Omphiscola glabra (O. F. Müller, 1774) - Vulnerable in Sweden
- Radix auricularia (Linnaeus, 1758)
- Radix peregra (O. F. Müller, 1774)
- Radix ovata (Draparnaud, 1805)
- Myxas glutinosa (O. F. Müller, 1774) - Near Threatened in Sweden
- Lymnaea stagnalis (Linnaeus, 1758)
- Pseudosuccinea columella (Say, 1817) - non-indigenous

Physidae

- Physa fontinalis (Linnaeus, 1758)
- Physella acuta (Draparnaud, 1805) - non-indigenous
- Physella heterostropha (Say, 1817) - non-indigenous
- Aplexa hypnorum (Linnaeus, 1758) - Near Threatened in Sweden

Planorbidae

- Planorbarius corneus (Linnaeus, 1758)
- Planorbella duryi (Wetherby, 1879) - non-indigenous
- Ferrissia clessiniana (Jickeli, 1882) - non-indigenous, synonym: Ferrissia wautieri (Mirolli, 1960)
- Planorbis planorbis (Linnaeus, 1758)
- Planorbis carinatus O. F. Müller, 1774
- Anisus leucostoma (Millet, 1813)
- Anisus spirorbis (Linnaeus, 1758) - Data Deficient
- Anisus vortex (Linnaeus, 1758)
- Anisus vorticulus (Troschel, 1834) - Critically Endangered in Sweden
- Bathyomphalus contortus (Linnaeus, 1758)
- Gyraulus albus (O. F. Müller, 1774)
- Gyraulus acronicus (A. Férussac, 1807)
- Gyraulus chinensis (Dunker, 1848) - non-indigenous
- Gyraulus laevis (Alder, 1838) - Endangered in Sweden
- Gyraulus parvus (Say, 1817) - non-indigenous
- Gyraulus riparius (Westerlund, 1865)
- Gyraulus crista (Linnaeus, 1758)
- Hippeutis complanatus (Linnaeus, 1758)
- Segmentina nitida (O. F. Müller, 1774) - Vulnerable in Sweden
- Ancylus fluviatilis O. F. Müller, 1774

== Land gastropods ==
Land gastropods in Sweden include:

Pupillidae

- Pupilla pratensis (Clessin, 1871)

Punctidae

- Punctum pygmaeum

Vertiginidae

- Vertigo lilljeborgi

Milacidae

- Milax gagates (Draparnaud, 1801)

Vitrinidae

Boettgerillidae

- Boettgerilla pallens Simroth, 1912

Limacidae

- Limax maximus Linnaeus, 1758
- Limax cinereoniger Wolf, 1803
- Limacus flavus (Linnaeus, 1758)
- Malacolimax tenellus (O. F. Müller, 1774)
- Lehmannia marginata (O. F. Müller, 1774)
- Lehmannia valentiana (A. Férussac, 1822)

Agriolimacidae

- Deroceras agreste (Linnaeus, 1758)
- Deroceras laeve (O. F. Müller, 1774)
- Deroceras reticulatum (O. F. Müller, 1774)
- Deroceras sturanyi (Simroth, 1894)
- Deroceras panormitanum (Lessona & Pollonera, 1882)

Arionidae

- Arion rufus (Linnaeus, 1758)
- Arion lusitanicus J. Mabille, 1868
- Arion fuscus (O. F. Müller, 1774)
- Arion circumscriptus Johnston, 1828
- Arion fasciatus (Nilsson, 1823)
- Arion silvaticus Lohmander, 1937
- Arion distinctus J. Mabille, 1868
- Arion intermedius Normand, 1852
- Arion ater

Bradybaenidae

Helicodontidae

Hygromiidae

- Trochulus hispidus (Linnaeus, 1758)

Helicidae

- Cepaea hortensis (O. F. Müller, 1774)
- Cepaea nemoralis (Linnaeus, 1758)

== Freshwater bivalves ==
Freshwater gastropods in Sweden include:

Margaritiferidae

- Margaritifera margaritifera (Linnaeus, 1758) - Vulnerable in Sweden

Unionidae

- Unio pictorum (Linnaeus, 1758)
- Unio tumidus Philipsson, 1788
- Unio crassus Philipsson, 1788 - Endangered in Sweden
- Anodonta anatina (Linnaeus, 1758)
- Anodonta cygnea (Linnaeus, 1758)
- Pseudanodonta complanata (Rossmässler, 1835) - Near Threatened in Sweden

Sphaeriidae

- Sphaerium corneum (Linnaeus, 1758)
- Sphaerium nucleus (S. Studer, 1820)
- Sphaerium nitidum Clessin, 1876
- Musculium lacustre (O. F. Müller, 1774)
- Pisidium amnicum (O. F. Müller, 1774)
- Pisidium dilatatum Westerlund, 1897 - Near Threatened in Sweden, synonym: Pisidium subtilestriatum Lindholm, 1909
- Pisidium casertanum (Poli, 1791)
- Pisidium globulare Clessin, 1873
- Pisidium hinzi Kuiper, 1975 - Vulnerable in Sweden
- Pisidium nitidum Jenyns, 1832
- Pisidium personatum Malm, 1855
- Pisidium conventus Clessin, 1877
- Pisidium obtusale (Lamarck 1818)
- Pisidium henslowanum (Sheppard, 1823)
- Pisidium hibernicum Westerlund, 1894
- Pisidium lilljeborgii Clessin, 1886
- Pisidium supinum A. Schmidt, 1851 - Vulnerable in Sweden
- Pisidium waldeni Kuiper, 1975
- Pisidium tenuilineatum Stelfox, 1918 - Data Deficient
- Pisidium moitessierianum Paladilhe, 1866
- Pisidium subtruncatum Malm, 1855
- Pisidium pulchellum Jenyns, 1832
- Pisidium milium Held, 1836
- Pisidium pseudosphaerium J. Favre, 1927

Dreissenidae

- Dreissena polymorpha (Pallas, 1771) - non-indigenous

== See also ==
Lists of molluscs of surrounding countries:

- List of non-marine molluscs of Norway
- List of non-marine molluscs of Finland
- List of non-marine molluscs of Denmark
- List of non-marine molluscs of Germany
- List of non-marine molluscs of Poland
- List of non-marine molluscs of Kaliningrad Oblast
- List of non-marine molluscs of Lithuania
- List of non-marine molluscs of Latvia
- List of non-marine molluscs of Estonia
