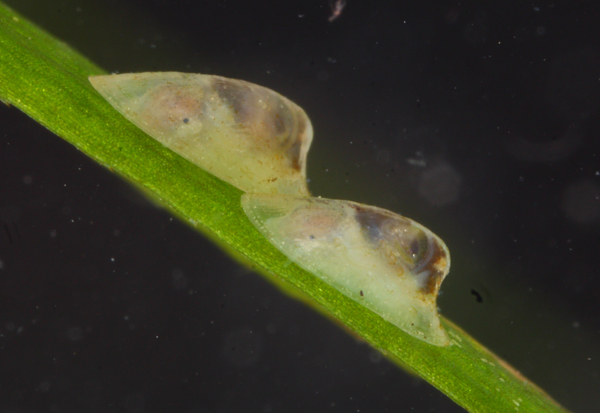
- Shell of Ferissia clessiana

Scientific classification
- Kingdom: Animalia
- Phylum: Mollusca
- Class: Gastropoda
- Superorder: Hygrophila
- Family: Planorbidae
- Subfamily: Ancylinae
- Tribe: Ancylini
- Genus: Ferrissia; Walker, 1903

Type species
- Ancylus rivularis Say, 1817

Synonyms
- Ferrissia (Kincaidilla) Hannibal, 1912 · accepted, alternate representation; Ferrissia (Pettancylus) Iredale, 1943 · accepted, alternate representation

= Ferrissia =

Genus of gastropods

Ferrissia is a genus of small, air-breathing freshwater limpets, aquatic gastropod mollusks in the family Planorbidae.

== Species ==
Species within the genus Ferrissia include:

- Ferrissia baconi (Bourguignat, 1853)
- Ferrissia beaui (Bourguignat, 1853) - Beau's Stream Limpet
- Ferrissia burnupi (Walker, 1912)
- Ferrissia cawstoni Walker, 1924
- Ferrissia ceylanica Benson, 1864
- Ferrissia chudeaui Germain, 1917
- Ferrissia clifdeni Connolly, 1939
- Ferrissia connollyi (Walker, 1912)
- † Ferrissia crenellata Harzhauser & Neubauer in Harzhauser et al., 2012
- † Ferrissia deperdita (Desmarest, 1814)
- † Ferrissia dimici (Brusina, 1902)
- Ferrissia dohrnianus (Clessin, 1882)
- Ferrissia eburnensis Binder, 1957
- Ferrissia farquhari (Walker, 1924)
- Ferrissia fontinalis (Walker, 1912)
- Ferrissia fragilis (Tryon, 1863) - synonyms: Ferrissia clessiniana (Jickeli, 1882), Ferrissia wautieri (Mirolli, 1960) - Fragile Ancylid
- Ferrissia gentilis Lanzer, 1991
- † Ferrissia illyrica (Neumayr, 1880)
- Ferrissia irrorata (Guilding, 1828)
- Ferrissia isseli (Bourguignat, 1866)
- Ferrissia junodi Connolly, 1925
- Ferrissia kavirondica (Mandahl-Barth, 1954)
- Ferrissia lacustris Walker, 1924
- Ferrissia leonensis Connolly, 1928
- Ferrissia lhotelleriei Walker, 1914 - dubious species
- Ferrissia mcneili Walker, 1925 - hood ancylid
- Ferrissia modesta Crosse, 1880
- Ferrissia natalensis Walker, 1924
- Ferrissia neozelanica (Suter, 1905)
- † Ferrissia neumayri (Fontannes, 1881)
- Ferrissia pallaryi Walker, 1914 - dubious species
- Ferrissia parallela (Haldeman) - oblong ancylid or Ferrissia parallelus
- Ferrissia petterdi (Johnston, 1879)
- † Ferrissia pontileviensis (Morgan, 1920)
- Ferrissia siamensis Brandt, 1974
- Ferrissia rivularis (Say, 1817) - the type species
- Ferrissia tasmanica (Woods, 1876)
- Ferrissia tanganyicensis (Smith, 1906)
- Ferrissia tenuis (Bourguignat, 1862)
- Ferrissia toroensis (Mandahl-Barth, 1954)
- † Ferrissia truci Wautier, 1975
- Ferrissia verruca (Benson, 1855)
- Ferrissia victoriensis (Walker, 1912)
- Ferrissia viola (Annandale & Prashad, 1921)
- Ferrissia walkeri (Pilsbry & Ferriss, 1907)
- † Ferrissia wittmanni (Schlickum, 1964)
- Ferrissia zambesiensis (Walker, 1912)
- Ferrissia zambiensis Mandahl-Barth, 1968

Many specific names need revision, for example 11 species of Ferrissia in southern Africa.

Species brought into synonymy

- † Ferrissia senckenbergiana (Boettger, 1877): synonym of † Ferrissia deperdita (Desmarest, 1814)
- Ferrissia wautieri (Mirolli, 1960): synonym of Ferrissia fragilis (Tryon, 1836)
- Ferrissia (Pettancylus) clessiniana (Jickeli, 1882): synonym of Pettancylus clessiniana (Jickeli, 1882)
