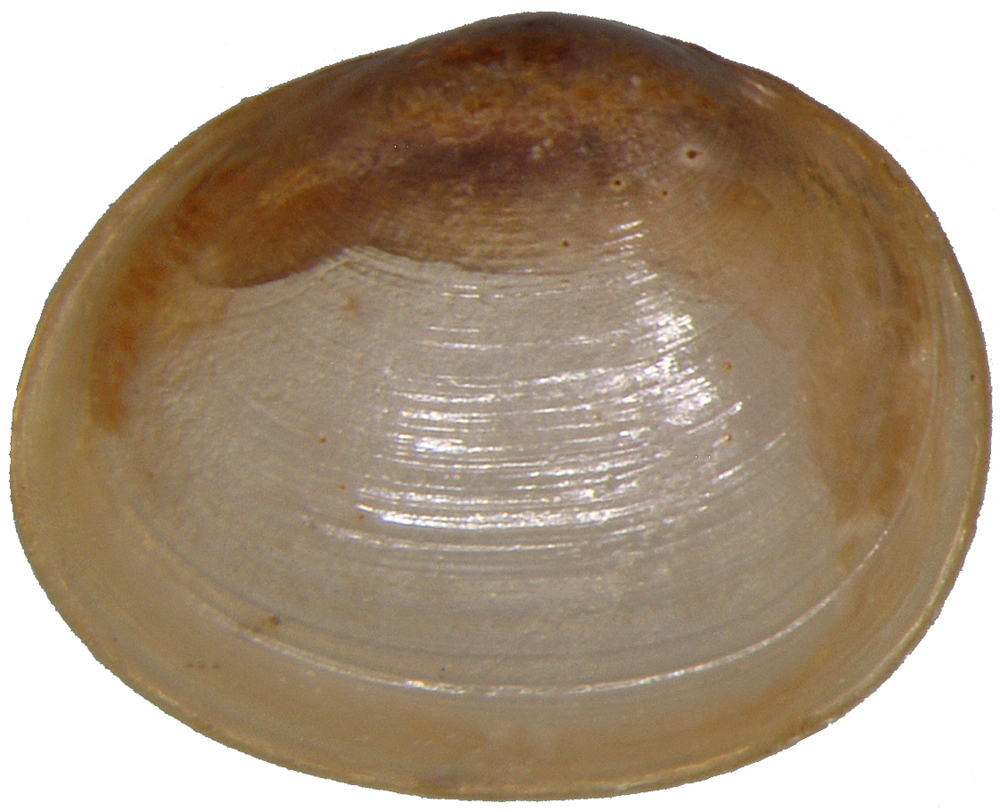
- External view of the left valve of Pisidium pseudosphaerium

Scientific classification
- Kingdom: Animalia
- Phylum: Mollusca
- Class: Bivalvia
- Order: Sphaeriida
- Family: Sphaeriidae
- Genus: Pisidium; C. Pfeiffer, 1821

Type species
- Pisidium amnicum (O. F. Müller, 1774)

Species
- See text

Synonyms
- List: Pisidium (Pisidium) C. Pfeiffer, 1821; Corneocyclas (Pisidium) C. Pfeiffer, 1821; Cyclas (Pisidium) C. Pfeiffer, 1821; Cyrena (Pisidium) C. Pfeiffer, 1821; Pera Leach, 1831; Cordula Leach, 1852; Pisidium (Fluminina) Clessin, 1873; Amniciana Servain, 1888; Pisidium (Amniciana) Servain, 1888; Lacustrina Sterki, 1916; Pisidium (Lacustrina) Sterki, 1916; Pisidium (Parapisidium) Kuiper, 1966; Pisidium (Amuropisidium) Prozorova, 1995

= Pisidium =

Genus of bivalves

Pisidium is a genus of very small or minute freshwater clams known as pill clams or pea clams, aquatic bivalve molluscs in the family Sphaeriidae, the pea clams and fingernail clams.

In some bivalve classification systems, the family Sphaeriidae is referred to as Pisidiidae, and occasionally Pisidium species are grouped in a subfamily known as Pisidiinae.

== Taphonomy ==
In large enough quantities, the minute shells of these bivalves can affect environmental conditions, and this change in conditions can positively affect the ability of organic remains in the immediate environment to fossilize (one aspect of taphonomy). For example, in the Dinosaur Park Formation, the fossil remains of hadrosaur eggshells are rare. This is because the breakdown of tannins from the local coniferous vegetation caused the ancient waters to be acidic, and therefore usually eggshell fragments dissolved in the water before they had a chance to be fossilized.

Hadrosaur eggshell fragments are however present in two microfossil sites in the area. Both of these sites are dominated by preserved shells of invertebrate life, primarily shells of pisidiids. The slow dissolution of these minute bivalve shells released calcium carbonate into the water, raising the water's pH high enough that it prevented the hadrosaur eggshell fragments from dissolving before they could be fossilized.

Drawing of the right valve external view of Pisidium moitessierianum

Drawing of the right valve internal view of Pisidium moitessierianum

Drawing of the right valve lateral view of Pisidium moitessierianum

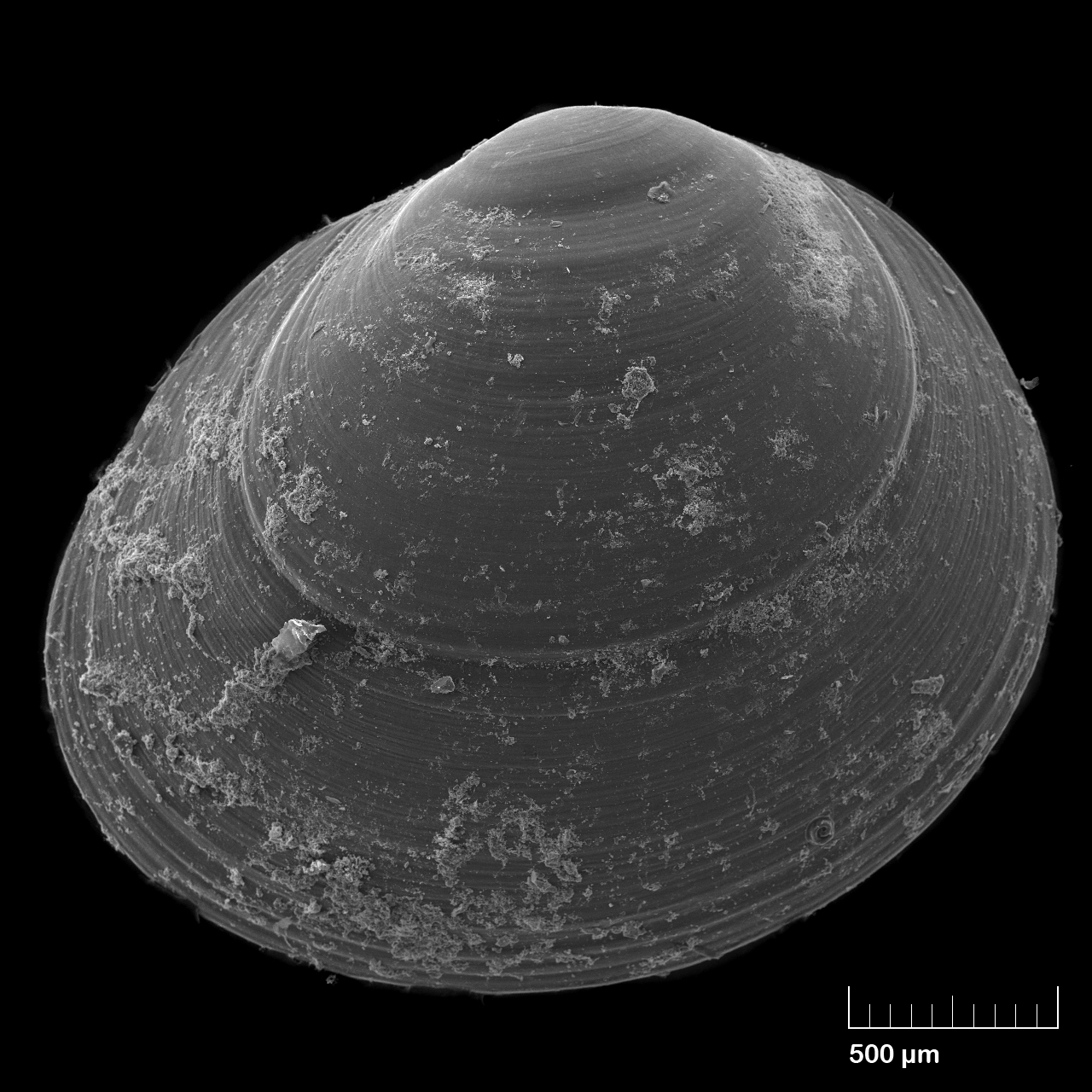
SEM image of Pisidium sp.

== Extant subgenera and species ==
Extant species within the genus Pisidium include:

- Pisidium amnicum (O. F. Müller, 1774)
- Pisidium amurense Moskvicheva, 1985
- Pisidium armillatum Kuiper, 1966
- Pisidium artifex Kuiper, 1960
- Pisidium baicalense W. Dybowski, 1902
- Pisidium bejumae H. B. Baker, 1930
- Pisidium betafoense Kuiper, 1953
- Pisidium boliviense Sturany, 1900
- Pisidium chicha Ituarte, 2005
- Pisidium chiquitanum Ituarte, 2001
- Pisidium cruciatum Sterki, 1895
- Pisidium decurtatum Lindholm, 1909
- Pisidium dilatatum Westerlund, 1897
- Pisidium dorbignyi Clessin, 1877
- Pisidium dubium (Say, 1817)
- Pisidium fistulosum Mandahl-Barth, 1954
- Pisidium forense Meier-Brook, 1967
- Pisidium globulus Clessin, 1888
- Pisidium habbemae Odhner, 1940
- Pisidium huillichum Ituarte, 1999
- Pisidium idahoense E. W. Roper, 1890
- Pisidium inacayali Ituarte, 1996
- Pisidium inflexum Odhner, 1940
- Pisidium invenustum Kuiper, 1966
- Pisidium iquito Ituarte, 2004
- Pisidium jamaicense Prime, 1865
- Pisidium johnsoni E. A. Smith, 1882
- Pisidium lebruni Mabille, 1884
- Pisidium llanquihuense Ituarte, 1999
- Pisidium magellanicum (Dall, 1908)
- Pisidium meierbrooki Kuiper & Hinz, 1984
- Pisidium montigenum Kuiper, 1966
- Pisidium observationis Pilsbry, 1911
- Pisidium ocloya Ituarte, 2005
- Pisidium omaguaca Ituarte, 2005
- Pisidium orientale Prozorova, 1995
- Pisidium patagonicum Pilsbry, 1911
- Pisidium pipoense Ituarte, 2000
- Pisidium plenilunium (Melvill & Standen, 1907)
- Pisidium punctatum Sterki, 1895
- Pisidium punctiferum (Guppy, 1867)
- Pisidium reticulatum Kuiper, 1966
- Pisidium sanguinichristi D. W. Taylor, 1987
- Pisidium sterkianum Pilsbry, 1897
- Pisidium taraguyense Ituarte, 2000
- Pisidium vile Pilsbry, 1897
- Pisidium volutabundum Vanatta, 1910
- Pisidium wilhelminae Odhner, 1940

The following species require evaluation to confirm their placement in Pisidium; many of the following are taxa inquirenda and have not been used by recent authors:

- Pisidium acuminatum Clessin, 1874
- Pisidium acutum L. Pfeiffer, 1841
- Pisidium alienum Clessin, 1879
- Pisidium bartolomeum Clessin, 1873
- Pisidium colbeuai Clessin, 1875
- Pisidium costatum Sterki, 1903
- Pisidium costulatum Westerlund, 1898
- Pisidium demissum Clessin, 1876
- Pisidium duplicatum L. Pfeiffer, 1841
- Pisidium foreli Clessin, 1876
- Pisidium herminii Clessin, 1877
- Pisidium italicum Clessin, 1875
- Pisidium marteli Pallary, 1928
- Pisidium miliolum Clessin, 1907
- Pisidium moreanum Clessin, 1874
- Pisidium obliquum L. Pfeiffer, 1841
- Pisidium obtusale (Lamarck, 1818) sensu C. Pfeiffer, 1821
- Pisidium obtusatum Clessin, 1875
- Pisidium occupatum Clessin, 1876
- Pisidium ovatum Clessin, 1877
- Pisidium persicum Prashad, 1933
- Pisidium pileus Clessin, 1873
- Pisidium profundum Clessin, 1876
- Pisidium rotundatum Pallary, 1922
- Pisidium schmidti Clessin, 1907
- Pisidium shadini Johansen, 1937
- Pisidium sphaeriiforme Clessin, 1874
- Pisidium tumidum Clessin, 1875
- Pisidium watsoni Paiva, 1866
- Pisidium wolfii Clessin, 1879
- undescribed Pisidium species from Africa (Kuiper, in prep., awaiting additional records)

The genera Conventus, Euglesa, Hindupisidium, Odhneripisidium, and Sphaerium were split out from Pisidium after taxonomic revision.
