= Mysomakedones =

Mysomakedones (Greek: Μυσομακεδόνες), also Mysomacedonians or Myso-Macedonians, was a Hellenistic city in Anatolia. It was located in Mysia according to Ptolemy, but in the conventus (district) of Ephesus, Ionia, according to Pliny. Strabo mentions the presence of Macedonians and Mysians in Tmolus mountain, Lydia and the Mesogis region of Ephesus. In 1894, a 1st-century inscription from Antioch on the Maeander mentioning the δῆμος ὁ Μυσομακεδόνων ("demos of Mysomakedones") among Lydian, Phrygian and Carian cities, resolved the question in support of Pliny.

The colony is believed to have been established as a military settlement by the Seleucids and/or Attalids, with the intention to protect the coastal district from the Galatians. Two coins of the city dated to the 1st century have also been found, but the precise location of the settlement has not yet been established.
