= Hood ancylid =

Conservation status
- Least Concern (IUCN 3.1)

Scientific classification
- Kingdom: Animalia
- Phylum: Mollusca
- Class: Gastropoda
- Superorder: Hygrophila
- Family: Planorbidae
- Genus: Ferrissia
- Species: F. mcneili

Binomial name
- Ferrissia mcneili Walker, 1925

Species of gastropod

Ferrissia mcneili, common name the hood ancylid, is a species of small freshwater snail or limpet, an aquatic gastropod mollusk in the family Planorbidae, the ram's horn snails and their allies.

== Distribution ==
This freshwater limpet is endemic to the United States.
