= Ferrissia neozelanica =

Conservation status
- Least Concern (IUCN 3.1)

Scientific classification
- Kingdom: Animalia
- Phylum: Mollusca
- Class: Gastropoda
- Superorder: Hygrophila
- Family: Planorbidae
- Genus: Ferrissia
- Species: F. neozelanica

Binomial name
- Ferrissia neozelanica (Suter, 1905)

Synonyms
- Ferrissia (Kincaidilla) neozelanica (Suter, 1905) · accepted, alternate representation; Gundlachia neozelanica Suter, 1905

Species of gastropod

Ferrissia neozelanica, also known as Gundlachia neozelanica, is a species of small freshwater limpet, an aquatic pulmonate gastropod mollusk, or micromollusk, in the family Planorbidae.

As of 2014, this species was listed in the IUCN Red list twice: as Gundlachia neozelanica - data deficient and as Ferrissia neozelanicus - least concern.

== Shell description ==
Shell depressed conoidal, oval-oblong, the sides straightened, subparallel, thin, semitransparent, horn-colour, with a blackish-green coating. Apex a little inclined to the right, situated at the posterior sixth of the length, flatly convex anteriorly; concentric lines of growth at regular intervals. Interior light brown, shining. Aperture is elongated oval, slightly broadened anteriorly. Specimens have been found with the septum partly formed, but not adult.

The shell length is up to 3 mm, the width up to 2 mm, and height up to 0.75 mm.

== Anatomy ==
These animals have a pallial lung, as do all pulmonate snails, but they also have a false gill or "pseudobranch". This serves as a gill as these limpets may sometimes not be able to reach the surface for air.

== Distribution ==
This freshwater limpet is endemic to the South Island of New Zealand.

== Habitat ==
These tiny limpets are found attached to stems and undersides of leaves of aquatic plants in quiet waters.
