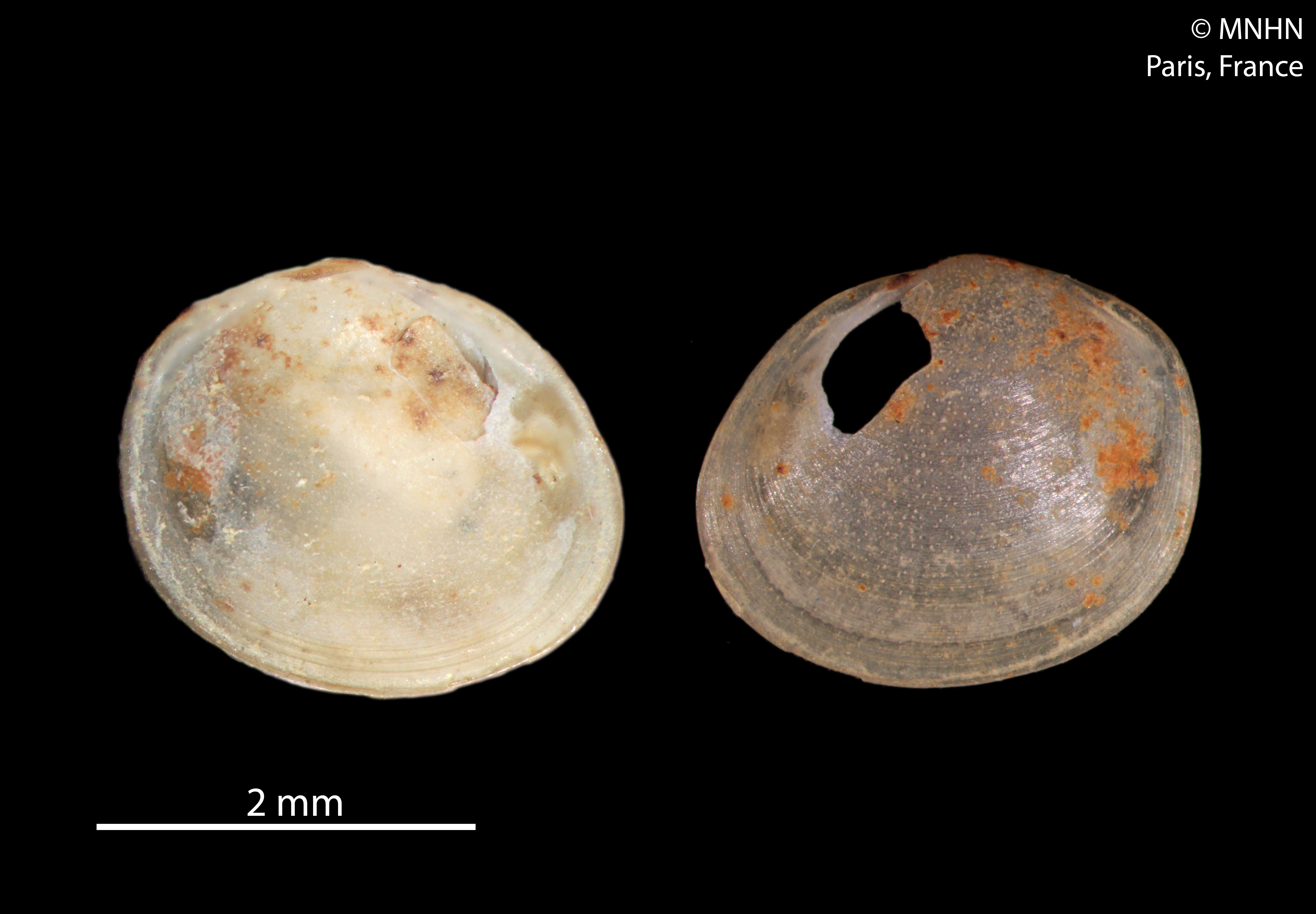

Conservation status
- Data Deficient (IUCN 3.1)

Scientific classification
- Kingdom: Animalia
- Phylum: Mollusca
- Class: Bivalvia
- Order: Sphaeriida
- Family: Sphaeriidae
- Genus: Euglesa
- Species: E. fultoni

Binomial name
- Euglesa fultoni (Kuiper, 1983)

Synonyms
- Pisidium fultoni Kuiper, 1983

= Euglesa fultoni =

Species of bivalve

Euglesa fultoni is a species of bivalve in the family Sphaeriidae. It is endemic to central Tasmania and Australia. It has been recorded in several freshwater locations including Arthurs Lake, Lake Sorrell, Lake Butters, Lake Malbena, Lake Olive, and Lake Nugetena.
