= Euglesa nitida =

- Drawing of the left valve external view of Euglesa nitida

Conservation status
- Least Concern (IUCN 3.1)

- Secure (NatureServe)

Scientific classification
- Kingdom: Animalia
- Phylum: Mollusca
- Class: Bivalvia
- Order: Sphaeriida
- Family: Sphaeriidae
- Genus: Euglesa
- Species: E. nitida

Binomial name
- Euglesa nitida (Jenyns, 1832)

Species of bivalve

Euglesa nitida, the shining pea clam, is a species of small freshwater clam, an aquatic bivalve mollusc in the family Sphaeriidae, the pea clams and fingernail clams.

== Description ==
The 3 – 4 mm. shell is slightly tumid (swollen). In shape it is regular-oval with low umbos slightly behind the midpoint. The umbonal area is demarcated by three concentric furrows. The surface (periostracum) is very glossy, with prominent irregularly spaced concentric striae. The colour is yellowish.

== Distribution ==
Its native distribution is Holarctic.

- Czech Republic – in Bohemia, in Moravia, - least concern (LC)
- Slovakia
- Germany – distributed in whole Germany, endangered (gefährdet) in Bavaria and Arten der Vorwarnliste in Brandenburg.
- Nordic countries: Denmark, Faroes, Finland, Iceland, Norway and Sweden
- Great Britain and Ireland
