= Odhneripisidium stewarti =

Conservation status
- Data Deficient (IUCN 3.1)

Scientific classification
- Kingdom: Animalia
- Phylum: Mollusca
- Class: Bivalvia
- Order: Sphaeriida
- Family: Sphaeriidae
- Genus: Odhneripisidium
- Species: O. stewarti

Binomial name
- Odhneripisidium stewarti (Preston, 1909)

Synonyms
- Odhneripisidium (Odhneripisidium) kungejense (Butenko & Starobogatov, 1967); Odhneripisidium (Odhneripisidium) prashadi (Odhner, 1937); Odhneripisidium (Odhneripisidium) stewarti (Preston, 1909); Odhneripisidium (Odhneripisidium) vincentianum (Woodward, 1913); Odhneripisidium kungejense (Butenko & Starobogatov, 1967); Pisidium (Neopisidium) prashadi Odhner, 1937; Pisidium (Odheripisidium) kungejense Butenko & Starobogatov, 1967; Pisidium (Odhneripisidium) prashadi Odhner, 1937; Pisidium (Odhneripisidium) stewarti Preston, 1909; Pisidium kungejense Butenko & Starobogatov, 1967; Pisidium stewarti Preston, 1909; Pisidium vincentianum Woodward, 1913

Species of bivalve

Odhneripisidium stewarti is a species of small freshwater clam. It is an aquatic bivalve mollusc in the family Sphaeriidae, the fingernail clams and pea clams.

== Distribution ==
This minute clam, which is known in Europe as a decidedly Pleistocene glacial species, has also been identified as a Recent species in the Central Asian high mountainous massifs of Tien Shan, the Pamir Mountains and the Himalaya.

The recent distribution includes:

- Tibet, China
