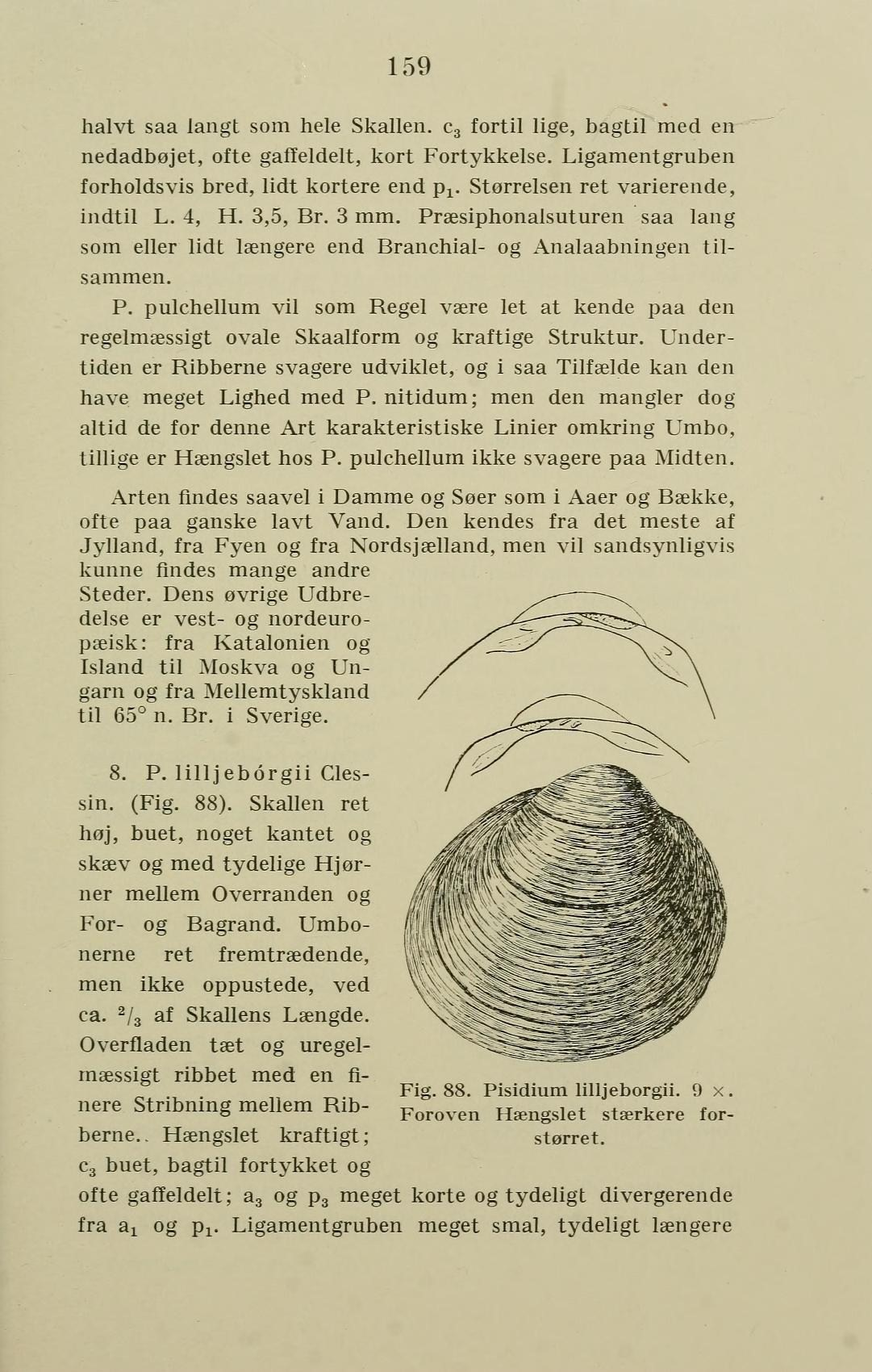
- Pisidium lilljeborgii in Danmarks Fauna

Conservation status
- Least Concern (IUCN 3.1)

- Secure (NatureServe)

Scientific classification
- Kingdom: Animalia
- Phylum: Mollusca
- Class: Bivalvia
- Order: Sphaeriida
- Family: Sphaeriidae
- Genus: Euglesa
- Species: E. lilljeborgii

Binomial name
- Euglesa lilljeborgii (Clessin, 1886)

Synonyms
- List: Euglesa (Arcteuglesa) formosa Prozorova, 1988; Euglesa (Arcteuglesa) glaciata Prozorova, 1988; Euglesa (Arcteuglesa) izzatullaevi Zatravkin, 1987; Euglesa (Costopisidium) elegantula Starobogatov & Budnikova, 1985; Euglesa (Costopisidium) kurilica Starobogatov & Budnikova, 1985; Euglesa (Costopisidium) morii Starobogatov & Budnikova, 1985; Euglesa (Henslowiana) elegantula Starobogatov & Budnikova, 1985; Euglesa (Henslowiana) formosa Prozorova, 1988; Euglesa (Henslowiana) glaciata Prozorova, 1988; Euglesa (Henslowiana) izzatullaevi Zatravkin, 1987; Euglesa (Henslowiana) kunasiriensis (Mori, 1938); Euglesa (Henslowiana) kurilica Starobogatov & Budnikova, 1985; Euglesa (Henslowiana) kurodai (Mori, 1938); Euglesa (Henslowiana) lilljeborgi (Clessin, 1886); Euglesa (Henslowiana) morii Starobogatov & Budnikova, 1985; Euglesa (Henslowiana) ruut Timm, 1975; Euglesa (Henslowiana) semenkevitschi (Lindholm, 1909); Euglesa (Henslowiana) sibirica (Clessin, 1876); Euglesa (Henslowiana) uenoi (Mori, 1938); Euglesa lilljeborgi (Clessin, 1886); Euglesa ruut Timm, 1975; Henslowiana (Arcteuglesa) elegantula (Starobogatov & Budnikova, 1985); Henslowiana (Arcteuglesa) formosa (Prozorova, 1988); Henslowiana (Arcteuglesa) glaciata (Prozorova, 1988); Henslowiana (Arcteuglesa) izzatullaevi (Zatravkin, 1987); Henslowiana (Arcteuglesa) kurilica (Starobogatov & Budnikova, 1985); Henslowiana (Arcteuglesa) kurodai (Mori, 1938); Henslowiana (Arcteuglesa) lilljeborgii (Clessin, 1886); Henslowiana (Arcteuglesa) morii (Starobogatov & Budnikova, 1985); Henslowiana (Arcteuglesa) ruut (Timm, 1975); Henslowiana (Arcteuglesa) uenoi (Mori, 1938); Henslowiana nordenskioldi (Clessin, 1877); Pisidium (Eupisidium) kurodai Mori, 1938; Pisidium (Fossarina) nordenskioldi Westerlund, 1876; Pisidium (Tropidocyclas) lilljeborgii Clessin, 1886; Pisidium lilljeborgii Clessin, 1886; Pisidium lilljeborgii f. cristatum Sterki, 1928; Pisidium pulchellum kunasiriensis Mori, 1938; Pisidium scutellatum Sterki, 1896; Pisidium sibiricum Clessin, 1876; Pisidium uenoi Mori, 1938

= Euglesa lilljeborgii =

Species of bivalve

Euglesa lilljeborgii is a species of freshwater bivalve from the family Sphaeriidae.

== Description ==
A moderately swollen (tumid), trapezoidal shell. The umbos are just behind the mid point and described as fairly narrow. The surface (periostracum) is slightly glossy and has coarse, irregular concentric striae. The colour is grey to brownish white. Euglesa lilljeborgii has a less equilateral shape than Pisidium hibernicum 3-4.5mm.

== Distribution and conservation status ==
- Germany – high endangered (Stark gefährdet)
- Nordic countries: Denmark, Faroes, Finland, Iceland, Norway and Sweden
- Great Britain and Ireland
