= Pisidium artifex =

Conservation status
- Vulnerable (IUCN 3.1)

Scientific classification
- Kingdom: Animalia
- Phylum: Mollusca
- Class: Bivalvia
- Order: Sphaeriida
- Superfamily: Sphaerioidea
- Family: Sphaeriidae
- Genus: Pisidium
- Species: P. artifex

Binomial name
- Pisidium artifex Kuiper, 1960

Species of bivalve

Pisidium artifex is a species of freshwater clam in the family Sphaeriidae. It is endemic to Kenya, where it is known only from Mount Kenya. It lives in water bodies at an elevation of 4,300 metres.
