= Pettancylus =

Scientific classification
- Kingdom: Animalia
- Phylum: Mollusca
- Class: Gastropoda
- Superorder: Hygrophila
- Family: Planorbidae
- Subfamily: Ancylinae
- Tribe: Ancylini
- Genus: Pettancylus; Iredale, 1943

Type species
- Ancylus tasmanica Tenison Woods, 1876

Synonyms
- Ferrissia (Pettancylus) Iredale, 1943; Problancylus Iredale, 1943

Genus of gastropods

Pettancylus is a genus of air-breathing freshwater snails, pulmonate gastropod mollusks in the subfamily Ancylinae of the family Planorbidae.

== Species ==
- Pettancylus baconi (Bourguignat, 1854)
- Pettancylus burnupi (Walker, 1912)
- Pettancylus cawstoni (Walker, 1924)
- Pettancylus ceylanicus (Benson, 1864)
- Pettancylus chudeaui (Germain, 1917)
- Pettancylus clessiniana (Jickeli, 1882)
- Pettancylus clifdeni (Connolly, 1939)
- Pettancylus connollyi (Walker, 1912)
- Pettancylus eburnensis (E. Binder, 1957)
- Pettancylus farquhari (B. Walker, 1912)
- Pettancylus fivefallsiensis (Sankarappan, Chellapandian, Vimalanathan, Mani, Sundaram & Muthukalingan, 2015)
- Pettancylus fontinalis (B. Walker, 1912)
- Pettancylus isseli (Bourguignat, 1866)
- Pettancylus javanus (von Martens, 1897)
- Pettancylus junodi (Connolly, 1925)
- Pettancylus kavirondicus (Mandahl-Barth, 1954)
- Pettancylus lacustris (B. Walker, 1924)
- Pettancylus leonensis (Connolly, 1928)
- Pettancylus lhotelleriei (B. Walker, 1914)
- Pettancylus modestus (Crosse, 1880)
- Pettancylus natalensis (B. Walker, 1924)
- Pettancylus nipponicus (Kuroda, 1949)
- Pettancylus noumeensis (Crosse, 1871)
- Pettancylus pallaryi (Walker, 1914)
- Pettancylus petterdi (R. M. Johnston, 1879)
- Pettancylus ruandensis (Thiele, 1911)
- Pettancylus siamensis (Brandt, 1974)
- Pettancylus tanganyicensis (E.A. Smith, 1906)
- Pettancylus tasmanica (Tenison Woods, 1876)
- Pettancylus tenuis (Bourguignat, 1862)
- Pettancylus toroensis (Mandahl-Barth, 1954)
- Pettancylus verruca (Benson, 1855)
- Pettancylus vicinus (Thiele, 1911)
- Pettancylus victoriensis (B. Walker, 1912)
- Pettancylus viola (Annandale & Prashad, 1921)
- Pettancylus zambesiensis (B. Walker, 1912)
- Pettancylus zambiensis (Mandahl-Barth, 1968)

Species brought into synonymy

- Pettancylus sharpi (Sykes, 1900): synonym of Ferrissia californica (Rowell, 1863)
