= Euglesa maasseni =

Conservation status
- Critically Endangered (IUCN 3.1)

Scientific classification
- Kingdom: Animalia
- Phylum: Mollusca
- Class: Bivalvia
- Order: Sphaeriida
- Family: Sphaeriidae
- Genus: Euglesa
- Species: E. maasseni

Binomial name
- Euglesa maasseni (Kuiper, 1987)
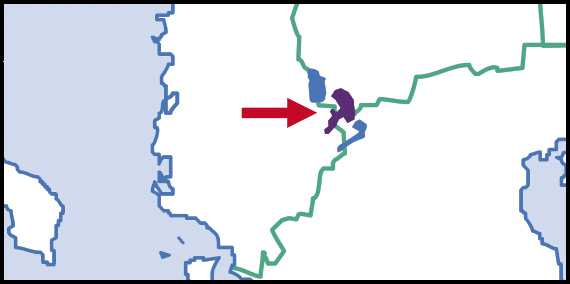

Synonyms
- Pisidium maasseni Kuiper, 1987; Pisidium (Cyclocalyx) maasseni Kuiper, 1987

Species of bivalve

Euglesa maasseni is a species of freshwater bivalve in the family Sphaeriidae. It is a critically endangered species endemic to Lake Prespa in Europe, where it is known from the northern part of the lake in Albanian and North Macedonian territory.
