= Euglesa supina =

Conservation status
- Least Concern (IUCN 3.1)

- Secure (NatureServe)

Scientific classification
- Kingdom: Animalia
- Phylum: Mollusca
- Class: Bivalvia
- Order: Sphaeriida
- Family: Sphaeriidae
- Genus: Euglesa
- Species: E. supina

Binomial name
- Euglesa supina (Schmidt, 1851)

Species of bivalve

Euglesa supina is a species of small freshwater clam, a pea clam, an aquatic bivalve mollusc in the family Sphaeriidae (the fingernail clams and pea clams.)

The shell of this species is 3 to 5 mm in size, and is roughly triangular in shape.

== Distribution ==
Its native distribution is Palearctic.

- Czech Republic – in Bohemia, in Moravia, vulnerable (VU)
- Germany – endangered (gefährdet)
- Nordic countries: Denmark, Finland (endangered), Norway and Sweden (not recorded in Faroes, Iceland)
