= Ferrissia gentilis =

Conservation status
- Least Concern (IUCN 3.1)

Scientific classification
- Kingdom: Animalia
- Phylum: Mollusca
- Class: Gastropoda
- Superorder: Hygrophila
- Family: Planorbidae
- Genus: Ferrissia
- Species: F. gentilis

Binomial name
- Ferrissia gentilis Lanzer, 1991

Species of gastropod

Ferrissia gentilis is a species of a small freshwater snail or limpet, an aquatic gastropod mollusc belonging to the Planorbidae family, which includes ram's horn snails and related allies.

== Distribution ==
This freshwater limpet is endemic to Brazil, where it is known from the coastal regions of Goiás, Rio Grande do Sul and Santa Catarina in the south of the country.

== Habitat and ecology ==
F. gentilis occurs in ponds and rivers, where it is found on substrates dominated by organic material and sludge. It commonly associates with the roots of the Water Hyacinth species Eichhornia azurea and E. crassipes.
