= Pisidium dilatatum =

Conservation status
- Least Concern (IUCN 3.1)

Scientific classification
- Kingdom: Animalia
- Phylum: Mollusca
- Class: Bivalvia
- Order: Sphaeriida
- Family: Sphaeriidae
- Genus: Pisidium
- Species: P. dilatatum

Binomial name
- Pisidium dilatatum Westerlund, 1897

Synonyms
- Pisidium (Lacustrina) dilatata Westerlund, 1897; Pisidium maculatum Dybowski, 1902; Pisidium maculatum var. elegans Dybowski, 1902

Species of bivalve

Pisidium dilatatum is a species of freshwater bivalve belonging to the family Sphaeriidae. It is widespread in Europe and Asia, from southern Sweden in the west to Lake Baikal in the east. It occurs in oligotrophic lakes.
