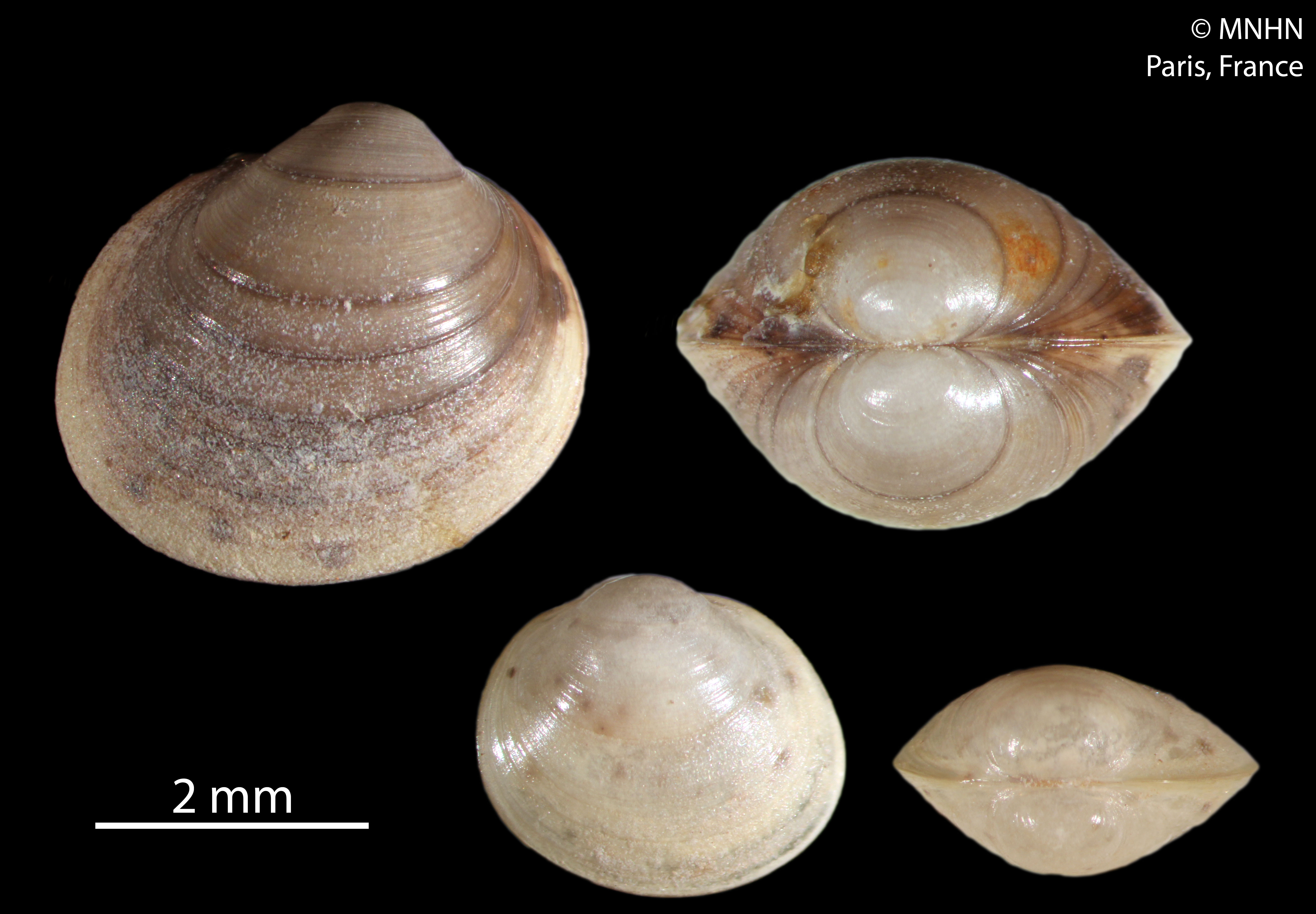

Conservation status
- Least Concern (IUCN 3.1)

Scientific classification
- Kingdom: Animalia
- Phylum: Mollusca
- Class: Bivalvia
- Order: Sphaeriida
- Family: Sphaeriidae
- Genus: Euglesa
- Species: E. waldeni

Binomial name
- Euglesa waldeni (Kuiper, 1975)

= Euglesa waldeni =

Species of bivalve

Euglesa waldeni is a species of mollusc belonging to the family Sphaeriidae.

It is native to Northern Europe.

Synonym:

- Pisidium waldeni Kuiper, 1975 (= basionym)
