= Pettancylus tenuis =

Conservation status
- Least Concern (IUCN 3.1)

Scientific classification
- Kingdom: Animalia
- Phylum: Mollusca
- Class: Gastropoda
- Superorder: Hygrophila
- Family: Planorbidae
- Genus: Pettancylus
- Species: P. tenuis

Binomial name
- Pettancylus tenuis (Bourguignat, 1862)

Synonyms
- Ancylus tenuis Bourguignat, 1862; Ferrissia tenuis (Bourguignat, 1862)

Species of gastropod

Pettancylus tenuis is a species of a freshwater snail or limpet, an aquatic gastropod in the family Planorbidae.

== Distribution ==
This species is found in India.

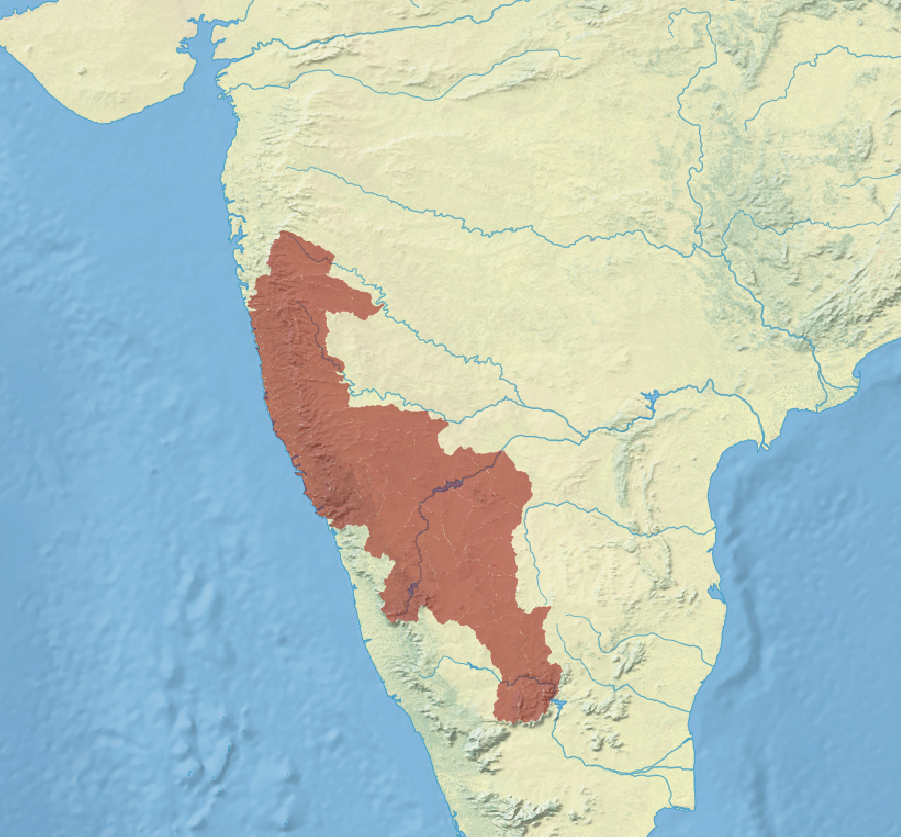
Distribution map of Pettancylus tenuis.

== Ecology ==
The population trend of this species is unknown.

Pettancylus tenuis is considered as a suspected host of Schistosoma haematobium in India.
