= Odhneripisidium tenuilineatum =

Conservation status
- Least Concern (IUCN 3.1)

Scientific classification
- Kingdom: Animalia
- Phylum: Mollusca
- Class: Bivalvia
- Order: Sphaeriida
- Family: Sphaeriidae
- Genus: Odhneripisidium
- Species: O. tenuilineatum

Binomial name
- Odhneripisidium tenuilineatum (Stelfox, 1918)

Synonyms
- Neopisidium (Europisidium) alpinum (Odhner, 1938); Neopisidium (Europisidium) tenuilineatum (Stelfox, 1918); Neopisidium stelfoxi Pirogov & Starobogatov, 1976; Pisidium (Europisidium) alpinum Odhner, 1938; Pisidium (Europisidium) stelfoxi (Pirogov & Starobogatov, 1976); Pisidium (Europisidium) tenuilineatum Stelfox, 1918; Pisidium tenuilineatum Stelfox, 1918; Pisidium tenuilineatum f. alpinum Odhner, 1938

Species of bivalve

Odhneripisidium tenuilineatum, the fine-lined pea mussel, is a species of small freshwater bivalve in the family Sphaeriidae.

== Distribution ==
The species is widely distributed in western and central Europe:

- British Isles – listed in List of endangered species in the British Isles. It is rare in Great Britain.
- Czech Republic – in Bohemia, in Moravia, critically endangered
- Denmark
- Germany – highly endangered (Stark gefährdet)
- Poland – Near Threatened (NT, mentioned as lower risk LR)
- Netherlands
- Slovakia – a rare species
- Sweden
- and other states
