= Conventus =

Scientific classification
- Kingdom: Animalia
- Phylum: Mollusca
- Class: Bivalvia
- Order: Sphaeriida
- Superfamily: Sphaerioidea
- Family: Sphaeriidae
- Genus: Conventus; Pirogov & Starobogatov, 1974

Type species
- Pisidium conventus Clessin, 1877

Species
- C. conventus (Clessin, 1877); C. ellisi (Dance, 1967); C. insigne (Gabb, 1868); C. raddei (Dybowski, 1902); C. subconventus (Starobogatov & Streletzkaja, 1967)

Synonyms
- Neopisidium (Conventus) Pirogov & Starobogatov, 1974; Euglesa (Conventus) Pirogov & Starobogatov, 1974; Conventus (Conventus) Pirogov & Starobogatov, 1974; Conventus (Kurilipisidium) Prozorova, 1997

Genus of bivalves

Conventus is a genus of freshwater bivalves in the family Sphaeriidae. Species in this genus are known from Europe, North America, and South Asia, including Arctic regions.

== Taxonomy and history ==
Conventus was initially described as a subgenus of Neopisidium in 1974 by V.V. Pirogov and Yaroslav Starobogatov. It has also been considered a subgenus of Euglesa. Conventus was elevated to generic status in a 2024 article published in the Zoological Journal of the Linnean Society based on phylogenetic analysis.

== Species ==
This genus includes the following species:

- Conventus conventus (Clessin, 1877)
- Conventus ellisi (Dance, 1967)
- Conventus insigne (Gabb, 1868)
- Conventus raddei (Dybowski, 1902)
- Conventus subconventus (Starobogatov & Streletzkaja, 1967)
