= Pisidium hibernicum =

- External view of valve of Pisidium hibernicum

Scientific classification
- Kingdom: Animalia
- Phylum: Mollusca
- Class: Bivalvia
- Order: Sphaeriida
- Family: Sphaeriidae
- Genus: Pisidium
- Species: P. hibernicum

Binomial name
- Pisidium hibernicum Westerlund, 1894

Species of bivalve

Pisidium hibernicum is a species of freshwater bivalve from the family Sphaeriidae.

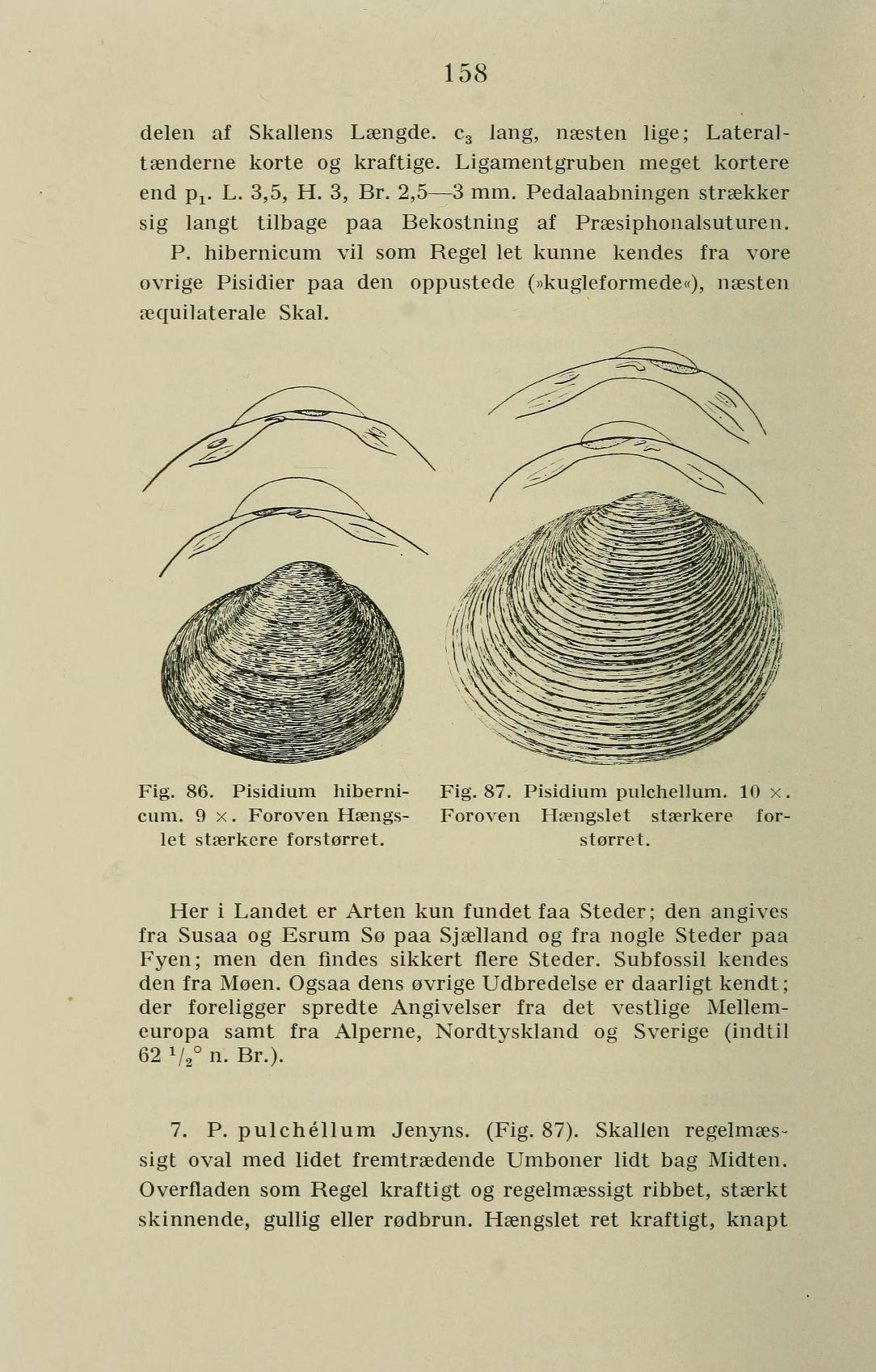
Pisidium hibernicum and P. pulchellum in Danmarks Fauna

== Description ==
The 2.5-3.5mm. shell is very inflated (convex) hence the common name Globular Pea Shell. The central umbos is prominent. The periostracum (surface) is silky glossy and sculptured by fine, regular striae. In colour it is greyish to brownish white often with scattered red-brown mineral deposits.

== Distribution ==
Its native distribution is Palearctic.

- Czech Republic – endangered (EN), endangered in Bohemia (EN), critically endangered in Moravia
- Slovakia
- Germany – endangered (gefährdet)
- Nordic countries: Denmark, Faroes, Finland, Iceland, Norway and Sweden
- Great Britain and Ireland
