= Wildlife of Sweden =

Located in the Scandinavian Peninsula, Sweden is a mountainous country dominated by lakes and forests. Its habitats include mountain heath, montane forests, tundra, taiga, beech forests, rivers, lakes, bogs, brackish and marine coastal ecosystems, and cultivated land. The climate of Sweden is mild for a country at this latitude, largely owing to the significant maritime influence.

== Geography ==
Sweden is an elongated country east of Norway and west of the Baltic Sea and the Gulf of Bothnia. It extends from a latitude of 55°N (similar to Newcastle or Moscow) to more than 70°N, which is north of the Arctic Circle. To the southwest lie the Skagerrak and the Kattegat seas. To the northeast is the land border with Finland, marked by the Torne River. The coastline along the Baltic Sea is indented with many small islands and two larger ones, Gotland and Öland. Lakes are numerous, ranging in size from small ponds to Vänern, the third largest lake in Europe.

Most of northern and central Sweden, roughly north of the large river Dalälven, constitutes the Norrland terrain which consists of large, barren areas of hilly and mountainous land gradually rising from the Gulf of Bothnia to the Scandinavian Mountains (or Scandes) in the west. These mountains, which form the border with Norway in the north, are mostly around 1000 meters in height, but Kebnekaise reaches 2097 meters, making it the tallest mountain in Sweden and northern Scandinavia.

The geology of the Scandes is quite diverse; often reflected in differences in the flora. South of Dalälven is a low-lying area surrounding the large lakes Mälaren and Hjälmaren. The soils in this area are clayey and fertile, having originated from marine deposits during the latest glaciation. Due to the rich soils, this area became one of the main agricultural regions in Sweden.

To the south, there are some minor hilly and barren areas, such as Tiveden. East and west of Lake Vättern are intensively cultivated plains on sedimentary rock. To the south of this region, the land rises again to the South Swedish highlands, a terrain of mostly barren hills reaching 377 meters. The southernmost province of Scania differs from the rest of Sweden in consisting almost entirely of mostly flat, arable land, and also in its complex geology, which includes Mesozoic rocks and abrasion coasts. The rest of Sweden mostly consists of gneiss and granite, sometimes forming archipelagos (Swedish skärgård) of fairly small, bare, rounded rocks in the northern part of the west coast and around Stockholm. The Baltic islands Öland and Gotland consist almost entirely of Ordovician and Silurian limestone, respectively.

== Climate ==
Despite its northerly latitude, most parts of Sweden have a temperate climate with few temperature extremes. Climatically, the country can be divided into three regions; the northernmost part has a subarctic climate, the central part a humid continental climate and the southernmost part an oceanic climate. The country is much warmer and drier than other places at a similar latitude, mainly because of the combination of the Gulf Stream and the general westerly direction of the wind. The northern half of the country gets less rainfall than Norway because of the rain shadow effect caused by the Scandinavian Mountains.

== Biodiversity ==
There are an estimated 55,000 species of animals and plants in terrestrial habitats in Sweden, this relatively low number is attributed to the cold climate; These include 73 species of mammal, about 240 breeding bird species (and another 60 or so non-breeding species which can be seen rarely or annually), 6 species of reptile, 12 species of amphibian, 56 species of freshwater fish, around 2000 species of vascular plants, close to 1000 species of bryophyte, and over 2000 lichens.

Sweden had a 2019 Forest Landscape Integrity Index mean score of 5.35/10, ranking it 103rd globally out of 172 countries.

== Flora and vegetation ==
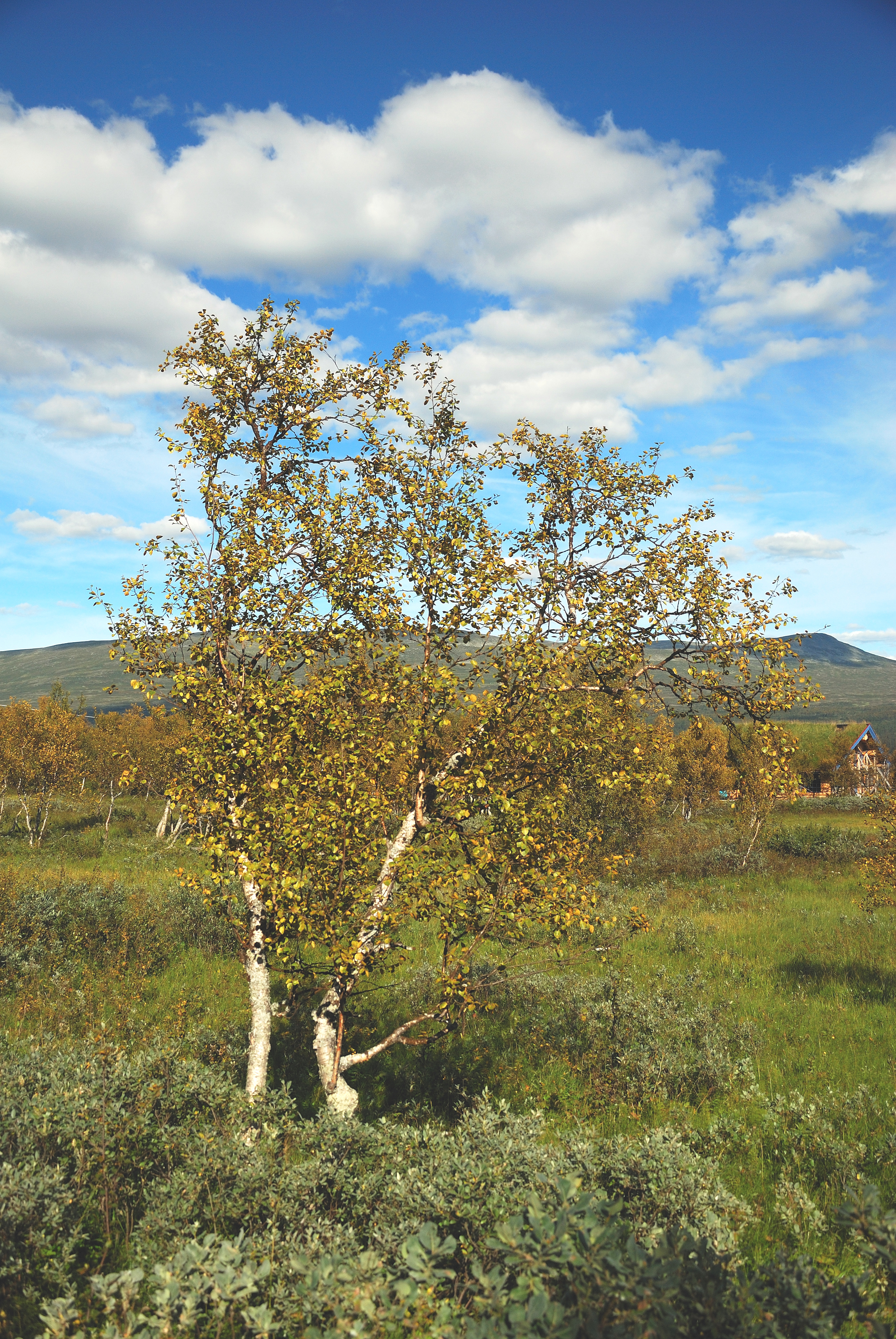
Mountain birch near the treeline.

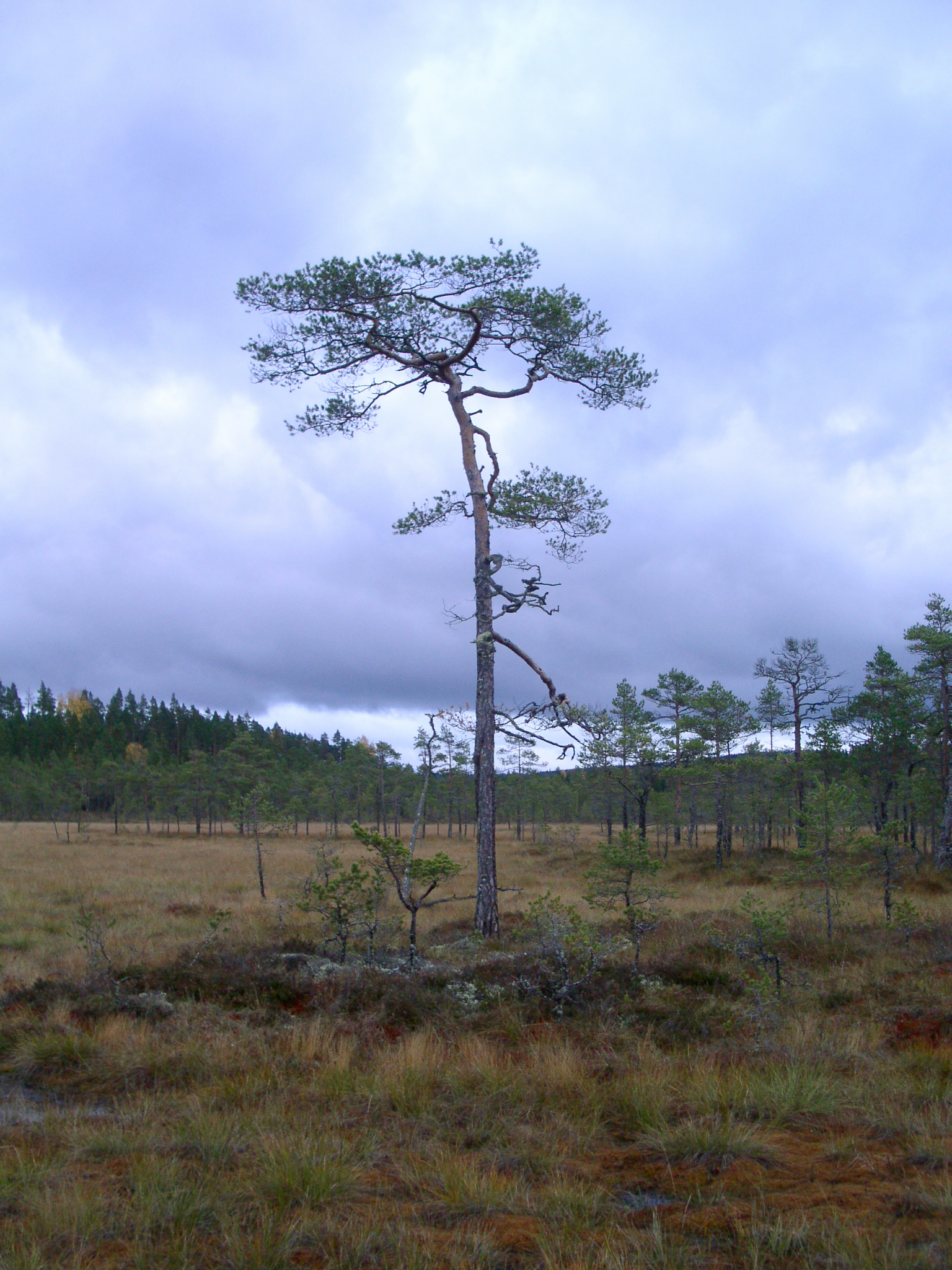
Peat bog in Dalarna, the Scots pine is common in the boreal forest.

Beech (Fagus sylvatica) is the dominant tree species in the region of Skåne and along a narrow strip of the west coast. This is called the nemoral zone. Forest herbs in this zone typically vegetate and flower in spring, as the crown of beech is very dense, and little light reaches the ground once the leaves appear. Examples are Anemone spp. and Corydalis spp.

Oak (Quercus robur and Quercus petraea) forests occur on poor soils in southernmost Sweden. Forests of alder (Alnus glutinosa), ash (Fraxinus excelsior), and elm (Ulmus glabra) grow in nutrient-rich, often wet soil, but most of these areas have long since been drained and converted to arable fields.

Most of Sweden below the mountains is covered by conifer forests and forms part of the circumboreal zone. South of the river Dalälven, there are scattered deciduous trees like oak (Quercus robur), and this zone is referred to as boreo-nemoral. North of Dalälven, in the proper boreal (taiga) zone, deciduous trees are rarer, but birches (Betula pubescens and Betula pendula) and aspen (Populus tremula) may be abundant in early successional stages, such as after a fire or in recently clear-cut areas. There are a total of four native conifers in Sweden, and of these only Norway spruce (Picea abies) and Scots pine (Pinus sylvestris) form forests, in pure or mixed stands. Spruce grows in wetter soils and pine drier soils, but in bogs, there are often numerous stunted pines. The undergrowth in a spruce forest is commonly almost pure stands of bilberry (Vaccinium myrtillus). In wetter areas, ferns (e.g., Athyrium filix-femina and Dryopteris spp.) are abundant, and in richer soils, herbs (e.g., Paris quadrifolia, Actaea spicata) and broad-leaved grasses (e.g., Milium effusum) are more common. In pine forests, lingonberries (Vaccinium vitis-idaea), heather (Calluna vulgaris) and/or Cladonia lichens are most common. Fires occur at irregular intervals and usually kill all spruce and most pines. Fireweed (Epilobium angustifolium), raspberry (Rubus idaeus), and Geranium bohemicum are among the first plants to germinate in the ashes.

In the mountains, the conifers are replaced by birch (Betula pubescens ssp. tortuosa), which forms the tree line in most areas. The undergrowth in these forests is quite variable. Under wet and nutrient-rich conditions, luxuriant vegetation may develop, consisting of tall herbs such as Aconitum septentrionale, Angelica archangelica, and Cicerbita alpina. Above the birch forest, starting at 300–1000 meters, depending on latitude, there are usually willow-thickets, and above these can be found alpine heath or meadows, the former dominated by dwarf shrubs of the family Ericaceae, the latter by sedges, rushes and various herbs such as Saxifraga spp., Dryas octopetala and Draba spp.

Ranunculus glacialis reaches the highest altitude of all vascular plants in Sweden, often growing near the ever-shrinking glaciers.

Wetlands cover large areas in Sweden. In the south, raised bogs are a common variety, of which a striking example is Store Mosse. These bogs largely consist of living and dead Sphagnum spp., with scattered dwarf shrubs and sedges such as Eriophorum vaginatum. In the wet southwest, Narthecium ossifragum and Erica tetralix occur in the bogs, while in the north and the east, the dwarf birch Betula nana and Ledum palustre, an evergreen shrub, are common. Rich fens, with many sedges and orchids, are rather rare, except on Gotland and Öland, two large limestone islands in the Baltic, where Cladium-dominated fens are common. In the north of Sweden, there are many large mire complexes with both fen- and bog-like parts. The largest is found in Sjaunja, a nature reserve in Lapland.

Sweden has as many as 90,000 lakes larger than one hectare. Most of these are either nutrient-poor with clear water and few plants (e.g. Lobelia dortmanna and Isoëtes spp.), like Lake Vattern, or small ponds with brown water surrounded by floating mats of bog vegetation (e.g. sedges and Menyanthes trifoliata). Nutrient-rich lakes are found mostly in the south and typically have dense reed stands, other emergent plants (e.g. Iris pseudacorus and Sparganium erectum), free-floating plants such as Hydrocharis morsus-ranae and Stratiotes aloides, and submerged vegetation with spp. of Potamogeton, Ranunculus, and others. The best-known lakes in this category are undoubtedly Tåkern and Hornborgasjön.

The coast of Sweden is long and conditions are quite different at the endpoints. Near the Norwegian border, conditions are typical of the North Atlantic, turning to subarctic near the Finnish border where salinity is down to 0.1–0.2%. A common seashore species there is the endemic, tussock-forming grass Deschampsia bottnica, which survives the destructive force of up to 2 meters thick sea ice. Common submerged vascular plants in this area, the Gulf of Bothnia, are, among others Myriophyllum sibiricum, Callitriche hermaphroditica and Stuckenia pectinata. On the west coast, one may instead find Zostera marina in similar localities. Diversity, abundance and size of red (Rhodophyta) and brown (Phaeophyta) algae decrease drastically with salinity, while Charophyceae (of the green algae, the Chlorophyta) thrive in the brackish waters of the Baltic.

== Fauna ==
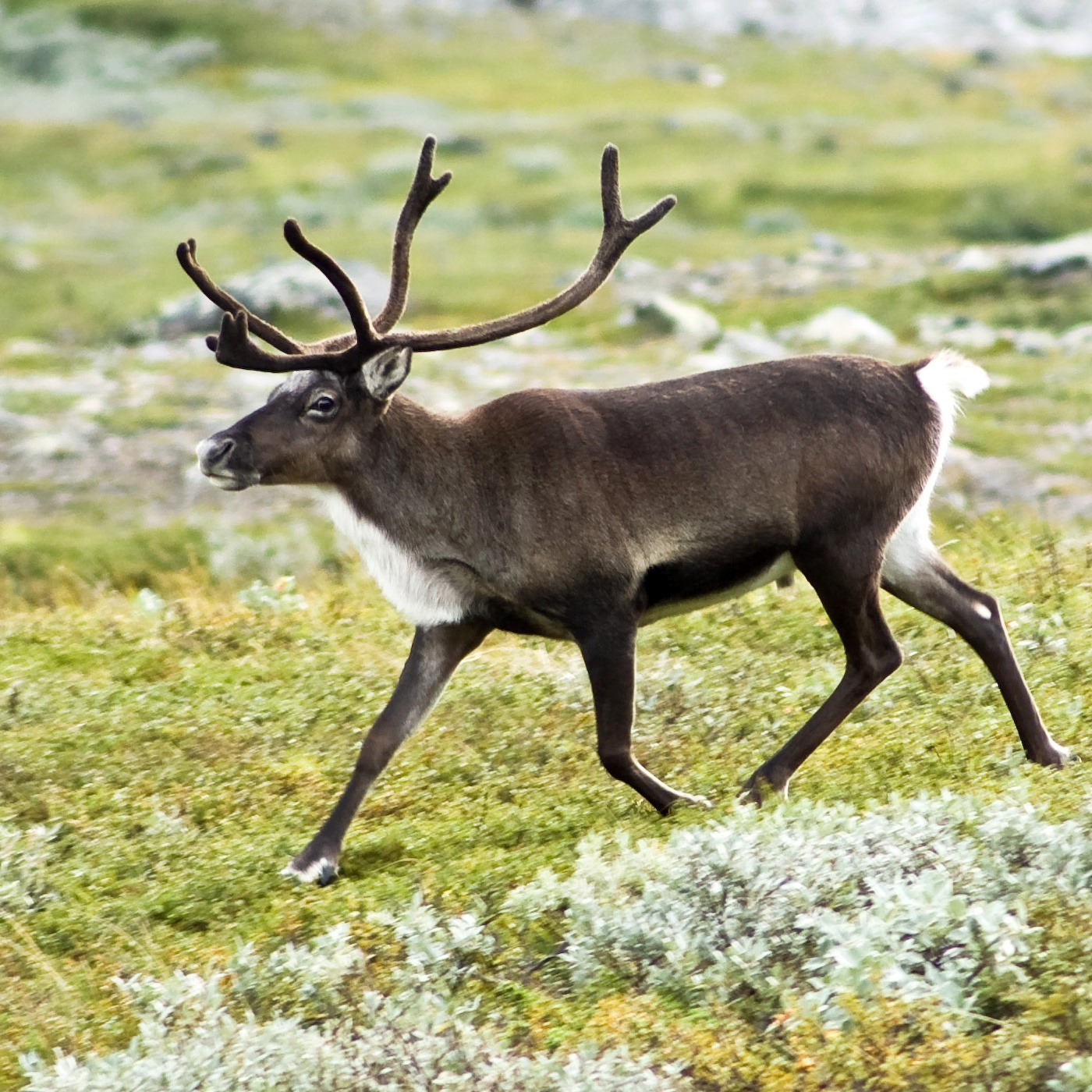
Reindeer

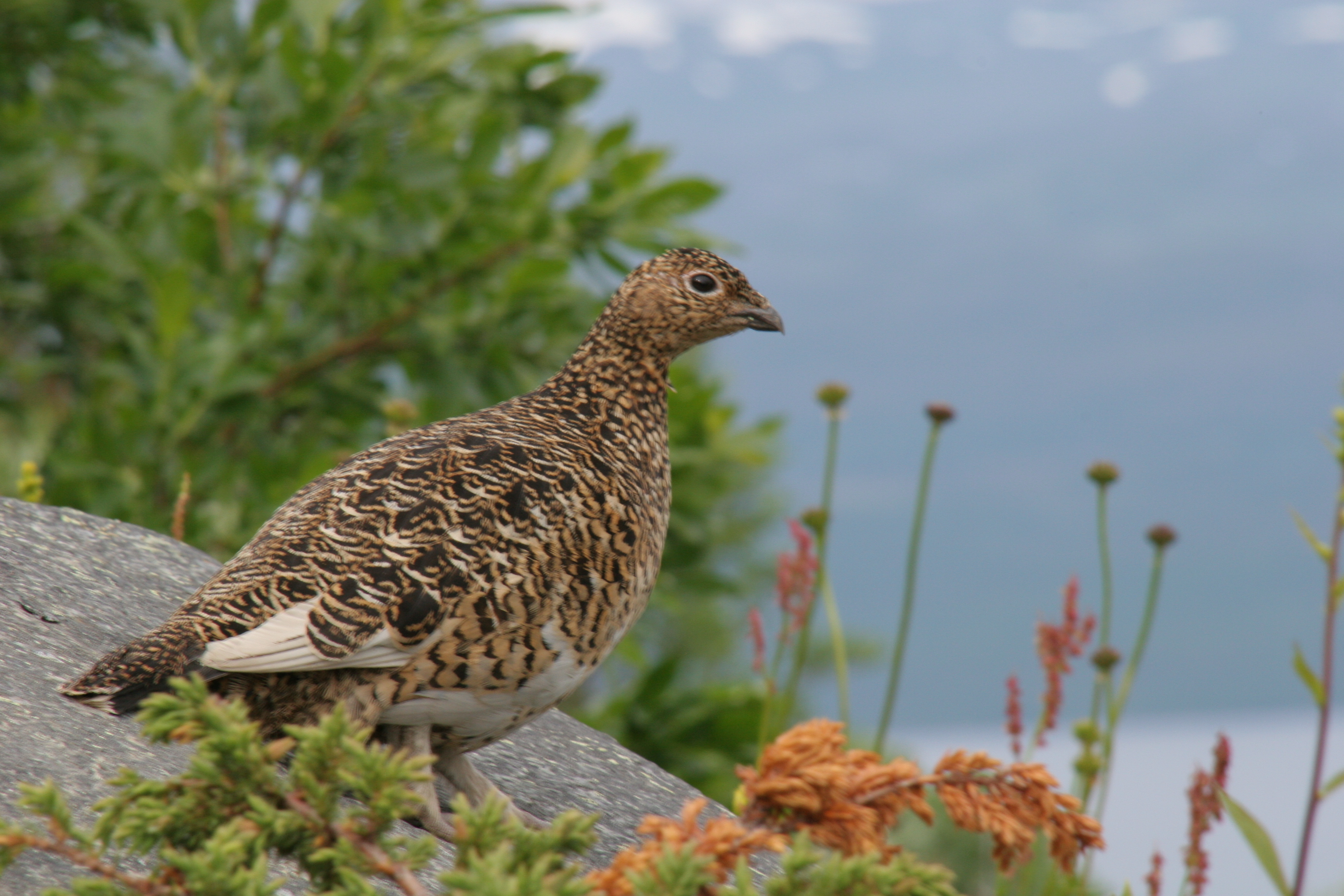
Female willow ptarmigan in summer plumage

According to the IUCN Red List, terrestrial mammals occurring in Sweden include the European hedgehog, the European mole (only in the south), six species of shrews, and eighteen species of bats. The mountain hare, the Eurasian beaver, the red squirrel, as well as about fourteen species of smaller rodents occur in Sweden as well. Of the ungulates, wild boar, red deer, moose, and roe deer are found in the country, as well as semi-domesticated reindeer. Terrestrial carnivores include the brown bear, the wolf, and the red fox. In the mountains, the rare Arctic fox, as well as the mostly northern Eurasian lynx are found. Native mustelids are the European badger, the Eurasian otter, the stoat, the least weasel, the European polecat, the European pine marten, the beech marten (a recent addition) and, in the north, the wolverine. The coast is inhabited by three seal species: harbor seal in the south and west, ringed seal in the Gulf of Bothnia, and grey seal throughout. The porpoise is the only cetacean that breeds in Swedish waters.

The European rabbit, the European hare, and the fallow deer were deliberately introduced, while the raccoon dog, mink, muskrat, brown rat, and house mouse were unintended introductions. All these introductions, perhaps except the fallow deer, have been successful, resulting in viable populations. A small and dwindling herd of muskoxen still exists in the southern part of the mountains. They stem from animals brought to Norway from Greenland.

Sweden's Red List of critically endangered mammals includes Bechstein's bat, the common pipistrelle and the Arctic fox, while endangered mammals include the barbastelle, the serotine bat, the pond bat, the lesser noctule, and the wolf. Listed as vulnerable are the Eurasian otter, the wolverine, the harbor seal, the harbour porpoise, and the Natterer's bat.

According to Avibase: Bird Checklists of the World, 535 species of bird have been recorded in Sweden, but less than half of these breed regularly. Many of them are migratory, making their way between Arctic breeding grounds and overwintering quarters in Europe and Africa. Birds that breed and overwinter in Sweden include tits, corvids, Galliformes, owls and several birds of prey. Canada geese (Branta canadensis) and pheasants (Phasianus colchicus) have been deliberately introduced.

The only endemic fish in Sweden is the critically endangered freshwater Coregonus trybomi, still surviving in only a single lake. Amphibians found in Sweden include eleven species of frogs and toads and two species of newt, while reptiles include four species of snake and three species of lizard. They are all protected under the law.

Sweden has an estimated 108 species of butterflies, 60 species of dragonflies, and 40 species of wood-boring beetles.

== Conservation ==
Some of the significant challenges Swedish wildlife faces include:

- Lack of protection for the few remaining old-growth forests, particularly in the north, severely impacts lichens, mosses, and insects.
- Use of alien species such as the lodgepole pine (Pinus contorta) in forestry, potentially outcompeting the native Scots pine and Norway spruce.
- Invasive species, such as Carassius gibelio, Colpomenia peregrina, and Dasya baillouviana.
- Introduction of forest trees of foreign provenance of native species, potentially causing genetic pollution.
- Exploitation of hydroelectric power causing drastic changes in water-level dynamics, possibly leading to the loss of various vegetation types and species, particularly vascular plants.
- Draining of wet forests (home to most of forest species, in several categories) in connection with timber extraction.
- Draining of mires for peat extraction.
- Large-scale exploitation of mineral resources, such as limestone on Gotland and ultrabasic rock in the mountains are threats to rare and endangered organisms and landscapes.
- Removal of deciduous trees, which have key role in maintaining biodiversity in boreal forests.
- Overgrowth of (wet or dry) meadows and pastures.
- Removal of dead wood, along with fungi and insects.

Additionally, climate change is likely to affect the country's biodiversity, with the treeline moving further north and to higher altitudes, and forests replacing tundra. The melting of ice will increase runoff, affecting wetlands. With a rise in sea level, the Baltic Sea will receive a greater inflow of saline water.
