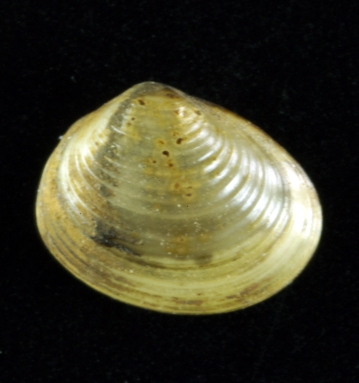

Conservation status
- Least Concern (IUCN 3.1) (Europe)

- Secure (NatureServe)

Scientific classification
- Kingdom: Animalia
- Phylum: Mollusca
- Class: Bivalvia
- Order: Sphaeriida
- Family: Sphaeriidae
- Genus: Pisidium
- Species: P. amnicum

Binomial name
- Pisidium amnicum (O. F. Müller, 1774)

= Pisidium amnicum =

Species of bivalve

Pisidium amnicum is a species of very small freshwater clam, sometimes known as the greater European peaclam or the River pea shell. It is an aquatic bivalve in the family Sphaeriidae.

== Description ==
Although only 9 mm (range 7–11 mm) in length, this species is considerably larger than most Pisidium species, and has a fairly thick, concentrically ridged shell. Its shell is solid, glossy, triangular-oval in shape, and has broad but not prominent umbos often coated with a dull ferruginous deposit. Its colour is grey-white to brown, often with a greenish cast.

== Distribution ==
Its native distribution is Palearctic. The species has been introduced to northeastern North America.

- Czech Republic – endangered (EN), endangered in Bohemia (EN), critically endangered in Moravia
- Slovakia
- Germany – highly endangered (Stark gefährdet)
- Nordic countries: Denmark, Finland, Iceland, Norway and Sweden (not in the Faroe Islands)
- Great Britain and Ireland

== Ecology ==
In Europe, it requires clean water and high levels of calcium.
