= Euglesa subtruncata =

- Drawing of the left valve internal view of Euglesa subtruncata
- Drawing of the right valve internal view of Euglesa subtruncata

Conservation status
- Least Concern (IUCN 3.1)

- Secure (NatureServe)

Scientific classification
- Kingdom: Animalia
- Phylum: Mollusca
- Class: Bivalvia
- Order: Sphaeriida
- Family: Sphaeriidae
- Genus: Euglesa
- Species: E. subtruncata

Binomial name
- Euglesa subtruncata (Malm, 1855)

Synonyms
- List: Cingulipisidium (Potamopisidium) poltavicum Korniushin, 1991; Euglesa (Cymatocyclas) supiniformis Pirogov & Starobogatov, 1974; Euglesa (Henslowiana) pirogovi Starobogatov, 1984; Euglesa (Henslowiana) tenuisculpta Pirogov & Starobogatov, 1975; Euglesa (Pseudeupera) alta (Mori, 1938); Euglesa (Pseudeupera) altaica (Krivosheina, 1979); Euglesa (Pseudeupera) arcidens Krivosheina, 1978; Euglesa (Pseudeupera) humerosa Pirogov & Starobogatov, 1975; Euglesa (Pseudeupera) humiliumbo Krivosheina, 1978; Euglesa (Pseudeupera) mucronata (Clessin, 1876); Euglesa (Pseudeupera) ovatorigona (Krivosheina, 1979); Euglesa (Pseudeupera) pallida (Gassies, 1855); Euglesa (Pseudeupera) parallelodon Krivosheina, 1978; Euglesa (Pseudeupera) pirogovi Starobogatov, 1984; Euglesa (Pseudeupera) poltavica (Korniushin, 1991); Euglesa (Pseudeupera) rotundotrigona Krivosheina, 1978; Euglesa (Pseudeupera) starobogatovi Krivosheina, 1978; Euglesa (Pseudeupera) subalta Starobogatov & Budnikova, 1985; Euglesa (Pseudeupera) subcuneata Krivosheina, 1978; Euglesa (Pseudeupera) subtruncata (Malm, 1855); Euglesa (Pseudeupera) supiniformis Pirogov & Starobogatov, 1974; Euglesa (Pseudeupera) talievi (Starobogatov & Streletzkaja, 1967); Euglesa (Pseudeupera) tenuicardo Krivosheina, 1978; Euglesa (Pseudeupera) tenuisculpta Pirogov & Starobogatov, 1975; Euglesa (Pseudeupera) turgida (Clessin, 1873); Euglesa (Pseudeupera) volgensis Pirogov & Starobogatov, 1975; Euglesa astrachanica Pirogov & Starobogatov, 1984; Euglesa difficilis Pirogov & Starobogatov, 1975; Euglesa humerosa Pirogov & Starobogatov, 1975; Euglesa subtruncata f. incrassata (Ellis, 1940); Euglesa tenuisculpta Pirogov & Starobogatov, 1975; Euglesa volgensis Pirogov & Starobogatov, 1975; Galileja talievi Starobogatov & Streletzkaja, 1967; Neopisidium altaicum Krivosheina, 1979; Neopisidium ovatotrigonum Krivosheina, 1979; Pisidium (Cyclocalyx) subtruncatum Malm, 1855; Pisidium (Eupera) landeroini Germain, 1909; Pisidium (Pseudeupera) subtruncatum Malm, 1855; Pisidium alpicola Suter, 1889; Pisidium apiculatum Sterki, 1922; Pisidium marci Sterki, 1909; Pisidium masci Ellis, 1962; Pisidium mucronatum Clessin, 1876; Pisidium overi Sterki, 1913; Pisidium pallidum Gassies, 1855; Pisidium subtruncatum Malm, 1855; Pisidium subtruncatum altum (Mori, 1938); Pisidium subtruncatum var. turgidum Clessin, 1873; Pseudeupera (Pseudeupera) altaica (Krivosheina, 1979); Pseudeupera (Pseudeupera) arcidens (Krivosheina, 1978); Pseudeupera (Pseudeupera) astrachanica (Pirogov & Starobogatov, 1984); Pseudeupera (Pseudeupera) humerosa (Pirogov & Starobogatov, 1975); Pseudeupera (Pseudeupera) humiliumbo (Krivosheina, 1978); Pseudeupera (Pseudeupera) mucronata (Clessin, 1876); Pseudeupera (Pseudeupera) ovatotrigona (Krivosheina, 1979); Pseudeupera (Pseudeupera) pallida (Gassies, 1855); Pseudeupera (Pseudeupera) parallelodon (Krivosheina, 1978); Pseudeupera (Pseudeupera) poltavica (Korniushin, 1991); Pseudeupera (Pseudeupera) recalva (Kuiper, 1960); Pseudeupera (Pseudeupera) rotundotrigona (Krivosheina, 1978); Pseudeupera (Pseudeupera) starobogatovi (Krivosheina, 1978); Pseudeupera (Pseudeupera) subalta (Starobogatov & Budnikova, 1985); Pseudeupera (Pseudeupera) subcuneata (Krivosheina, 1978); Pseudeupera (Pseudeupera) subtruncata (Malm, 1855); Pseudeupera (Pseudeupera) supiniformis (Pirogov & Starobogatov, 1974); Pseudeupera (Pseudeupera) talievi (Starobogatov & Streletzkaja, 1967); Pseudeupera (Pseudeupera) tenuicardo (Krivosheina, 1978); Pseudeupera (Pseudeupera) tenuisculpta (Pirogov & Starobogatov, 1975); Pseudeupera (Pseudeupera) turgida (Clessin, 1873); Pseudeupera (Pseudeupera) volgensis (Pirogov & Starobogatov, 1975)

Species of bivalve

Pisidium subtruncatum is a species of pill clam, a minute freshwater bivalve in the family Sphaeriidae.

== Description ==
The 2.7 – 4 mm shell is moderately tumid (swollen). In shape it is a strongly oblique oval. The umbos are prominent and well behind the middle. The surface is silky glossy with fine, irregular ribbing. In colour it is whitish to greyish.

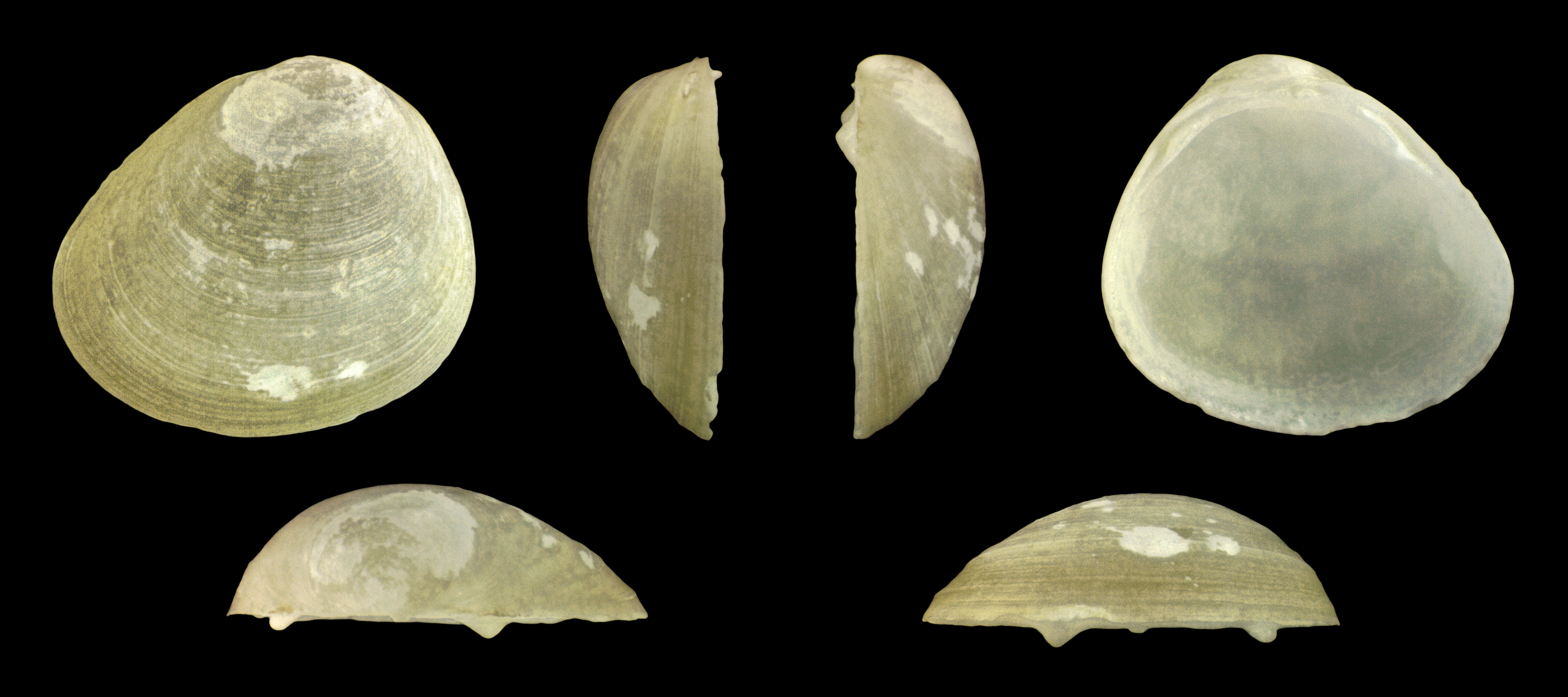
Right valve

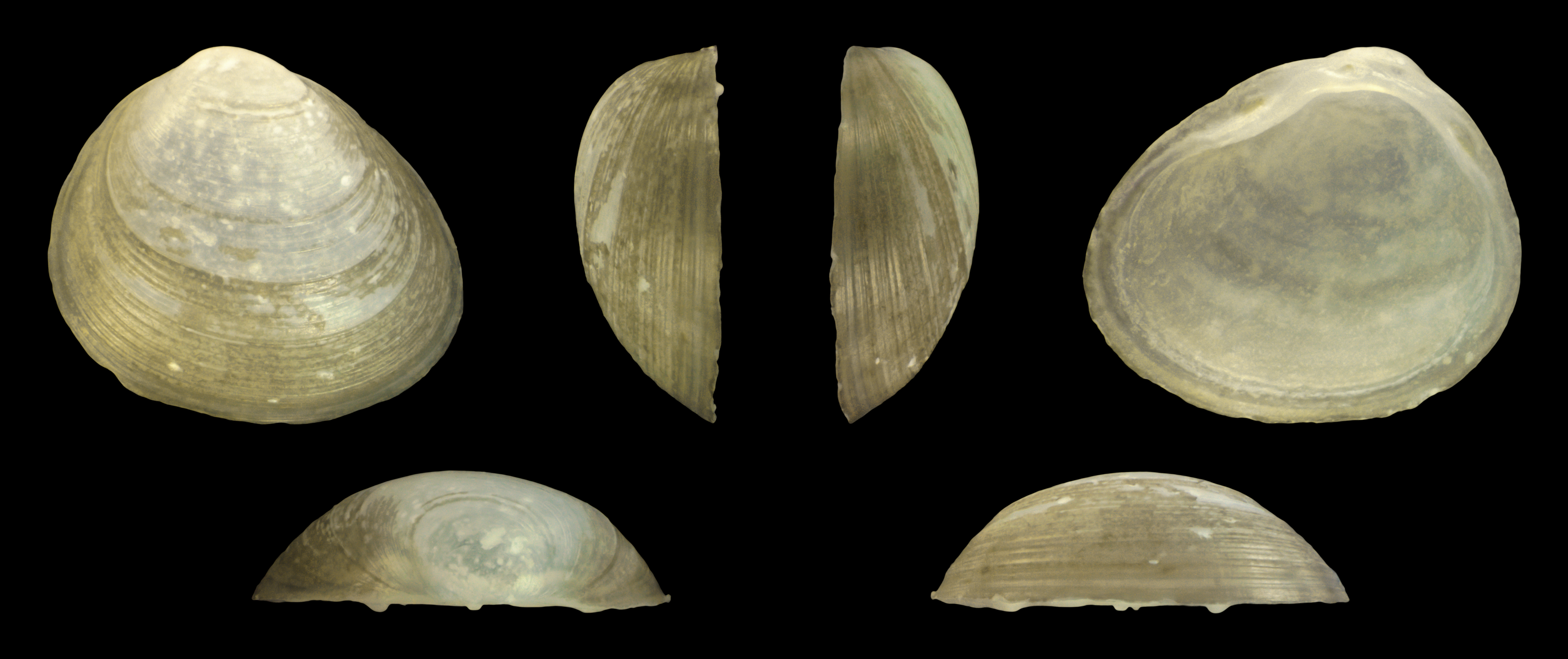
Left valve

== Distribution ==
Its native distribution is Holarctic.

- Czech Republic – in Bohemia, in Moravia, least concern (LC)
- Germany – distributed in whole Germany but in 2 states in red list (Rote Liste BRD).
- Nordic countries: Denmark, Faroes, Finland, Iceland, Norway and Sweden
- Great Britain and Ireland
