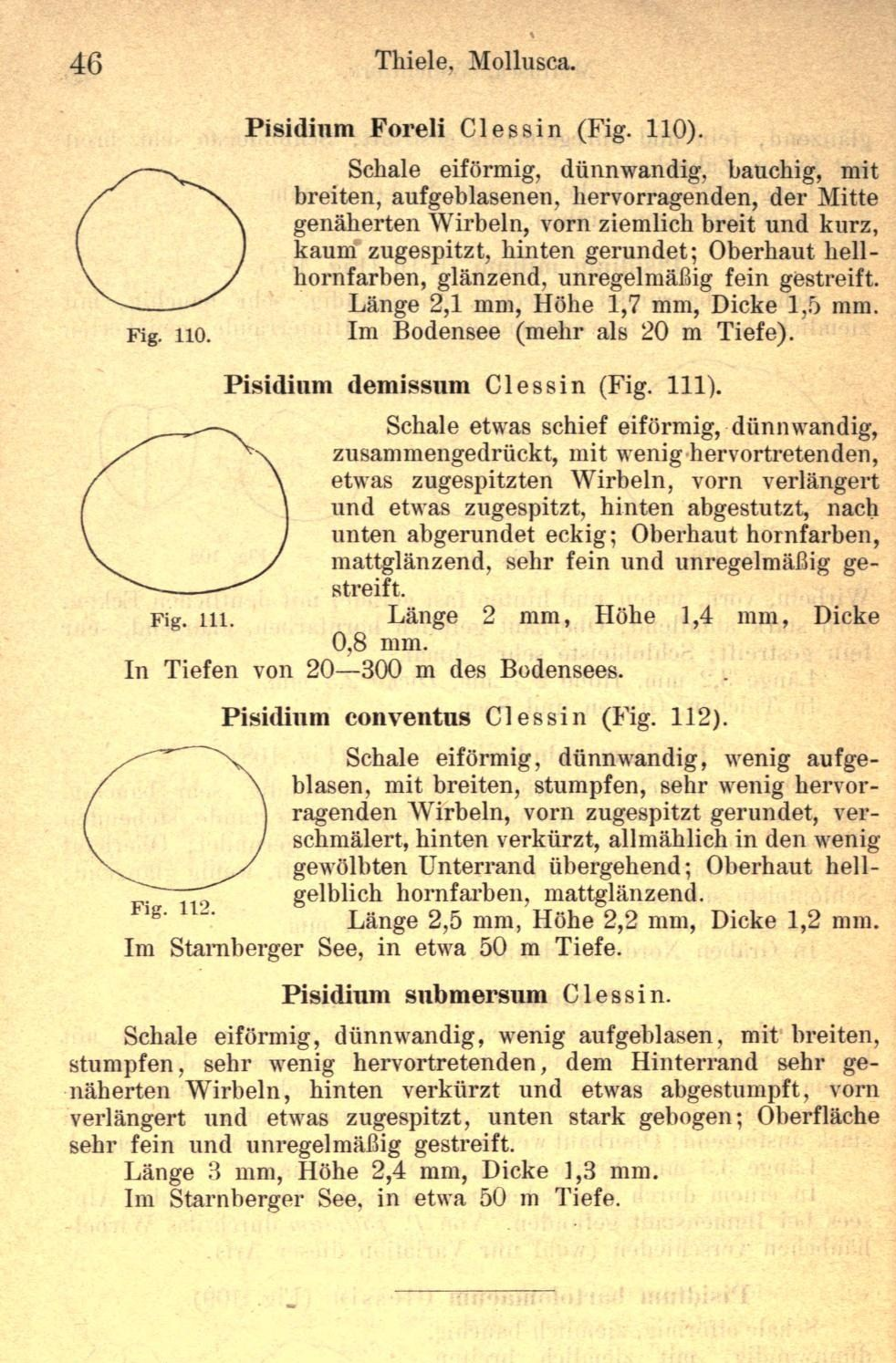

Conservation status
- Least Concern (IUCN 3.1)

- Secure (NatureServe)

Scientific classification
- Kingdom: Animalia
- Phylum: Mollusca
- Class: Bivalvia
- Order: Sphaeriida
- Family: Sphaeriidae
- Genus: Conventus
- Species: C. conventus

Binomial name
- Conventus conventus (Clessin, 1877)

Synonyms
- List: Conventus (Conventus) conventus (Clessin, 1877); Conventus (Conventus) urinator (Clessin, 1877); Conventus (Kurilipisidium) iturupensis Prozorova, 1997; Conventus (Kurilipisidium) occultus Prozorova, 1997; Conventus (Kurilipisidium) subtilis Prozorova, 1997; Cyclas errans Prime, 1869; Euglesa (Conventus) akkesiensis (Mori, 1938); Euglesa (Conventus) conventa (Clessin, 1877); Euglesa (Conventus) iturupensis (Prozorova, 1997); Euglesa (Conventus) occulta (Prozorova, 1997); Euglesa (Conventus) subtilis (Prozorova, 1997); Euglesa (Conventus) urinator (Clessin, 1877); Euglesa conventus (Clessin, 1887); Euglesa urinator (Clessin, 1877); Pisidium (Neopisidium) conventus Clessin, 1877; Pisidium abditum var. abyssorum Stimpson, 1874; Pisidium abortivum Sterki, 1916; Pisidium abortivum exiguum Sterki, 1916; Pisidium abortivum var. exiguum Sterki, 1916; Pisidium abyssorum Stimpson, 1898; Pisidium clessini Surbeck, 1899; Pisidium conventus Clessin, 1877; Pisidium conventus akkesiense Mori, 1938; Pisidium hendersoni Sterki, 1923; Pisidium imbecille Sterki, 1900; Pisidium notophthalmi Sterki, 1922; Pisidium tornense Odhner, 1908; Pisidium urinator Clessin, 1877; Pisidium urinator Clessin, 1876

= Conventus conventus =

Species of bivalve

Conventus conventus, the arctic-alpine pea clam, is a species of freshwater bivalve from the family Sphaeriidae.

== Description ==
The small (2.2–2.8 mm.) shell is oval in shape and thin and fragile. It is broad and flattened (laterally compressed) with flattened umbos near the midpoint. The colour is yellowish-white and the periostracum (surface) is silky with fine, concentric striation.

== Ecology ==
C. conventus is a relict of colder climatic periods found only in deep, cold, upland lakes.

== Distribution and conservation status ==
- Germany – endangered (gefährdet)
- Poland – vulnerable (VU)
- Nordic countries: Faroes, Finland, Norway and Sweden (not in Denmark, Iceland)
- Great Britain and Ireland
