= Odhneripisidium =

Scientific classification
- Kingdom: Animalia
- Phylum: Mollusca
- Class: Bivalvia
- Order: Sphaeriida
- Superfamily: Sphaerioidea
- Family: Sphaeriidae
- Genus: Odhneripisidium; Kuiper, 1962

Type species
- Pisidium stewarti Preston, 1909

Synonyms
- List: Neopisidium Odhner, 1921; Neopisidium (Europisidium) Starobogatov, 1984; Odhneripisidium (Europisidium) Starobogatov, 1984; Odhneripisidium (Kuiperipisidium) Izzatullaev & Starobogatov, 1986; Odhneripisidium (Odhneripisidium) Kuiper, 1962; Odhneripisidium (Tuvapisidium) Izzatullaev & Starobogatov, 1986; Odhneripisidium (Ussuripisidium) Izzatullaev & Starobogatov, 1986; Pisidium (Europisidium) Starobogatov, 1984; Pisidium (Kuiperipisidium) Izzatullaev & Starobogatov, 1986; Pisidium (Neopisidium) Odhner, 1921; Pisidium (Odheripisidium) Kuiper, 1962; Pisidium (Odhneripisidium) Kuiper, 1962

Genus of bivalves

Odhneripisidium is a genus of freshwater bivalves in the family Sphaeriidae. Species in this genus are known from Africa, Asia, Europe, and North and South America, including high altitude and arctic and subarctic regions.

== Species ==
This genus includes the following species:

- Odhneripisidium alexeii (Bößneck, Clewing & Albrecht, 2016)
- Odhneripisidium annandalei (Prashad, 1925)
- Odhneripisidium appressum (Prashad, 1933)
- Odhneripisidium australiense (Korniushin, 2000)
- Odhneripisidium behningi Izzatullaev & Starobogatov, 1986
- Odhneripisidium caucasus Bespalaya, Vinarski, Aksenova, Kondakov & Palatov, 2023
- Odhneripisidium cavernicum (Mori, 1938)
- Odhneripisidium chatyrkulense Izzatullaev & Starobogatov, 1986
- Odhneripisidium dammermani (Odhner, 1940)
- Odhneripisidium dancei (Kuiper, 1962)
- Odhneripisidium gafurovi Izzatullaev & Starobogatov, 1986
- Odhneripisidium issykkulense Izzatullaev & Starobogatov, 1986
- Odhneripisidium japonicum (Pilsbry & Hirase, 1908)
- Odhneripisidium khorense Izzatullaev & Starobogatov, 1986
- Odhneripisidium kuiperi (Dance, 1967)
- Odhneripisidium moitessierianum (Paladilhe, 1866)
- Odhneripisidium novobritanniae (Kuiper, 1967)
- Odhneripisidium pamirense Izzatullaev & Starobogatov, 1986
- Odhneripisidium parvum (Mori, 1938)
- Odhneripisidium popovae Starobogatov & Streletzkaja, 1967
- Odhneripisidium prasongi (Kuiper, 1974)
- Odhneripisidium stewarti (Preston, 1909)
- Odhneripisidium sumatranum (von Martens, 1897)
- Odhneripisidium tenuilineatum (Stelfox, 1918)
- Odhneripisidium uejii (Mori, 1938)
- Odhneripisidium yarkandense (Prashad, 1933)
