= Pisidium globulare =

Scientific classification
- Kingdom: Animalia
- Phylum: Mollusca
- Class: Bivalvia
- Order: Sphaeriida
- Family: Sphaeriidae
- Genus: Pisidium
- Species: P. globulare

Binomial name
- Pisidium globulare Clessin, 1873

Synonyms
- P. casertanum var. globulare (Clessin, 1873); Euglesa globularis

Species of bivalve

Pisidium globulare is a species of freshwater bivalve from the family Sphaeriidae.

== Distribution ==
- Czech Republic – in Bohemia, in Moravia
- Slovakia
- Germany – North Rhine-Westphalia, Schleswig-Holstein, Mecklenburg-Western Pomerania
- Latvia
- Sweden
- Ukraine
