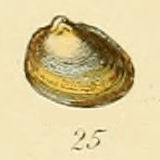

Conservation status
- Least Concern (IUCN 3.1)

- Secure (NatureServe)

Scientific classification
- Kingdom: Animalia
- Phylum: Mollusca
- Class: Bivalvia
- Order: Sphaeriida
- Family: Sphaeriidae
- Genus: Euglesa
- Species: E. henslowana

Binomial name
- Euglesa henslowana (Sheppard, 1825)

Synonyms
- List: Cyclas appendiculata Turton, 1831; Euglesa (Henslowiana) czerskii (Starobogatov & Streletzkaja, 1967); Euglesa (Henslowiana) dupuyana (Normand, 1854); Euglesa (Henslowiana) henslowana (Sheppard, 1825); Euglesa (Henslowiana) ostroumovi Pirogov & Starobogatov, 1974; Euglesa (Henslowiana) polonica Anistratenko & Starobogatov, 1990; Euglesa (Henslowiana) securridens Krivosheina, 1978; Euglesa (Henslowiana) subhenslowana Krivosheina, 1978; Euglesa (Henslowiana) suecica (Clessin, 1873); Euglesa henslowana f. inappendicula (Moquin-Tandon, 1855); Galileja czerskii Starobogatov & Streletzkaja, 1967; Galileja henslowana (Sheppard, 1825); Galileja henslowana karetovensis Starobogatov & Streletzkaja, 1967; Henslowiana (Henslowiana) czerskii (Starobogatov & Streletzkaja, 1967); Henslowiana (Henslowiana) dupuyana (Normand, 1854); Henslowiana (Henslowiana) henslowana (Sheppard, 1825); Henslowiana (Henslowiana) ostroumovi (Pirogov & Starobogatov, 1974); Henslowiana (Henslowiana) polonica (Anistratenko & Starobogatov, 1990); Henslowiana (Henslowiana) securridens (Krivosheina, 1978); Henslowiana (Henslowiana) subhenslowana (Krivosheina, 1978); Henslowiana (Henslowiana) suecica (Clessin, 1873); Pera appendiculata (Turton, 1831); Pera henslowana (Sheppard, 1823); Pisidium (Tropidocyclas) henslowanum (Sheppard, 1825); Pisidium bonnafouxianum de Cessac, 1855; Pisidium dupuyanum Normand, 1854; Pisidium henslowaniana Jenyns, 1832; Pisidium henslowanum (Sheppard, 1825); Pisidium henslowanum var. bedoti Piaget, 1913; Pisidium henslowanum var. suecicum Clessin, 1873; Pisidium henslowianum var. elongatum Clessin, 1874; Pisidium henslowianum var. pulchrum Clessin, 1874; Pisidium henslowianum var. solidum Clessin, 1874; Tellina henslowana Sheppard, 1825

= Euglesa henslowana =

Species of bivalve

Euglesa henslowana is a species of very small freshwater clam or pea clam, an aquatic bivalve mollusc in the family Sphaeriidae. It is commonly referred to as the Henslow peaclam.

== Etymology ==
The specific name honours John Stevens Henslow.

== Description ==
The shell is obliquely oval. It has prominent, narrow umbos well behind the middle and the umbos have oblique raised crests. The surface (periostracum) is silky with fine, even concentric striae. The colour is greyish, especially at the umbos. Widespread but local and uncommon. The size is 3.5-5mm.

== Distribution ==
Its native distribution is Holarctic.

- Czech Republic – in Bohemia, in Moravia, least concern (LC)
- Slovakia
- Germany – (Arten der Vorwarnliste)
- Nordic countries: Denmark, Faroes, Finland, Norway and Sweden (not in Iceland)
- Great Britain and Ireland
