= Pettancylus tanganyicensis =

Conservation status
- Least Concern (IUCN 3.1)

Scientific classification
- Kingdom: Animalia
- Phylum: Mollusca
- Class: Gastropoda
- Superorder: Hygrophila
- Family: Planorbidae
- Genus: Pettancylus
- Species: P. tanganyicensis

Binomial name
- Pettancylus tanganyicensis (E. A. Smith, 1906)

Synonyms
- Ancylus tanganyicensis E. A. Smith, 1906; Ferrissia tanganyicensis (E. A. Smith, 1906)

Species of gastropod

Pettancylus tanganyicensis is a species of small freshwater snail or limpet, an aquatic gastropod in the family Planorbidae.

== Distribution ==
This species is only found in Lake Tanganyika in Burundi, the Democratic Republic of the Congo, Tanzania, and Zambia.

== See also ==
- List of non-marine molluscs of Tanzania
