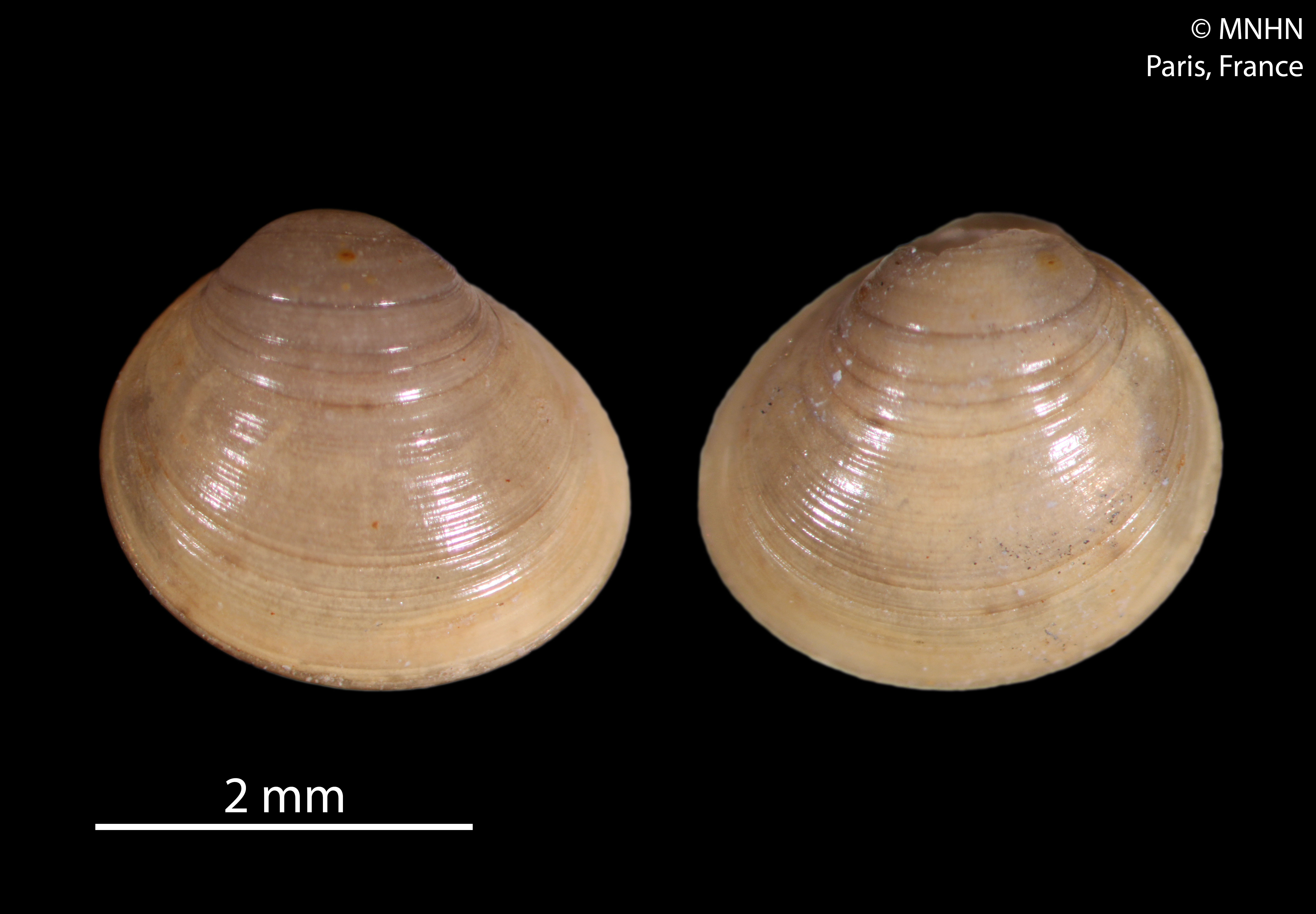

Conservation status
- Least Concern (IUCN 3.1)

Scientific classification
- Kingdom: Animalia
- Phylum: Mollusca
- Class: Bivalvia
- Order: Sphaeriida
- Family: Sphaeriidae
- Genus: Euglesa
- Species: E. hinzi

Binomial name
- Euglesa hinzi (Kuiper, 1975)

= Euglesa hinzi =

Species of bivalve

Euglesa hinzi is a species of mollusc belonging to the family Sphaeriidae.

It is native to Northern Europe.

Synonym:

- Pisidium hinzi Kuiper, 1975 (= basionym)
