= Pettancylus clessiniana =

Scientific classification
- Kingdom: Animalia
- Phylum: Mollusca
- Class: Gastropoda
- Superorder: Hygrophila
- Family: Planorbidae
- Subfamily: Ancylinae
- Tribe: Ancylini
- Genus: Pettancylus
- Species: P. clessiniana

Binomial name
- Pettancylus clessiniana (Jickeli, 1882)

Synonyms
- Ancylus clessiniana Jickeli, 1882 (original combination); Ferrissia clessiniana (Jickeli, 1882); Ferrissia (Pettancylus) clessiniana (Jickeli, 1882)

Species of gastropod

Pettancylus clessiniana is a species of mollusc belonging to the family Planorbidae.

It is native to Western Europe.
