= Odhneripisidium moitessierianum =

Conservation status
- Least Concern (IUCN 3.1)

- Secure (NatureServe)

Scientific classification
- Kingdom: Animalia
- Phylum: Mollusca
- Class: Bivalvia
- Order: Sphaeriida
- Family: Sphaeriidae
- Genus: Odhneripisidium
- Species: O. moitessierianum

Binomial name
- Odhneripisidium moitessierianum (Paladilhe, 1866)

Synonyms
- List: Neopisidium moitessierianum (Paladilhe, 1866); Neopisidium torquatum (Stelfox, 1918); Neopisidium trigonum (Locard, 1893); Pisidium (Neopisidium) moitessierianum Paladilhe, 1866; Pisidium (Neopisidium) torquatum Stelfox, 1918; Pisidium (Neopisidium) trigonum Locard, 1893; Pisidium (Odhneripisidium) moitesserianum Paladilhe, 1866; Pisidium moitessierianum Paladilhe, 1866; Pisidium torquatum Stelfox, 1918; Pisidium trigonum Locard, 1893

Species of bivalve

Odhneripisidium moitessierianum is a species of small freshwater clam. It is an aquatic bivalve mollusc in the family Sphaeriidae.

== Description ==
This species is the smallest of the pea clams or and the smallest of any freshwater bivalve, at 1.5 – 2.5 mm adult size. The shell is long-oval and oblique wedge-shaped with prominent umbos which are slightly behind the midpoint. The umbos are demarcated by a shallow furrow. The surface (periostracum) is silky, with regular concentric striae.

Drawing of the right valve external view of Odhneripisidium moitessierianum.

Drawing of the right valve lateral view of Odhneripisidium moitessierianum.

Drawing of the right valve internal view of Odhneripisidium moitessierianum.

== Distribution ==
The species is native to Europe but has been introduced to northeastern North America.

- Czech Republic – in Bohemia, in Moravia, - endangered (EN)
- Slovakia
- Germany – endangered (gefährdet)
- Nordic countries: Denmark, Finland, Norway and Sweden (not in Faroes, Iceland)
- Great Britain and Ireland
