= Euglesa =

Scientific classification
- Kingdom: Animalia
- Phylum: Mollusca
- Class: Bivalvia
- Order: Sphaeriida
- Family: Sphaeriidae
- Genus: Euglesa; Jenyns, 1832

Genus of bivalves

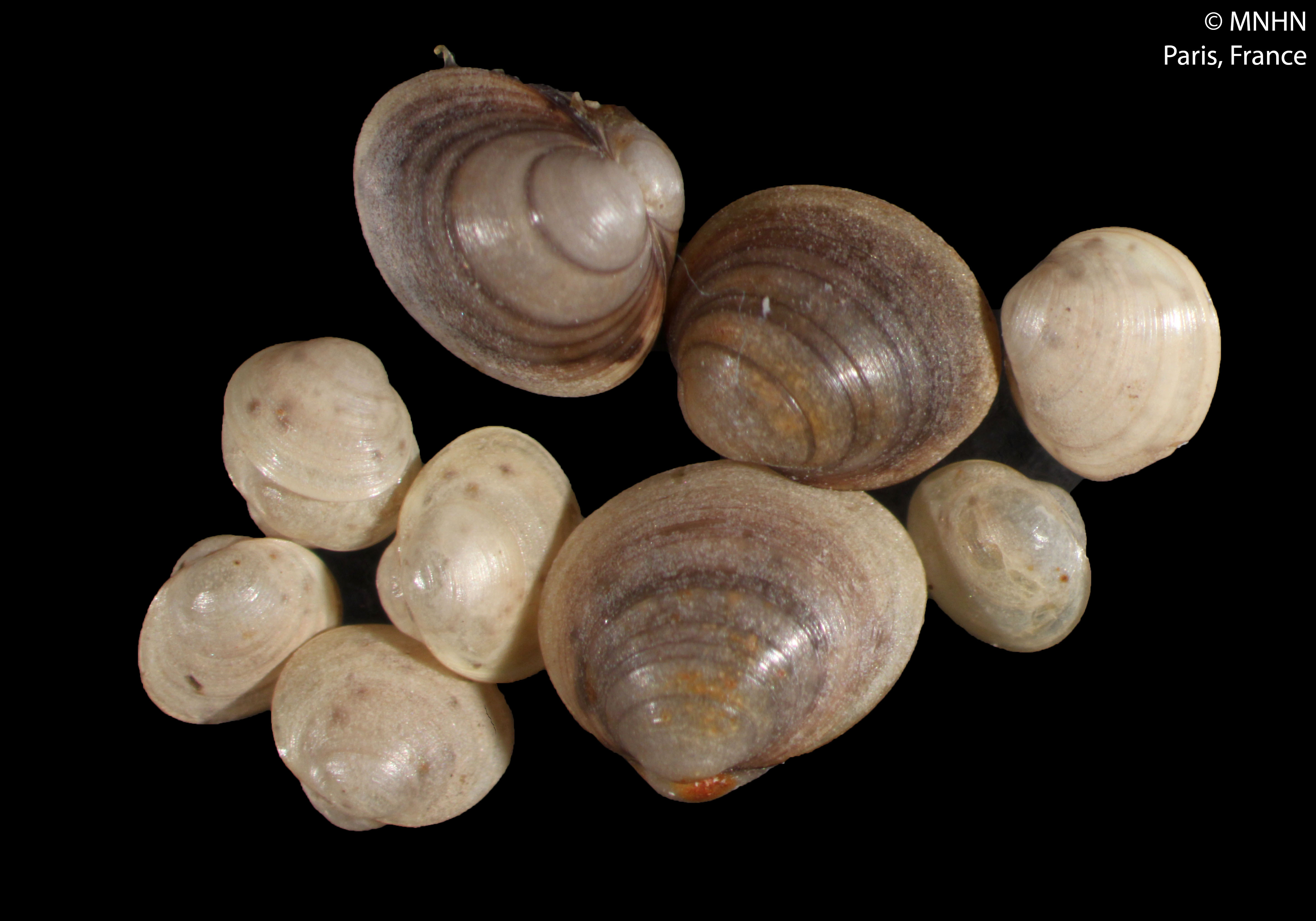
Euglesa waldeni

Euglesa is a genus of bivalves belonging to the family Sphaeriidae.

Species:

- Euglesa adamsi (Prime, 1851)
- Euglesa atkinsoniana (Theobald, 1876)
- Euglesa cara (Cotton, 1953)
- Euglesa casertana (Poli, 1791)
- Euglesa cavatica (Zhadin, 1952)
- Euglesa centrale (Korniushin, 2000)
- Euglesa chankensis (Likharev in Zhadin, 1952)
- Euglesa clausi Korniushin, 2006
- Euglesa compressa (Prime, 1852)
- Euglesa conventus (Clessin, 1887)
- Euglesa coreana (Kwon, 1990)
- Euglesa edlaueri (Kuiper, 1960)
- Euglesa equilateralis (Prime, 1852)
- Euglesa etheridgei (E.A. Smith, 1882)
- Euglesa ethiopica (Korniushin, 1995)
- Euglesa fallax (Sterki, 1896)
- Euglesa ferruginea (Prome, 1852)
- Euglesa floresiana (B. Rensch, 1934)
- Euglesa fultoni (Kuiper, 1983)
- Euglesa globularis (Clessin, 1873)
- Euglesa granum (Lindholm, 1909)
- Euglesa gurvichi Izzatullaev & Starobogatov, 1985
- Euglesa hallae (Kuiper, 1983)
- Euglesa henslowana (Sheppard, 1825)
- Euglesa hinzi (Kuiper, 1975)
- Euglesa interstitialis (Bössneck, Groh & Richling, 2020)
- Euglesa korniushini Frolov, 2010
- Euglesa kosciusko (Iredale, 1943)
- Euglesa lilljeborgii (Clessin in Esmark & Hoyer, 1886)
- Euglesa ljovuschkini (Starobogatov, 1962)
- Euglesa lyudmilae Frolov, 2010
- Euglesa maasseni (Kuiper, 1987)
- Euglesa milium (Held, 1836)
- Euglesa mongolica Slugina & Starobogatov, 2001
- Euglesa novaezelandiae (Prime, 1862)
- Euglesa paludosa (T. Hutton, 1849)
- Euglesa personata (Malm, 1855)
- Euglesa ponderi (Korniushin, 2000)
- Euglesa ponderosa (Stelfox, 1918)
- Euglesa pulchella (Jenyns, 1832)
- Euglesa sarmatica Anistratenko, 1991 †
- Euglesa semenkevitschi (Lindholm, 1909)
- Euglesa shcherbinai Frolov, 2010
- Euglesa subtruncata (Malm, 1855)
- Euglesa tasmanica (Tenison Woods, 1876)
- Euglesa trigonoides (W. Dybowski, 1902)
- Euglesa waldeni (Kuiper, 1975)
- Euglesa zugmayeri (Weber, 1910)
