= Riccardoella limacum =

Scientific classification
- Kingdom: Animalia
- Phylum: Arthropoda
- Subphylum: Chelicerata
- Class: Arachnida
- Order: Trombidiformes
- Family: Ereynetidae
- Genus: Riccardoella
- Species: R. limacum

Binomial name
- Riccardoella limacum (Schrank, 1776)

Species of mite

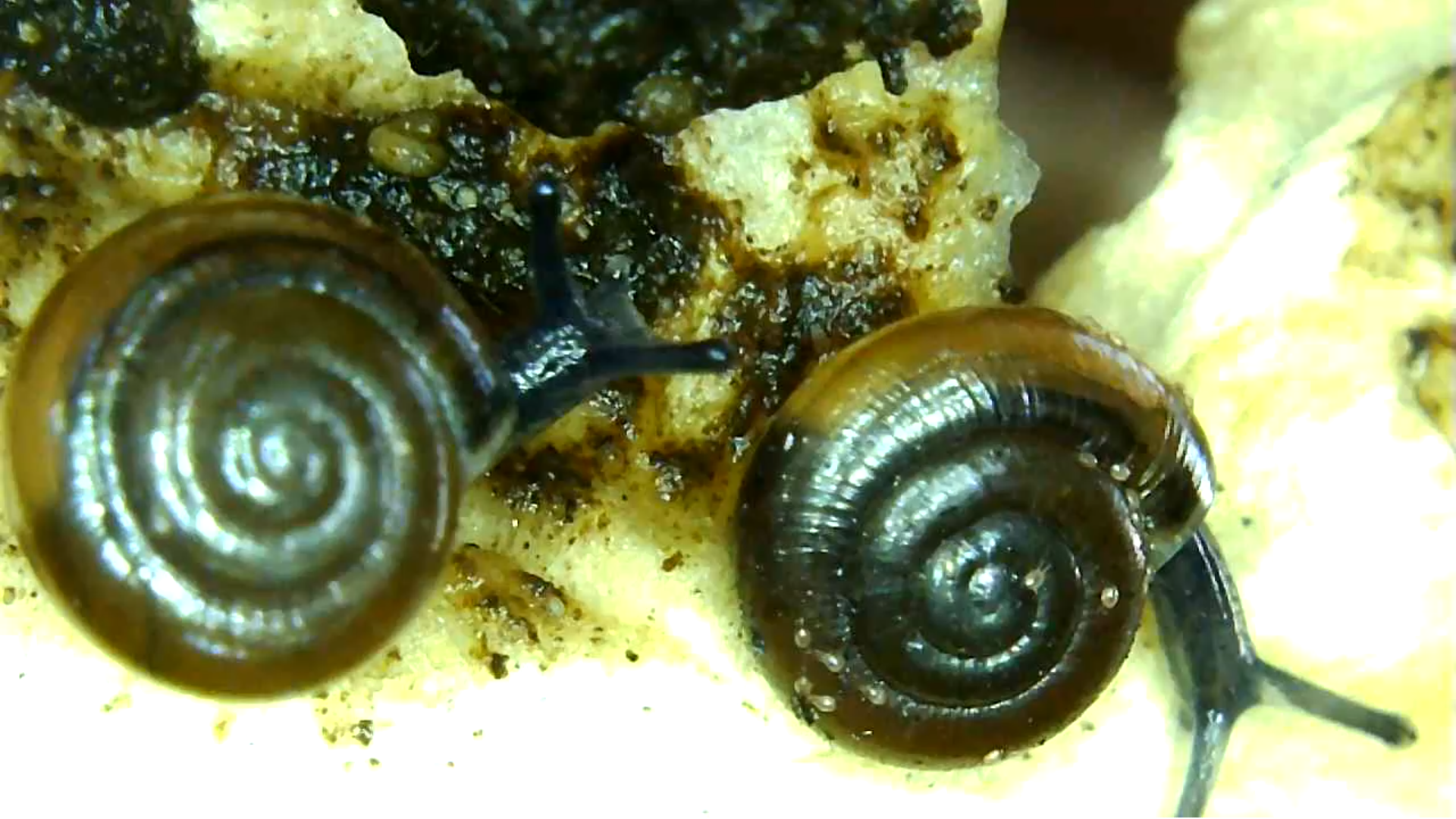
Riccardoella limacum infesting an Oxychilus sp. snail

Riccardoella limacum or the white snail mite is a member of the Acari (mite) taxon which is parasitic primarily on snails. Slug mites are very small (less than 0.5 mm in length), white, and can be seen to move very rapidly over the surface of their host, particularly under the shell rim and near the pulmonary aperture. While once thought to be benign mucophages, more recent studies have shown that they actually subsist on the host's blood, and may bore into the host's body to feed.

Studies have shown that this species name has been frequently misapplied to the more widespread Riccardoella oudemansi, the white slug mite. Despite its name, R. limacum is typically a restricted parasite of snails, while R. oudemansi is the common species on slugs, although it occasionally feeds on snails too.

== Hosts ==
Mite infection among gastropod populations varies greatly. Dense gastropod population favors infection; isolated populations may remain uninfected. Older and larger gastropods are more likely to show infection. Mites have been observed to move from host to host when hosts mate, and when gastropods congregate in moist soil and under rocks during the day. It has been shown that mites move preferentially towards fresh mucus when they travel along mucus, enabling them to follow mucus trails to new hosts. Once infected, individual gastropods take longer to mature and show reduced mating, activity, and feeding. Infected slugs and snails lay fewer eggs than uninfected individuals. Infected gastropods also show decreased winter survival rates.

At least 31 species of mollusks are exploited. Common hosts include the following:

Note that, as recent studies show that R. limacum is usually limited to snails, this host list deserves revision.

- Deroceras agreste
- Arianta arbustorum
- Arion ater
- Arion hortensis
- Cornu aspersum
- Helix pomatia
- Limax maximus
- Milax budapestensis
- Milax gagates
- Milax sowerbyi
- Oxychilus draparnaudi

== Taxonomy ==
The slug mite was first identified in 1710 by entomologist René Antoine Ferchault de Réaumur. Three species were subsequently named, though they were synonymized as Riccardoella limacum in 1946.

== Life cycle ==
Slug mites are a one-host mite. It is possible for a mite to be born, live, and die on a single host.

Mites have two sexes. Their five-stage life cycle is as follows: Females lay eggs in the host lung, and then the eggs hatch in 8–12 days as six-legged larva in the lungs of hosts and undergo three nymph stages. The whole life cycle can take place in 20 days under ideal conditions. Eggs do not hatch while the host is hibernating.

== Economic impact and treatment ==
Slug mites are a concern for commercial and hobbyist breeders of snails; as few as six mites can sicken an individual and make it susceptible to infection by threadworms and bacteria such as Pseudomonas aeruginosa. Countermeasures include regular washing and introduction of Hypoaspis miles, a predatory species of mite which feeds upon slug mites.

== Other sources ==
- Baur B. and Schupbach H.U. (2008). "Parasitic mites influence fitness components of their host, the land snail arianta arbustrorum". Invertebrate biology, 127 (3), 350–356
- Baur A. and Baur B. (2005). "Interpopulation variation in the prevalence and intensity of parasitic mite infection in the land snail Arianta arbustrum". Invertebrate biology 124 (3), 194-201
