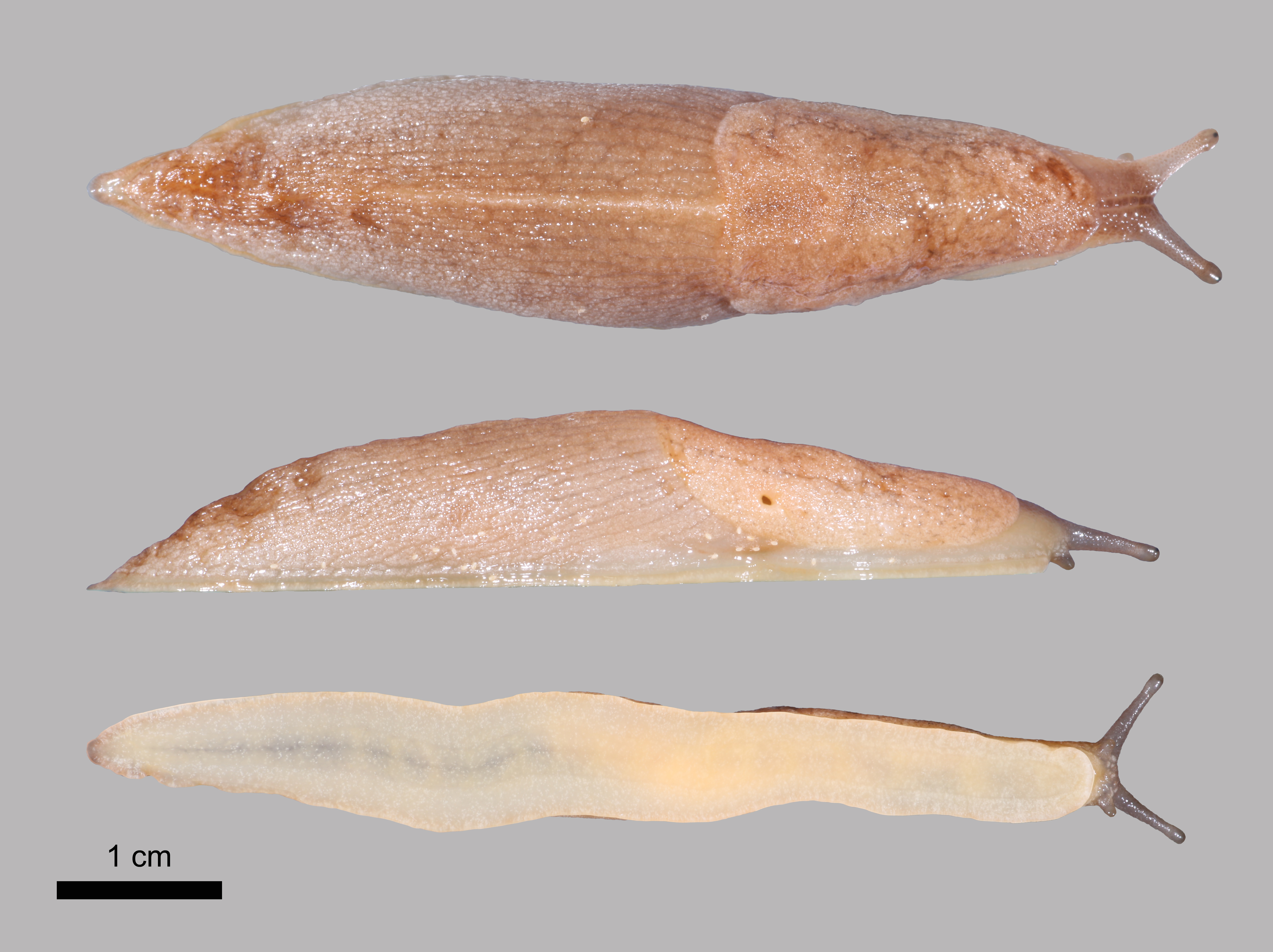

Conservation status
- Least Concern (IUCN 3.1)

Scientific classification
- Kingdom: Animalia
- Phylum: Mollusca
- Class: Gastropoda
- Order: Stylommatophora
- Family: Milacidae
- Genus: Tandonia
- Species: T. kusceri

Binomial name
- Tandonia kusceri (H. Wagner, 1931)

Synonyms
- Milax kusceri H. Wagner, 1931; Milax balcanicus Grossu & Lupu, 1961; Milax longipenis Grossu & Lupu, 1961; Milax bojanensis Hudec, 1964

= Tandonia kusceri =

Species of mollusc

Tandonia kusceri is a species of slug belonging to the family Milacidae.

== Identification ==
Tandonia kusceri has the long keel continuing up to the mantle that is typical of the Milacidae and is pale pinky brown, usually with small black spots. It is thus liable to be confused with its close relative Tandonia rustica, requiring dissection for reliable distinction. Tandonia kusceri is distinct from this and other Tandonia species in having a very long epiphallus, five or more times as long as the penis. Another externally similar species is Tandonia serbica; it has been questioned whether it is truly distinct from T. kusceri. Length of crawling individuals up to 100 mm (3.9 in). Specimens preserved in alcohol lose the pink colouration.

== Distribution ==
The species is believed to be native to parts of the Balkans (Bulgaria, the European part of Turkey, northern Greece, North Macedonia, Serbia) and eastern Romania. It has been introduced more widely:

- It was reported in the Odessa region of Ukraine already in 1902, which might or might not represent an introduction. In 1998 it was observed in the Mykolaiv region and in 2004 in the Crimea. The first record from further west, in the Transcarpathian region, was in 2018, and it continues to spread further.
- Croatia (garden in Dubrovnik) in 1972
- Montenegro since 2000
- Moldova since 2011
- Slovakia since 2014
- Samothraki Island in Greece since 2017
- Hungary, widely distributed when first noted in 2019
- Austria since 2020
- In the Caucasus region, there are records from both Russia and Georgia (both in 2021).
- In the USA it was reported from a Chicago garden in 2013.
- In Canada, there are numerous records from Ontario from 2017 onwards.
