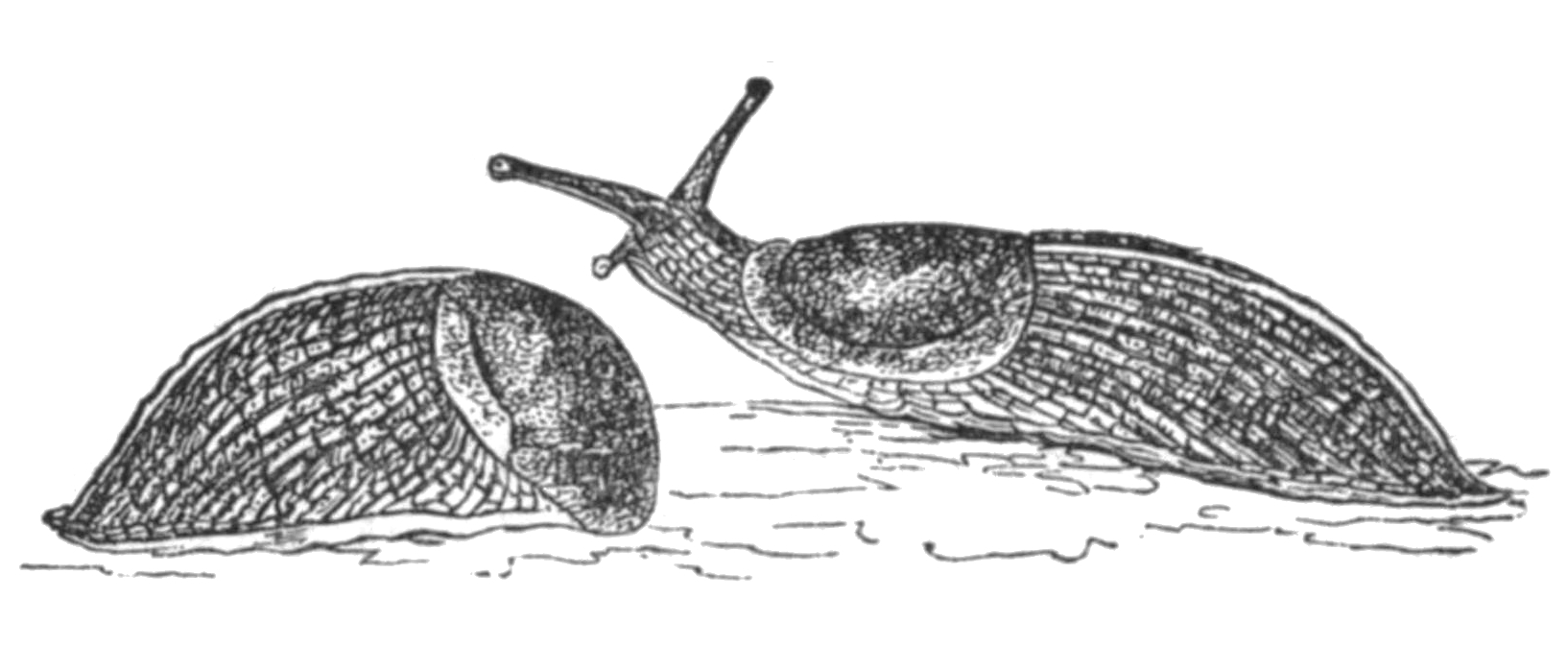
- Drawings of Tandonia sowerbyi, contracted (left) and active (right)
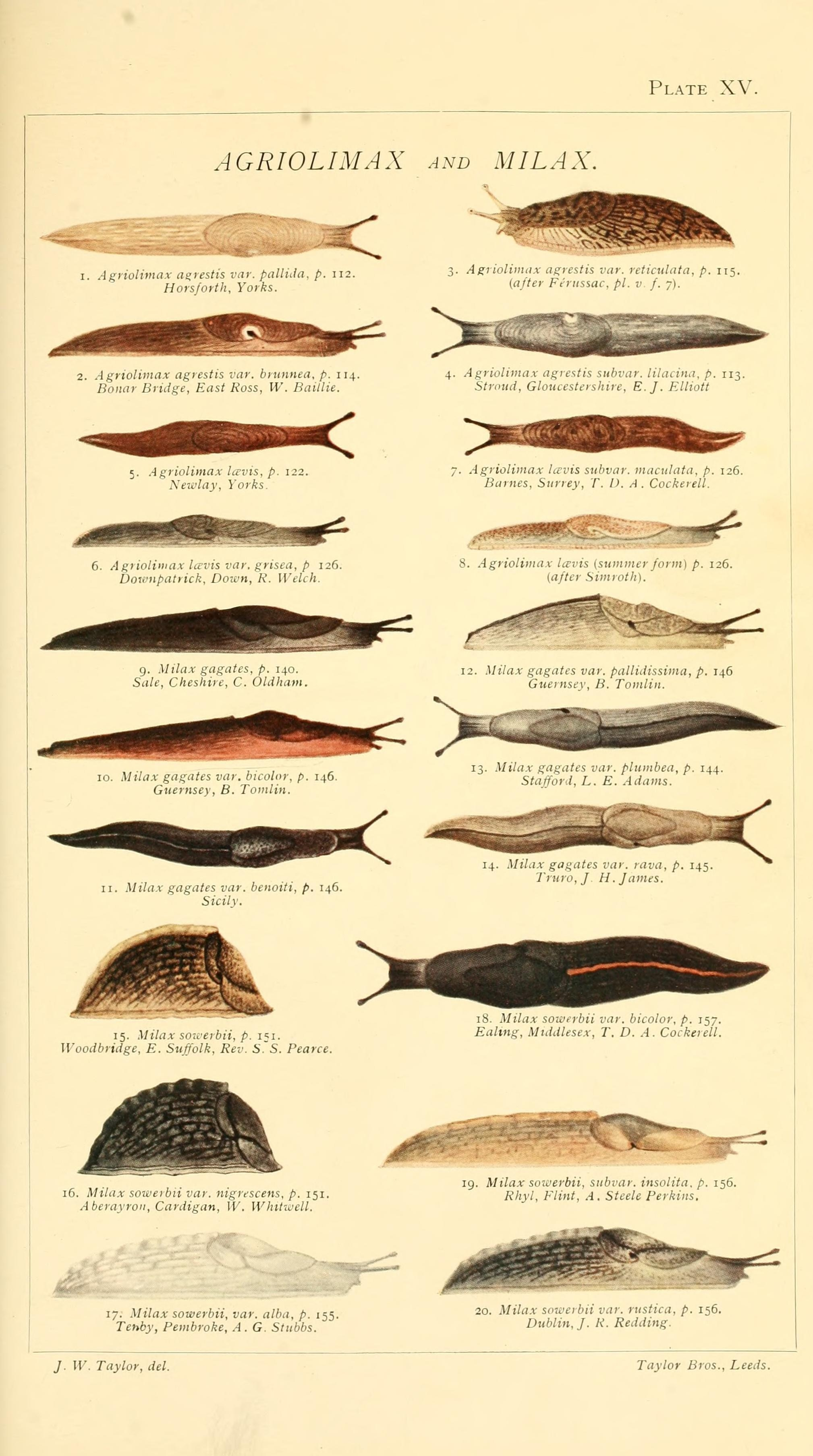

Conservation status
- Least Concern (IUCN 3.1)

Scientific classification
- Kingdom: Animalia
- Phylum: Mollusca
- Class: Gastropoda
- Order: Stylommatophora
- Family: Milacidae
- Genus: Tandonia
- Species: T. sowerbyi

Binomial name
- Tandonia sowerbyi (Férussac, 1823)

= Tandonia sowerbyi =

Species of gastropod

Tandonia sowerbyi is a species of air-breathing, keeled, land slug, a shell-less terrestrial gastropod mollusk in the family Milacidae.

== Description ==
This is a keeled slug attained 80 mm (3.1 in) in length.

== Habitat ==
This slug occurs in open habitats such as grasslands and shrublands; it can be abundant in arable land and gardens.

== Distribution ==
This slug is native to Europe, likely originally only to Greece. It is now widespread in southeastern and Atlantic Europe:

- Great Britain
- Ireland
- Italy
- Portugal
- The Netherlands
- The Balkans

It is also present in:

- New Zealand
- South America

This species has not yet become established in the USA, but it is considered to represent a potentially serious threat as a pest, an invasive species which could negatively affect agriculture, natural ecosystems, human health or commerce. Therefore it has been suggested that this species be given top national quarantine significance in the USA.
