= Milax nigricans =

Conservation status
- Least Concern (IUCN 3.1)

Scientific classification
- Kingdom: Animalia
- Phylum: Mollusca
- Class: Gastropoda
- Order: Stylommatophora
- Family: Milacidae
- Genus: Milax
- Species: M. nigricans

Binomial name
- Milax nigricans (Philippi, 1836)

Species of gastropod

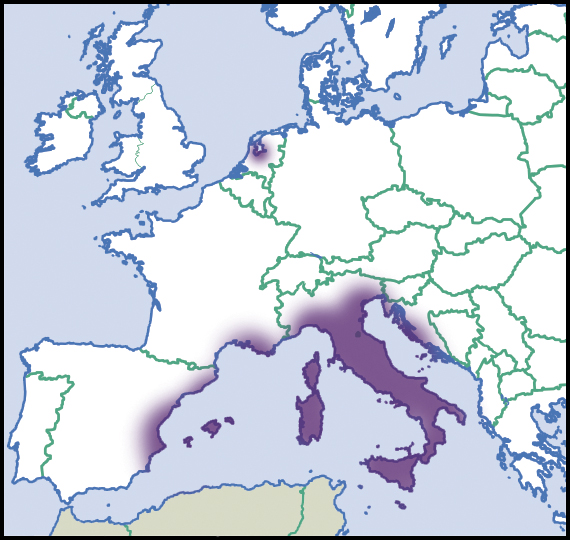
Distribution in Europe (missing Hungarian and N. French records)

Milax nigricans is a Mediterranean species of terrestrial slug in the family Milacidae.

== Description ==
Extended length is up to 75 mm. As in other species of the family Milacidae, a prominent raised keel runs along the midline of the body from the back of the mantle to the tip of the tail. Milax nigricans is not distinguishable from Milax gagates on the basis of external characters: Milax nigricans is often black but can be a much paler grey even within the same population, and M. gagates can also be black.

The most reliable anatomical character is the stimulator in the atrium of the distal genitalia. In M. nigricans, numerous large papillae protrude from one side of the stimulator, whereas in M. gagates, if there are any such papillae at all, they are few, small, and restricted to the distal half of the stimulator. Other internal characters are less reliable.

Suggestions that M. nigricans and M. gagates are conspecific (e.g.) have subsequently been refuted by studies of DNA.

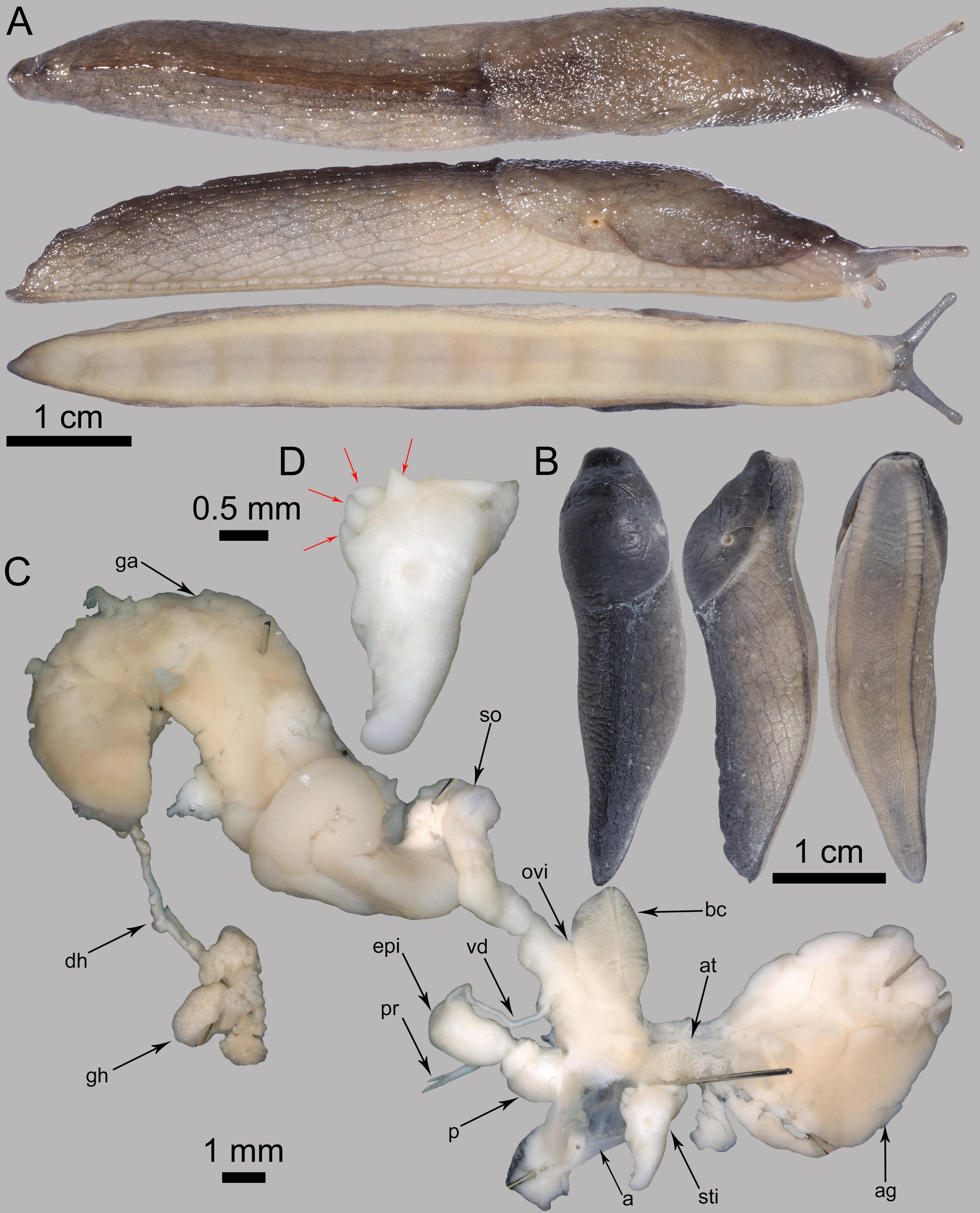
Living individual (A), preserved specimen (B), reproductive anatomy (C), atrium stimulator (D) with some of the papillae marked with red arrows. Abbreviations: a = atrium, ag = atrium glandula, at = atrium tubuli, bc = bursa copulatrix, dh = ductus hermaphroditicus, epi = epiphallus, ga = glandula albuminalis, gh = glandula hermaphroditica, ovi = oviductus, p = penis, pr = penis retractor, so = sperm-oviductus, sti = (atrial) stimulator, vd = vas deferens. Photography: Ágnes Turóci.

== Distribution ==
Milax nigricans is often abundant around the Mediterranean, especially in disturbed habitats: North Africa, Malta, Sicily, mainland Italy, Croatia, Sardinia, Corsica, southern France, Balearic Islands, northern and eastern mainland Spain, Canary Islands. In addition, local populations have been introduced further north in Europe and may persist: southern England (one record only), Munich, northern France, the Netherlands, Hungary. Other records based only on external appearance are liable to be the more widely distributed M. gagates and should be considered unreliable. There are indications of the long-distance dispersal of M. nigricans on both fresh produce and potted garden plants.

== Karyotype ==
Milax nigricans has a chromosome number of 2n = 66.
