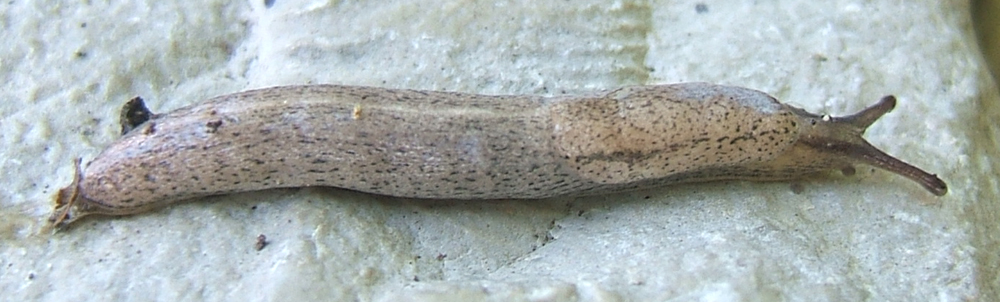

Conservation status
- Least Concern (IUCN 3.1)

Scientific classification
- Kingdom: Animalia
- Phylum: Mollusca
- Class: Gastropoda
- Order: Stylommatophora
- Family: Milacidae
- Genus: Tandonia
- Species: T. rustica

Binomial name
- Tandonia rustica (Millet, 1843)

Synonyms
- Limax rustica Millet, 1843; Milax sowerbii var. rustica

= Tandonia rustica =

Species of gastropod

Tandonia rustica is a species of air-breathing, keeled, land slug, a shell-less terrestrial gastropod mollusc in the family Milacidae.

== Description ==
This is a keeled slug that reaches 70 mm–100 mm. long. It is whitish in colour creamy or reddish to yellowish grey with numerous black dots. The mantle is 40% of body length (preserved specimens). The mantle is granular with a deep but not conspicuous horseshoe-shaped groove with black streaks. The breathing pore has a pale rim. The keel is yellowish to white. The sole is cream.

The penis and epiphallus form a single long cylindrical organ: penis with a swelling anteriorly, inside with a richly ornamented papilla, epiphallus obviously longer than penis. The vas deferens opens symmetrically, the spermatheca is elongate with a sharp pointed end, its duct slightly shorter and with a swelling half-way. The vagina is not much wider than the oviduct, accessory glands are compact duct-like canals, surrounding and opening to the anterior end of the vagina, The atrium is short.(Francisco Welter Schultes)

== Distribution ==
This slug is native to Central Europe (Austria, Czech Republic, France, Germany, Italy, Liechtenstein, Luxembourg, Poland, Romania, Slovenia, and Switzerland); it has spread/been introduced much wider (Belgium, Croatia, Corsica, Great Britain, Hungary, Ireland, Slovakia, and the Netherlands).

This species has not yet become established in the USA, but it is considered to represent a potentially serious threat as a pest, an invasive species which could negatively affect agriculture, natural ecosystems, human health or commerce. Therefore, it has been suggested that this species be given top national quarantine significance in the USA.

== Habitat ==
Deciduous and mixed forests on mountain slopes with limestone rock rubble, also in open habitats on calcareous soils.
