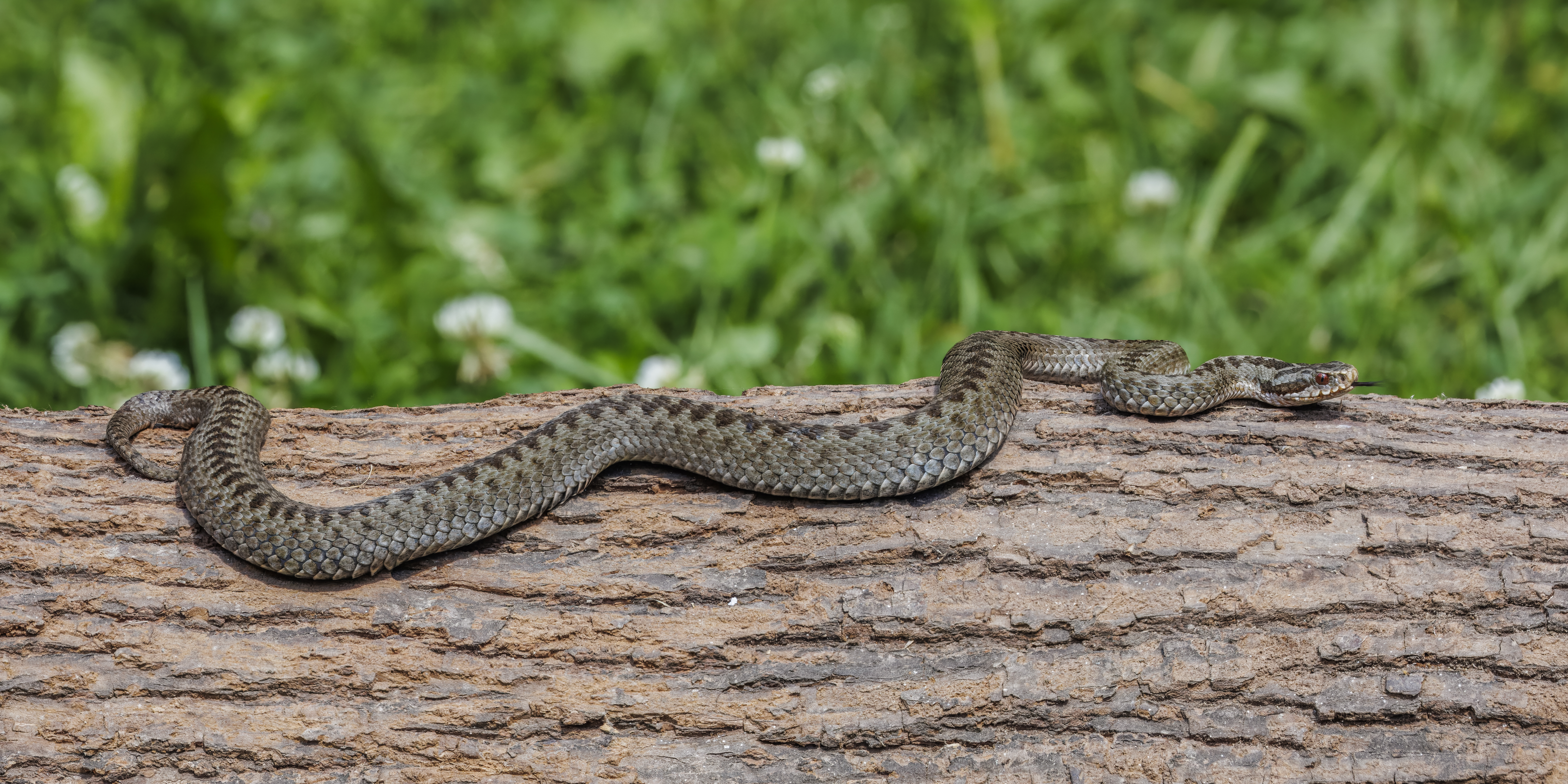
- Female, Slovakia

Conservation status
- Least Concern (IUCN 3.1)

Scientific classification
- Kingdom: Animalia
- Phylum: Chordata
- Class: Reptilia
- Order: Squamata
- Suborder: Serpentes
- Family: Viperidae
- Genus: Vipera
- Species: V. berus

Binomial name
- Vipera berus (Linnaeus, 1758)

Synonyms
- Species synonymy: [Coluber] berus Linnaeus, 1758; [Coluber] Chersea Linnaeus, 1758; Coluber prester Linnaeus, 1761; Coluber vipera Anglorum Laurenti, 1768; Coluber Melanis Pallas, 1771; Coluber Scytha Pallas, 1773; C[oluber]. Scytha — Bonnaterre, 1790; Vipera melanis — Sonnini & Latreille, 1801; Vipera berus — Daudin, 1803; Vipera chersea — Daudin, 1803; Vipera prester — Daudin, 1803; [Coluber] Caeruleus Sheppard, 1804; Vipera communis Leach, 1817; Coluber chersea var. marasso Pollini, 1818; [Pelias] berus — Merrem, 1820; [Vipera] marasso — Sette, 1821; Vipera limnaea Bendiscioli, 1826; Vipera trilamina Millet, 1828; [Pelias] Chersea — Wagler, 1830; Vipera torva Lenz, 1832; Pelias dorsalis Gray, 1842; V[ipera]. Prester var. gagatina Freyer, 1842; Echidnoides trilamina — Mauduyt, 1844; Vipera Pelias Soubeiran, 1855; Pelias berus var. Prester — Günther, 1858; Pelias berus var. Chersea — Günther, 1858; P[elias berus]. Var. dorsalis — Cope, 1860; P[elias berus]. Var. niger Cope, 1860; V[ipera]. (Pelias) berus — Jan, 1863; V[ipera]. (Pelias) berus var. prester — Jan, 1863; V[ipera]. (Pelias) berus var. lymnaea — Jan, 1863; Pelias Chersea — Erber, 1863; Pelias berus — Erber, 1863; Vipera berus var. prester — Jan & Sordelli, 1874; Vipera berus [berus] — Boettger, 1889; [Vipera berus] var. montana Méhelÿ, 1893; Vipera berus — Boulenger, 1896; Pelias berus lugubris Kashehenko, 1902; Vipera berus pelias — Chabanaud, 1923; [Vipera (Pelias) berus] forma brunneomarcata A.F. Reuss, 1923; [Vipera (Pelias) berus] forma luteoalba A.F. Reuss, 1923; [Vipera (Pelias) berus] forma ochracea asymmetrica A.F. Reuss, 1923; [Vipera (Pelias) berus] rudolphi-marchica A.F. Reuss, 1924; [Vipera (Pelias) berus] forma bilineata A.F. Reuss, 1924; Vipera (Pelias) berus forma chersea-splendens A.F. Reuss, 1925; Vipera (Pelias) berus forma ochracea-splendens A.F. Reuss, 1925; Vipera (Pelias) berus forma rutila A.F. Reuss, 1925; Vipera (Pelias) berus forma punctata A.F. Reuss, 1925; Coluber sachalinensis continentalis Nikolski, 1927; P[elias]. sudetica A.F. Reuss, 1927 (nomen nudum); V[ipera]. berus marchici A.F. Reuss, 1927; Vipera berus rudolphi A.F. Reuss, 1927 (nomen nudum); Vipera berus berus — Mertens & L. Müller, 1928; [Pelias] elberfeldi A.F. Reuss, 1929; Pelias rudolphi — A.F. Reuss, 1930; Pelias schöttleri A.F. Reuss, 1930; P[elias]. tyrolensis A.F. Reuss, 1930; Pelias schreiberi A.F. Reuss, 1930; Pelias flavescens A.F. Reuss, 1930 (nomen nudum); Pelias subalpina A.F. Reuss, 1930 (nomen nudum); Pelias neglecta A.F. Reuss, 1932; Vipera berus sphagnosa Krassawzef, 1932; Pelias occidentalis A.F. Reuss, 1933; Pelias occidentalis oldesloensis A.F. Reuss, 1933 (nomen nudum); Pelias occidentalis orbensis A.F. Reuss, 1933 (nomen nudum); Pelias sudetica forma steinii A.F. Reuss, 1935 (nomen nudum); Vipera marchici — A.F. Reuss, 1935; Pelias sudetica steinii forma emarcata A.F. Reuss, 1937 (nomen illegitimum); Vipera (Vipera) berus berus — Obst, 1983; Vipera berus forma brunneomarcata — Golay et al., 1993; Vipera berus forma ochracea-asymmetrica — Golay et al., 1993; Vipera berus forma luteoalba — Golay et al., 1993; Pelias schoettleri — Golay et al., 1993; Coluber coeruleus — Golay et al., 1993; Vipera berus — Golay et al., 1993

= Adder =

Species of venomous snake

Vipera berus, commonly known as the common European adder and the common European viper, is a species of venomous snake in the family Viperidae. The species is extremely widespread, and thus can be found throughout much of Europe, and as far as East Asia. There are three recognised subspecies.

Known by a host of common names including common adder and common viper, the adder has been the subject of much folklore in Britain and other European countries. It is not regarded as especially dangerous; the snake is not aggressive and usually bites only when really provoked, stepped on, or picked up. Bites can be very painful, but are rarely fatal. The specific name, berus, is Neo-Latin and was at one time used to refer to a snake, possibly the grass snake, Natrix natrix.

The common adder is found in different terrains, habitat complexity being essential for different aspects of its behaviour. It feeds on small mammals, birds, lizards, and amphibians, and in some cases on spiders, worms, and insects. The common adder, like most other vipers, is ovoviviparous, giving birth to live young. Females breed once every two or three years and litters are usually born in late summer to early autumn in the Northern Hemisphere. Litters range in size from three to 20 with young staying with their mothers for a few days. Adults grow to a total length (including tail) of 60 to 90 cm (24 to 35 in) and a mass of 50 to 180 g (1.8 to 6.3 oz). Three subspecies are recognised, including the nominate subspecies, Vipera berus berus, described here. The snake is not considered to be threatened, though it is protected in some countries.

== Taxonomy ==
There are three subspecies of V. berus that are recognised as being valid including the nominotypical subspecies.

Subspecies	Taxon author	Common name	Geographic range
V. b. berus	(Linnaeus, 1758)	Common European adder	Norway, Sweden, Bulgaria, Finland, Latvia, Estonia, Lithuania, France, Denmark, Germany, Austria, Switzerland, Northern Italy, Belgium, Netherlands, Great Britain, Poland, Croatia, Czech Republic, Slovakia, Slovenia, Hungary, Romania, Russia, Ukraine, Mongolia, Northwest China (north Xinjiang)
V. b. bosniensis	Boettger, 1889	Balkan cross adder	Balkan Peninsula
V. b. sachalinensis	Zarevskij, 1917	Sakhalin adder	Russian Far East (Amur Oblast, Primorsky Kray, Khabarovsk Kray, Sakhalin Island), North Korea, Northeast China (Jilin)

The subspecies V. b. bosniensis and V. b. sachalinensis have been regarded as full species in some recent publications.

The name 'adder' is derived from nædre, an Old English word that meant snake in the older forms of many Germanic languages. It was commonly used in the Old English version of the Christian Scriptures for the devil and the serpent in the Book of Genesis. In the 14th century, 'a nadder' in Middle English was rebracketed to 'an adder' (just as 'a napron' became 'an apron' and Shakespeare's 'a nuncle' changed into 'an uncle').

In keeping with its wide distribution and familiarity through the ages, Vipera berus has a large number of common names in English, which include:

Common European adder, common European viper, European viper, northern viper, adder, common adder, crossed viper, European adder, common viper, European common viper, cross adder, or common cross adder.

In Welsh, it is called gwiber, a name derived from Latin vīpera. In Denmark, Norway and Sweden, the snake is known as hugorm, hoggorm and huggorm, roughly translated as 'striking snake'. In Finland, it is known as kyykäärme or simply kyy, in Estonia it is known as rästik, while in Lithuania it is known as angis. In Poland the snake is called żmija zygzakowata, which translates as 'zigzag viper', due to the pattern on its back.

== Description ==
Relatively thick-bodied, adults usually grow to 60 cm (24 in) in total length (including tail), with an average of 55 cm (22 in). Maximum size varies by region. The largest, at over 90 cm (35 in), are found in Scandinavia; specimens of 104 cm (41 in) have been observed there on two occasions. In France and Great Britain, the maximum size is 80–87 cm (31–34 in). Mass ranges from 50 g (1.8 oz) to about 180 grams (6.3 oz).

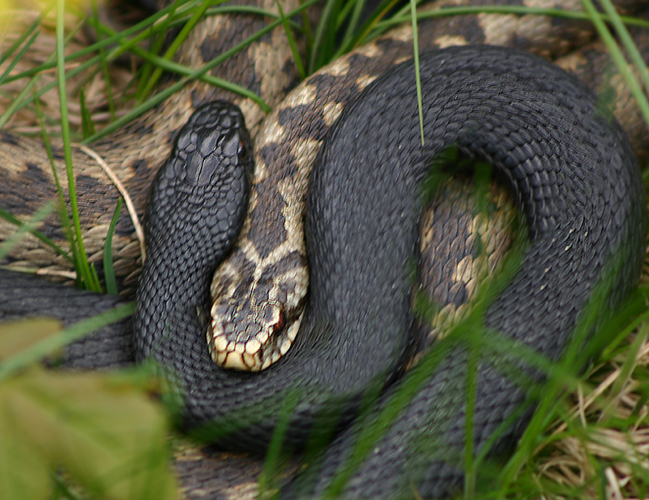
V. berus: normal and melanistic colour patterns

The head is fairly large and distinct and its sides are almost flat and vertical. The edge of the snout is usually raised into a low ridge. Seen from above, the rostral scale is not visible, or only just. Immediately behind the rostral, there are two (rarely one) small scales.

Dorsally, there are usually five large plates: a squarish frontal (longer than wide, sometimes rectangular), two parietals (sometimes with a tiny scale between the frontal and the parietals), and two long and narrow supraoculars. The latter are large and distinct, each separated from the frontal by one to four small scales. The nostril is situated in a shallow depression within a large nasal scale.

The eye is relatively large, equal in size to or slightly larger than the nasal scale, but often smaller in females. Below the supraoculars, there are six to 13 small circumorbital scales, usually eight to 10. The temporal scales are smooth (rarely weakly keeled). There are 10–12 sublabials and six to 10 (usually eight or 9) supralabials. Of these, numbers 3 and 4 are the largest, while numbers 4 and 5 (rarely 3 and 4) are separated from the eye by a single row of small scales (sometimes two rows in alpine specimens).

There are 21 rows of dorsal scales midbody (rarely 19, 20, 22, or 23). They are strongly keeled scales, except for those bordering the ventral scales. The scales appear to be loosely attached to the skin, with the lower rows becoming increasingly wider. Those closest to the ventral scales are twice as long as those along the midline. The number of ventral scales is 132–150 in males and 132–158 in females. The anal plate is single. The subcaudals are paired and number 32–46 in males and 23–38 in females.

This species exhibits significant variation in colouration. Light-coloured specimens are characterised by small, incomplete, dark crossbars on their backs, while darker specimens display faint or clear, darker brown markings. Melanistic individuals are completely black and lack any apparent dorsal pattern. However, most specimens have a zigzag pattern on their backs that extends along their entire bodies and tails. A distinctive dark V or X marking is usually present on the dorsal surface of the head. A dark streak runs from the eye to the neck and continues as a series of longitudinal spots along the flanks.

Unlike most snakes, the sexes of this species can often be distinguished by colour. Females are typically brown with dark brown markings, whereas males are a uniform grey with black markings. The base colour of males is often slightly lighter than that of females, which makes the black zigzag pattern stand out more. Melanistic individuals are often female.

The average lifespan of an adder is 10 years in the wild, and can reach up to 15 years or more in captivity with the proper care.

== Distribution and habitat ==
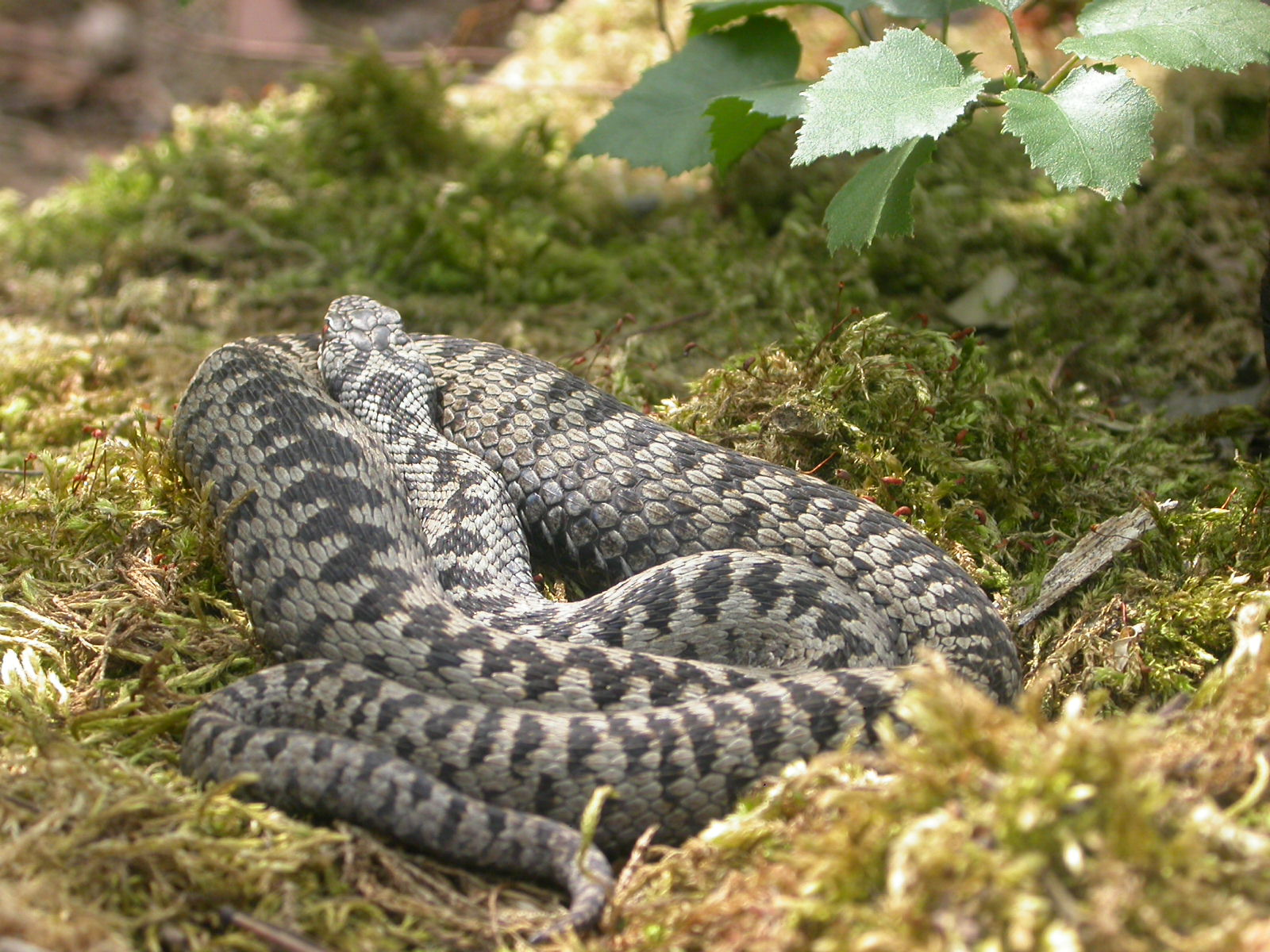
V. berus

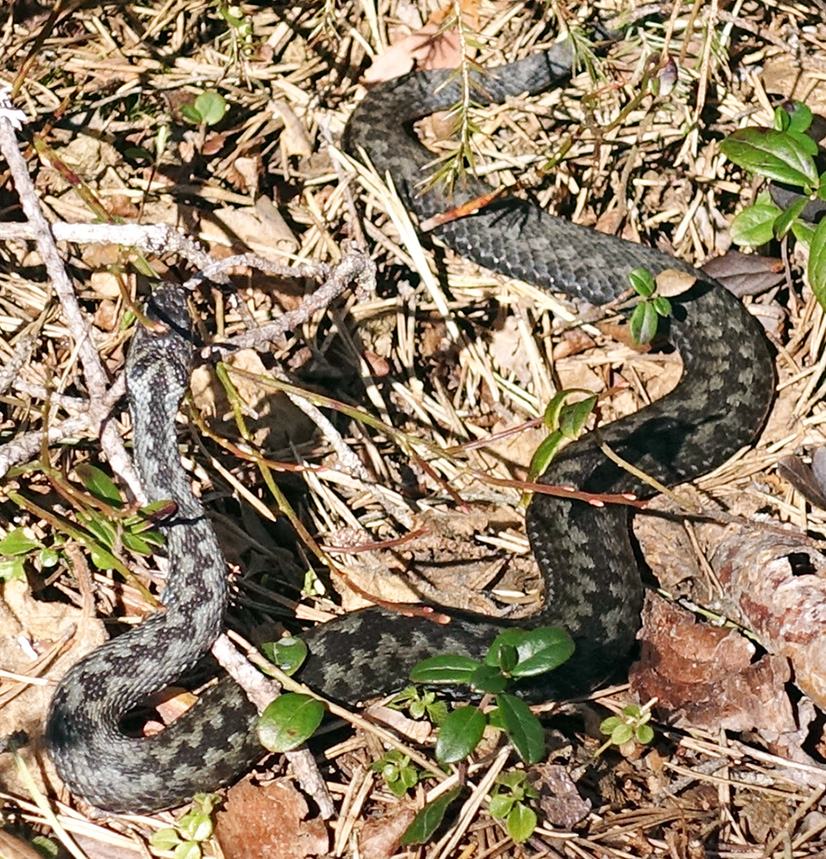
V. berus pictured in Laukaa, Finland

Vipera berus has a wide range. It can be found across the Eurasian land-mass; from northwestern Europe (Great Britain, Belgium, Netherlands, Scandinavia, Germany, France) across southern Europe (Italy, Serbia, Albania, Croatia, Montenegro, Bosnia and Herzegovina, North Macedonia, Bulgaria, and northern Greece) and eastern Europe to north of the Arctic Circle, and Russia to the Pacific Ocean, Sakhalin Island, North Korea, northern Mongolia and northern China. It is found farther north than any other snake species. The type locality was originally listed as 'Europa'. Mertens and Müller (1940) proposed restricting the type locality to Uppsala, Sweden and it was eventually restricted to Berthåga, Uppsala by designation of a neotype by Krecsák & Wahlgren (2008).

In several European countries, it is notable for being the only native venomous snake. It is also one of only three native British snake species. The other two, the barred grass snake and the smooth snake, are non-venomous.

Sufficient habitat complexity is crucial for this species to be present, in order to support its various behaviours—basking, foraging, and hibernation—as well as to offer some protection from predators and human disturbance. It is found in a variety of habitats, including: chalky downs, rocky hillsides, moors, sandy heaths, meadows, rough commons, woodland edges, sunny glades and clearings, scrubby slopes and hedgerows, rubbish tips, coastal dunes, and stone quarries. If dry ground is available nearby, it will venture into wetlands and may therefore be found on the banks of streams, lakes, and ponds.

In much of southern Europe, such as southern France and northern Italy, it is found in either low-lying wetlands or at high altitudes. In the Swiss Alps, it may ascend to about 3,000 m (9,800 ft). In Hungary and Russia, it avoids open steppeland; a habitat in which V. ursinii is more likely to occur. In Russia, however, it does occur in the forest steppe zone.

=== Conservation status ===
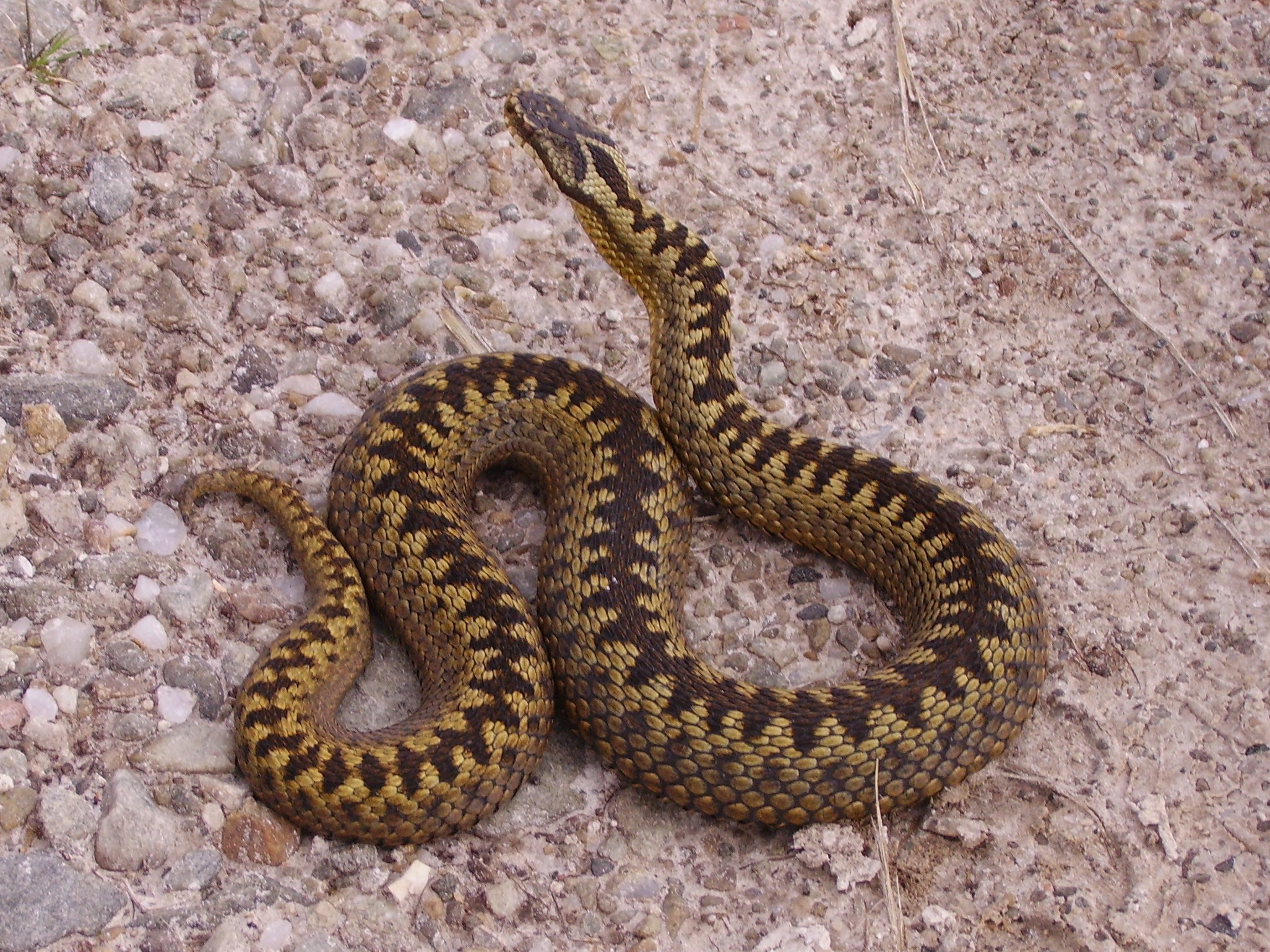
V. berus female

In Great Britain, the killing, injuring, harming or selling of adders is illegal under the provisions of the Wildlife and Countryside Act 1981. A similar situation exists in Norway under the Viltloven (The Wildlife Act 1981) and in Denmark (1981). In both Finland and Sweden, the adder is a protected species. However, under the Finnish Nature Conservation Act (9/2023) and corresponding Swedish legislation, killing the snake is permitted as a last resort if it poses a danger on private property and cannot be safely captured and relocated. The common viper is categorised as 'endangered' in Switzerland, and is also protected in some other countries in its range. It is also found in many protected areas.

This species is listed as protected (Appendix III) under the Berne Convention.

The IUCN Red List of Threatened Species describes the conservation status as of 'least concern' in view of its wide distribution, presumed large population, broad range of habitats, and likely slow rate of decline though it acknowledges the population to be decreasing. Reduction in habitat for a variety of reasons, fragmentation of populations in Europe due to intense agriculture practices, and collection for the pet trade or for venom extraction have been recorded as major contributing factors for its decline. A citizen science based survey in the UK found evidence of extensive population declines in the UK, especially affecting smaller populations. A combination of public pressure and disturbance, habitat fragmentation and poor habitat management were considered the most likely causes of the decline. The release of 47 million non-native pheasants and 10 million partridges each year by countryside estates has also been suggested to have a significant impact on adder populations across the UK, with the possibility the reptile could be extinct by 2032.

== Behaviour ==
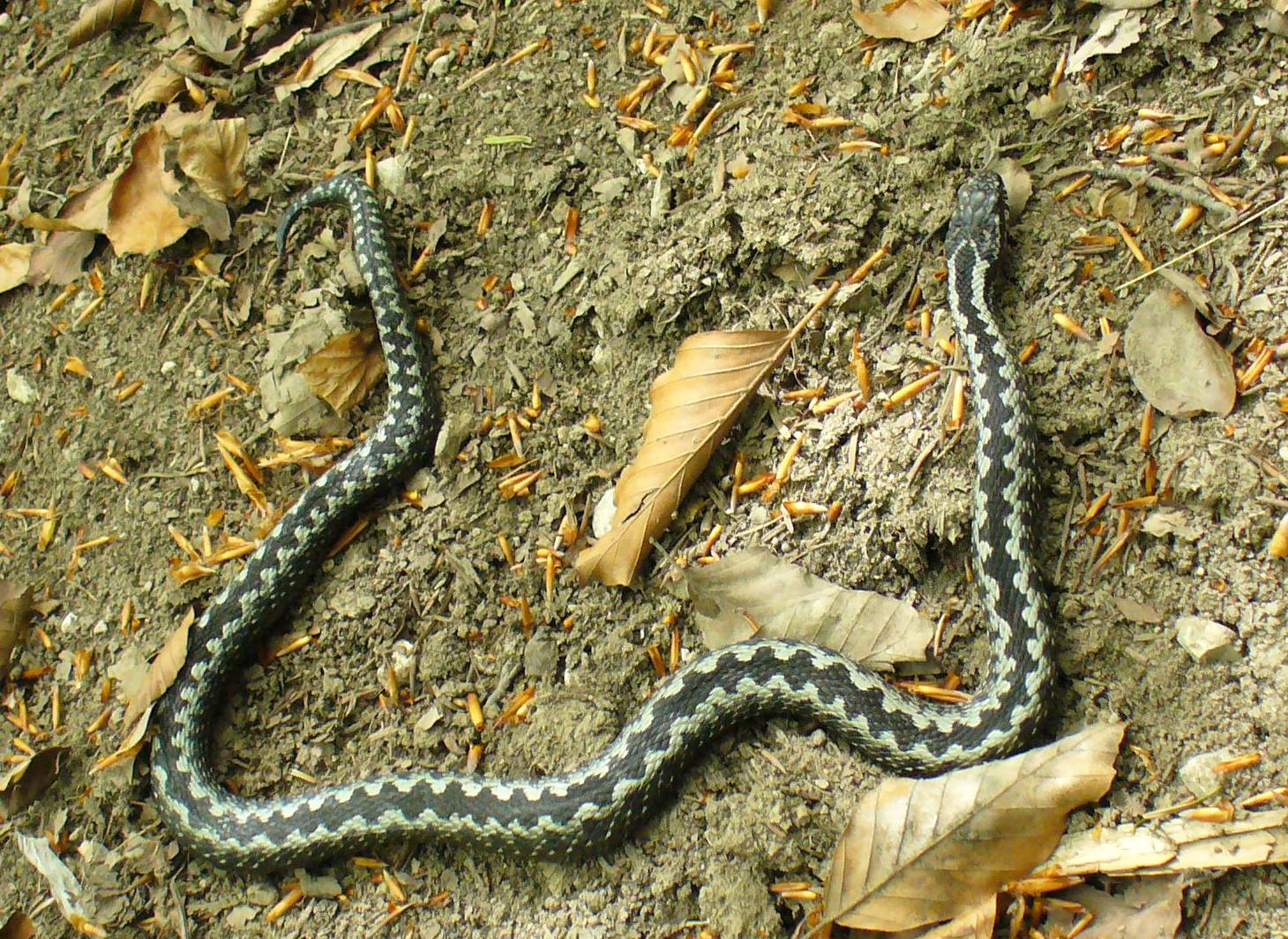
V. berus male

This species is mainly diurnal, especially in the north of its range. Further south, it is said to be active in the evening, and it may even be active at night during the summer months. It is predominantly a terrestrial species, though it is known to climb up banks and into low bushes in order to bask or search for prey.

Adders are not usually aggressive and tend to be rather timid, biting only when they are cornered, alarmed, stepped on, or picked up. They will usually disappear in the undergrowth at the slightest hint of danger, but will return once all is quiet, often to the same spot. Occasionally, individual snakes will reveal their presence with a loud, sustained hiss, presumably to warn off potential aggressors. These are often pregnant females. When threatened, the front part the adder's body is drawn into an S-shape in preparation for a strike.

This cold-adapted species hibernates in winter. In Great Britain, males hibernate for around 150 days and females for around 180 days. In northern Sweden, hibernation lasts 8–9 months. On mild winter days, they may emerge to bask in areas where the snow has melted, often travelling across snow in the process. Approximately 15% of adults and 30–40% of juveniles die during hibernation.

== Feeding ==
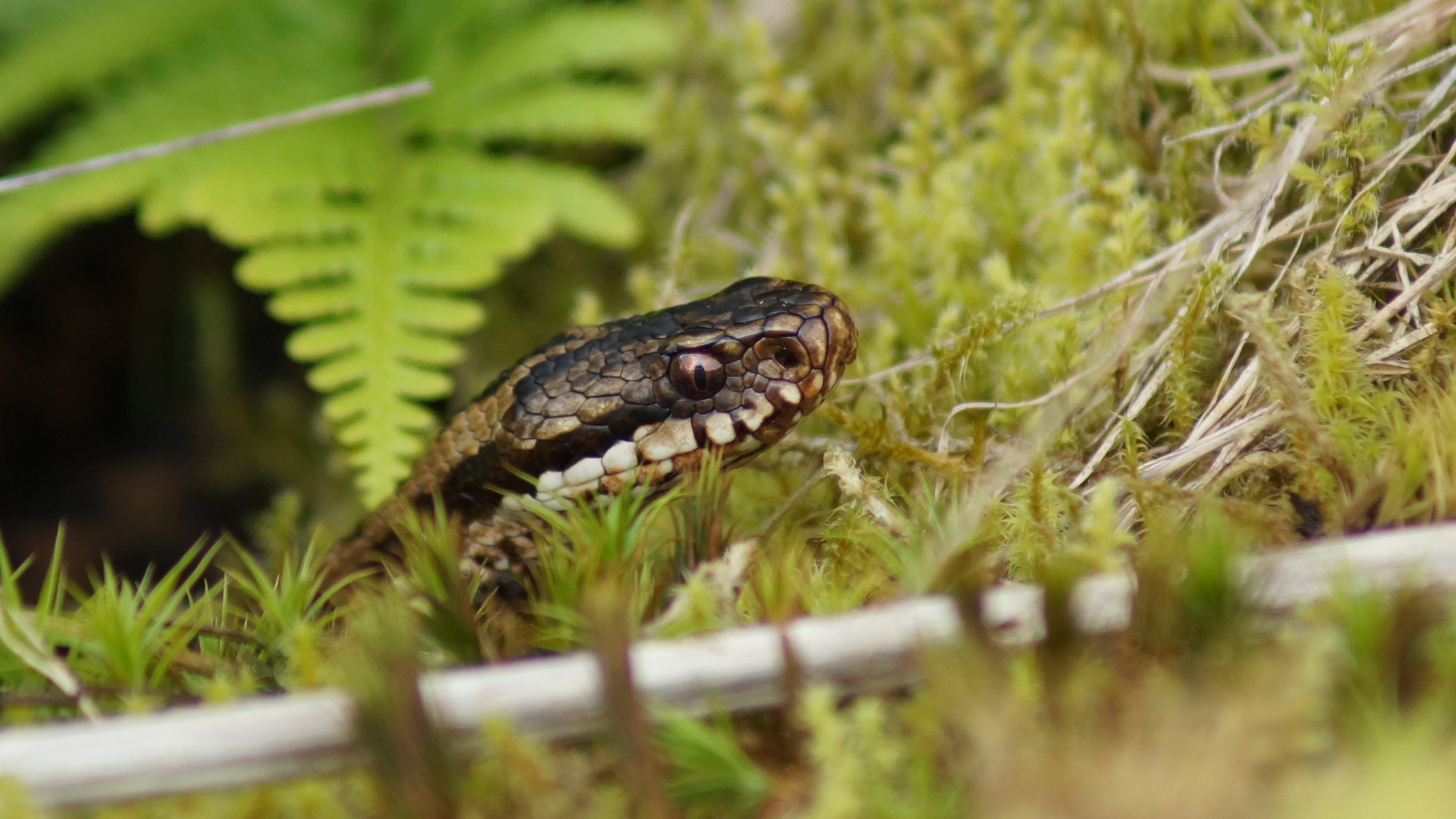
V. berus female; head detail

Their diet mainly consists of small mammals, such as mice, rats, voles, and shrews, as well as lizards. They sometimes take slow worms, and even weasels (such as least weasels and possibly juvenile stoats) and moles. Adders also feed on amphibians, such as frogs, newts, and salamanders. Birds are also reported to be consumed, especially nestlings and even eggs, for which they will climb into shrubbery and bushes. Generally, diet varies depending on locality.

Juveniles will eat nestling mammals, small lizards and frogs as well as worms and spiders. One important dietary source for young adders is the alpine salamander (Salamadra atra). Because both species live at higher altitudes, S. atra could be a prevalent food source for adders, since there may be few other animals. One study suggests that alpine salamanders could consist of almost half of the adders' diets in some locations. They have been witnessed swallowing these salamanders in the early morning hours. Once they reach about 30 cm (0.98 ft) in length, their diet begins to resemble that of the adults.

== Reproduction ==
In Hungary, mating takes place during the last week of April, whereas in the north it occurs later, during the second week of May. Mating has also been observed in June and even in early October, but it is unclear whether any offspring result from autumn mating. Females often breed once every two years, or even once every three years if the seasons are short and the climate is not conducive.

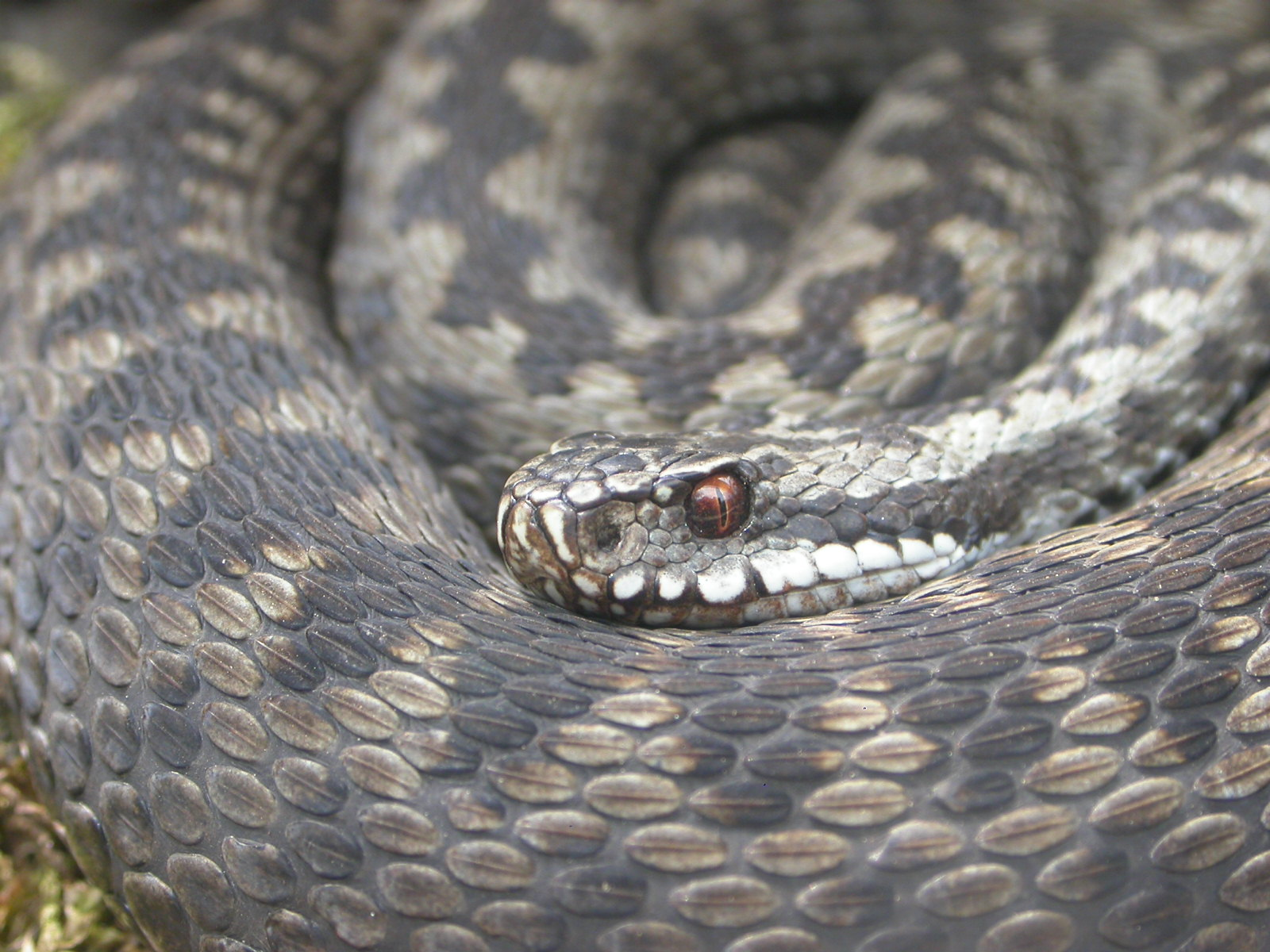
V. berus – showing strongly keeled scales on dorsal area

Males find females by following their scent trails, which can extend for hundreds of metres a day. If a female flees after being found, the male will pursue her. Courtship involves a synchronised display of a side-by-side 'flowing' movement, with the tongue flicking along the back and the tail being whipped excitedly. Pairs remain together for a day or two after mating. Males expel their rivals and engage in combat. This often begins with the aforementioned flowing behaviour before culminating in the dramatic 'adder dance'. In this act, males face each other, raising the front of their bodies vertically and making swaying movements and attempt to push each other to the ground. This sequence of actions is repeated until one of the two males becomes exhausted and withdraws to find another mate. Appleby (1971) notes that he has never seen an intruder win one of these contests, suggesting that the defender becomes so frustrated during the courtship that he refuses to accept defeat in pursuit of mating opportunities. There is no record of any biting taking place during these bouts.

Females usually give birth in August or September, but sometimes as early as July, or as late as early October. Litters can range in size from three to 20. The young are usually born encased in a transparent sac, and must free themselves from it. Occasionally, they manage to break free from this membrane while still inside the mother.

Neonates measure 14 to 23 cm (5.5 to 9.1 in) in total length (including tail), with an average total length of 17 cm (6.7 in). They are born with a fully functional venom apparatus and a reserve supply of yolk within their bodies. They shed their skin for the first time within a day or two. Females do not appear to take much interest in their offspring, but the young have been observed to remain near their mothers for several days after birth.

== Venom ==
Adder venom is primarily proteolytic, haemotoxic, and cytotoxic, although some populations may also have neurotoxic and neuromuscular effects. The venom is considered simpler than the related Vipera ammodytes, which could explain its comparatively mild effects and greater LD_{50}. There is probably regional and individual variation in the venom composition of adders.

Due to the rapid rate of human expansion throughout the range of this species, bites are relatively common. Domestic animals and livestock are frequent victims. In Great Britain, most cases occur between March and October. In Sweden, there are around 1,300 bites per year, with an estimated 12% of cases requiring hospitalisation. At least eight different antivenoms are available against bites from this species.

Mallow et al. (2003) describe the toxicity of the venom as being relatively low compared to that of other viper species. They cite Minton (1974) who reported the LD_{50} values for mice to be 0.55 mg/kg IV, 0.80 mg/kg IP and 6.45 mg/kg SC. For comparison, one test found that the minimum lethal dose of venom for a guinea pig was 40–67 mg, whereas only 1.7 mg was necessary when Daboia russelii venom was used. Brown (1973) gives a higher subcutaneous LD_{50} range of 1.0–4.0 mg/kg. All agree that the venom yield is low. Minton (1974) mentions 10–18 mg for specimens 48–62 cm (19–24.5 in) in length, while Brown (1973) lists only 6 mg.

Relatively speaking, bites from this species are not highly dangerous. In Britain, there were only 14 known fatalities between 1876 and 2005—the last of which was a five-year-old child in 1975—and one near-fatal bite on a 39-year-old woman in Essex in 1998. An 82-year-old woman died following a bite in Germany in 2004, although it is unclear whether her death was due to the effects of the venom, and a 52-year-old male died in Sweden after failing to seek treatment in 2023. A 44-year-old British man was left seriously ill after he was bitten by an adder in the Dalby Forest, Yorkshire, in 2014. Even so, professional medical help should always be sought as soon as possible after any bite. Very occasionally bites can be life-threatening, particularly in small children, while adults may experience discomfort and disability long after the bite. The length of recovery varies, but may take up to a year.

Local symptoms include severe and immediate pain, followed by swelling and tingling after a few minutes, although this may take up to 30 minutes. Blisters containing blood are uncommon. The pain may then spread within a few hours, accompanied by tenderness and inflammation. Red lymphangitic lines and bruising may appear, and the entire limb can become swollen and bruised within 24 hours. The swelling may also spread to the trunk and, in children, the whole body. Necrosis and intracompartmental syndromes are very rare.

Systemic symptoms arising from anaphylaxis can be severe. These may manifest within five minutes of the bite, or can be delayed for several hours. These symptoms may include nausea, retching and vomiting, abdominal colic and diarrhoea, incontinence of urine and faeces, sweating, fever, vasoconstriction, tachycardia, lightheadedness, loss of consciousness, and even blindness, shock, angioedema of the face, lips, gums, tongue, throat and epiglottis, urticaria and bronchospasm. If left untreated, these symptoms may persist or fluctuate for up to 48 hours. In severe cases, cardiovascular failure may occur.

== In culture and beliefs ==
It was once thought that adders were deaf, as referenced in Psalm 58 (v. 4), yet snake oil derived from adders was used as a cure for deafness and earaches. Females were also thought to swallow their young when threatened and regurgitate them unharmed later. It was further believed that they did not perish until sunset. Remedies for adder "stings" included killing the snake responsible and rubbing the corpse or its fat on the wound, also holding a pigeon or chicken on the bite, or jumping over water. Adders were thought to be attracted to hazel trees and repelled by ash trees.

The Druids believed that large, frenzied gatherings of adders took place in spring, at the centre of which was a polished rock called an adder stone or Glain Neidr in the Welsh language. These stones were said to have held supernatural powers.
