= Tandonia serbica =

Conservation status
- Least Concern (IUCN 3.1)

Scientific classification
- Kingdom: Animalia
- Phylum: Mollusca
- Class: Gastropoda
- Order: Stylommatophora
- Family: Milacidae
- Genus: Tandonia
- Species: T. serbica

Binomial name
- Tandonia serbica (Wagner, 1931)

Synonyms
- Milax (Milax) serbicus Wagner, 1931

Species of gastropod

Tandonia serbica is a species of keeled slug in the family Milacidae. It is endemic to the eastern Balkans.

== Distribution ==
This slug lives in Bulgaria, eastern Serbia, and eastern North Macedonia. It has probably been introduced to Croatia (Dubrovnik and other localities).

== Description ==
This slug is brownish or dirty cream in color with a blackish reticulate pattern on the mantle. Additional black spots are present on back and sides, diameter 1–2 mm, resembling ink-stains. The keel is pale; the mantle is darker than the rest; there are 13 indistinct grooves between the keel and the pneumostome. The head is blackish. the sole of the foot is a dirty cream in color. The mucus is colorless and transparent.

The size of preserved specimens is up to 45 mm in length and 11 mm in width.

Reproductive system: Penis rounded, far wider than epiphallus, epiphallus elongate with peaky end, vas deferens opening symmetrically, spermatheca spherical when empty, with a long tubular duct, vagina very short, accessory glands like adhering lobular formations surrounding vagina, atrium wide and like prolongation of penis.

Tandonia serbica resembles Tandonia kusceri, with which it occurs often sympatrically, Tandonia serbica is smaller and Tandonia kusceri has no ink-stains. Vas deferens of Tandonia serbica is shorter, delimited from epiphallus, epiphallus shorter, penis larger. Wiktor (1996) pointed out that no spermatophores have ever been observed in Tandonia kusceri, and brought up the hypothesis that Tandonia kusceri and Tandonia serbica could be dimorphic forms of the same species in different stages of sexual activity.

== Ecology ==
This species lives almost exclusively on dry slopes, most often in rock rubble sheltered by bushes, usually on limestone, in Bulgaria up to elevations of 1800 m. Synantrope.

Life cycle: very little is known about the biology of this species. Spermathecas are present, at least in June and October.
