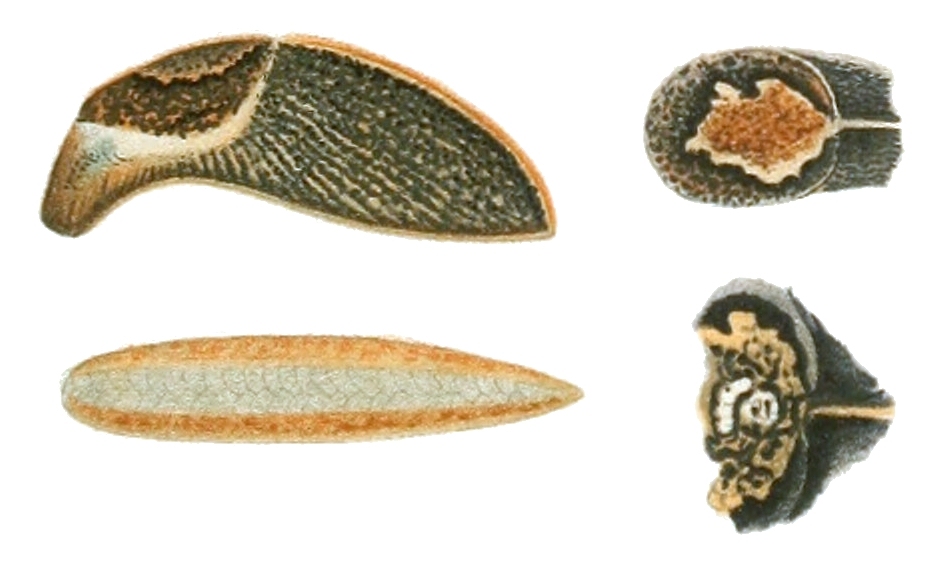
- A 1912 drawing of a preserved specimen of Milax caucasicus from the original description by Heinrich Simroth.

Scientific classification
- Kingdom: Animalia
- Phylum: Mollusca
- Class: Gastropoda
- Order: Stylommatophora
- Family: Milacidae
- Genus: Milax
- Species: M. caucasicus

Binomial name
- Milax caucasicus (Simroth, 1912)

Synonyms
- Amalia caucasica Simroth, 1912

= Milax caucasicus =

Species of gastropod

Milax caucasicus is a species of air-breathing land slug, a terrestrial pulmonate gastropod mollusk in the family Milacidae.

== Distribution ==
The species occurs in Caucasus: Georgia.

Type locality is Borjomi in Georgia.

== Ecology ==
There is no information about its habitat and ecology.
