= Tandonia lagostana =

Conservation status
- Critically Endangered (IUCN 3.1)

Scientific classification
- Kingdom: Animalia
- Phylum: Mollusca
- Class: Gastropoda
- Order: Stylommatophora
- Family: Milacidae
- Genus: Tandonia
- Species: T. lagostana

Binomial name
- Tandonia lagostana (H. Wagner, 1940)

Synonyms
- Milax lagostana H. Wagner, 1940

Species of gastropod

Tandonia lagostana is a species of keeled slug in the family Milacidae. It is endemic to the island of Lastovo in Croatia where it as last collected in 1940. There is an additional record from the Montenegro coast that requires confirmation.
