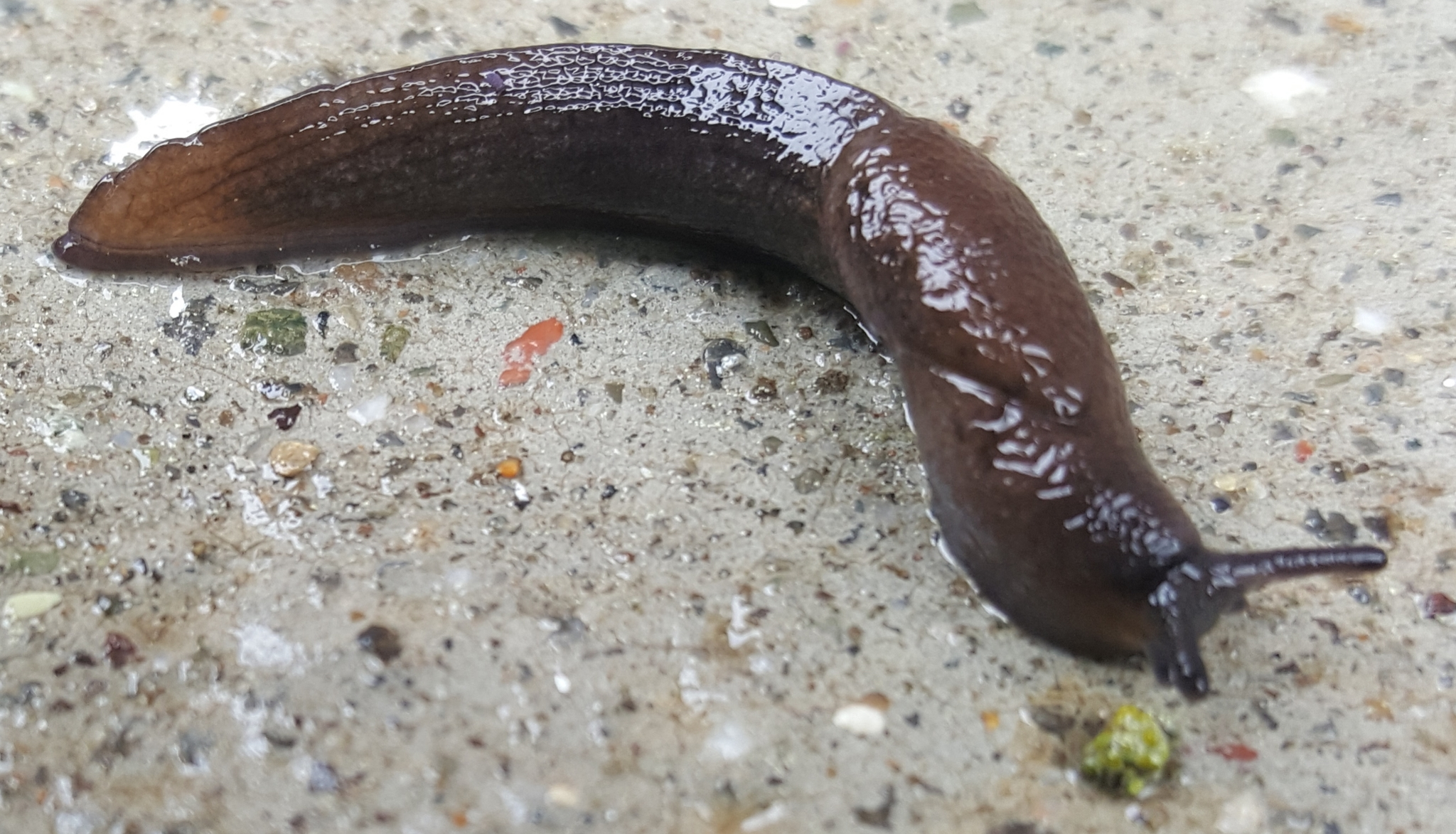

Conservation status
- Secure (NatureServe)

Scientific classification
- Kingdom: Animalia
- Phylum: Mollusca
- Class: Gastropoda
- Order: Stylommatophora
- Family: Milacidae
- Genus: Milax
- Species: M. gagates

Binomial name
- Milax gagates (Draparnaud, 1801)

Synonyms
- Limax gagates Draparnaud, 1801

= Milax gagates =

Greenhouse slug

Species of gastropod

Milax gagates, known by the common name greenhouse slug, is a species of air-breathing, keeled, land slug, a shell-less terrestrial gastropod mollusc in the family Milacidae.

== Description ==
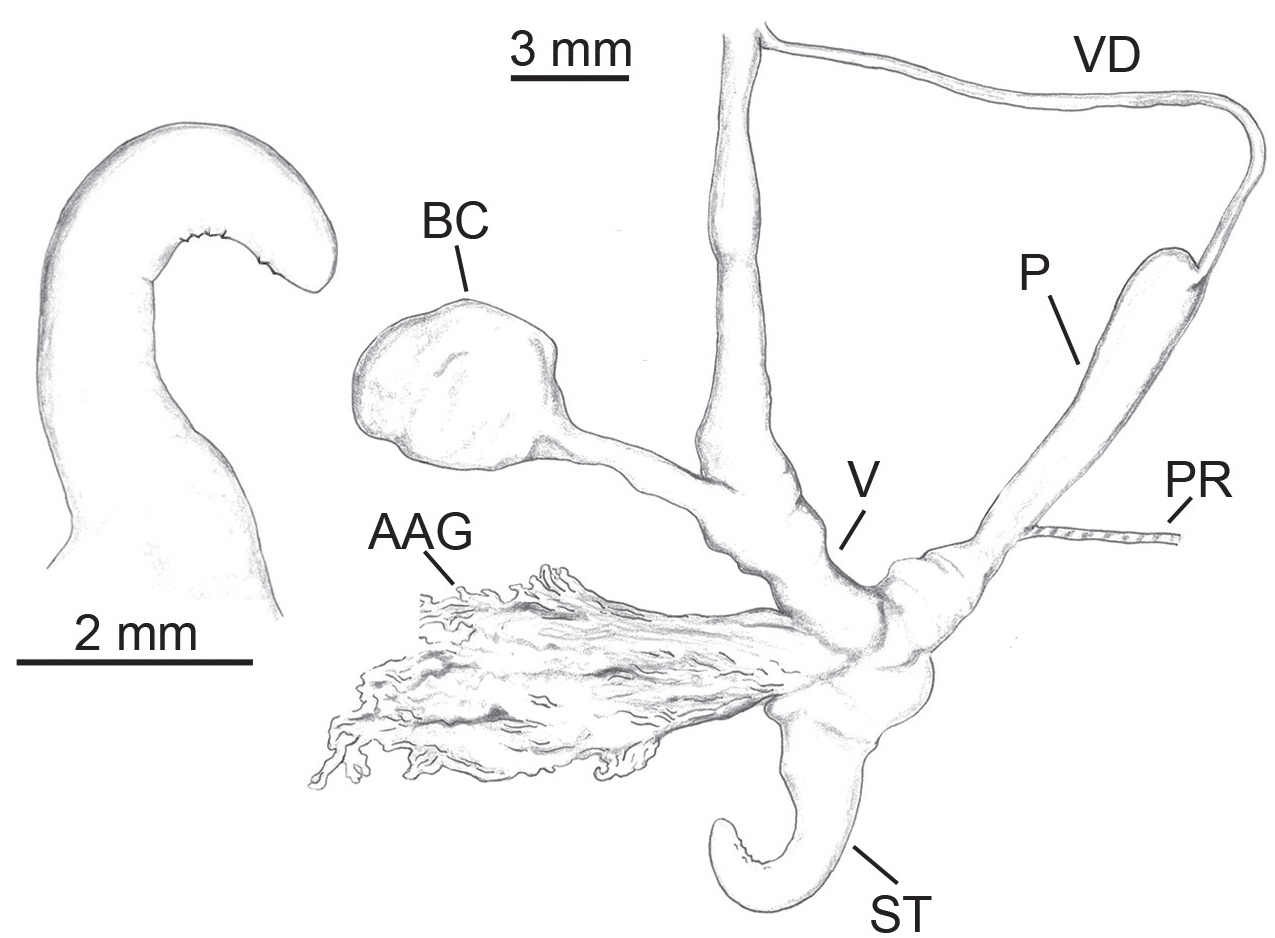
Genitalia, with the diagnostic stimulator (ST) shown magnified on the left. AAG = atrial accessory gland; BC = bursa copulatrix; P = penis; PR = penial retractor muscle; V = vagina; VD = vas deferens.

The body of Milax gagates is an even dark grey to black, although it has somewhat lighter sides. There are no pigment spots. The mantle is relatively large (35-40% of body length), with distinct grooves. The keel is prominent between mantle and posterior end. Skin sculpture is weak. There are 16-17 grooves between keel and pneumostome. The sole of the foot has blackish lateral zones and a lighter medial zone.

Milax gagates is up to 50 mm long. Preserved specimen have a length of 25–30 mm and a width of 6–8 mm. The weight of adult slugs ranges from 990 mg to 3300 mg.

Reproductive system: The penis is rounded, and half as long as the epiphallus. The epiphallus is slightly widened and truncated (as if cut off) at its end. the vas deferens is short (usually not longer than epiphallus), opens asymmetrically at the truncated end of the epiphallus. The atrium is short, and not widened. The accessory gland consist of several elongate glands and is connected to the atrium by some 20 short coiled tubular ducts. The stimulator is narrow, conical, slightly flattened at its end with some papillae.

The stimulator of the similar species Milax nigricans has more papillae situated at its base and not near its free end.

== Distribution ==
The native range of Milax gagates was originally from Morocco through Tunisia and southern Spain to southern France and the Balearic Islands.

It is an endangered species in Rhineland-Palatinate, Germany.

The species may be native to the Canary Islands.

Milax gagates has been introduced in the area between Portugal and Galicia, the Atlantic coastlands of France to Belgium, the British Isles, and in many other areas almost worldwide (Australia, Tasmania, New Zealand, Japan, Pacific islands, South Africa, Atlantic islands). As an introduced species it now occurs in a number of countries and islands including:

- Portugal
- Belgium
- British Isles: Great Britain and Ireland. In Britain is always local except in Cornwall.
- Australia and Tasmania
- New Zealand
- Japan
- Pacific islands
- South Africa
- Atlantic Islands
- United States - widely distributed. In Florida only in ports.
- Argentina

== Ecology ==
Milax gagates lives mostly in cultivated areas, often the coast, and also in forests, shrublands, and natural meadows. It prefers habitats close to water. It hides under stones, moist ground litter and in soil cavities.

It feeds on fresh herbs, including the roots. It can sometimes be a pest of crops such as carrots and potatoes. It is occasionally damaging to gardens and crops in Britain. It is an agricultural pest on soybean, sunflower, and oilseed rape in Argentina.

In Britain copulation takes place during the period from spring to autumn. During copulation both slugs cling together so closely that no everted genitalia are visible. Under laboratory conditions, the first eggs are laid 5–15 days after copulation. At one time approximately 15 eggs are laid. This can be repeated several times, but in total not more than 100 eggs are laid by one individual. The dimensions of the eggs are 2 × 1.5 mm. Self-fertilization is also possible.

The slug is semelparous, dying 15 to 30 days after laying eggs. Juveniles hatch after at least 25 to 30 days. Maturity is reached in 4 to 5 months under laboratory conditions.
