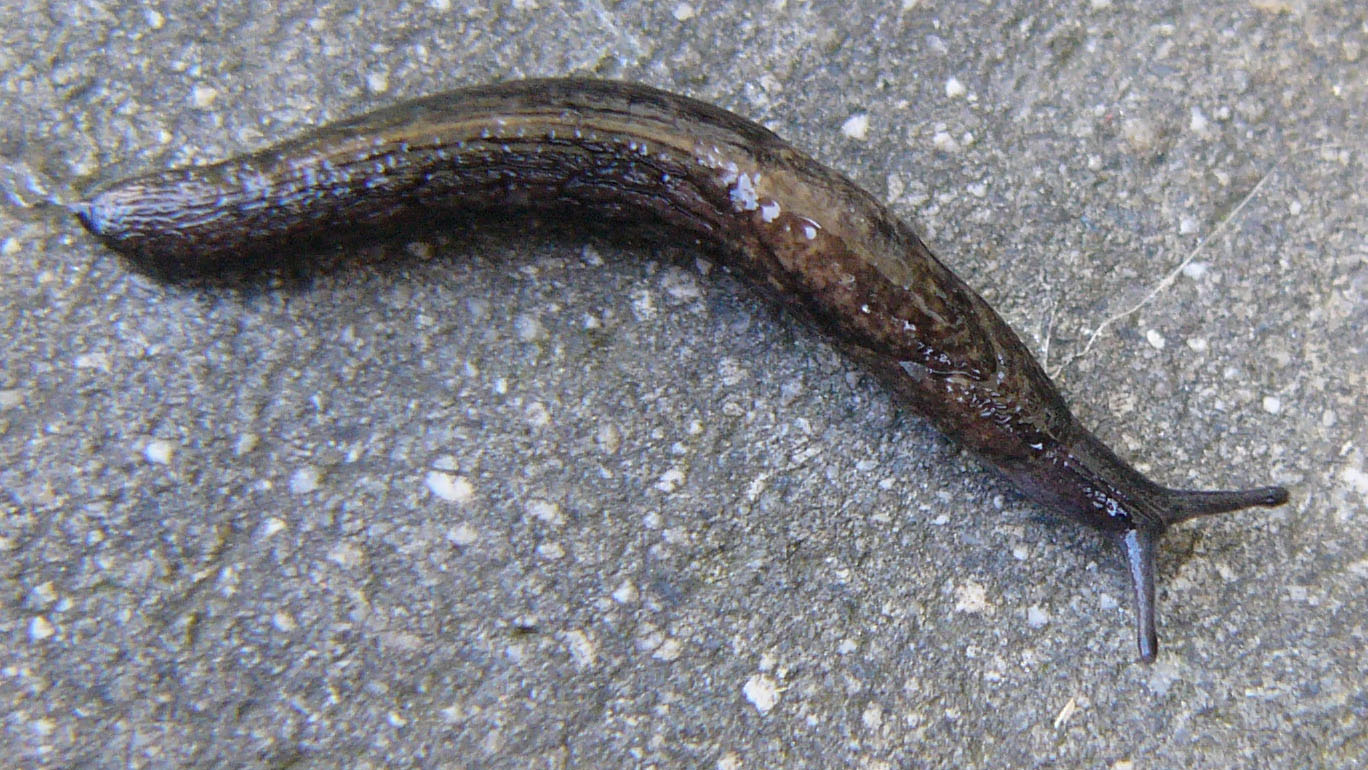
- A live individual of Tandonia budapestensis

Conservation status
- Least Concern (IUCN 3.1)

Scientific classification
- Kingdom: Animalia
- Phylum: Mollusca
- Class: Gastropoda
- Order: Stylommatophora
- Family: Milacidae
- Genus: Tandonia
- Species: T. budapestensis

Binomial name
- Tandonia budapestensis (Hazay, 1880)

Synonyms
- Amalia budapestensis Hazay, 1880; Milax gracilis valachicus Grossu & Lupu, 1961

= Tandonia budapestensis =

Species of gastropod

Tandonia budapestensis is a species of air-breathing, keeled, land slug, a shell-less terrestrial gastropod mollusks in the family Milacidae.

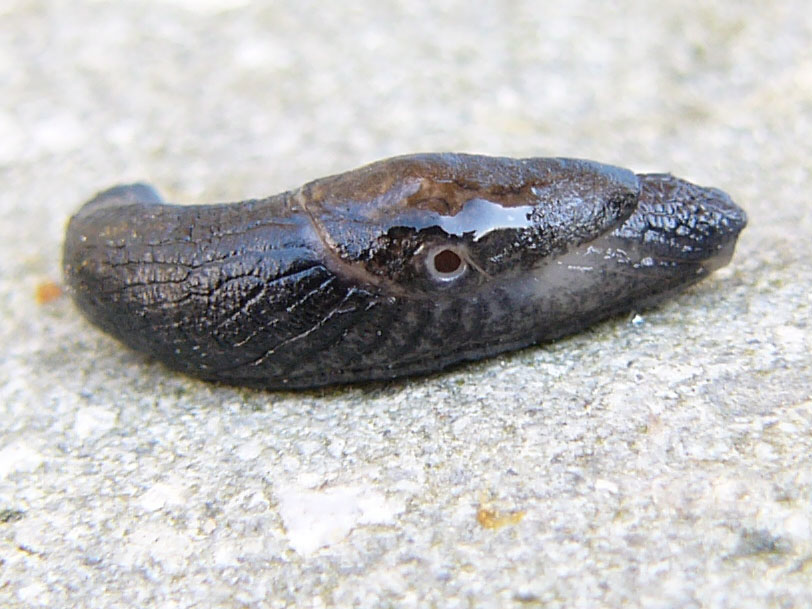
A partially contracted Tandonia budapestensis, showing an open pneumostome

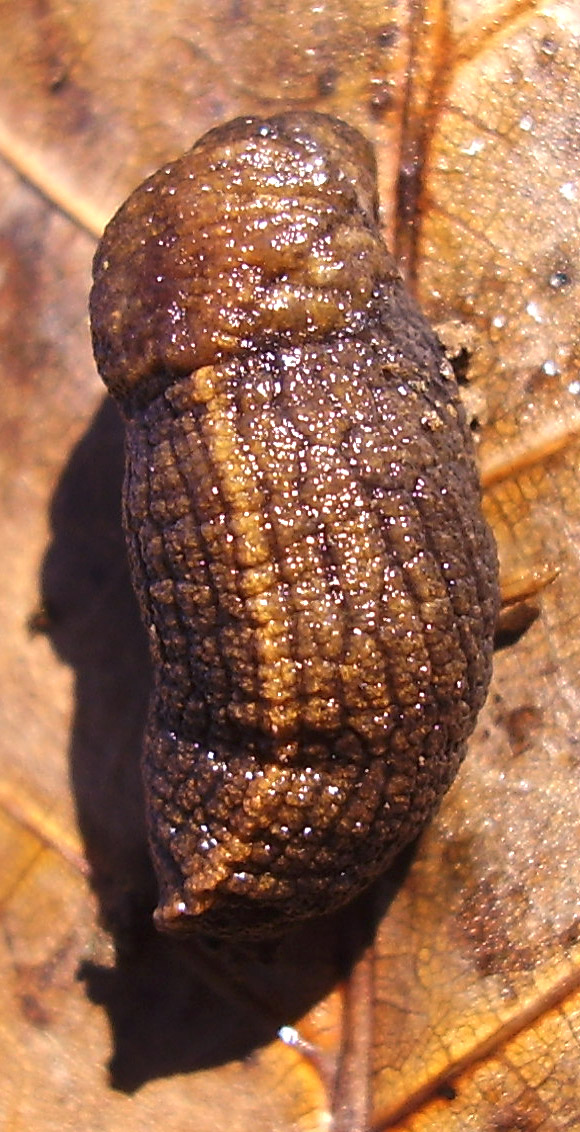
Dorsal view of Tandonia budapestensis showing its light keel

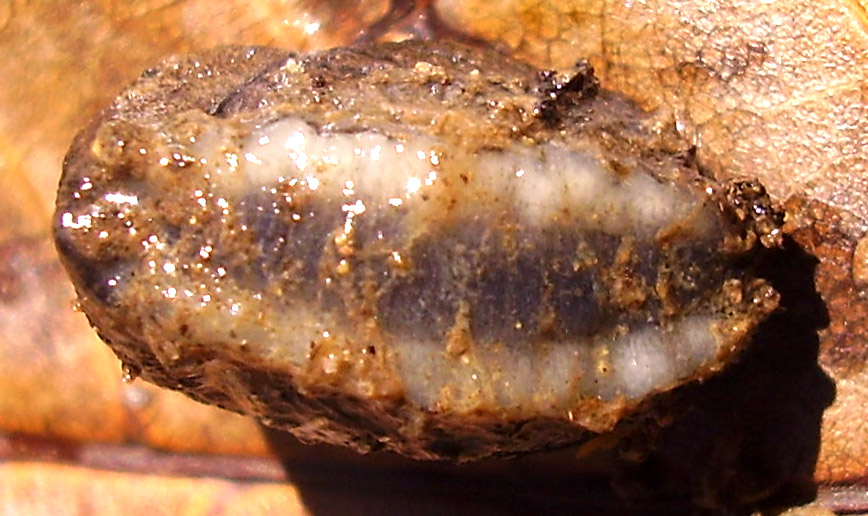
The sole of Tandonia budapestensis

== Description ==
This slug is basically dark brownish grey, with a keel of a brighter color. The body is yellowish-grey to brown or dark grey, with numerous black spots, so that the slug may appear to be evenly black-brown, slightly lighter at the sides. The animal is very slender, gradually narrowing posteriorly. The mantle length is less than 1/3 of the body length. There are blurry black bands on the sides of the mantle. The keel is prominent, light, and reaches the mantle. The head and neck are blackish. The sole is narrow and cream with brown or orange hue. The body mucus is usually colourless, thick and sticky but it is yellowish when the slug is irritated.

The length is up to 70 mm. The length of a preserved specimen is 30–40 mm.

Reproductive system: The penis is rounded, wider than and approximately as long as the epiphallus. The vas deferens opening is clearly asymmetrically at the posterior end of epiphallus. There is a small simple papilla inside the penis. The spermatheca duct is usually thick; the vagina and atrium are short, the vagina accessory glands are two lobe-like objects connected to the vagina by thin ducts. The spermatophore is thin, 16 mm long, covered almost entirely with short spines.

== Distribution ==
This slug is native to Europe. It originated most probably from southeastern Alps and north Balkans to Hungary and Romania (Transylvania).

It occurs in the following countries, amongst others:

Europe:

- Austria
- Bulgaria
- British Isles: introduced before 1880: Great Britain and Ireland
- Czech Republic - least concern (LC)
- France
- Hebrides
- Hungary
- Iceland
- Kaliningrad
- Netherlands
- Poland
- Romania
- Slovakia
- Turkey
- Ukraine

other countries:

- New Zealand
- USA

This species is already established in the USA, and is considered to represent a potentially serious threat as a pest, an invasive species which could negatively affect agriculture, natural ecosystems, human health or commerce. Therefore, it has been suggested that this species be given top national quarantine significance in the USA.

== Habitat ==
This slug mainly lives in secondary, anthropogenous (man-made) habitats, such as farmland. The habitat of Tandonia budapestensis includes parks, gardens, ruins and cultivated fields. It lives as a synanthrope. It occur in natural environments in Britain only where human disturbance is involved. In south Bulgaria it is found usually between 300 and 1000 m, but locally up to 2200 m. It requires humidity and is active at night. It buries into heavy soils.

This species is widespread in some countries and it is still spreading in the British Isles.

The biology of the species was reviewed by Reise et al. (2006). In Britain the copulation of this slug species takes place from November to January; in Central Europe from April to autumn. Slugs may copulate several times in their life. Copulation begins usually at night and may last 15 hours or more; everted genitalia are visible between the partners. In Britain, juveniles hatch in April or May, and maturity is reached in the autumn. Up to more than 20 eggs are laid at a time. In Central Europe, eggs, sub-adults and adults pass the winter.

== Human relevance ==
This species is noxious to crops, in lowland England particularly to potatoes. This species is a pest in crops of root vegetables.
