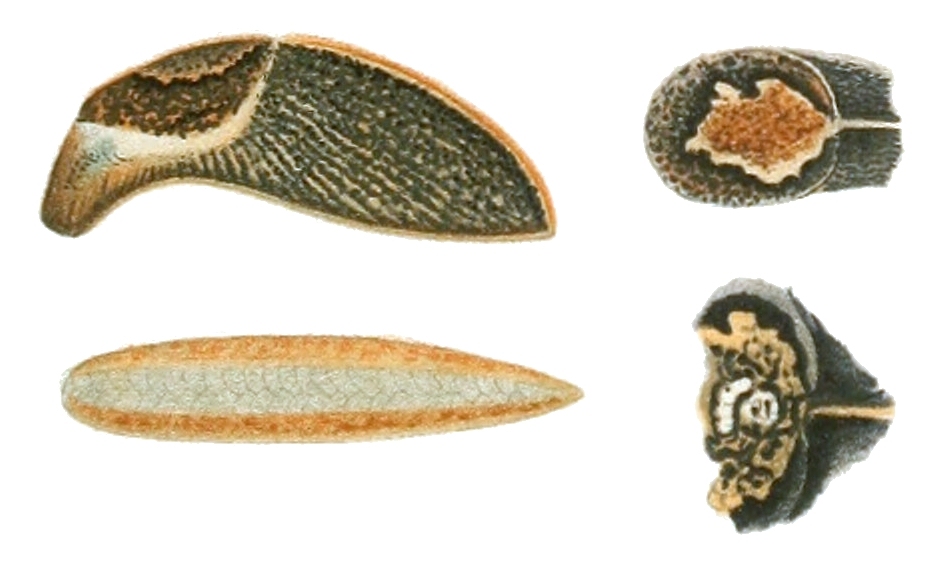
- 1912 drawings of a preserved specimen of Milax caucasicus from the original description by Heinrich Simroth

Scientific classification
- Domain: Eukaryota
- Kingdom: Animalia
- Phylum: Mollusca
- Class: Gastropoda
- Order: Stylommatophora
- Family: Milacidae
- Genus: Milax; Gray, 1855

= Milax (gastropod) =

Genus of gastropods

Milax is a genus of air-breathing, keeled, land slugs. These are shell-less terrestrial gastropod mollusks in the family Milacidae.

This is the type genus of the family.

== Species ==
Species within the genus Milax include:

- Milax aegaeicus
- Milax altenai
- Milax caucasicus
- Milax cyprius
- Milax gagates - the greenhouse slug. This is the type species of the genus Milax
- Milax nigricans
- Milax ochraceus
- Milax parvulus
- Milax verrucosus
