= Riccardoella =

Scientific classification
- Kingdom: Animalia
- Phylum: Arthropoda
- Subphylum: Chelicerata
- Class: Arachnida
- Order: Trombidiformes
- Family: Ereynetidae
- Genus: Riccardoella; Berlese, 1923

Genus of mites

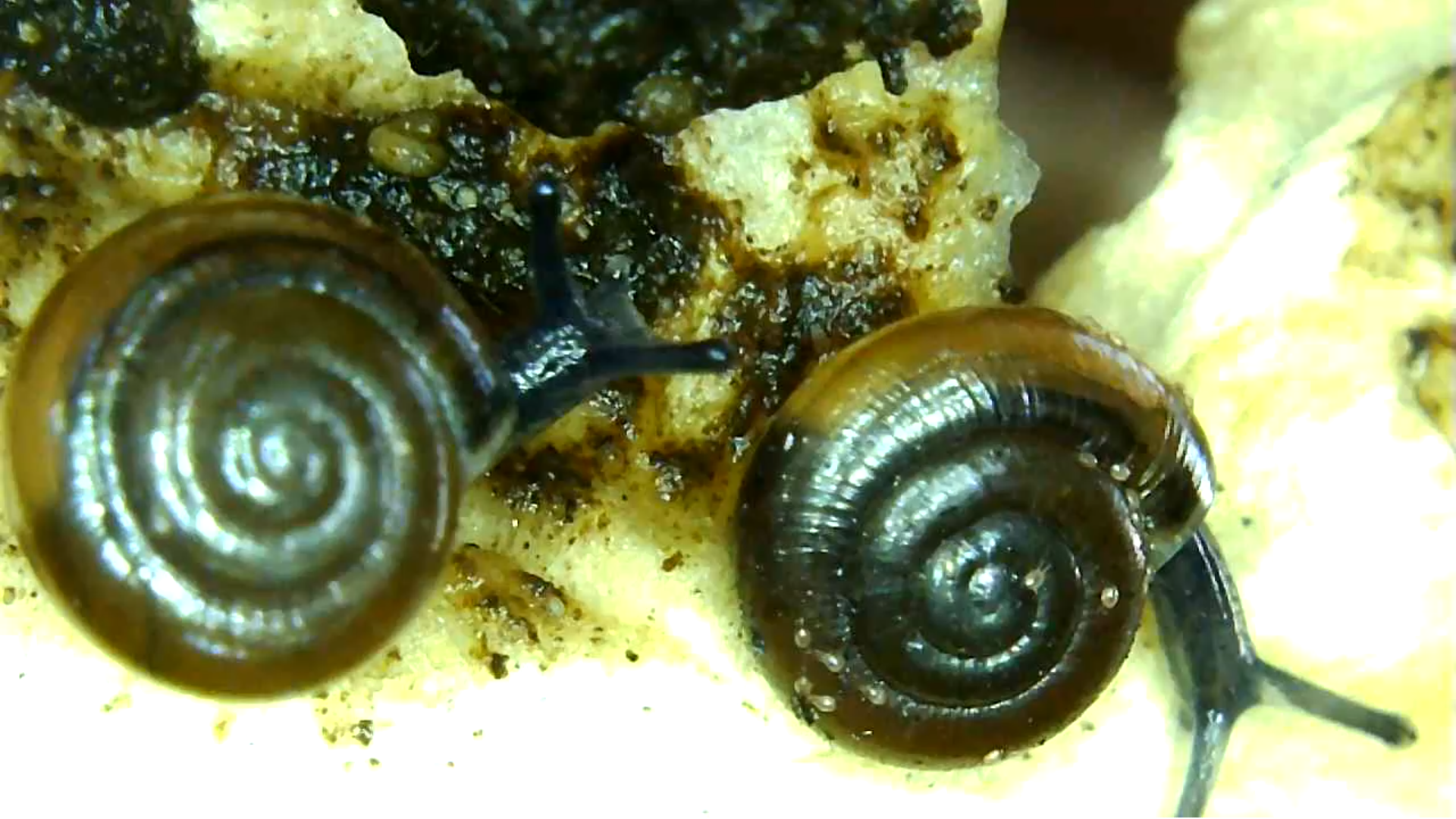
Riccardoella limacum infesting a snail of the Oxychilus family.

Riccardoella is a genus of mites belonging to the family Ereynetidae.

The species of this genus are found in Europe and Northern America.

Species:

- Riccardoella canadensis Fain & Van Goethem, 1986
- Riccardoella limacum (Schrank, 1776)
- Riccardoella novaezealandiae Fain & Barker, 2004
- Riccardoella oudemansi Thor, 1932
- Riccardoella reaumuri Fain & Van Goethem, 1986
- Riccardoella tokyoensis Waki & Shimano, 2018
