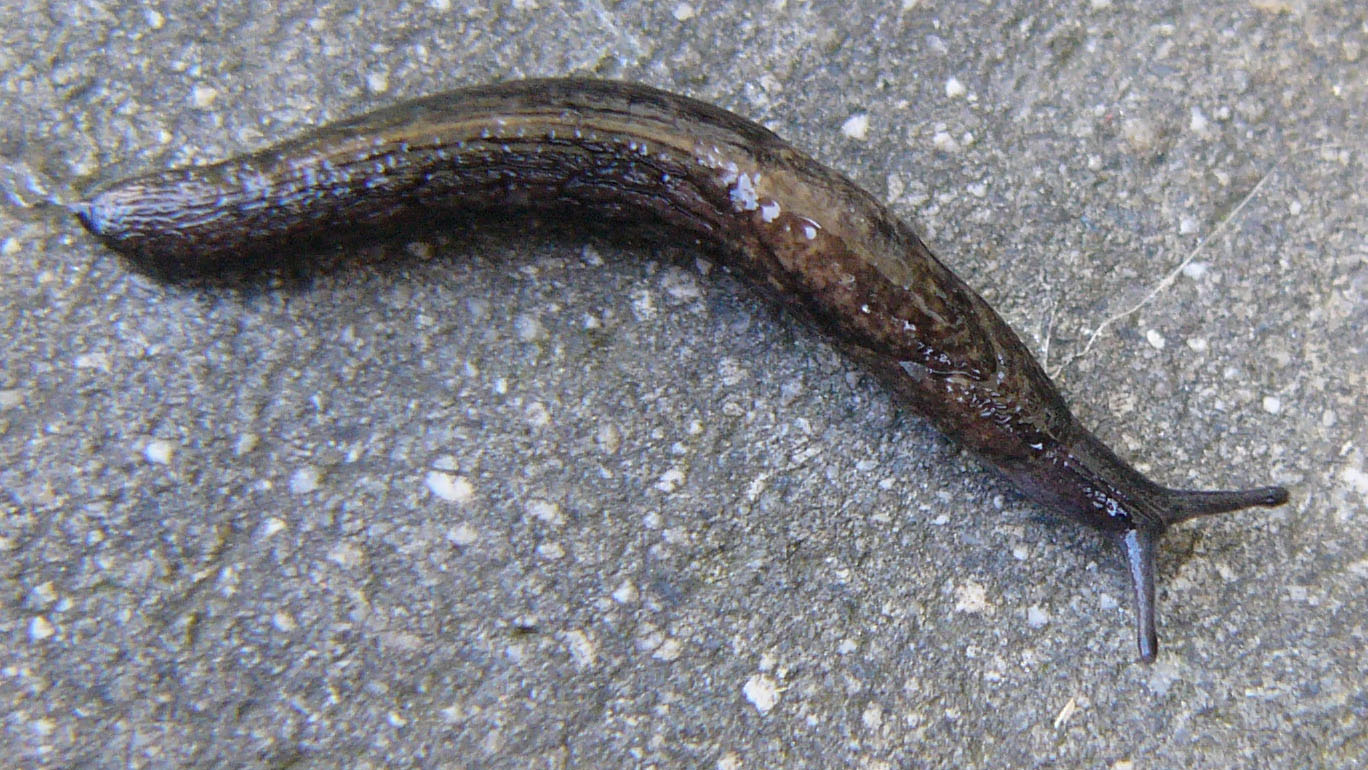
- A live individual of Tandonia budapestensis

Scientific classification
- Domain: Eukaryota
- Kingdom: Animalia
- Phylum: Mollusca
- Class: Gastropoda
- Order: Stylommatophora
- Family: Milacidae
- Genus: Tandonia; Lessona & Pollonera, 1882

Diversity
- about 30 species

= Tandonia =

Genus of gastropods

Tandonia is a genus of air-breathing, keeled, land slugs. These are shell-less terrestrial gastropod mollusks in the family Milacidae.

== Distribution ==
The distribution of the genus Tandonia includes Europe to North Africa and Asia Minor. The largest number of species are in the southern Alps.

== Description ==
The slug's body is elongate, up to 100 mm in length, and usually with almost parallel sides. The posterior par is abruptly narrowed, the keel usually low and is restricted to the last section of the dorsum in some species, reaching the mantle margin in others.

Reproductive system: The penis is usually short, the epiphallus is long. The retractor penis inserts at the boundary between the penis and epiphallus. The vas deferens of specific length opens into the posterior end of the epiphallus. The vaginal accessory glands (usually more than one) are of specific shapes, and are connected by ducts to the vagina or to the point where the vagina enters the atrium. The atrium is small and tubular, with no stimulator inside. Spermatheca are of specific size, the spermathecal duct can be longer or shorter than the spermatheca.

== Species ==
Within the genus Tandonia there are the following 29 species:

- Tandonia albanica (Soós, 1924)
- Tandonia baldensis (Simroth, 1910)
- Tandonia bosnensis Wiktor, 1986
- Tandonia budapestensis (Hazay, 1880)
- Tandonia cavicola (Simroth, 1916)
- Tandonia cretica (Simroth, 1885)
- Tandonia cristata (Kaleniczenko, 1851)
- Tandonia croatica (Wagner, 1929)
- Tandonia dalmatina (Simroth, 1900)
- Tandonia ehrmanni (Simroth, 1910)
- Tandonia fejervaryi (Wagner, 1929)
- Tandonia jablanacensis (Wagner, 1930)
- Tandonia kusceri (Wagner, 1931)
- Tandonia lagostana (Wagner, 1940)
- Tandonia macedonica (Rähle, 1974)
- Tandonia melanica Wiktor, 1986
- Tandonia nigra (Pfeiffer, 1894)
- Tandonia pageti (Forcart, 1972)
- Tandonia pinteri (Wiktor, 1975)
- Tandonia piriniana Wiktor, 1983
- Tandonia rara Wiktor, 1996
- Tandonia retowskii (Böttger, 1882)
- Tandonia reuleauxi (Clessin, 1887)
- Tandonia robici (Simroth, 1885)
- Tandonia rustica (Millet, 1843) - type species
- Tandonia samsunensis (Forcart, 1942)
- Tandonia serbica (Wagner, 1931)
- Tandonia sowerbyi (Férussac, 1823)
- Tandonia totevi (Wiktor, 1975)
