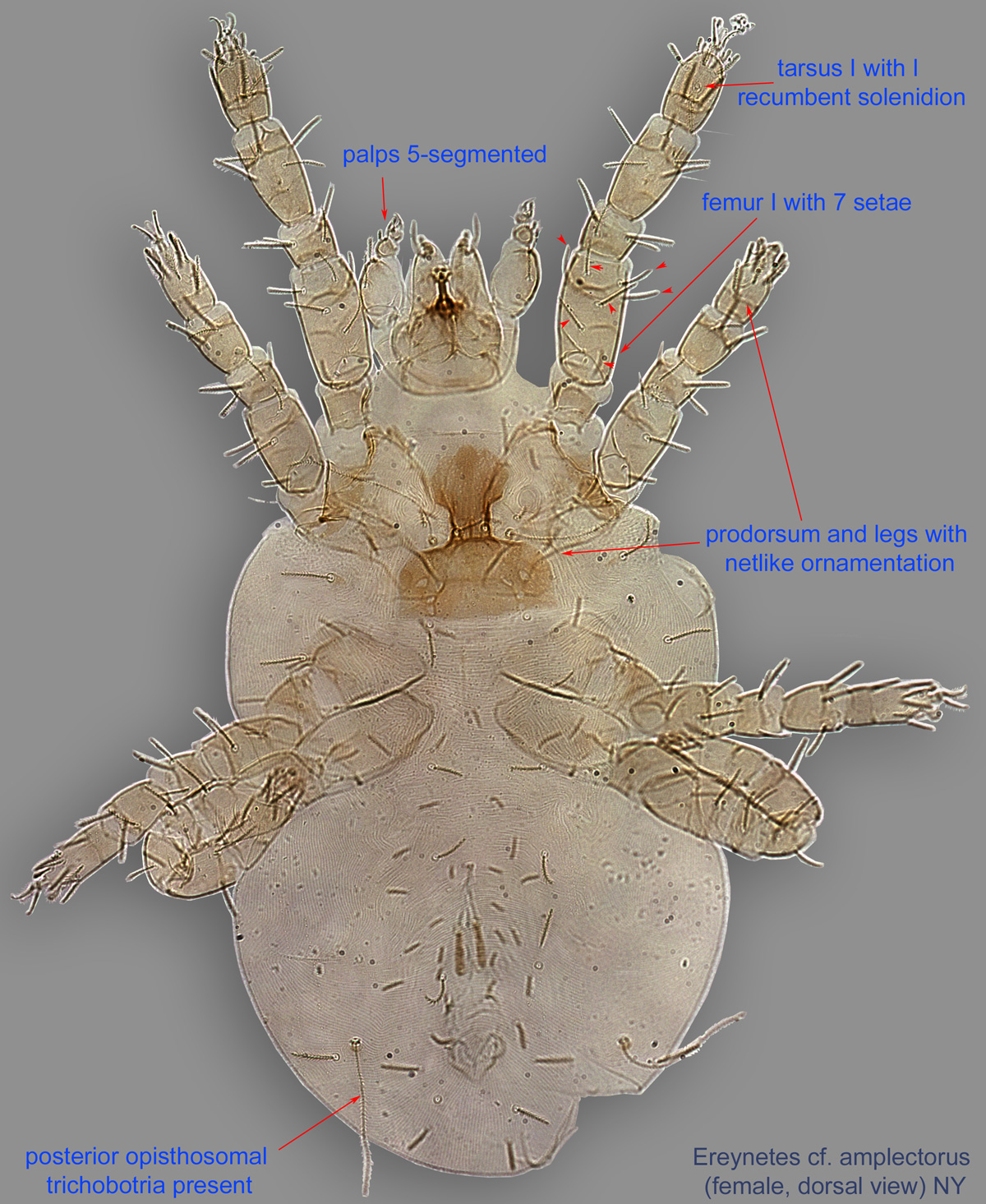

Scientific classification
- Kingdom: Animalia
- Phylum: Arthropoda
- Subphylum: Chelicerata
- Class: Arachnida
- Order: Trombidiformes
- Superfamily: Tydeoidea
- Family: Ereynetidae

= Ereynetidae =

Family of mites

Ereynetidae is a family of prostig mites in the order Trombidiformes. There are at least two genera and two described species in Ereynetidae.

== Genera ==
- Ereynetes
- Riccardoella
