= Pierre-Aimé Millet =

French naturalist

Pierre-Aimé Millet de la Turtaudière (1783 in Angers – 1873) was a French naturalist.

He was Secrétaire Général de la Société d'Agriculture d' Angers.

== Works ==
Partial list

- 1813: Mollusques terrestres et fluviatiles, observés dans le Département de Maine et Loire. pp. i.xi [= 1-11], 1-82, 1 tableau. Angers. (Pavie)
- 1854 Paléontologie de Maine et Loire : comprenant avec des observations et l'indication des diverses formations géologiques du département de Maine et Loire, un relevé des roches, des minéraux et des fossiles qui se rapportent à chacune d'elles Angers :Impr. de Cosnier et Lachèse Online here
- 1870. Faune des invertébrés de Maine et Loire comprenant les 2e, 3e et 4e embranchements du règne animal ou Seconde partie de la Faune de Maine-et-Loire, Tome premier. E. Barassé imp.-lib., Angers : 371 pp.
- 1872. Faune des invertébrés du Maine-et-Loire. Tome second. E. Barassé éd. Angers, 394 pp.

See also WorldCat listings online here
