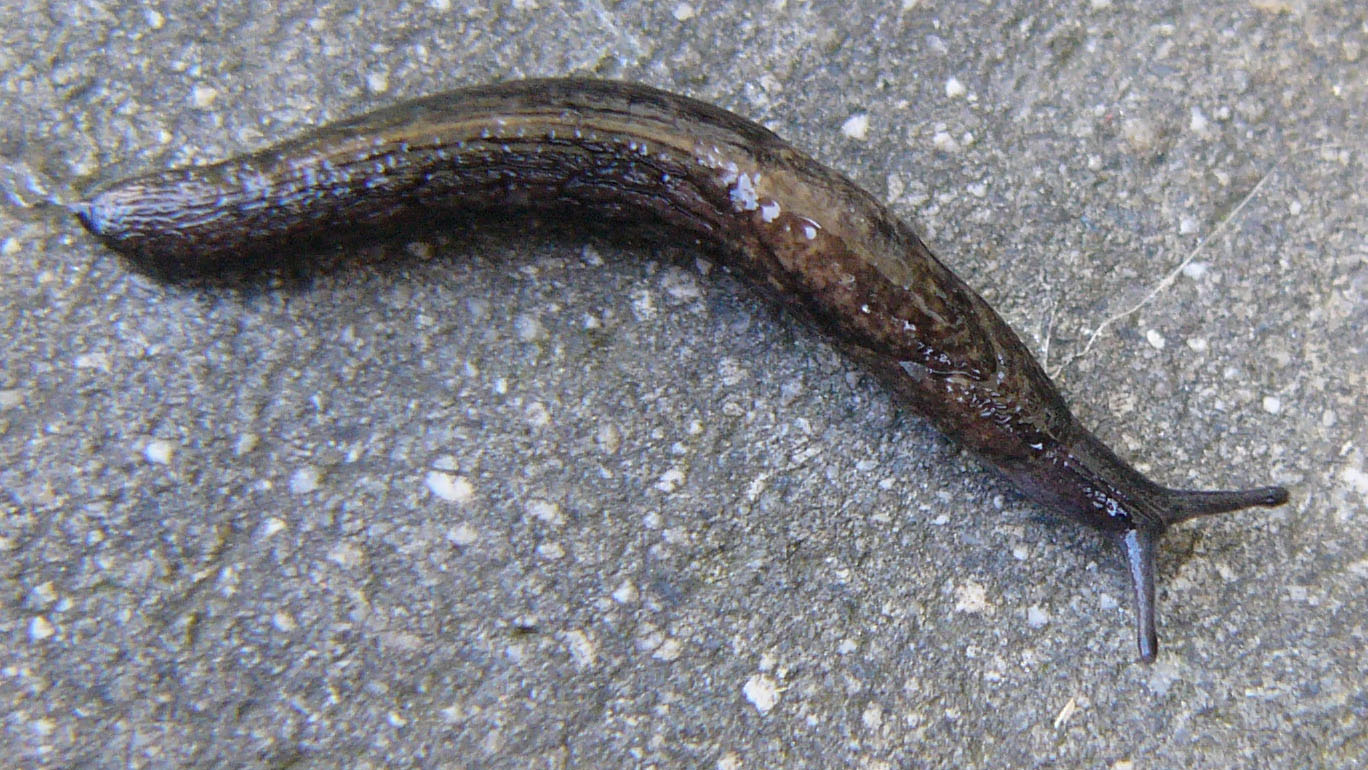
- Tandonia budapestensis

Scientific classification
- Kingdom: Animalia
- Phylum: Mollusca
- Class: Gastropoda
- Order: Stylommatophora
- Superfamily: Parmacelloidea
- Family: Milacidae; Ellis, 1926

Diversity
- 2 genera, about 50 species, less than 50 species

= Milacidae =

Family of gastropods

Milacidae is a family of air-breathing, keeled, land slugs. These are shell-less terrestrial gastropod mollusks in the superfamily Parmacelloidea.

This family has no subfamilies (according to the taxonomy of the Gastropoda by Bouchet & Rocroi, 2005).

== Distribution ==
The distribution of the Milacidae includes the western Palearctic region.

== Anatomy ==
In the Milacidae family, the number of haploid chromosomes ranges from 31 to 35 (according to the values in this table).

== Genera ==
Genera within the family Milacidae include:

- Milax Gray, 1855 - type genus
- Tandonia Lessona & Pollonera, 1882

== Cladogram ==
The following cladogram shows the phylogenic relationships of this family to the other families in the limacoid clade:

- limacoid clade
  - Staffordioidea
    Staffordiidae
  - - - Dyakioidea
        Dyakiidae
      - Gastrodontoidea
        - Pristilomatidae
        - - Chronidae
          - - Euconulidae
            - Trochomorphidae
          - - Gastrodontidae
            - Oxychilidae
    - - Parmacelloidea
        - Trigonochlamydidae
        - Parmacellidae
        - Milacidae
      - - - Zonitoidea
            Zonitidae
          - Helicarionoidea
            - Helicarionidae
            - - Ariophantidae
              - Urocyclidae
        - Limacoidea
          - Vitrinidae
          - - Boettgerillidae
            - - Limacidae
              - Agriolimacidae
