= Eupera bahamensis =

Scientific classification
- Kingdom: Animalia
- Phylum: Mollusca
- Class: Bivalvia
- Order: Sphaeriida
- Family: Sphaeriidae
- Genus: Eupera
- Species: E. bahamensis

Binomial name
- Eupera bahamensis (Clench, 1938)

Synonyms
- Byssanodonta bahamensis Clench, 1938

Species of mollusk

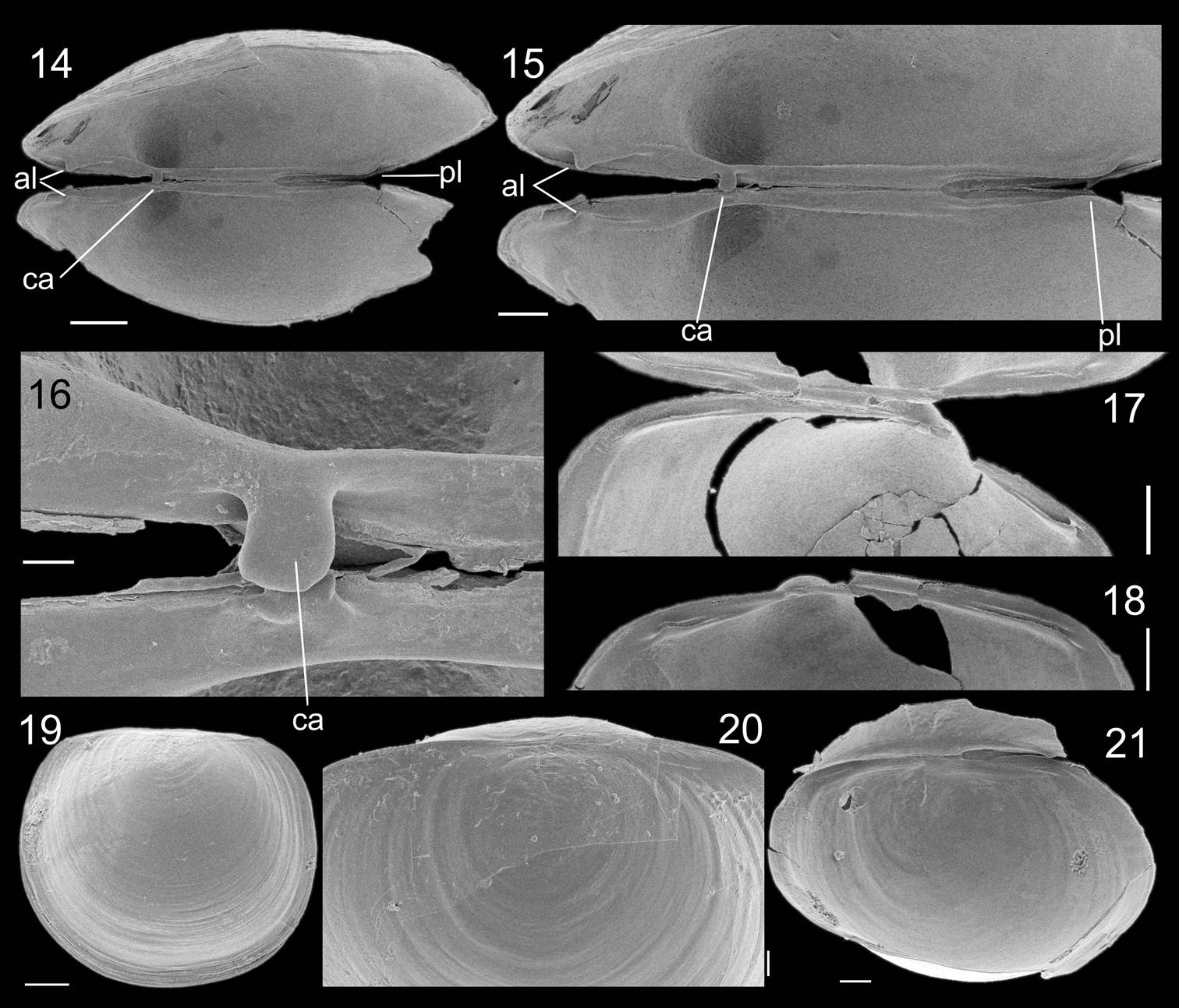
Eupera troglobia is a species of the same genus.

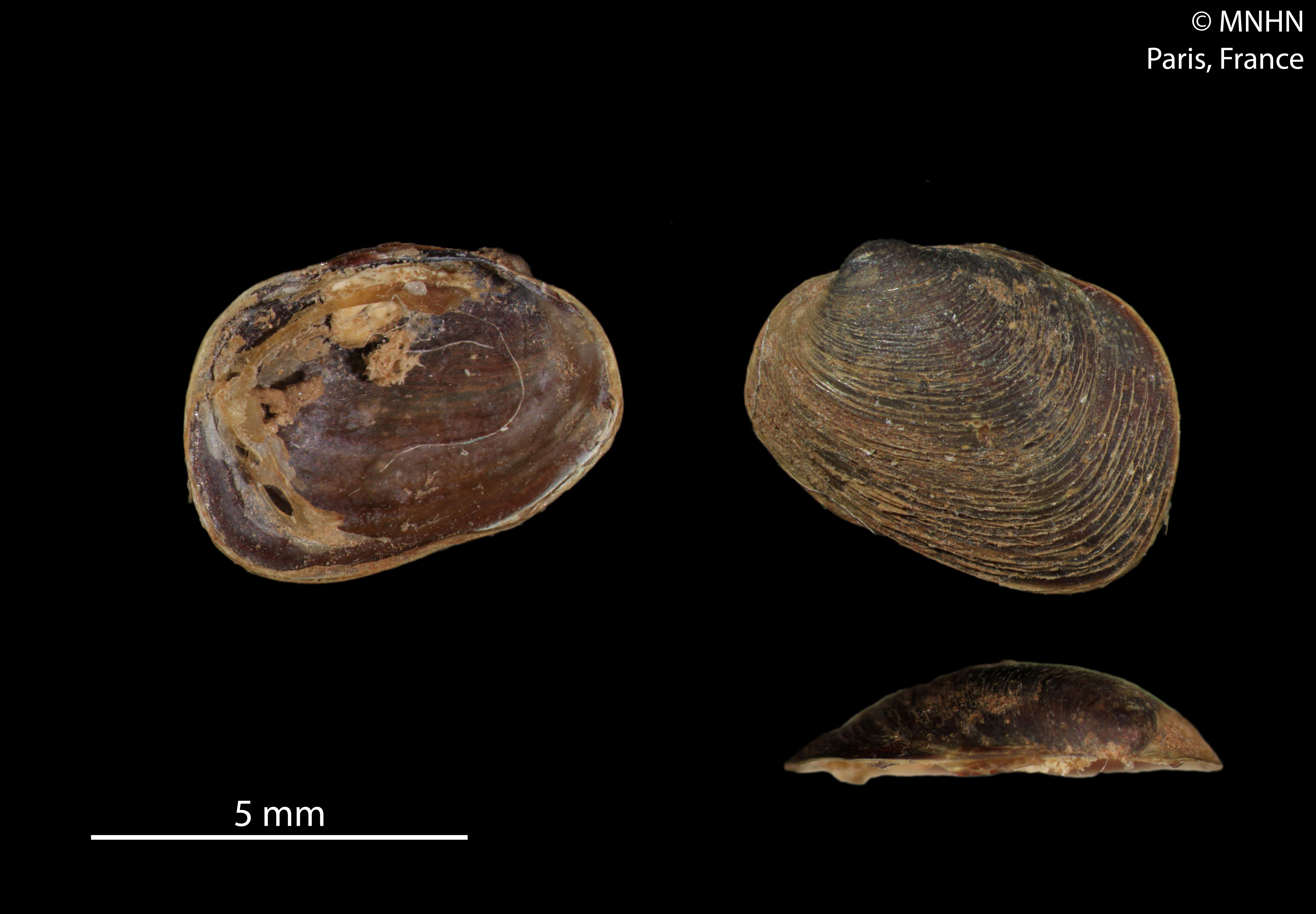
Eupera guaraniana is another species of the same genus.

Eupera bahamensis is a mollusk species that inhabits fresh waters of the Bahamas in the Caribbean. E. bahamensis was first described in 1938 on Cat Island by William J. Clench. The species rank is accepted and has no known subspecies.
