= Eupera =

Scientific classification
- Domain: Eukaryota
- Kingdom: Animalia
- Phylum: Mollusca
- Class: Bivalvia
- Order: Sphaeriida
- Family: Sphaeriidae
- Genus: Eupera; Bourguignat, 1854

Genus of bivalves

Eupera is a genus of bivalves belonging to the family Sphaeriidae.

The species of this genus are found in America and Africa.

Species:

- Eupera bahamensis (Clench, 1938)
- Eupera bahiensis (Spix, 1827)
- Eupera barbadensis (Prime, 1861)
- Eupera crassa (Mandahl-Barth, 1954)
- Eupera cubensis (Prime, 1865)
- Eupera degorteri (Kuiper, 1954)
- Eupera doellojuradoi Klappenbach, 1962
- Eupera elliptica Ituarte & Mansur, 1993
- Eupera ferruginea (F.Krauss, 1848)
- Eupera gravis H.B.Baker, 1930
- Eupera guaraniana Ituarte, 1994
- Eupera haitiensis Klappenbach, 1970
- Eupera iguazuensis Ituarte, 1989
- Eupera insignis Pilsbry, 1925
- Eupera klappenbachi Mansur & Veitenheimer, 1975
- Eupera meridionalis (Prime, 1861)
- Eupera missouriensis Bickel, 1976
- Eupera modioliforme (Anton, 1837)
- Eupera moquiniana Bourguignat, 1854
- Eupera onestae (McLearn, 1929)
- Eupera ovata (Mandahl-Barth, 1954)
- Eupera parvula (Prime, 1865)
- Eupera pittieri von Martens, 1900
- Eupera platensis Doello-Jurado, 1921
- Eupera portoricensis (Prime, 1861)
- Eupera primei Klappenbach, 1967
- Eupera simoni (Jousseaume, 1889)
- Eupera singleyi (Pilsbry, 1889)
- Eupera sturanyi (Waagen, 1905)
- Eupera sublaevigata (d'Orbigny, 1850)
- Eupera triangularis Mandahl-Barth, 1973
- Eupera troglobia (Simone & Ferreria, 2022)
- Eupera tumida (Clessin, 1879)
- Eupera veatleyi (C.B.Adams, 1849)
- Eupera ventricosa (Clessin, 1882)
- Eupera viridans (Prime, 1865)
- Eupera weinlandi (Clessin, 1882)
- Eupera yucatanensis
