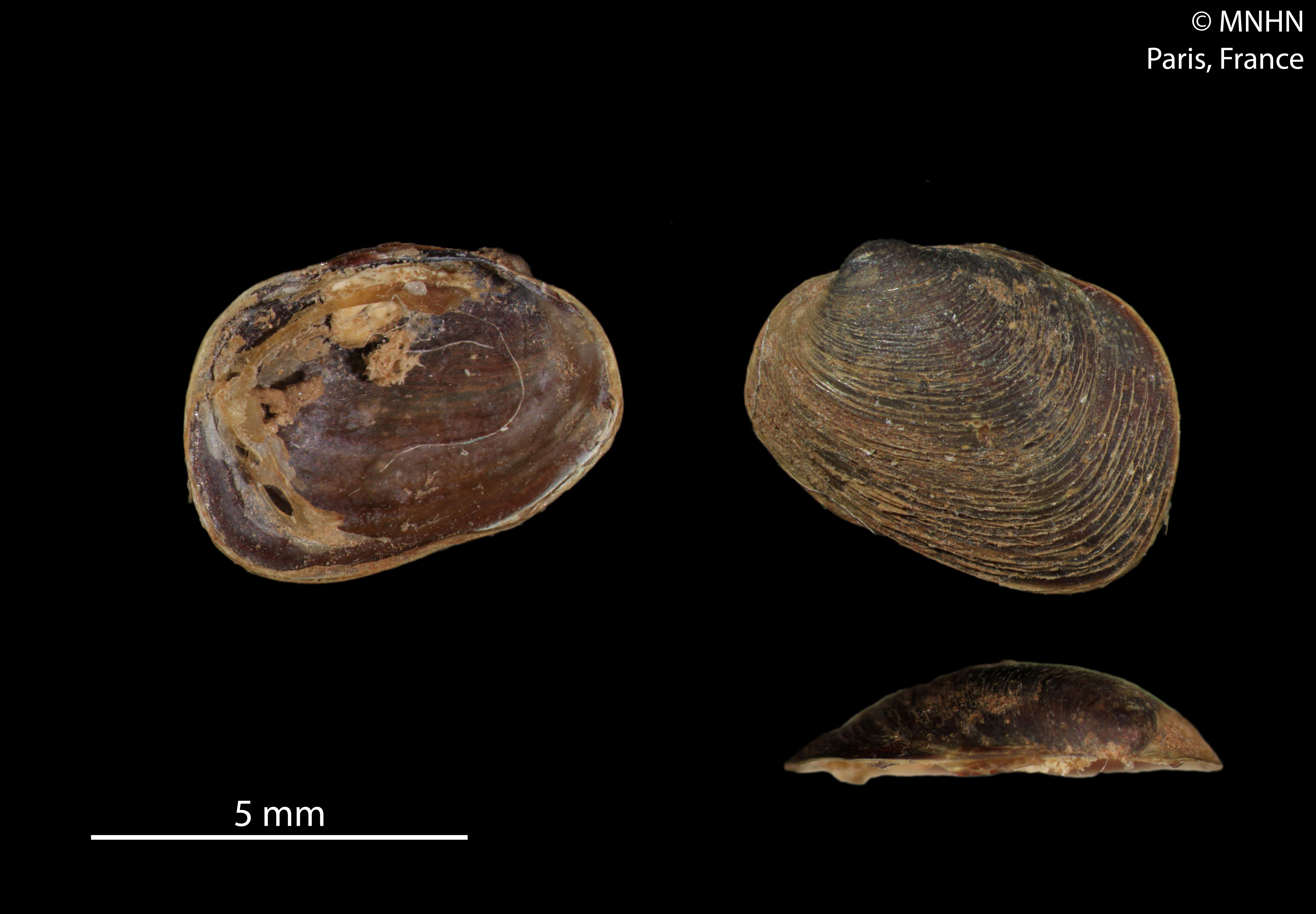
- Specimen MNHN-IM-2012-37708

Scientific classification
- Domain: Eukaryota
- Kingdom: Animalia
- Phylum: Mollusca
- Class: Bivalvia
- Order: Sphaeriida
- Family: Sphaeriidae
- Genus: Eupera
- Species: E. guaraniana

Binomial name
- Eupera guaraniana (Ituarte, 1994)

= Eupera guaraniana =

Species of mollusk

Eupera guaraniana is a species of freshwater mollusk inhabiting the Uruguay River in South America. The species was discovered in 1994 by Cristián Ituarte.
