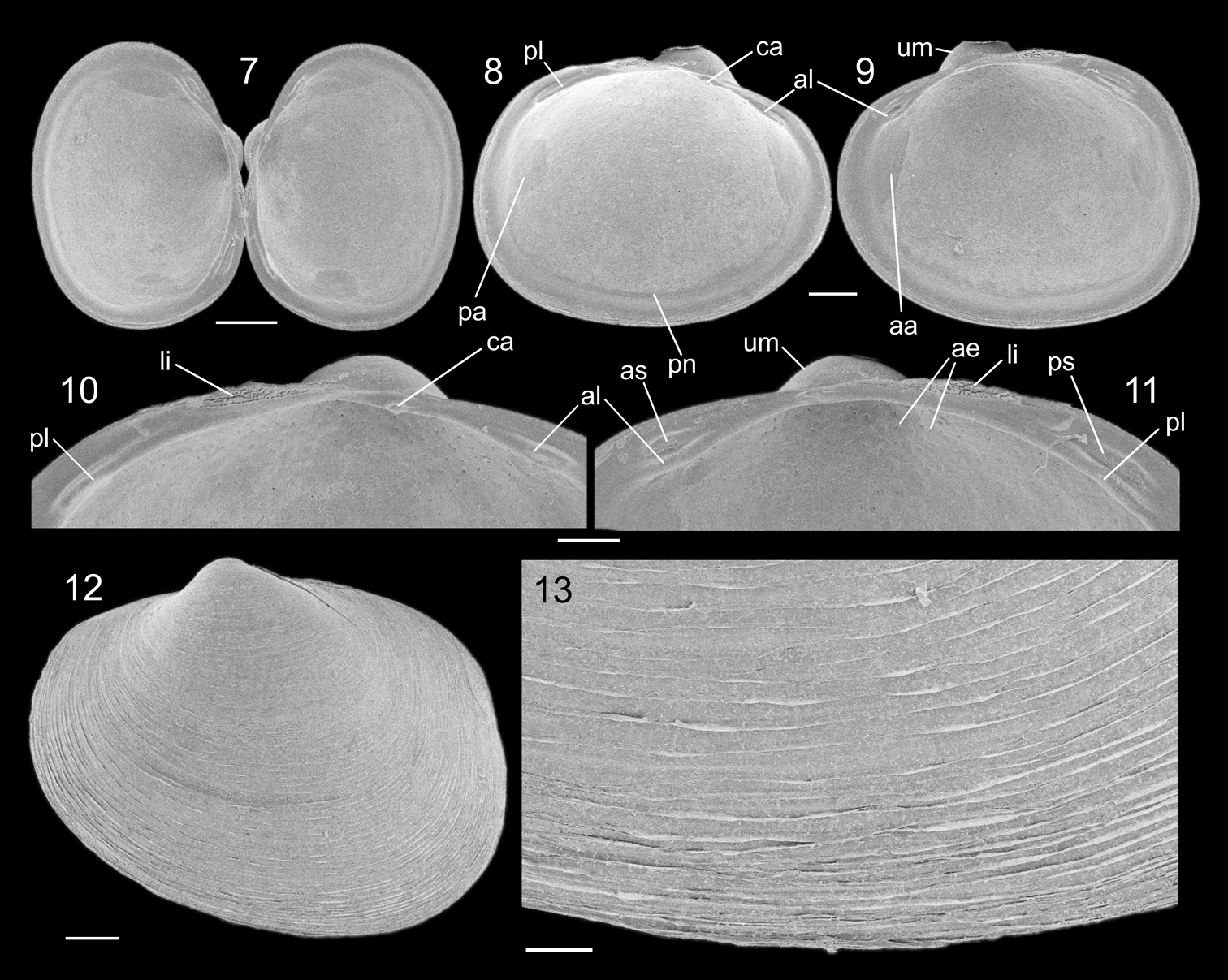

Scientific classification
- Domain: Eukaryota
- Kingdom: Animalia
- Phylum: Mollusca
- Class: Bivalvia
- Order: Sphaeriida
- Family: Sphaeriidae
- Genus: Eupera
- Species: E. troglobia

Binomial name
- Eupera troglobia Simone & Ferreira, 2022

= Eupera troglobia =

Species of mollusc

Eupera troglobia is a species of mollusc that lives in caves. The discovery of E. troglobia makes it the first troglobitic bivalve from the Americas (North America and South America). The holotype collected was named holotype MZSP 155717 and the paratype MZSP 155716. All were discovered in eastern subterranean Brazil at Casa Pedra cave 10°49'28.4''S, 49°37'16.5''W. Records of the species date back to 2006 in the technical report of Brazil's National Center of Cave Exploration and Conservation.

== Description ==
Eupera trolobia adults are ~4.5 millimetres (0.18 in) in length and lack pigmentation in the soft parts and shell. The wall of the shell is thin, making it fragile. It is translucent with a bit of light yellow or light greenish yellow. The anterior edge is rounded and smaller than the posterior edge. In medium specimens, the ventral edge is rounded and is slight ascentent to larger specimens. The sculpture of uniform concentric growth lines around ~15 per millimeter. The growth lines are usually continuous from the anterior up to the posterior hinge region.
