= Ambigolimax nyctelius =

Scientific classification
- Kingdom: Animalia
- Phylum: Mollusca
- Class: Gastropoda
- Order: Stylommatophora
- Superfamily: Limacoidea
- Family: Limacidae
- Genus: Ambigolimax
- Species: A. nyctelius

Binomial name
- Ambigolimax nyctelius (Bourguignat, 1861)

Species of land slug

The name Ambigolimax nyctelius (and similarly Lehmannia nyctelia and Limax nyctelius) has been used to refer to several species of air-breathing land slugs (terrestrial pulmonate gastropod molluscs) in the family Limacidae. An article published in 2022 revealed this confusion and furthermore showed that the original description applied to a slug species in a different family. The above names are therefore no longer appropriate and care is need to interpret the meaning of earlier usages.

The following five species were confused:

- Letourneuxia nyctelia (family Arionidae) is the slug originally described. Until 2022 it was mostly known as Letourneuxia numidica;
- Ambigolimax waterstoni is believed native in Algeria but has been reported also from South Africa, Australia, New Zealand, Elba and some Scottish botanic gardens;
- Ambigolimax parvipenis is a widespread invasive species in the British Isles and California, and has been reported also from Algeria, Spain, France, Greece and Arizona;
- Lehmannia carpatica occurs mostly at high altitudes along the chain of the Carpathian Mountains and in other ranges further south from Albania to Bulgaria;
- Simroth and Pollonera used the species name nyctelia for a poorly known species from North Africa attributed to the genus Malacolimax.
