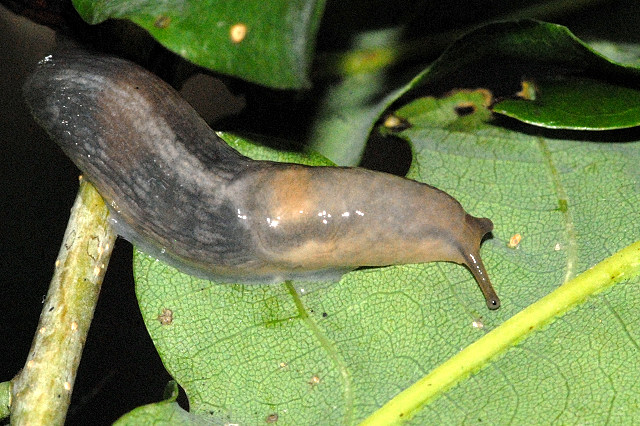
- Lehmannia marginata

Scientific classification
- Kingdom: Animalia
- Phylum: Mollusca
- Class: Gastropoda
- Order: Stylommatophora
- Family: Limacidae
- Subfamily: Limacinae
- Genus: Lehmannia; Heynemann, 1863

Type species
- Lehmannia marginata (O.F. Müller, 1774)

= Lehmannia =

Genus of slugs

Lehmannia is a genus of air-breathing land slugs in the family Limacidae, the keelback slugs. The genus is distributed in Europe with one species introduced to North America.

== Description ==
These are narrow-bodied slugs up to 8 centimeters long. The mantle covers less than a third of the body length. They are cream-colored to brown or black, usually with at least two longitudinal stripes along the mantle. The sole of the foot is lightest in the middle. The penis is short compared to those of Limax, and in shape it may be "tubular, baggy, or claviform" (club-shaped). The mucus is watery.

== Biology ==
Many species live in mountain habitat, where they can be found on trees and rocks and feed on lichens. Reports of L. marginata from North Africa are liable to be a misidentification of Ambigolimax valentianus. Otherwise the genus is known only from Europe and Iceland, with L. marginata probably an introduction to eastern North America.

== Species ==
Some of these species were originally described as species of Limax, and Lehmannia was treated as a subgenus of that genus. Later, there has been disagreement whether some species in Lehmannia should be transferred to a separate genus Ambigolimax or whether this should be considered a subgenus of Lehmannia. A 2026 molecular phylogeny has confirmed earlier genetic studies in finding that Lehmannia would be paraphyletic if it were to include Ambigolimax (because of Malacolimax and Weltersia species); hence they should be separate genera.

- Lehmannia brunneri (H. Wagner, 1931)
- Lehmannia carpatica Hutchinson, Reise & Schlitt, 2022
- Lehmannia horezia Grossu & Lupu, 1962
- Lehmannia islandica Forcart, 1966 now synonymised with L. marginata
- Lehmannia janetscheki Forcart, 1966 now synonymised with L. marginata
- Lehmannia jaroslaviae Grossu, 1967
- Lehmannia macroflagellata Grossu et Lupu, 1962
- Lehmannia marginata (O.F. Müller, 1774) – tree slug (type species)
- Lehmannia medioflagellata Lupu, 1968
- Lehmannia requienii Pollonera, 1896
- Lehmannia rupicola Lessona & Pollonera, 1882
- Lehmannia sarmizegetusae Grossu, 1970
- Lehmannia szigethyae Wiktor, 1975
- Lehmannia vrancensis Lupu, 1973

In addition, the following species now in Ambigolimax were sometimes earlier placed in Lehmannia

- Ambigolimax melitensis (Lessona & Pollonera, 1882)
- Ambigolimax valentianus (Férussac, 1822) – Valencia slug, threeband garden slug

The name Lehmannia nyctelia (= Ambigolimax nyctelius) is no longer valid. The species originally given the species name is in the genus Letourneuxia, but the name has been mistakenly applied to three other species (L. carpatica, Ambigolimax parvipenis and Ambigolimax waterstoni).
