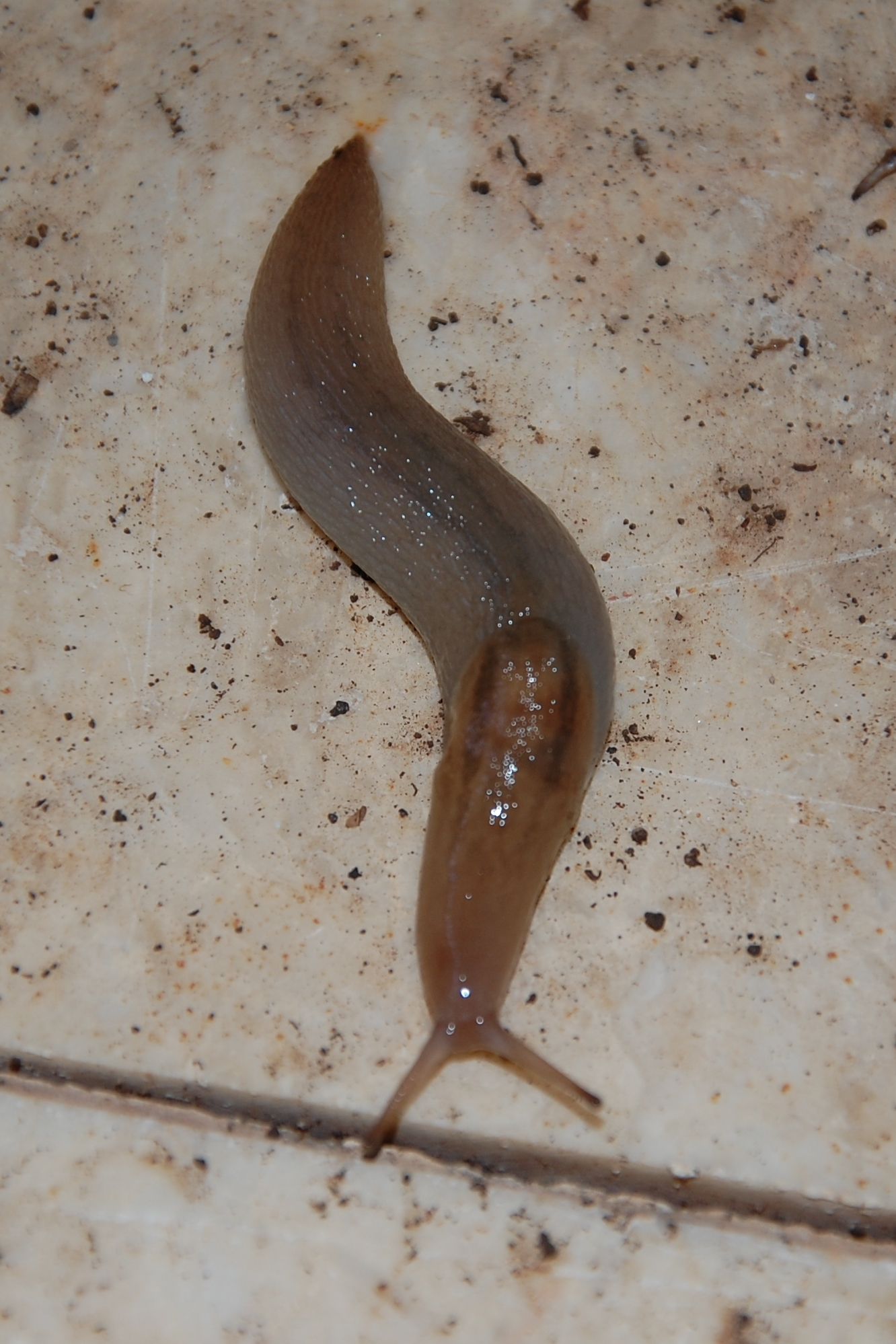
- Ambigolimax melitensis from Sicily

Scientific classification
- Kingdom: Animalia
- Phylum: Mollusca
- Class: Gastropoda
- Order: Stylommatophora
- Superfamily: Limacoidea
- Family: Limacidae
- Genus: Ambigolimax
- Species: A. melitensis

Binomial name
- Ambigolimax melitensis (Lessona & Pollonera, 1882)

Synonyms
- Lehmannia melitensis (Lessona & Pollonera, 1882) superseded combination; Limax melitensis Lessona & Pollonera, 1882 superseded combination (basionym)

= Ambigolimax melitensis =

Species of gastropod

Ambigolimax melitensis is a species of air-breathing land slug, a pulmonate gastropod mollusc in the family Limacidae.

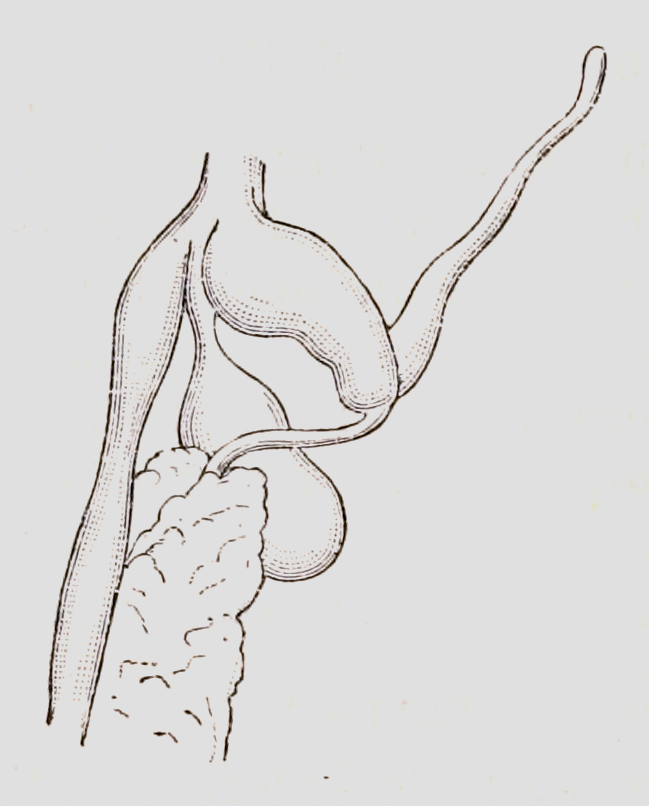
Pollonera's drawing of the penis, showing the distinctive flagellum

== Description ==
The formal species description copies an inadequate description by Arturo Issel of juveniles collected at the main gate of Valletta on Malta. Fortunately, one of the authors, Carlo Pollonera, subsequently published a more informative description of a specimen from this type locality, including a figure of the genitalia. The distinctive character is the long flagellum on the penis. The external appearance can be a uniform pale ash-grey, as specified in the original description, but the species can also be brown with prominent darker stripes on the mantle and back, indistinguishable from other Ambigolimax species. Length up to 70 mm. As with other limacid slugs, the tail is pointed and the pneumostome lies in the hind part of the mantle.

== Taxonomy ==
The species has at different times been placed in the genera Limax, Malacolimax, and Lehmannia as well as in its own monotypic subgenus Melitolimax. DNA sequences were necessary to prove that it belongs in the genus Ambigolimax and is most closely related to Ambigolimax parvipenis.

== Distribution ==
The distribution of this species includes Malta and Italy (Sicily, Aeolian Islands, Sardinia, and the Tuscan Archipelago). It also has been found in Tunisia and Algeria.

== Karyotype ==
The chromosome number is 2n = 40.

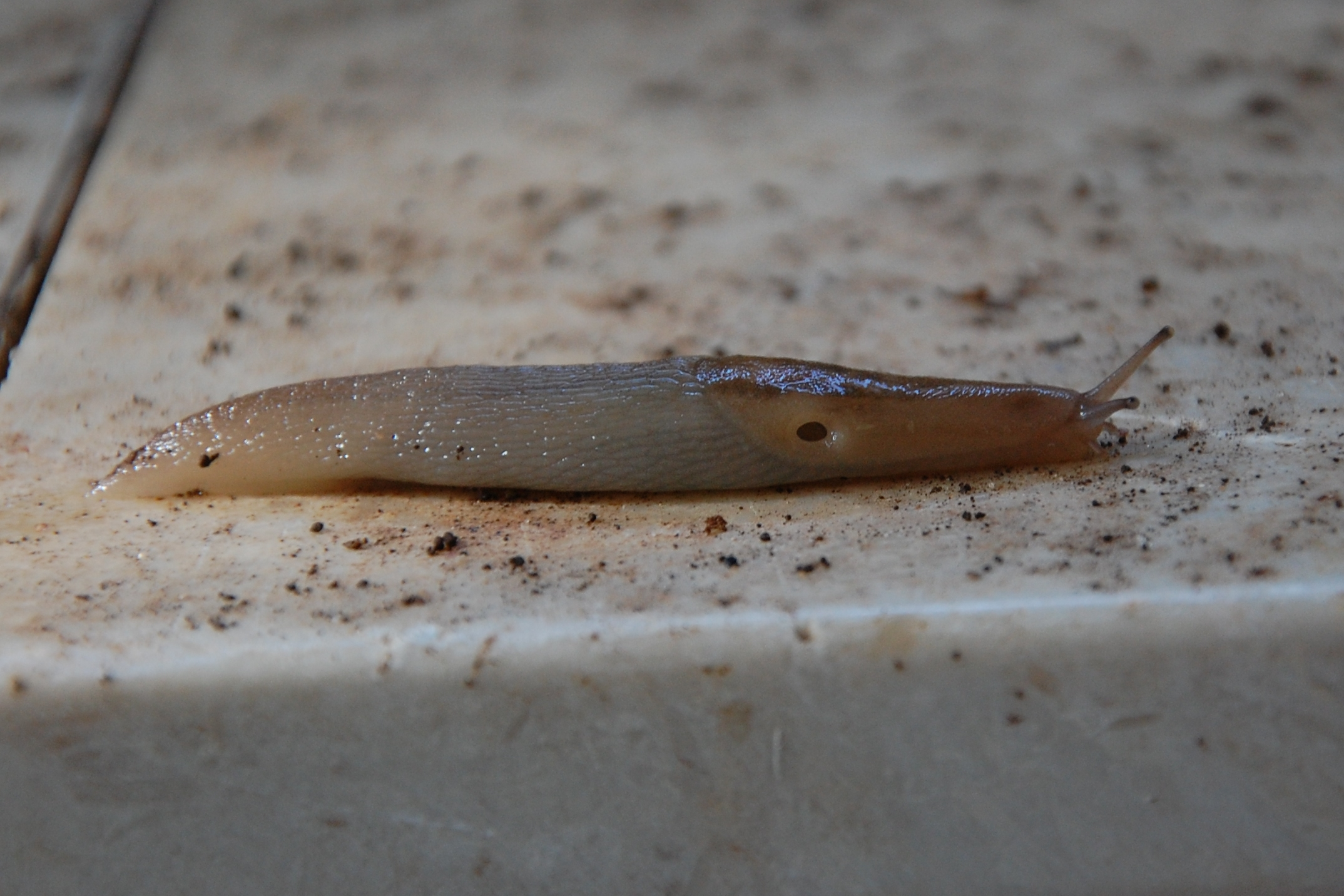
A. melitensis showing the pneumostome

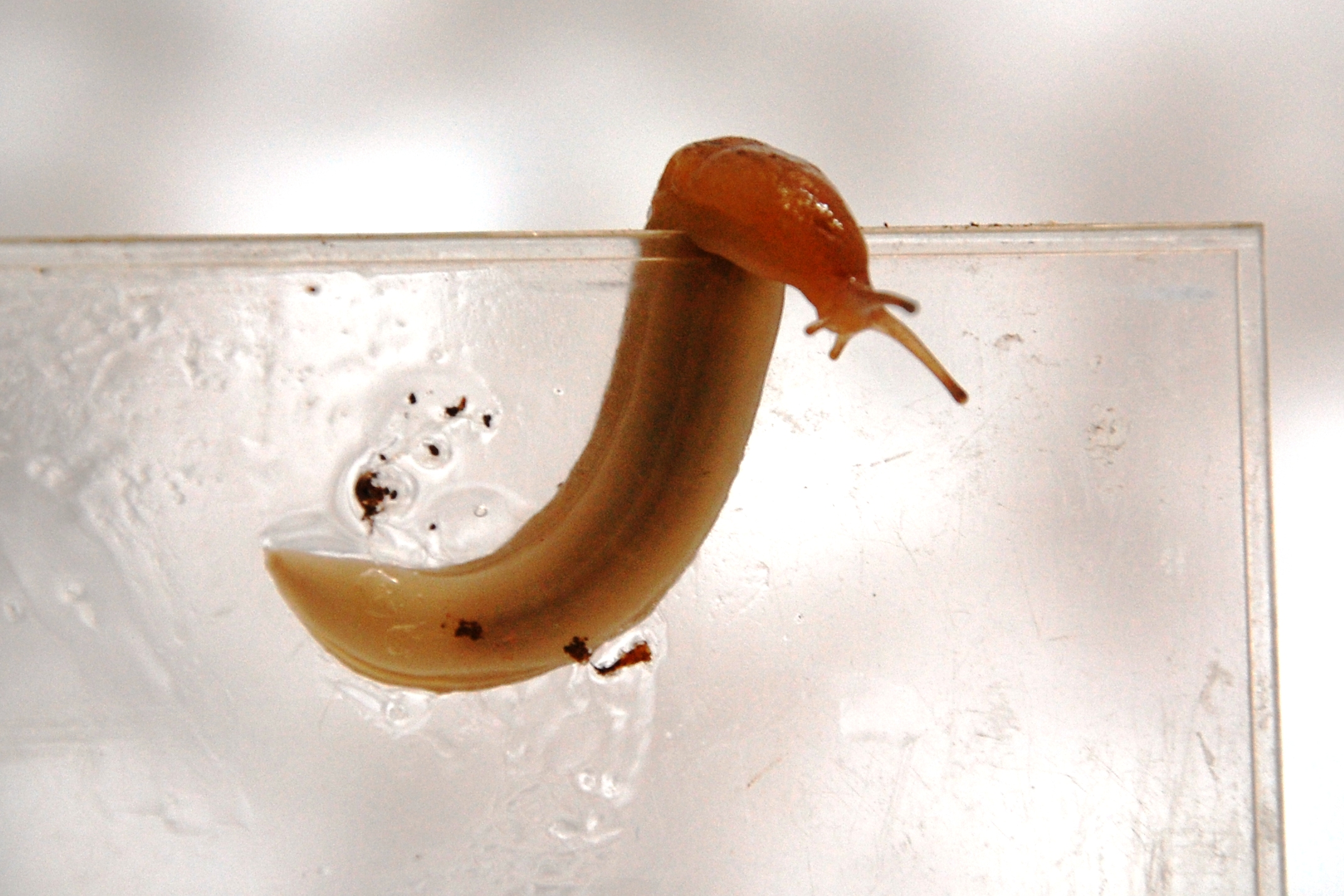
The foot
