= Ambigolimax wiktori =

Conservation status
- Endangered (IUCN 3.1)

Scientific classification
- Kingdom: Animalia
- Phylum: Mollusca
- Class: Gastropoda
- Order: Stylommatophora
- Family: Limacidae
- Genus: Ambigolimax
- Species: A. wiktori

Binomial name
- Ambigolimax wiktori (Alonso & Ibanez, 1989)

Synonyms
- Malacolimax wiktori

Species of gastropod

Ambigolimax wiktori is a species of air-breathing land slug, a terrestrial pulmonate gastropod mollusc in the family Limacidae, the keelback slugs.

The species was discovered in 1984 on the university campus in La Laguna, Tenerife, one of the Canary Islands. At this time it was also found in other adjacent towns in the north of the island (Geneto and Tequeste). However, more recent searches there have failed to relocate it, perhaps because the area has become more built up.

There has been speculation whether the species might be a synanthropic introduction. However, subsequently museum specimens have turned up that had been collected in 2006 at two sites over 20 km away in more natural habitats. This supports the working assumption that it is endemic to the Canary Islands.

The species was described in the genus Malacolimax because it lacks an intestinal caecum, like other members of that genus. However, subsequent genetic analysis has shown that it in fact belongs in the genus Ambigolimax.

The species name wiktori honours Andrzej Wiktor (1931–2018), a Polish slug expert.
