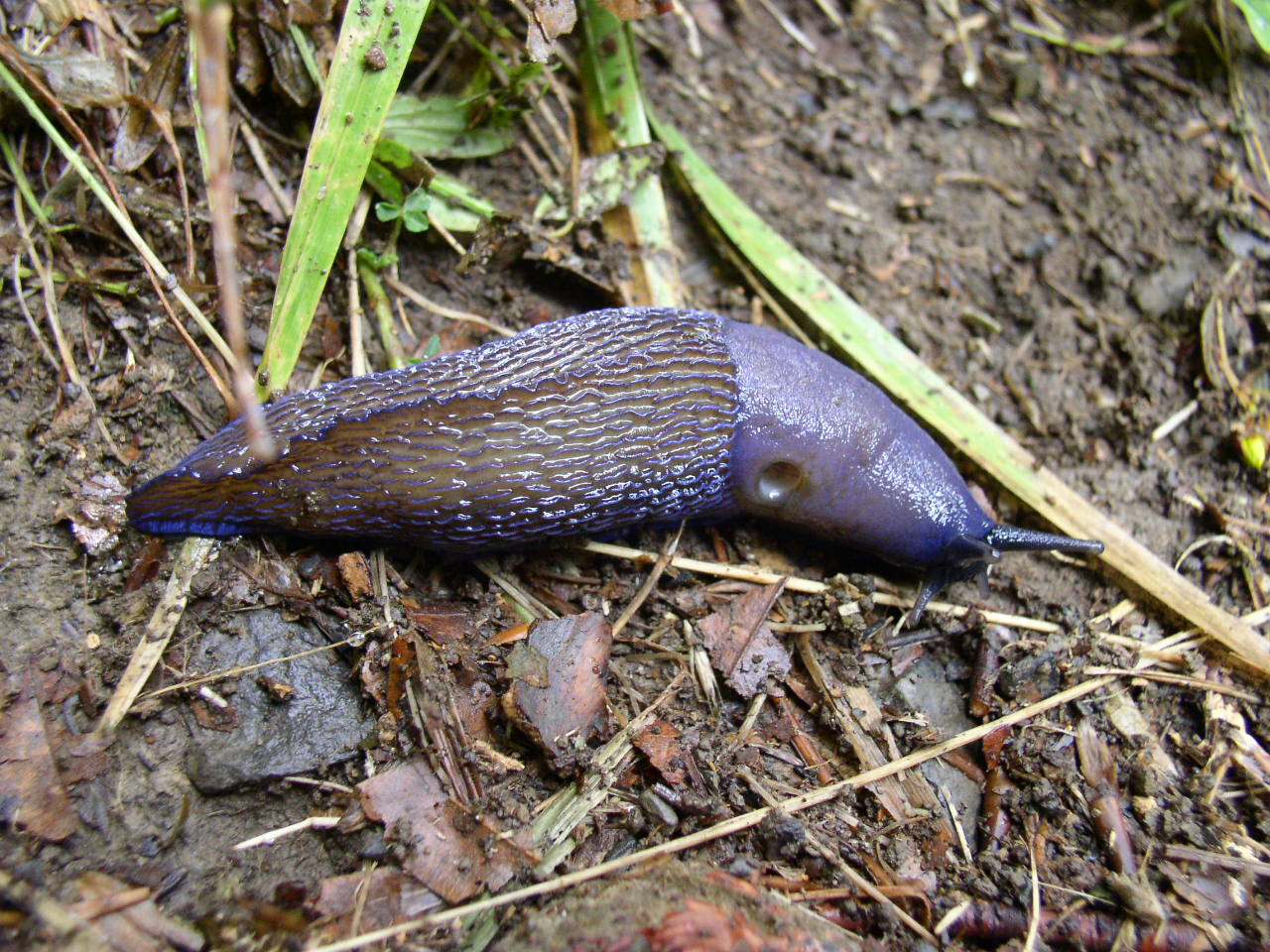

Conservation status
- Least Concern (IUCN 3.1)

Scientific classification
- Kingdom: Animalia
- Phylum: Mollusca
- Class: Gastropoda
- Order: Stylommatophora
- Family: Limacidae
- Genus: Bielzia; Clessin, 1887
- Species: B. coerulans

Binomial name
- Bielzia coerulans (M. Bielz, 1851)
- Range of B. coerulans Extant, resident

Synonyms
- Limax coerulans Bielz, 1851; Limax schwabi Frauenfeld, 1864

= Bielzia =

Species of gastropod

Bielzia coerulans, commonly known as the Carpathian blue slug or simply the blue slug, is a species of very large land slug, a terrestrial pulmonate gastropod in the family Limacidae, the keelback slugs.

== Taxonomy ==
Bielzia coerulans was discovered in 1847 and described under the name Limax coerulans by Austrian–Hungarian malacologist Michael Bielz (1787–1866) in 1851. (His son E.A. Bielz was also a malacologist.)

Bielzia coerulans is the only species in the genus Bielzia.

Some authors, for example Russian malacologists, have classified Bielzia as the only genus (monotypic) within the family Bielzidae (= Limacopsidae) or the subfamily Bielziinae (I.M. Likharev & Wiktor, 1980). These opinions have since turned out to be incompatible with the phylogeny based on DNA sequences, which places Bielzia as most closely related to limacid genera such as Ambigolimax and Lehmannia. Thus the Limacopsidae and Bielziinae are synonyms of Limacidae and Limacinae.

== Distribution ==
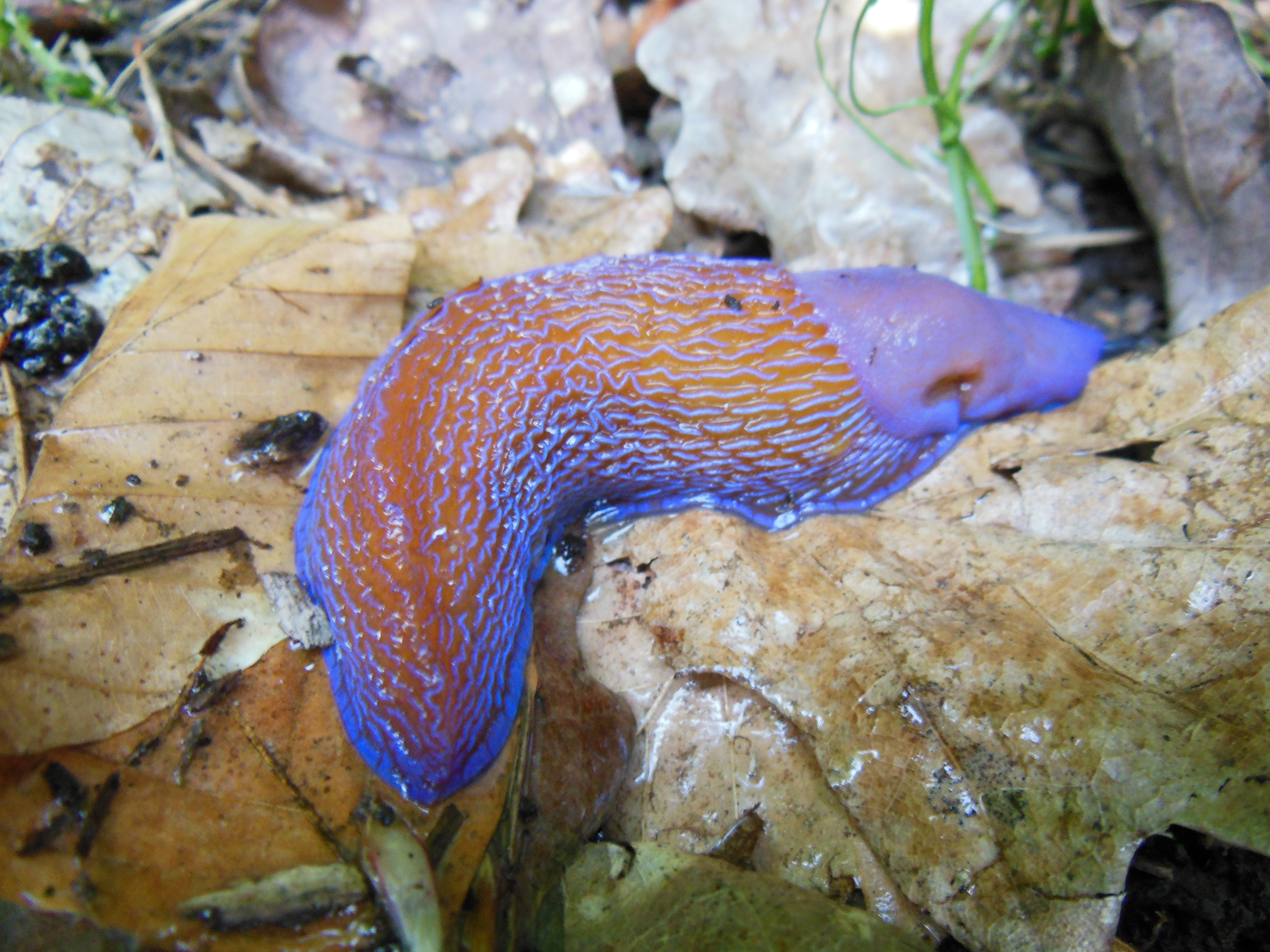
Bielzia coerulans

This species is endemic to the Carpathian Mountains in Central and Eastern Europe.

The type locality of Bielzia coerulans is the South Carpathians in Romania.

- Czech Republic - in Moravia only, vulnerable (VU) in Moravia
- Southern Poland
- Slovakia
- Ukraine
- Romania
- Hungary
- Germany (presumed introduction in Westerwald, Rhineland-Palatinate, discovered 2012)

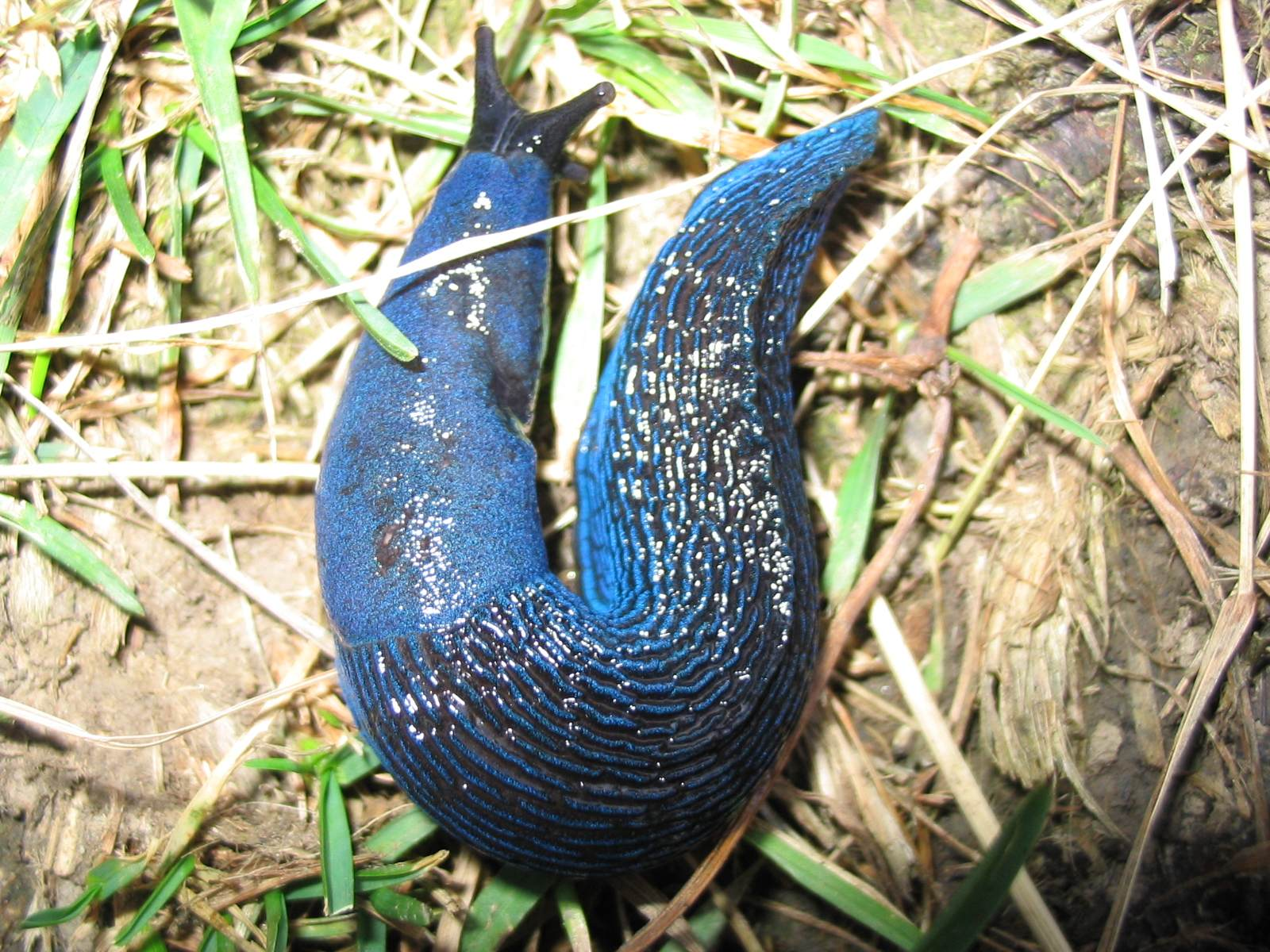
Adults of Bielzia coerulans are blue

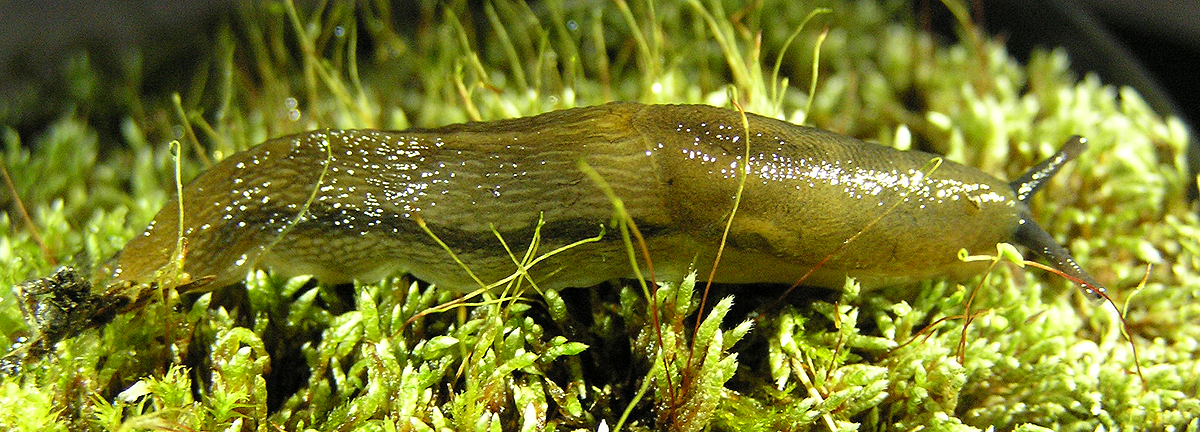
Juveniles of Bielzia coerulans are brown

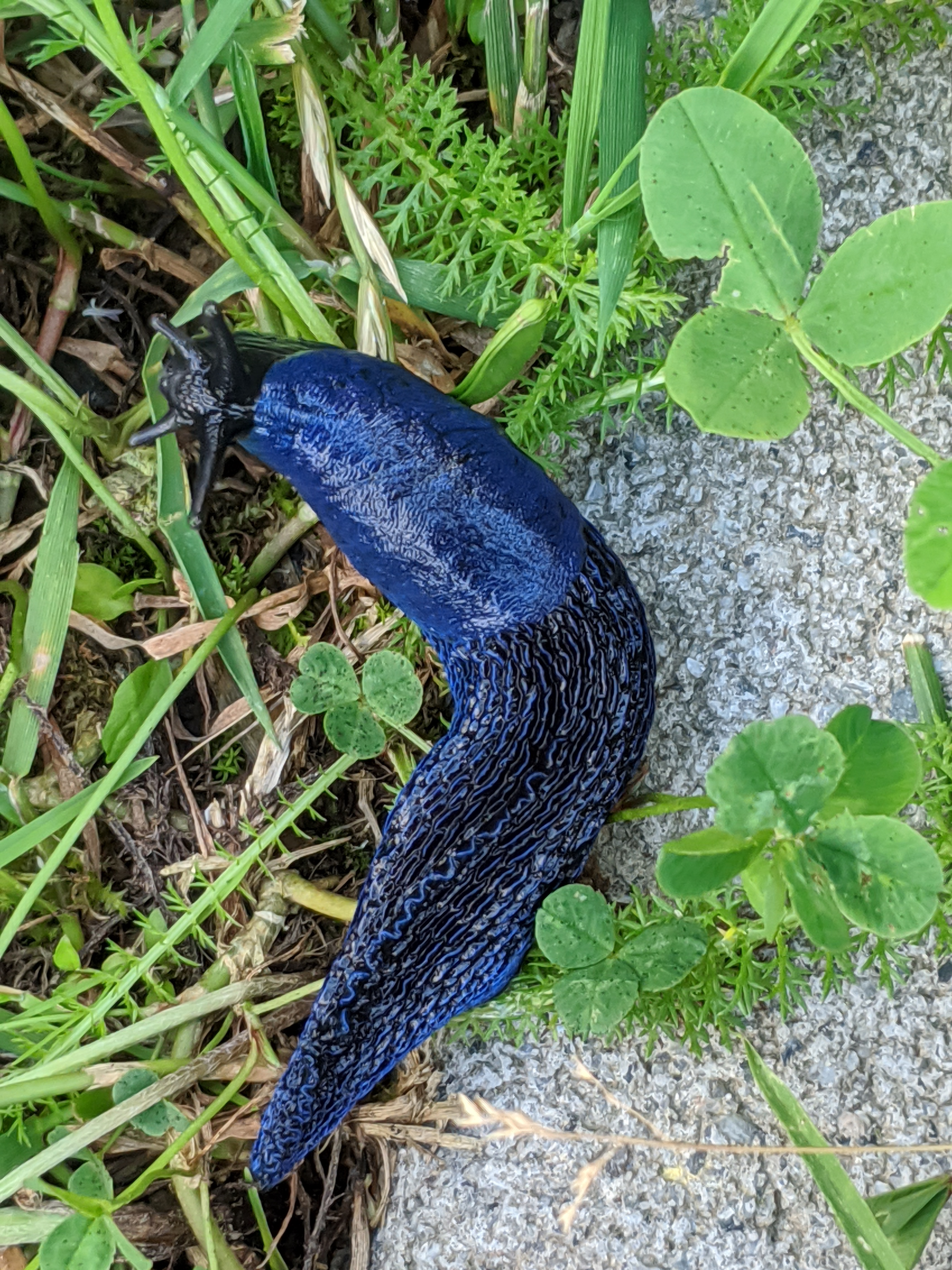
Bielzia coerulans found in Ukrainian Carpathians

== Description ==
This slug turns blue when an adult and becomes 100 – 140 mm in length. It is evenly blue or bluish green (occasionally black) with a dark greyish head and tentacles, and margins pale yellowish, sole pale yellowish or whitish.

Juveniles are yellowish brown with dark lateral bands.

Reproductive system: Genitalia are without penis. There is only an accessory organ for copulation.

== Ecology ==
Bielzia coerulans inhabits deciduous and coniferous forests in mountains, usually at the bottom, or under dead wood logs.

Maturity is in June to July. Copulation occurs at the soil. There are 30-80 eggs laid in one clutch. Adults die after egg deposition. Half grown juveniles hibernate. Fully grown slugs appear in May.
