= Lehmannia islandica =

Conservation status
- Data Deficient (IUCN 3.1)

Scientific classification
- Kingdom: Animalia
- Phylum: Mollusca
- Class: Gastropoda
- Order: Stylommatophora
- Family: Limacidae
- Genus: Lehmannia
- Species: L. islandica

Binomial name
- Lehmannia islandica (Forcart, 1966)

Synonyms
- L. marginata

Species of gastropod

Lehmannia islandica was described as a species of air-breathing land slug, a shell-less pulmonate gastropod mollusk in the family Limacidae. It is now proposed to be a synonym of Lehmannia marginata. It was considered endemic to Iceland but was listed as "Data Deficient" in the IUCN red list due to a lack of detailed distribution data and the co-occurrence with L. marginata.

== Description ==
Like other limacids, these slugs are slim with a pointed tail, and the pneumostome lies in the posterior half of the mantle. The original description claimed that L. islandica differed from Lehmannia marginata in being smaller (20 cm) and in its penis being "thickened in its distal section, with a long and pointed flagellum". However, subsequently these differences have been considered within the range of variation of L. marginata, and also the DNA of an Islandic individual fitting the morphological description did not suggest a difference from that species.
