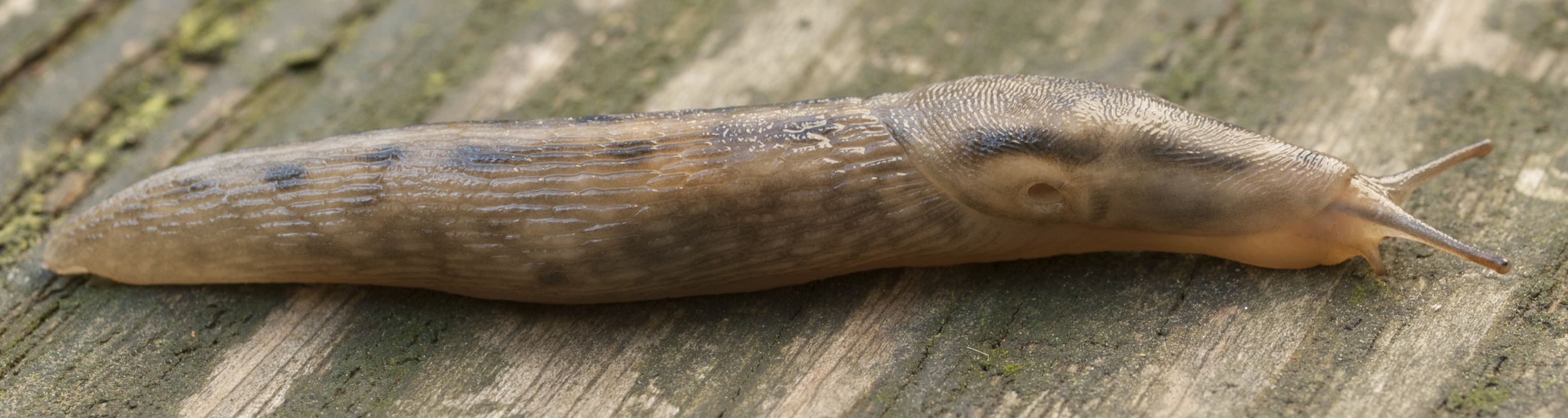

Scientific classification
- Domain: Eukaryota
- Kingdom: Animalia
- Phylum: Mollusca
- Class: Gastropoda
- Order: Stylommatophora
- Family: Limacidae
- Subfamily: Limacinae
- Genus: Lehmannia
- Species: L. carpatica

Binomial name
- Lehmannia carpatica Hutchinson, Reise & Schlitt, 2022

Synonyms
- Lehmannia nyctelia (Bourguignat, 1861); Limax nyctelius Bourguignat, 1861

= Lehmannia carpatica =

Species of land slug

Lehmannia carpatica is a species of air-breathing land slug, a terrestrial pulmonate gastropod mollusc in the family Limacidae.

== Taxonomy ==
When Grossu & Lupu (1963) first noted this species, in Romania, its long penis and lack of penial appendage led it to be confused with Ambigolimax waterstoni, which at that time was incorrectly named as Limax nyctelius; the later renamings as Lehmannia nyctelia or Ambigolimax nyctelius remained incorrect. Only in 2022 was the confusion recognised, requiring both A. waterstoni and L. carpatica to be formally described as distinct species. The same article described a third species, Ambigolimax parvipenis that had also been called Lehmannia nyctelia and confused with the other two; the article further pointed out that the original name Limax nyctelius referred to a species of Letourneuxia.

Lehmannia carpatica had also been misidentified as Mesolimax braunii in an article published in 1898.

The adjective carpatica refers to the Carpathian Mountains, along the length of which the species occurs. The type locality is Morskie Oko in the High Tatra Mountains of Poland.

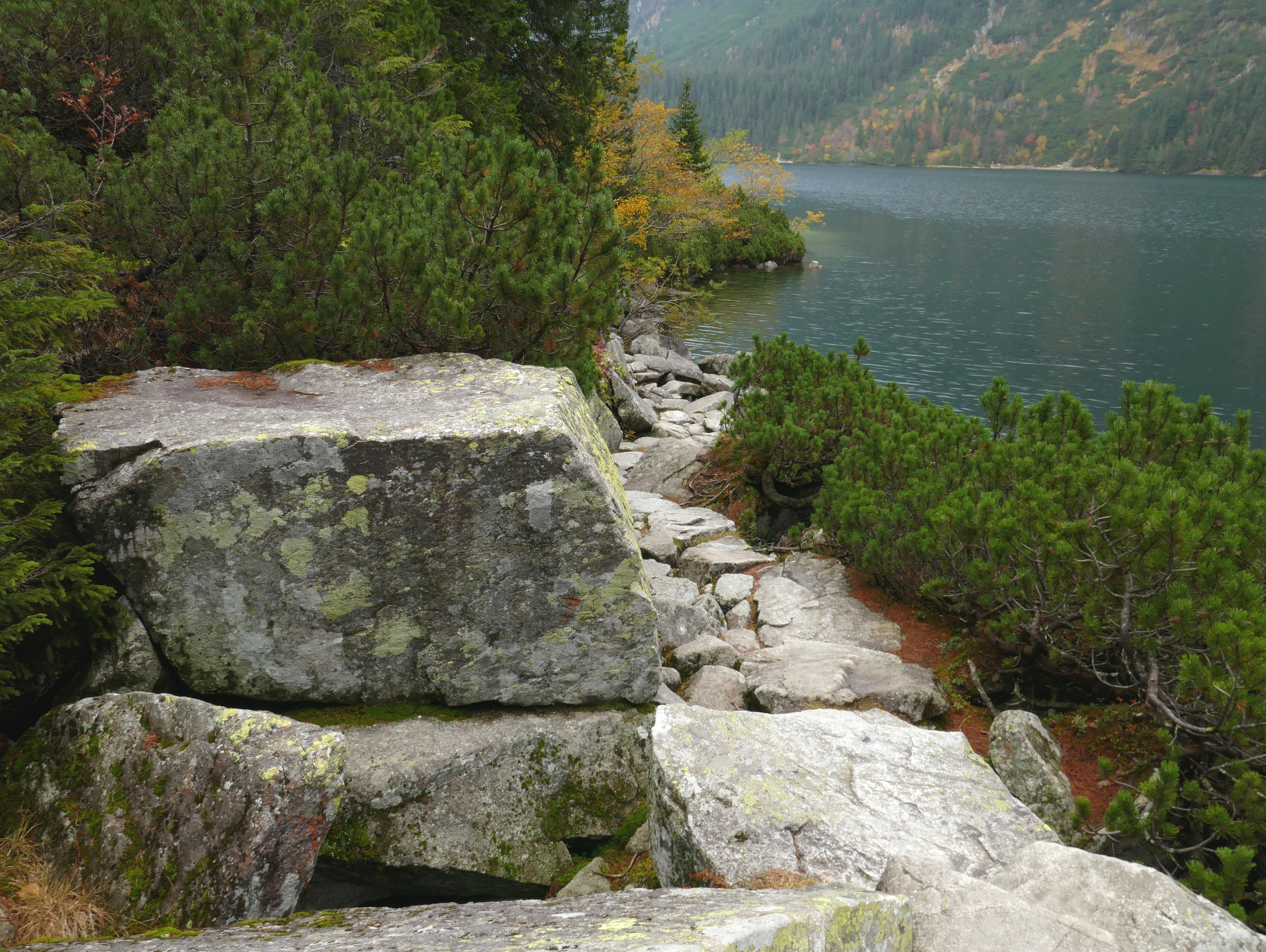
Lichen-covered rocks, the habitat of L. carpatica at its type locality, Morskie Oko, 1400 m a.s.l., High Tatras

== Occurrence and distribution ==
Lehmannia carpatica occurs at high elevations along the Carpathian Mountains, in the Czech Republic, Slovakia, Poland, Hungary, Romania and Serbia. It also occurs in mountains further south, in Albania, Montenegro and Bulgaria. In both eastern Bulgaria and southern Poland there are also records from lower-altitude woodland.

The slugs graze lichens on trees and rocks, and appear only at night or in the rain.

== Description ==
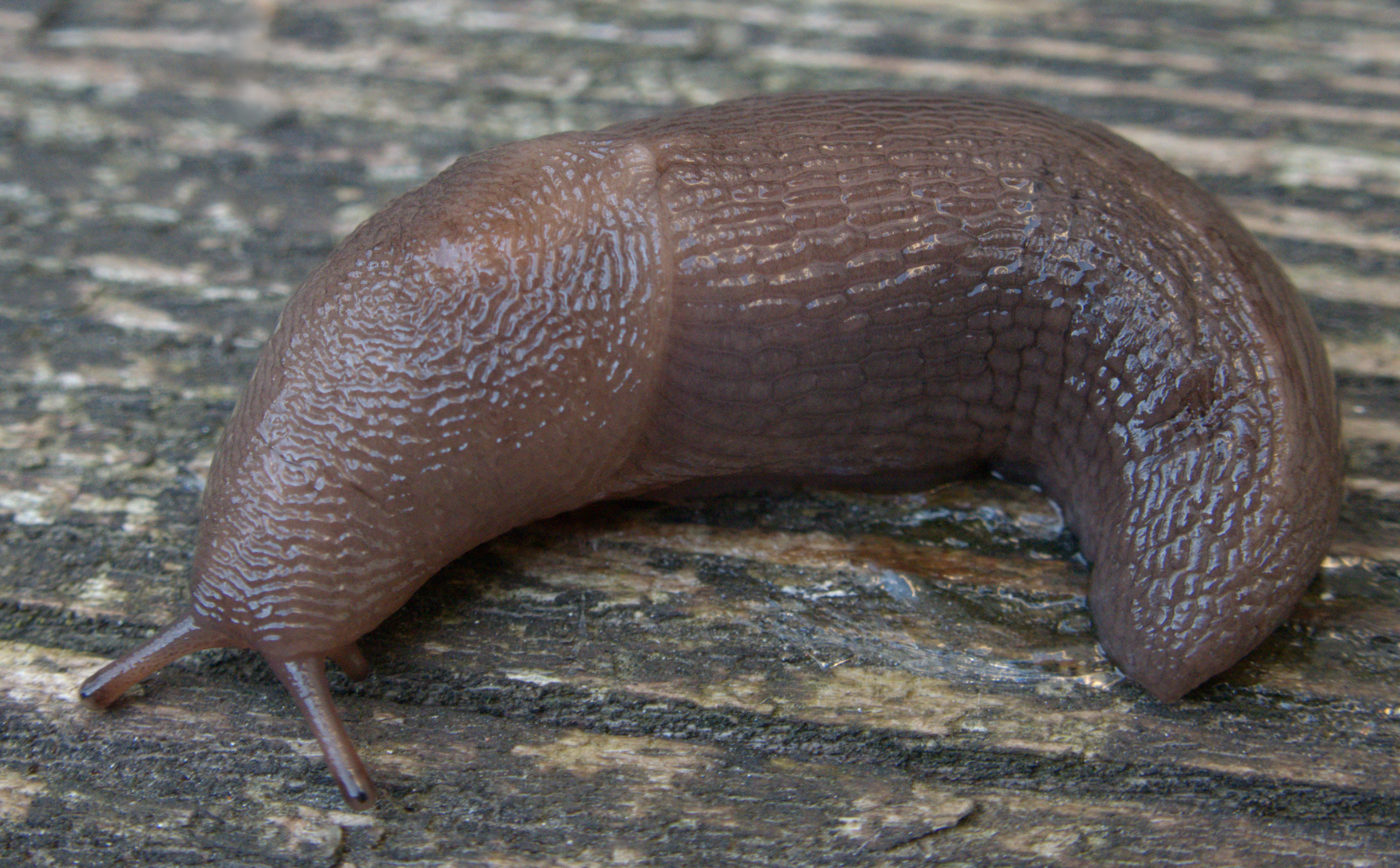
The melanistic form, found at high altitudes

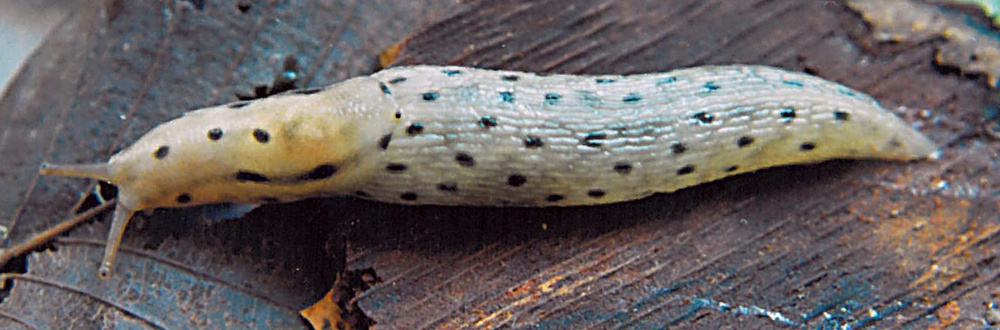
The untypical spotted pattern found in Moravia: photo M. Horsák

Genitalia: note the long penis

The species grows to about 5 cm long (when crawling). Like other limacids, the animals are slim with a pointed tail, and the pneumostome lies is the posterior half of the mantle. Lehmannia carpatica usually has a mottled dirty-grey to greyish-brown appearance, similar to a number of other Lehmannia species such as L. marginata. A pale line runs along the midline of the back, bordered by darker markings. On the mantle, dark lines run along both sides, and there may also be dark central blotches in the middle. At high altitudes melanistic forms sometimes occur, and in Moravia a distinctive form occurs with dark spots on a pale background.

The penis is long, without a penial appendage, although penis length varies considerably. These characters are shared with Ambigolimax waterstoni, but that species has two prominent flaps running along the inside of the penis whereas these are lacking in L. carpatica, which instead has a prominent funnel-like structure at the end of the penis, surrounding the connection to the vas deferens.
