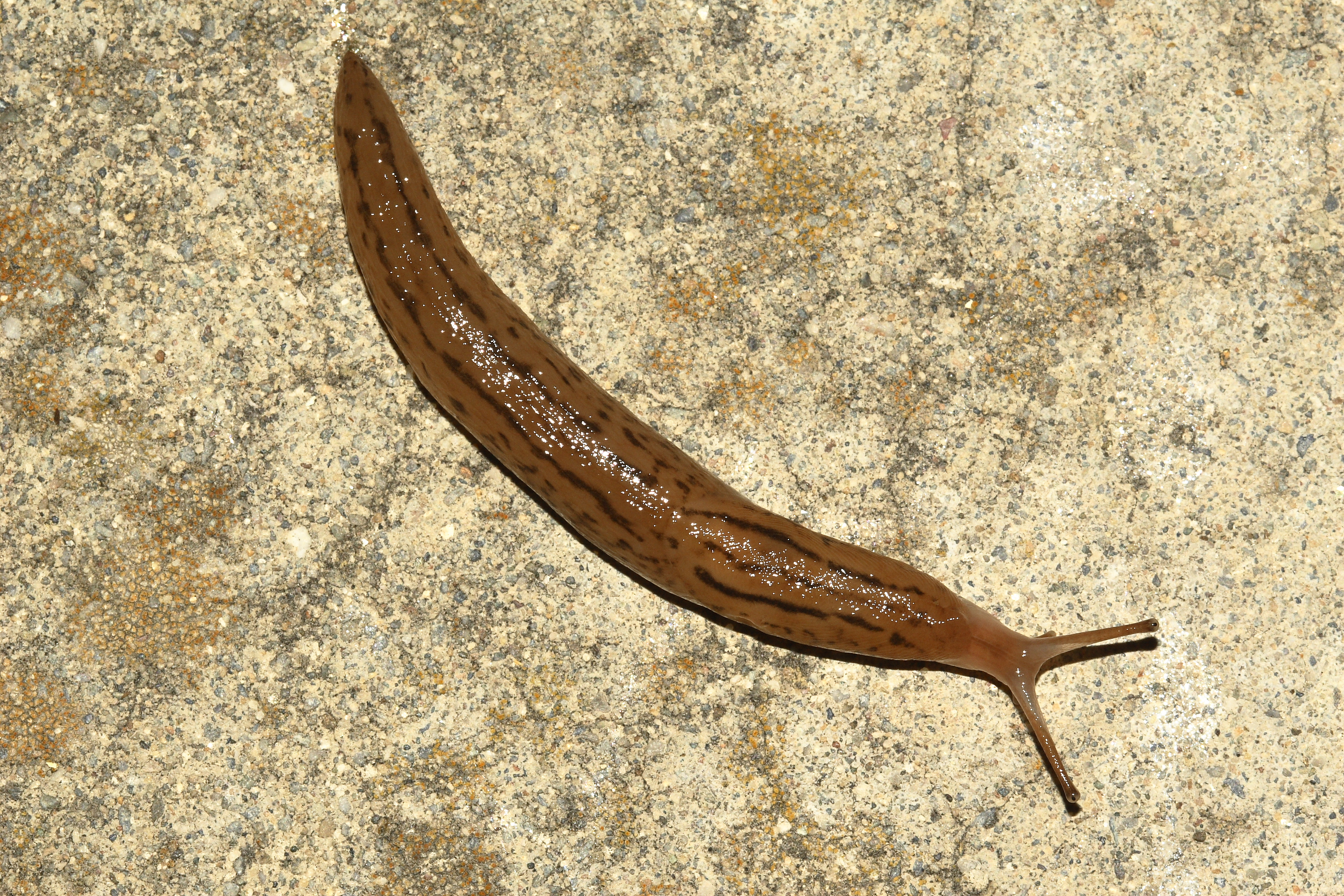
- An active Ambigolimax slug in Fremont, California

Scientific classification
- Kingdom: Animalia
- Phylum: Mollusca
- Class: Gastropoda
- Order: Stylommatophora
- Family: Limacidae
- Genus: Ambigolimax; Pollonera, 1887

Type species
- Ambigolimax valentianus (Férussac, 1822)

Synonyms
- Agriolimax (Ambigolimax) Pollonera, 1887 (original rank)

= Ambigolimax =

Genus of gastropods

Ambigolimax is a genus of air-breathing land slugs in the family Limacidae, the keelback slugs.

There has been disagreement whether Ambigolimax should be considered a subgenus of Lehmannia; the evidence for splitting them is phylogenetic trees constructed on the basis of DNA sequences.

== Species ==
The species in the genus are:

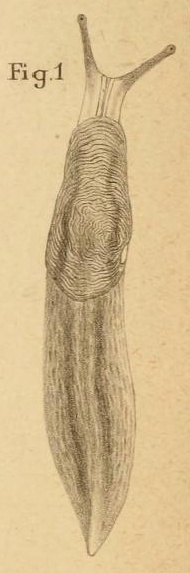
A. valentianus, drawn by Pollonera; from his original subgenus description

- Ambigolimax melitensis (Lessona & Pollonera, 1882)
- Ambigolimax parvipenis Hutchinson, Reise & Schlitt, 2022
- Ambigolimax valentianus (Férussac, 1822) – Valencia slug, threeband garden slug
- Ambigolimax waterstoni Hutchinson, Reise & Schlitt, 2022
- Ambigolimax wiktori (Alonso & Ibáñez, 1989)

These species are not reliably distinguishable on the basis of external characters, so identification requires either dissection to reveal the genitalia or DNA sequencing. Ambigolimax valentianus, A. waterstoni and A. parvipenis are invasive in various parts of the world. All five species are known from North Africa (or in the case of A. wiktori the adjacent island of Tenerife) and it has been proposed that this is their origin.

Previous usage of the name Ambigolimax nyctelius has now been shown to refer to several species that had been confused: A. parvipenis, A. waterstoni, and Lehmannia carpatica. Furthermore, the species name nyctelius actually refers to a species of Letourneuxia (family Arionidae).

== Taxonomic history ==
Ambigolimax was constructed by Pollonera in 1887 to encompass A. valentianus and what he called A. fulvus but is now understood to be Malacolimax tenellus. He considered Ambigolimax as a subgenus of Agriolimax (now Deroceras) in the family Agriolimacidae. In 1926, Hesse transferred it to become a subgenus of Lehmannia in the family Limacidae. Since about 2007 the increasing tendency has been to split Lehmannia s.l. into two genera, Lehmannia s.s. and Ambigolimax. This splitting is based on the now firm genetic evidence that the position of Malacolimax in the phylogenetic tree makes Lehmannia s.l. a paraphyletic group.
