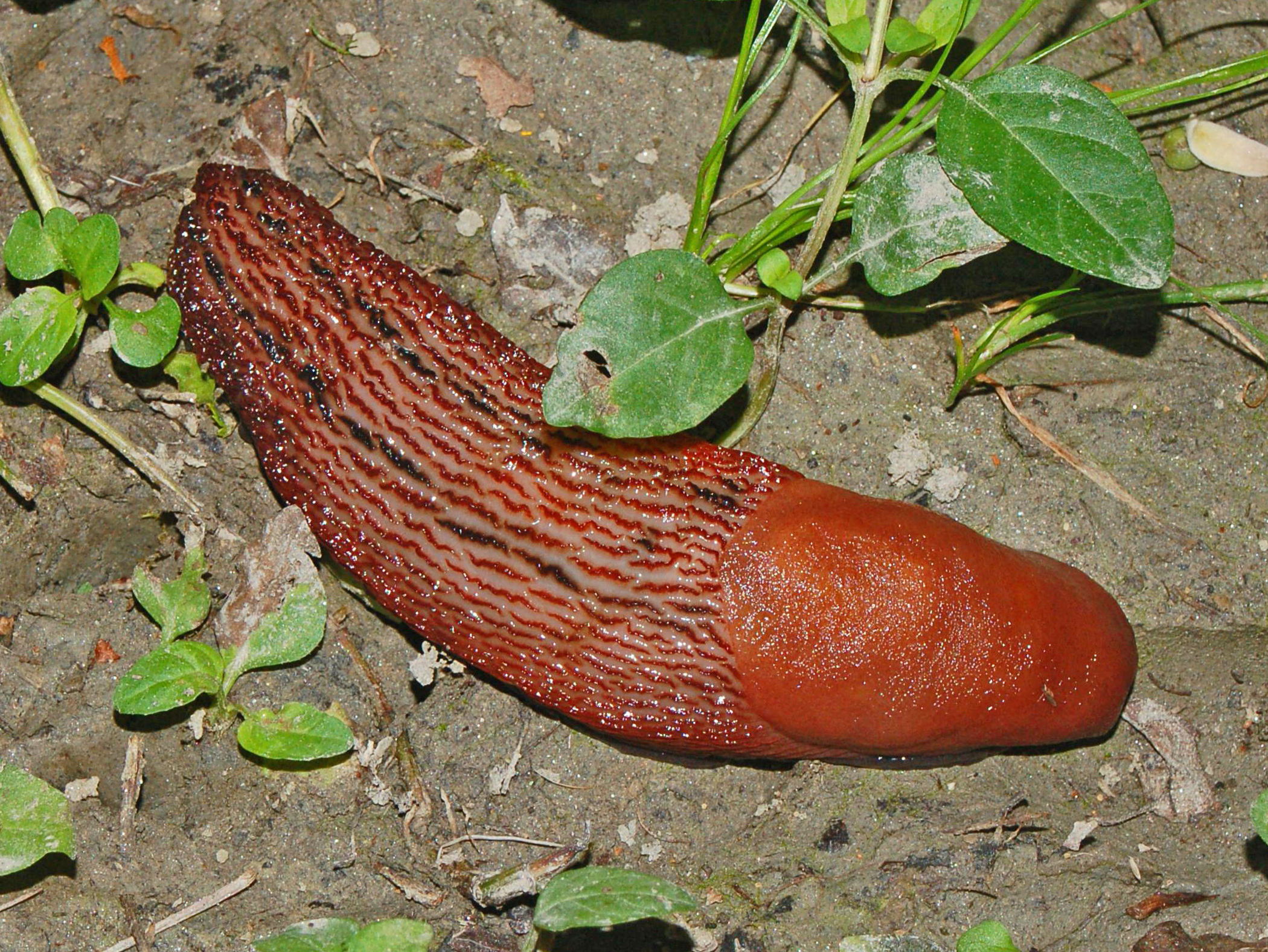
- A live but partially contracted individual of Limax dacampi

Scientific classification
- Kingdom: Animalia
- Phylum: Mollusca
- Class: Gastropoda
- Order: Stylommatophora
- Family: Limacidae
- Subfamily: Limacinae; Batsch, 1789

Diversity
- 11 genera

= Limacinae =

Subfamily of gastropods

Limacinae is a taxonomic subfamily of air-breathing land slugs, terrestrial pulmonate gastropod molluscs in the family Limacidae. The only other subfamily in this family is the Eumilacinae.

== Genera ==
Currently recognised genera in the Limacinae are:

- Ambigolimax Pollonera, 1887; formerly considered a subgenus of Lehmannia
- Bielzia Clessin, 1887 – with the only species Bielzia coerulans M. Bielz, 1851. Some authors, for example Russian malacologists, have classified Bielzia within its own family Bielzidae (= Limacopsidae) or subfamily Bielzinae, but a molecular phylogeny has subsequently placed it within Limacinae.
- Caspilimax P. Hesse, 1926
- Gigantomilax O. Boettger, 1883
- Lehmannia Heynemann, 1863; formerly considered a subgenus of Limax
- Limacus Lehmann, 1864; sometimes considered a subgenus of Limax
- Limax Linnaeus, 1758 – type genus of Limacidae; c. half the recognised species in the family
- Malacolimax Malm, 1868; formerly considered a subgenus of Limax
- Svanetia Hesse, 1926
- Turcomilax Simroth, 1902
- Weltersia Giusti et al. 2021 – with the only species W. obscura Giusti et al. 2021
