= Lehmannia macroflagellata =

Conservation status
- Least Concern (IUCN 3.1)

Scientific classification
- Kingdom: Animalia
- Phylum: Mollusca
- Class: Gastropoda
- Order: Stylommatophora
- Family: Limacidae
- Genus: Lehmannia
- Species: L. macroflagellata

Binomial name
- Lehmannia macroflagellata Grossu et Lupu, 1962

Species of gastropod

Lehmannia macroflagellata is species of air-breathing land slug, a shell-less terrestrial pulmonate gastropod mollusk in the family Limacidae.

== Distribution and habitat ==
This species lives in woodland.

It is listed in the IUCN Red list as a Least Concern species.

It is found in countries and islands including:

- Czech Republic
- Slovakia
- Poland
- Ukraine
- and others
