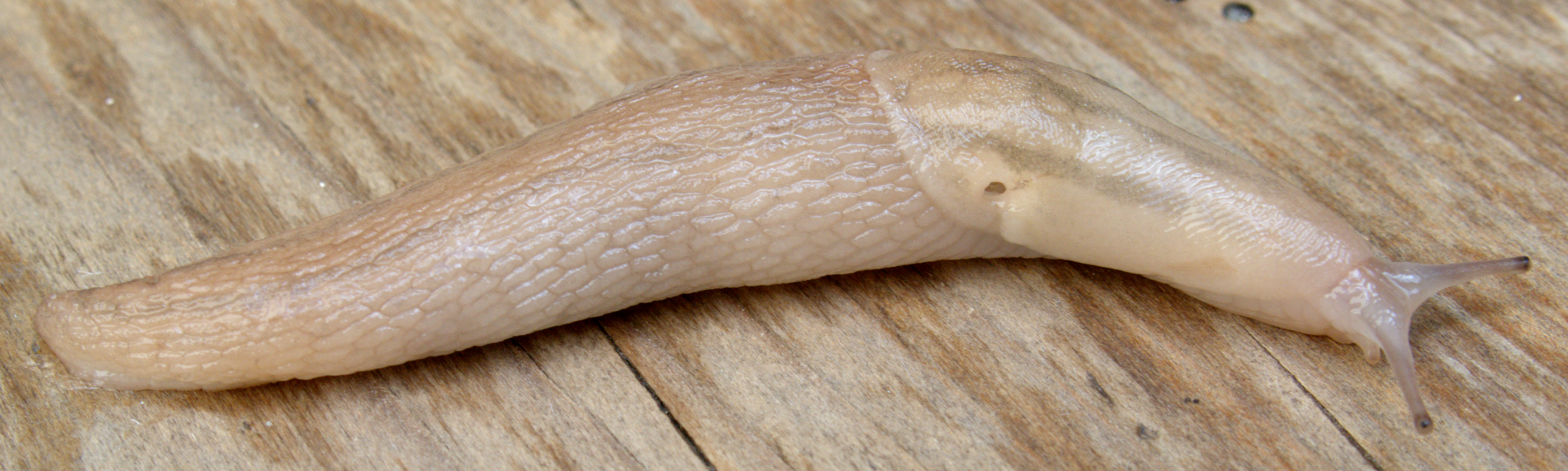

Scientific classification
- Kingdom: Animalia
- Phylum: Mollusca
- Class: Gastropoda
- Order: Stylommatophora
- Family: Limacidae
- Genus: Ambigolimax
- Species: A. waterstoni

Binomial name
- Ambigolimax waterstoni Hutchinson, Reise & Schlitt, 2022

Synonyms
- Lehmannia nyctelia (Bourguignat, 1861); Limax nyctelius Bourguignat, 1861

= Ambigolimax waterstoni =

Species of land slug

Ambigolimax waterstoni is a species of air-breathing land slug, a terrestrial pulmonate gastropod mollusc in the family Limacidae.

== Taxonomy ==
This is one of the several species formerly confused under the name Limax nyctelius and later Lehmannia nyctelia or Ambigolimax nyctelius.

In the early 1930s A.R. Waterston wrote his undergraduate thesis describing a species of "Limax" from the Royal Botanic Garden Edinburgh. These specimens and others were the basis for H.E. Quick in 1946 to name them as Limax nyctelius, a species described from Algeria. By that time M. Connolly had used this name for the same species in South Africa. It was subsequently reported more widely. Only in 2022 was it realised that these further findings were not all of the same species: slugs from the Carpathian Mountains and Bulgaria were of a species now called Lehmannia carpatica and the recently invasive species in Western Europe and California has been renamed Ambigolimax parvipenis. Furthermore, the original Limax nyctelius was recognised as a species of Letourneuxia.

Hence the species from Edinburgh has been renamed Ambigolimax waterstoni, after A.R. Waterston, with the holotype being one of his specimens from the Royal Botanic Garden Edinburgh, still preserved in the National Museum of Scotland.

== Distribution ==
The original home of A. waterstoni is likely Algeria. It is present probably as an introduction on the Mediterranean islands of Elba and Corsica. In South Africa, Australia, and New Zealand it has spread outdoors quite widely. Additional historical occurrences are in botanic gardens in Edinburgh and perhaps Glasgow, and probably on imported palms in Washington DC.

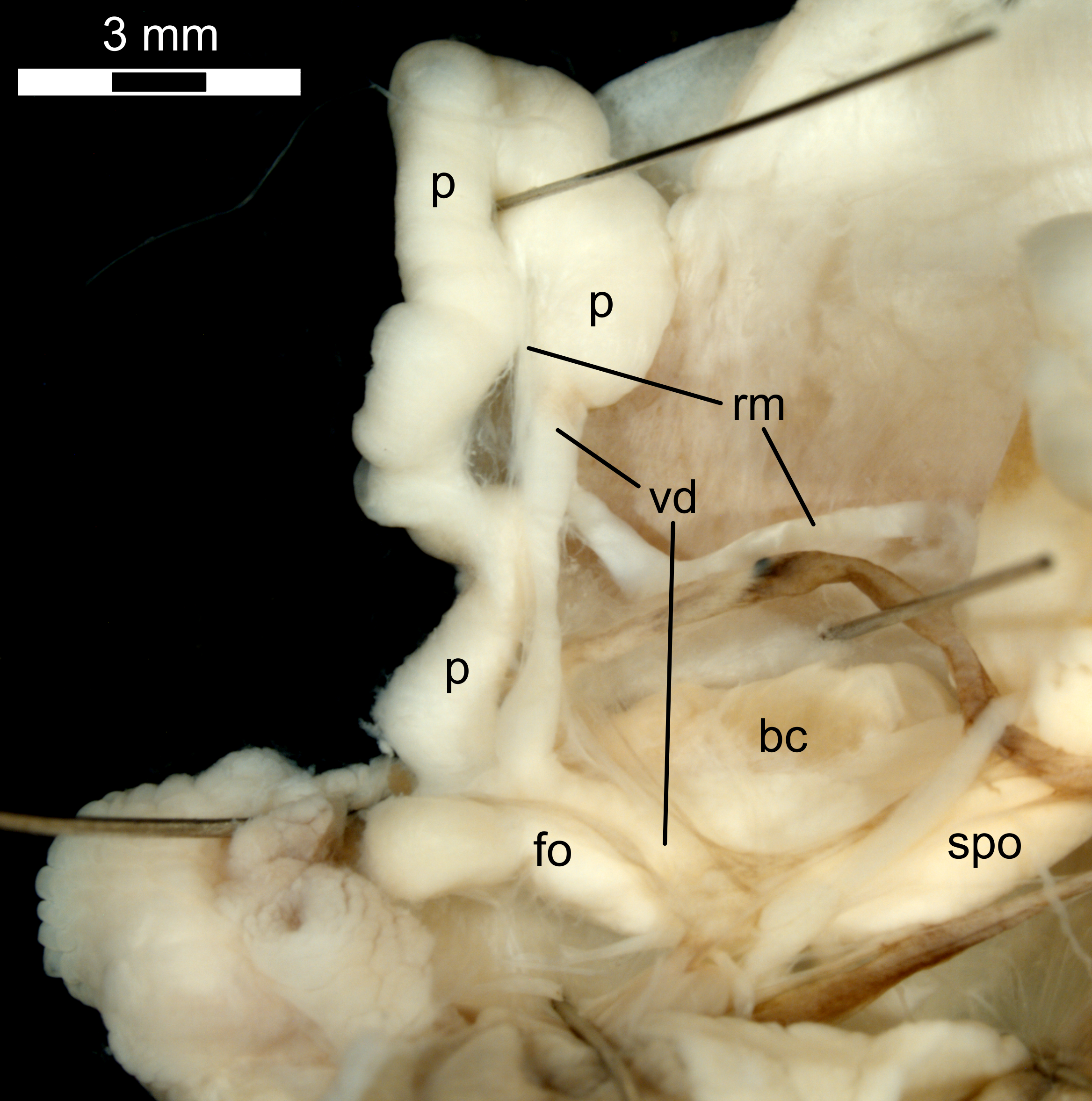
Genitalia: bc = bursa copulatrix, fo = free oviduct, p = penis, rm = penial retractor muscle, spo = sperm-oviduct, vd = vas deferens

== Description ==
The length of preserved specimens reaches 37 mm. Like other limacids, the animals are slim with a pointed tail, and the pneumostome lies in the posterior half of the mantle. The background colour is pale yellowish to light brown, with a pale cream sole. Two darker lines run along either side of the mantle, and also posteriorly along the back, although fainter and perhaps not in all specimens. On these external features A. waterstoni is generally not distinguishable externally from other species of Ambigolimax, so morphological identification requires dissection.

The species is readily identifiable by its penis, which is long and lacks a penial appendage. These characters are shared by Lehmannia carpatica, but the structures inside the retracted penis are distinct: Ambigolimax waterstoni has two flaps running most of the length of the penis with a distinctive honeycomb-like surface structure on the tissue between the flaps.
