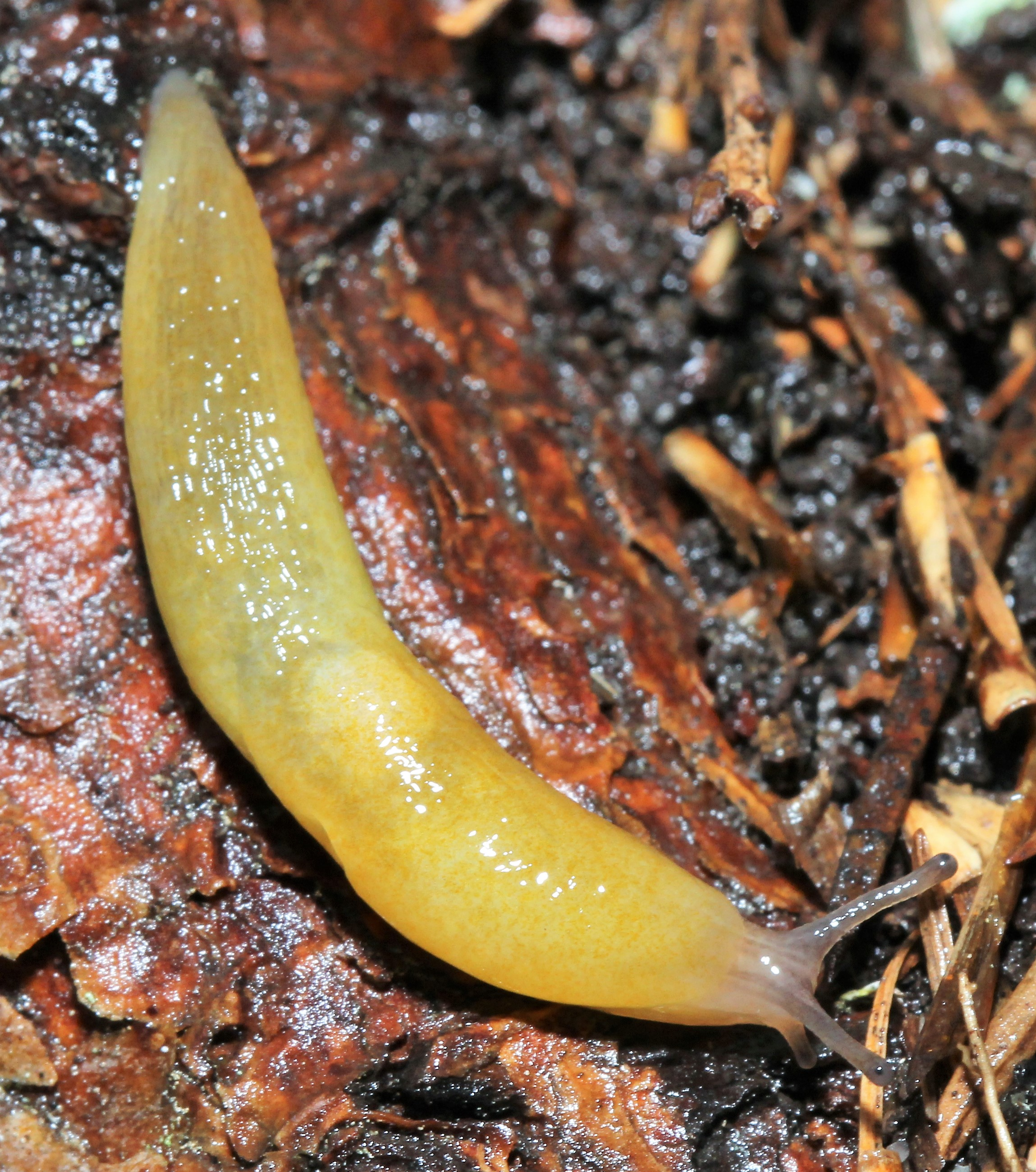

Conservation status
- Least Concern (IUCN 3.1)

Scientific classification
- Kingdom: Animalia
- Phylum: Mollusca
- Class: Gastropoda
- Order: Stylommatophora
- Family: Limacidae
- Genus: Malacolimax
- Species: M. tenellus

Binomial name
- Malacolimax tenellus (O.F. Müller, 1774)

Synonyms
- Limax tenellus O.F. Müller, 1774, Limax fulvus Normand, 1852

= Malacolimax tenellus =

Species of air-breathing land slug

Malacolimax tenellus (lemon slug) is a European species of air-breathing land slug, a terrestrial gastropod mollusc in the family Limacidae.

== Description ==
The body is yellow in color, from pale to bright yellow, sometimes with a hint of orange, and the sole is pale yellow, and produces yellow slime. The head is gray or lilac and the tentacles are typically tinged with purple or are a blue-grey. It can grow up to 50 mm (2 in).

== Distribution ==
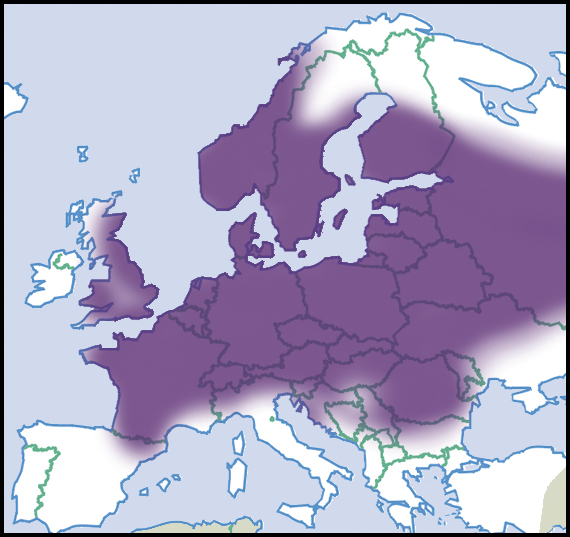

This species is European, with a range extending from the Pyrenees to European Russia and northwards into Scandinavia. But it is absent from Ireland and most of southern Europe.

== Ecology ==
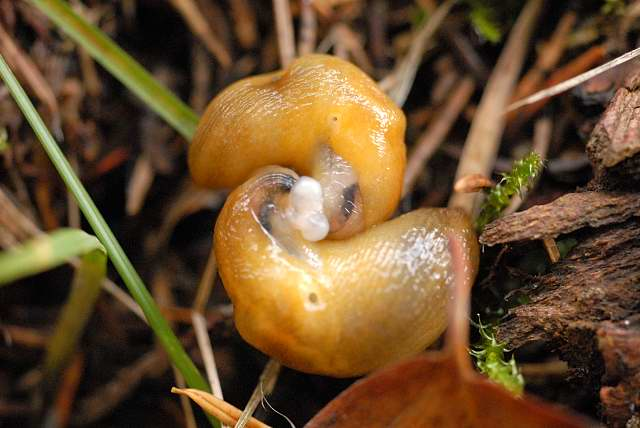
Mating of M. tenellus

This species lives in both deciduous and coniferous woodland. It typically feeds at night on fungi.

Parasites of Malacolimax tenellus include:

- Elaphostrongylus spp.
