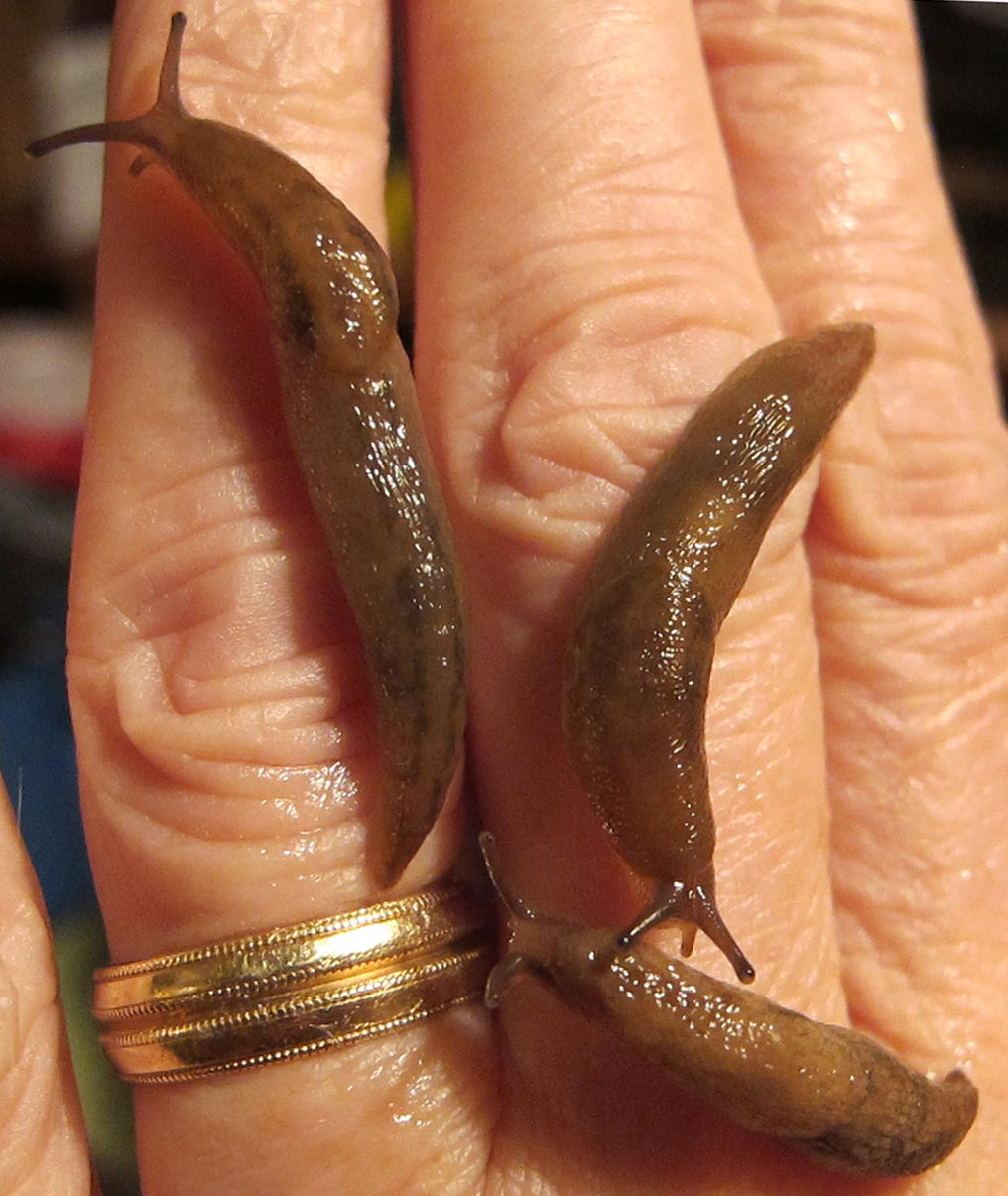

Conservation status
- Least Concern (IUCN 3.1)

- Secure (NatureServe)

Scientific classification
- Kingdom: Animalia
- Phylum: Mollusca
- Class: Gastropoda
- Order: Stylommatophora
- Superfamily: Limacoidea
- Family: Limacidae
- Genus: Ambigolimax
- Species: A. valentianus

Binomial name
- Ambigolimax valentianus (A. Férussac, 1822)

Synonyms
- Limax valentianus Férussac, 1822 superseded combination; Lehmannia valentiana (Férussac, 1822) superseded combination; Limax poireri Mabille, 1883 junior subjective synonym; Lehmannia poirieri (Mabille, 1883); Lehmannia getica Grossu, 1970 junior subjective synonym

= Ambigolimax valentianus =

Species of terrestrial slug

Ambigolimax valentianus (formerly known as Lehmannia valentiana) is a species of terrestrial slug, a pulmonate gastropod mollusc in the family Limacidae.

It has spread very widely around the world, especially in greenhouses, where it can be a pest; in warmer climates it has often then spread outdoors. Comparatively much has been learnt about its life cycle and temperature relations. Dissection is necessary to reliably distinguish it from congeners in regions where these co-occur.

== Taxonomy ==
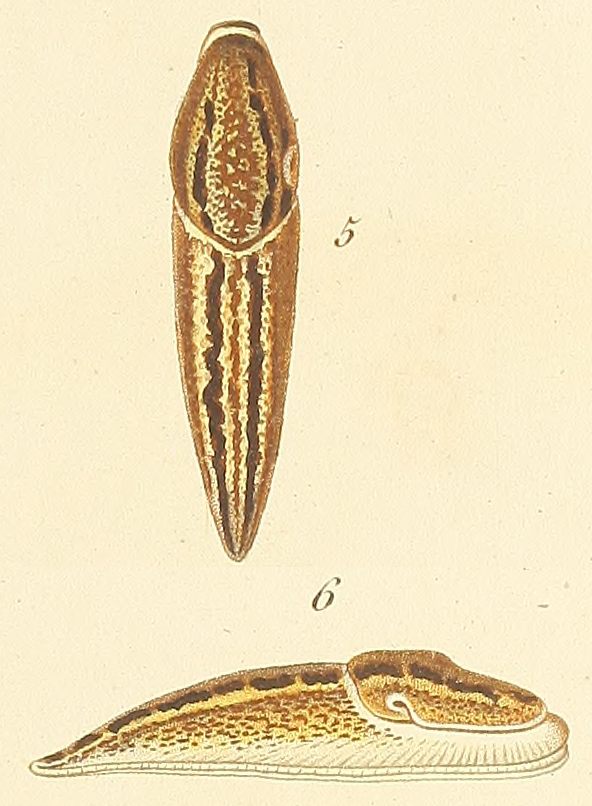
Illustration from the original description

The species was described by Férussac under the name Limax valentianus from alcohol-preserved specimens collected from gardens in Valencia (hence the species name). There has been disagreement about the publication date of this description, with Vendetti et al. claiming 1821. However, Bank et al. have subsequently argued that only an unlabelled illustration appeared in 1821, and that the plate's legend and the species description were published in issues of the same work appearing only in 1822. Thus the publication date should be 1822.

Two specimens from Férussac's collection in the Muséum national d'Histoire naturelle in Paris may well be the type specimens, but this cannot be proved.

The species had been moved from Limax to the genus Lehmannia (changing gender to L. valentiana). The current placement in Ambigolimax is supported by molecular-based phylogenies. Its placement in Milax (e.g.) was a temporary aberration of Brazilian researchers.

== Description ==
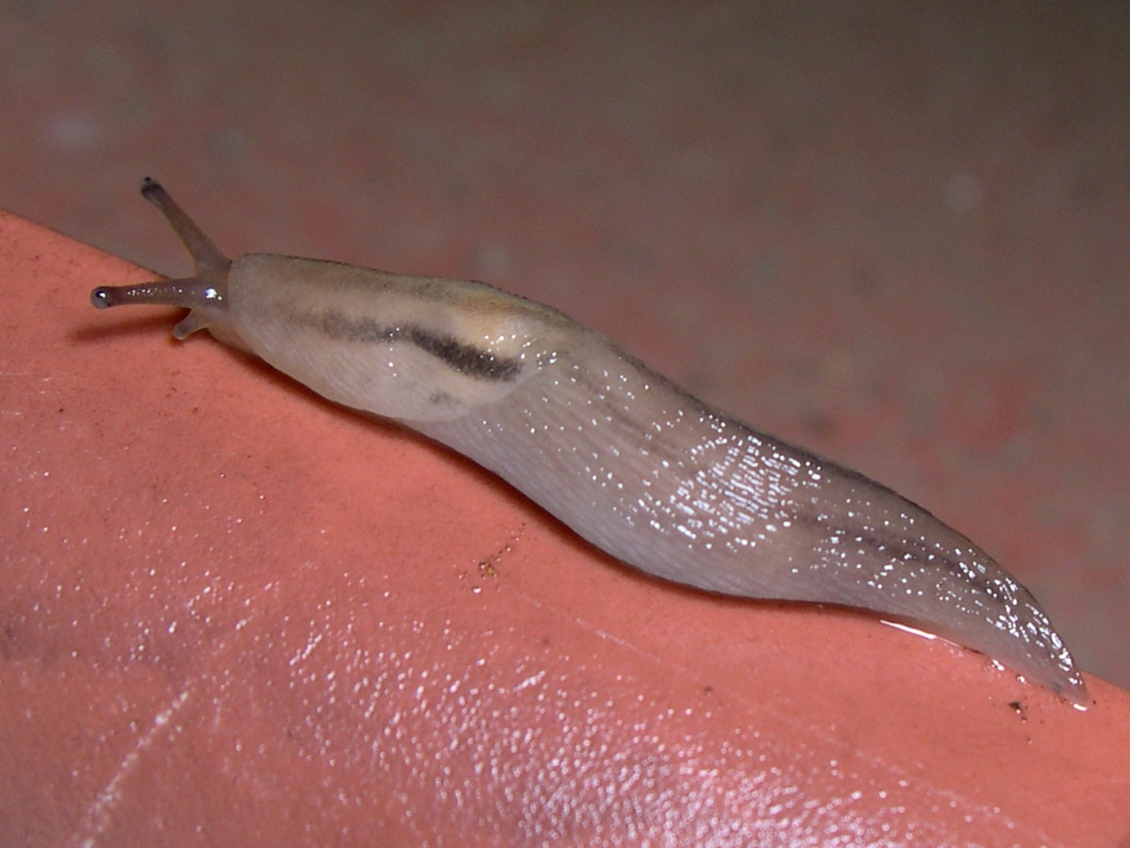
Pale individual from Japan

Genitalia. Note the sausage-shaped penial appendage

External appearance does not reliably distinguish A. valentianus from other members of the genus, such as A. parvipenis, with which it may co-occur. Like other members of the Limacidae, it has a pointed tail and the pneumostome lies in the posterior half of the mantle. Often the most obvious character of an Ambigolimax slug is the two parallel, sharply defined, dark lines along the mantle, sometimes with a thicker less well defined line lying between. Two similar lines may lie more posteriorly along the back either side of the midline, but all these lines may be faint or even absent in some individuals. Others have further dots and mottled patches of darker pigment. The dorsal coloration is most often pinkish brown, but sometimes dull yellowish or grey, and all shades in between. Older individuals tend to be yellower with less prominent lines but more prominent mottling. The mucus is colourless, transparent, and watery. Maximum length is about 8 cm.

Ambigolimax valentianus is identifiable from the internal genitalia, which require dissection to examine. In particular it has a substantial sausage-shaped penial appendage at the inner end of the penis; rarely the appendage is swollen towards its tip. Sometimes the appendage appears absent because it is inverted into the lumen of the penis. This might cause confusion with A. parvipenis but the penis of A. valentianus without the appendage is about as long as the bursa copulatrix and its duct, whereas it is only about half the length in A. parvipenis.

== Life cycle and ecology ==
In captivity, at about 17 °C, eggs took roughly 3 weeks to hatch, and hatchlings took about 24 weeks to first lay eggs. These slugs laid of the order of 150 eggs in their lifetimes, but one individual laid 1510 eggs. Eggs were laid in clutches, ranging widely in size but 40 eggs was typical. About half of slugs kept singly had died within 15 months, but some lived for over two years. At 5 °C eggs took much longer to hatch (17 weeks); above 25 °C all eggs died, although a small proportion survived briefer (1 hour) exposures to 31 °C. Hatchlings mostly survived 34 °C, but not 36 °C. However, resistance to heat varies adaptively through the year, as does resistance to cold; in the middle of winter half the individuals could survive −8 °C, whereas for hatchlings in March the equivalent figure was −3 °C. Increased cold tolerance can be induced by shorter days.

In subtropical parts of Japan, A. valentianus has an annual life cycle and reproduces during the colder part of the year; egg laying occurs between November and May but is depressed in the coldest months. Sperm is first produced a little earlier during development than eggs. Most eggs hatch in April. In spring two generations of the slug coexist, overlapping in size, before the older generation dies off by June. In more temperate parts of Japan, the life cycle is similar, but shifted two months earlier, so that slugs mature already by August or September and die by May. In both populations the trigger for maturation is day length.

Slugs kept singly without the opportunity to mate nevertheless produced as many fertile eggs as those kept in groups. However, population genetic data implies that free-living individuals largely cross with others.

Ambigolimax valentianus eats green leaves and shoots, and consequently can be a pest in greenhouses or even outdoors. It also eats lichens, animal matter and fallen leaves. Activity and feeding start before sunset, peaking in the earlier part of the night. This species seldom climbs up trees and during the day is most commonly found under boards, rocks and plant containers. Often its first discovery in a country has been in greenhouses, from whence it has spread to gardens, other synanthropic habitats outdoors, and even to woodland, likely facilitated nowadays by global warming. Where it has been introduced, this species may become the dominant slug. A bizarre consequence of its abundance on Gough Island is that it prevented the eradication of another introduction, the house mouse, by consuming the poison bait dropped from helicopters.

== Distribution ==
It has often been stated that A. valentianus is native to Spain, but this belief is based only on where it was first recorded. The limited genetic variation in the Iberian Peninsula argues against this hypothesis, and an origin in North Africa has been proposed instead.

Ambigolimax valentianus has been recorded widely around the world, with its spread started already in the nineteenth century. In the following list, oceanic islands are considered separately from the mainland countries to which they belong. If the date of first collection is not given in the cited source, the publication date of the first report is listed instead.

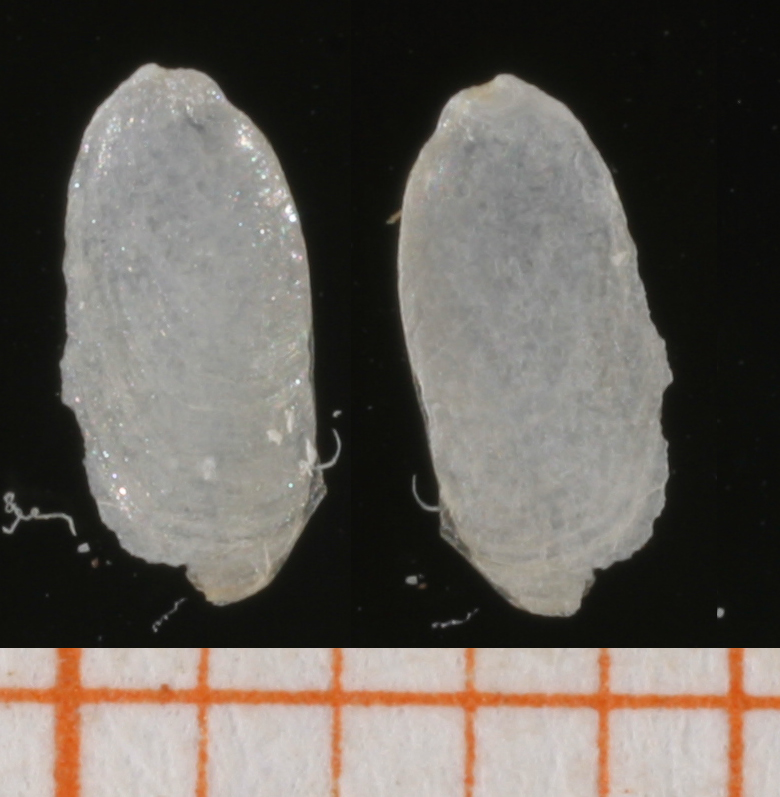
Two views of an internal shell of A. valentianus

Europe

- Spain: since 1821
- Portugal: since 1891
- Andorra: since 2000
- France: since 1954
- Great Britain: since 1936 (greenhouses), 1985–1986 (outdoors)
- Island of Ireland: since 1932 (botanic garden), 1981 (outdoors)
- Belgium: since 1946 (greenhouse), 1973 (outdoors)
- The Netherlands: since 1962
- Germany: since 1948 (greenhouse)
- Denmark: since 1959
- Sweden: since 1921 (greenhouses)
- Norway: since 1967 (greenhouses)
- Finland: since 1960s (greenhouses)
- Latvia: since 2009 (botanical garden)
- Lithuania: since 2010 (indoor garden)
- Poland: since 1963
- Switzerland: isolated report from 1918
- Italy: since 1979 (outdoors)
- Malta: since 1986
- Czech Republic: since 1960 (greenhouses)
- Slovakia: since 2020 (outdoors)
- Austria: since 1980 (botanical garden)
- Hungary: since 1964 (botanical garden)
- Croatia: since 2015 (outdoors)
- Serbia: since 2010 (indoor garden), 2025 (outdoors)
- Bulgaria: since 2023 (outdoors)
- Greece: since 2007
- Romania: since 1962 (greenhouses)
- European Russia: since 1980

Africa

- Algeria: already in 19th century
- Morocco: since 1985
- Libya: since 2018–2019
- Egypt: since 2010 (nursery)
- South Africa: since 1961

Asia

- Turkey: since 2009
- Israel: since 1979, by 2015 the commonest garden slug
- Uzbekistan: since 1980
- Kazakhstan: since 1996
- Iran: since 2004
- Japan: since late 1950s
- China: since 1978
- Singapore: since 2020 (in cooled glasshouses)
- South Korea: since 2025

Australasia

- Australia: since 1911
- New Zealand: since 1979
- Papua New Guinea: since 2018

Americas

- USA: since 1917 (greenhouses); already by 1961 known from California, Colorado, Missouri, Arizona, Oklahoma, New York State, Michigan, Ohio, New Jersey, Massachusetts, Pennsylvania, Kansas, Maryland
- Canada: since 1972 (greenhouses, Manitoba), 2000 (outdoors, British Columbia)
- Dominican Republic: since 2012
- Mexico: since 2017
- Colombia: since 1963
- Venezuela: since 1982
- Brazil: since 1976
- Peru: since 2003
- Argentina: since 1924
- Chile: since 1893

Oceanic Islands

- Canary Islands (Spain): since 1878
- Azores (Portugal): since 1957
- Madeira (Portugal): since 1978
- Tristan da Cunha (UK): since 1982
- Gough Island (UK): since 2000
- Hawaii (USA): since 1982
- Juan Fernandez Islands (Chile): since 1908
- Easter Island (Chile): since 1917
- Ulleung Island (South Korea): since 2018 (identification only as Ambigolimax sp.)
- [Galapagos (Ecuador): not established but intercepted many times since 2014, hitchhiking on planes]

== Further studies ==
Ambigolimax valentianus has been used as a model species for studying the neuromechanisms of learning and memory, particularly by researchers in Japan. It has been shown to have a circadian clock, entrained by light but not temperature. Its mucus has been analysed chemically to understand why slug mucus is sticky. Various studies have examined the bacteria and helminth parasites associated with the species. It has been used to assess the unpalatability of fungi.
