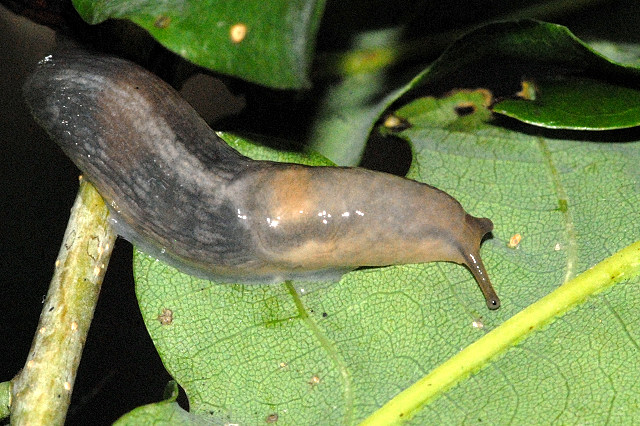
- Lehmannia marginata

Conservation status
- Secure (NatureServe)

Scientific classification
- Kingdom: Animalia
- Phylum: Mollusca
- Class: Gastropoda
- Order: Stylommatophora
- Family: Limacidae
- Genus: Lehmannia
- Species: L. marginata

Binomial name
- Lehmannia marginata (O. F. Müller, 1774)

Synonyms
- Limax marginatus O. F. Müller, 1774

= Lehmannia marginata =

Species of gastropod

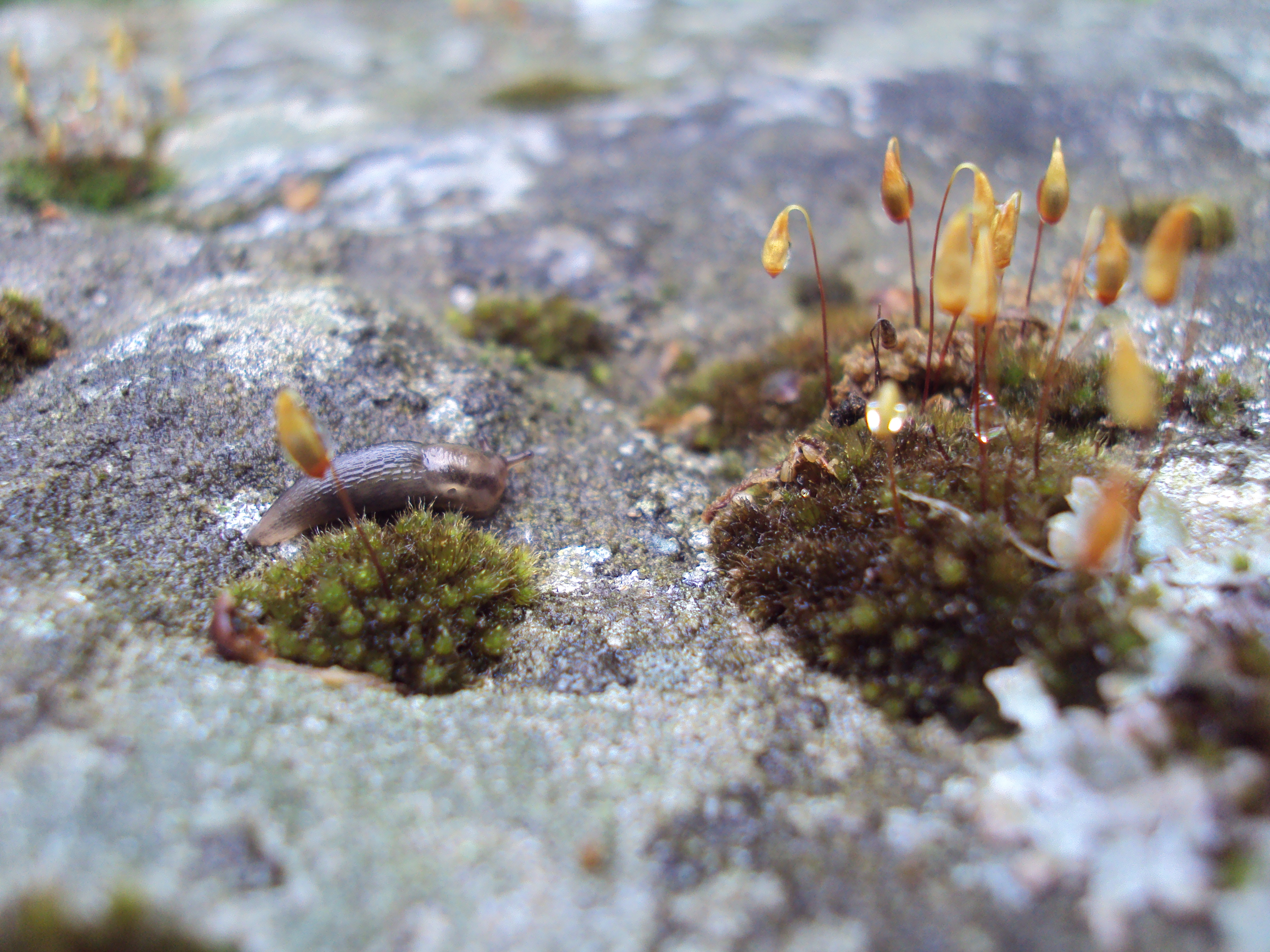
A small Lehmannia marginata browsing on lichen amid moss patches

Lehmannia marginata is a species of air-breathing land slug, a terrestrial pulmonate gastropod mollusk in the family Limacidae. Sometimes classified in the genus Limax, the species is distinct in its ecology, and its nearly transparent body. It is a medium-sized species, rarely exceeding 12 cm in body length. The body is fairly long and narrow, with a marked keel. The keel looks lighter than the remaining body against the darker innards.

== Distribution ==
This species is known to occur in a number of countries and islands including:

- Czech Republic
- Netherlands
- Slovakia
- Poland
- Ukraine
- Great Britain
- Ireland
- Norway
- Spain

== Description ==
This is a species of keeled slug.

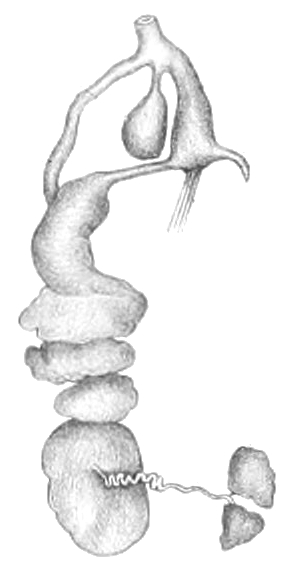
Drawing of reproductive system of Lehmannia marginata

== Ecology ==
This slug species is found in woodland.

Lehmannia marginata eats lichen, algae and mushrooms, and will only eat other dead slugs if no other food is available.
