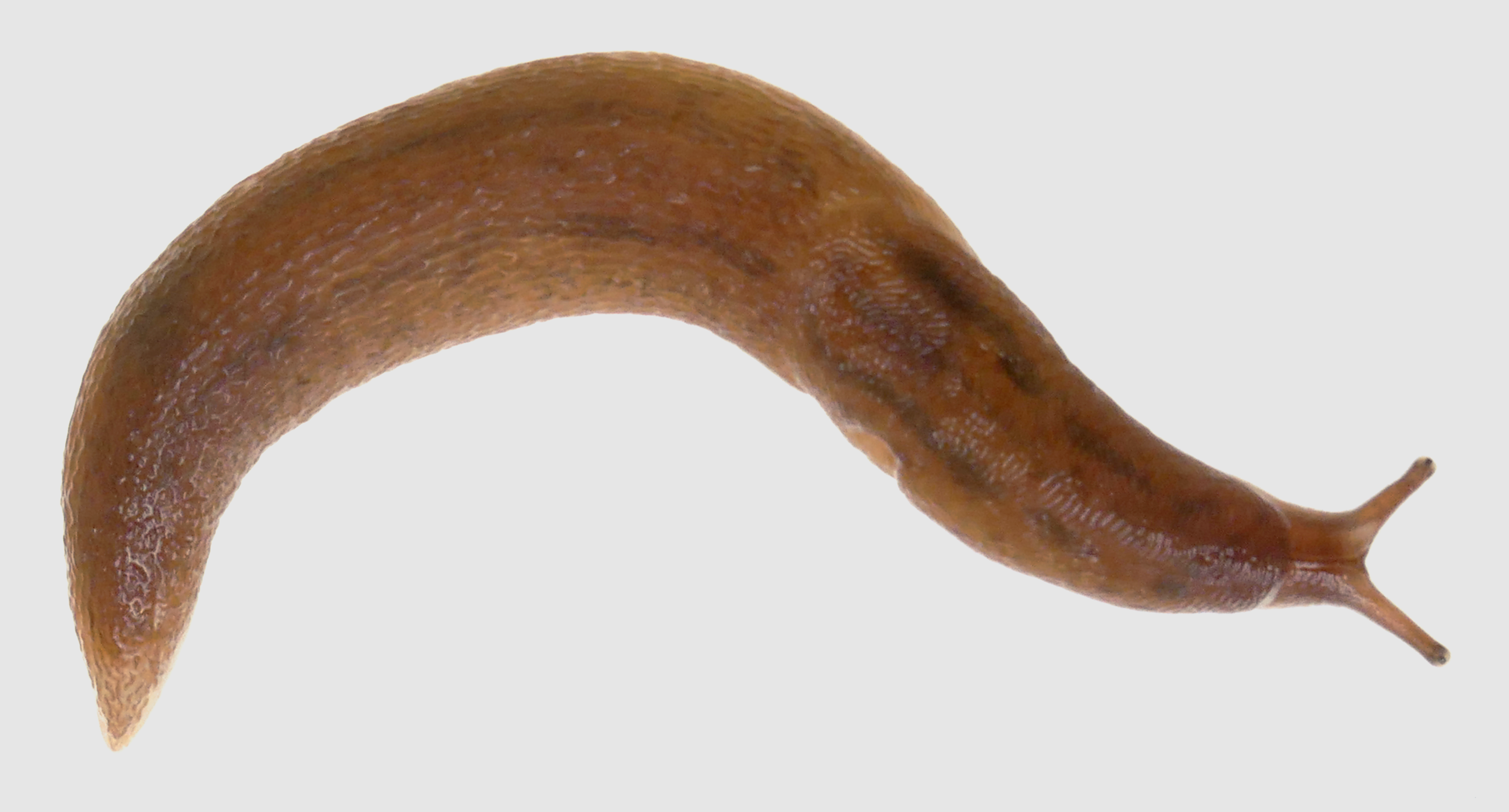

Scientific classification
- Kingdom: Animalia
- Phylum: Mollusca
- Class: Gastropoda
- Order: Stylommatophora
- Superfamily: Limacoidea
- Family: Limacidae
- Genus: Ambigolimax
- Species: A. parvipenis

Binomial name
- Ambigolimax parvipenis Hutchinson, Reise & Schlitt, 2022

= Ambigolimax parvipenis =

Species of land slug

Ambigolimax parvipenis is a species of air-breathing land slug, a terrestrial pulmonate gastropod mollusc in the Limacidae.

== Taxonomy ==
Ambigolimax parvipenis was first clearly characterised in 2014, based on specimens from the British Isles. This work showed it to be distinct from the externally similar Ambigolimax valentianus on the basis both of genital anatomy and of the genetic sequences in the barcoding COI mitochondrial gene. The species later named Ambigolimax parvipenis was at that time referred to as Ambigolimax nyctelius (Bourguignat, 1861) because of some similarity in genital anatomy with a slug species from the Royal Botanic Garden Edinburgh that had been named Limax nyctelius or Lehmannia nyctelia (since renamed Ambigolimax waterstoni). These two slug species both lack a penial appendage but differ considerably in the length of the penis. In 2022 it was shown that they are indeed different species, that they had both been confused with an Eastern European species (Lehmannia carpatica), and furthermore that the slug originally named Limax nyctelius was yet another species.

Accordingly it was necessary to coin the new name Ambigolimax parvipenis. The etymology of the name is the genitive of "parvus penis", the Latin for "small penis". The type locality is Almondbury churchyard, West Yorkshire, England.

== Occurrence and distribution ==
The native distribution is unknown, but proposed to be North Africa. Indeed in Algeria the species is widespread in natural as well as ruderal habitats. However, the first definite records were from several sites in Cornwall and Devon (SW England) in 1999–2000; a 1987 record from Suffolk might also be this species. Since then it has spread widely in Britain and Ireland and by the end of 2021 was reported from 25 vice-counties in Britain and 3 in Ireland. It is known also from France, Hungary, Slovakia, Serbia, Greece, and Spain, including the Canary Islands and Chafarinas Islands. It is widespread in California (earliest record = 2005), with one record from Arizona.

In Europe, the species is typically found in gardens and similar disturbed habitats. It is often under stones and plant debris.

Historical (pre-2022) records of Limax nyctelius, Lehmannia nyctelia or Ambigolimax nyctelius from South Africa, Australia, New Zealand, Edinburgh and Elba are now known to be of A. waterstoni, and those from the Carpathian Mountains south to Bulgaria are of Lehmannia carpatica.

== Description ==
Genitalia. Note the short penis without appendage.

Adult slugs are up to 80 mm long when crawling but often mature at a much smaller size. Like other limacids, they are slim with a pointed tail, and the pneumostome lies in the posterior half of the mantle. The mucus is transparent and colourless. The background colour is yellowish-grey to various shades of brown, with the flanks paler and the sole pale cream. Usually there are at least traces of a pair of dark lines running either side of the midline of the back, and another pair of dark lines on either side of the mantle. Often there are additional such longitudinal lines and spotting. None of these external characters reliably distinguish the species from Ambigolimax valentianus (which often co-occurs with A. parvipenis) or other species of Ambigolimax.

The penis is distinctive by its small size (roughly half the length of the bursa copulatrix and duct) and lack of a penial appendage (although vestigial knobs are occasionally present). However, the penial appendage of A. valentianus may sometimes be inverted inside the penis, so slitting open the penis is necessary to confirm its absence.
