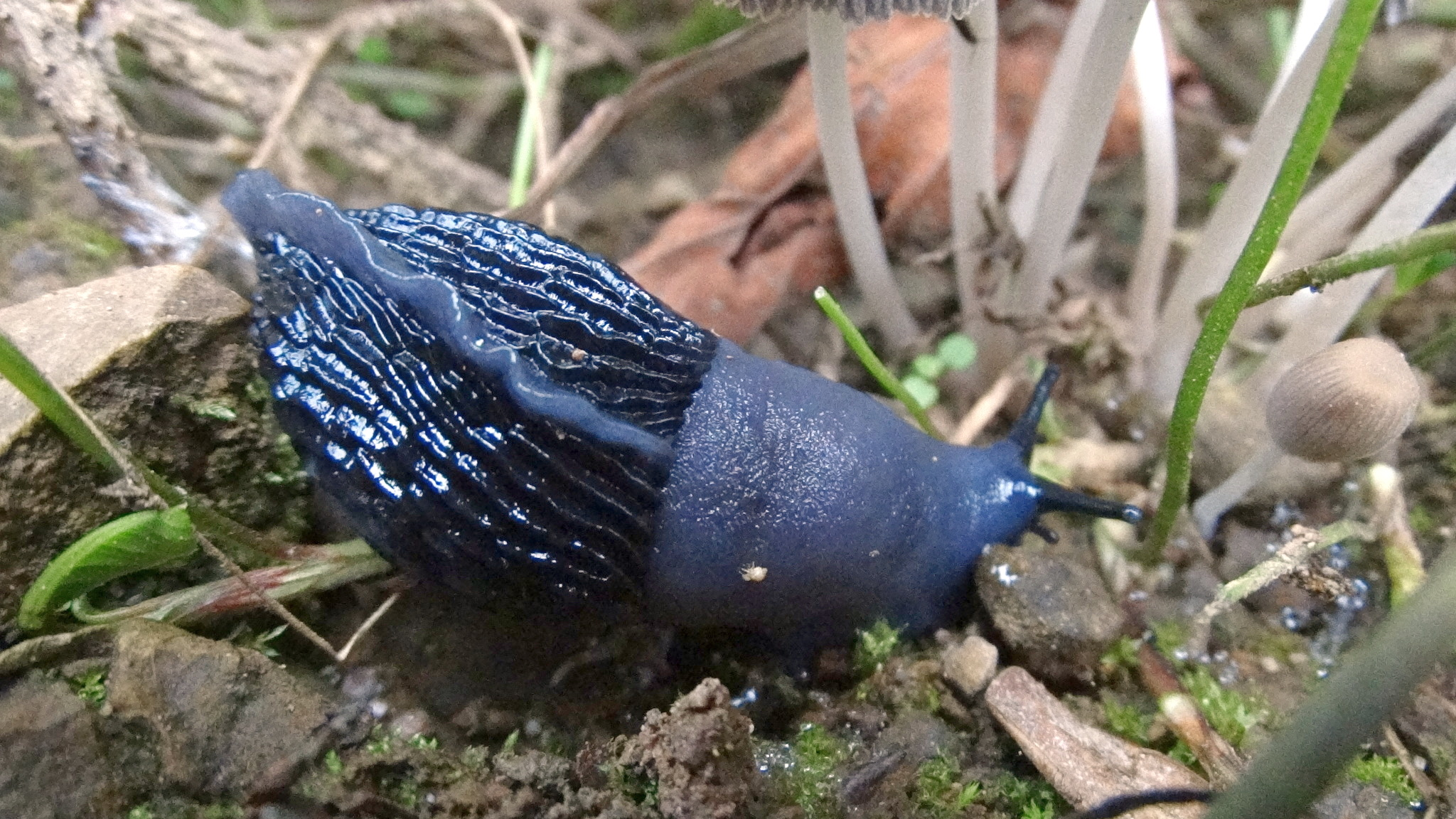
- Gigantomilax lederi

Scientific classification
- Kingdom: Animalia
- Phylum: Mollusca
- Class: Gastropoda
- Order: Stylommatophora
- Family: Limacidae
- Genus: Gigantomilax; Boettger, 1883

= Gigantomilax =

Genus of slugs

Gigantomilax is a genus of gastropods belonging to the family Limacidae.

The species of this genus are found in Mediterranean and Western Asia.

Species:

- Gigantomilax benjaminus Borredà & Martínez-Ortí, 2008
- Gigantomilax borschomensis Simroth, 1912
- Gigantomilax brunneus (Simroth, 1902)
- Gigantomilax cecconii (Simroth, 1906)
- Gigantomilax daghestanus (Simroth, 1898)
- Gigantomilax koenigi (Simroth, 1912)
- Gigantomilax lederi (O.Boettger, 1883)
- Gigantomilax lenkoranus Simroth, 1912
- Gigantomilax majoricensis (Heynemann, 1863)
- Gigantomilax monticola (O.Boettger, 1881)
- Gigantomilax occidentalis P.Hesse, 1928
