= Andrzej Wiktor =

Slug taxonomist

Andrzej Hubert Wiktor
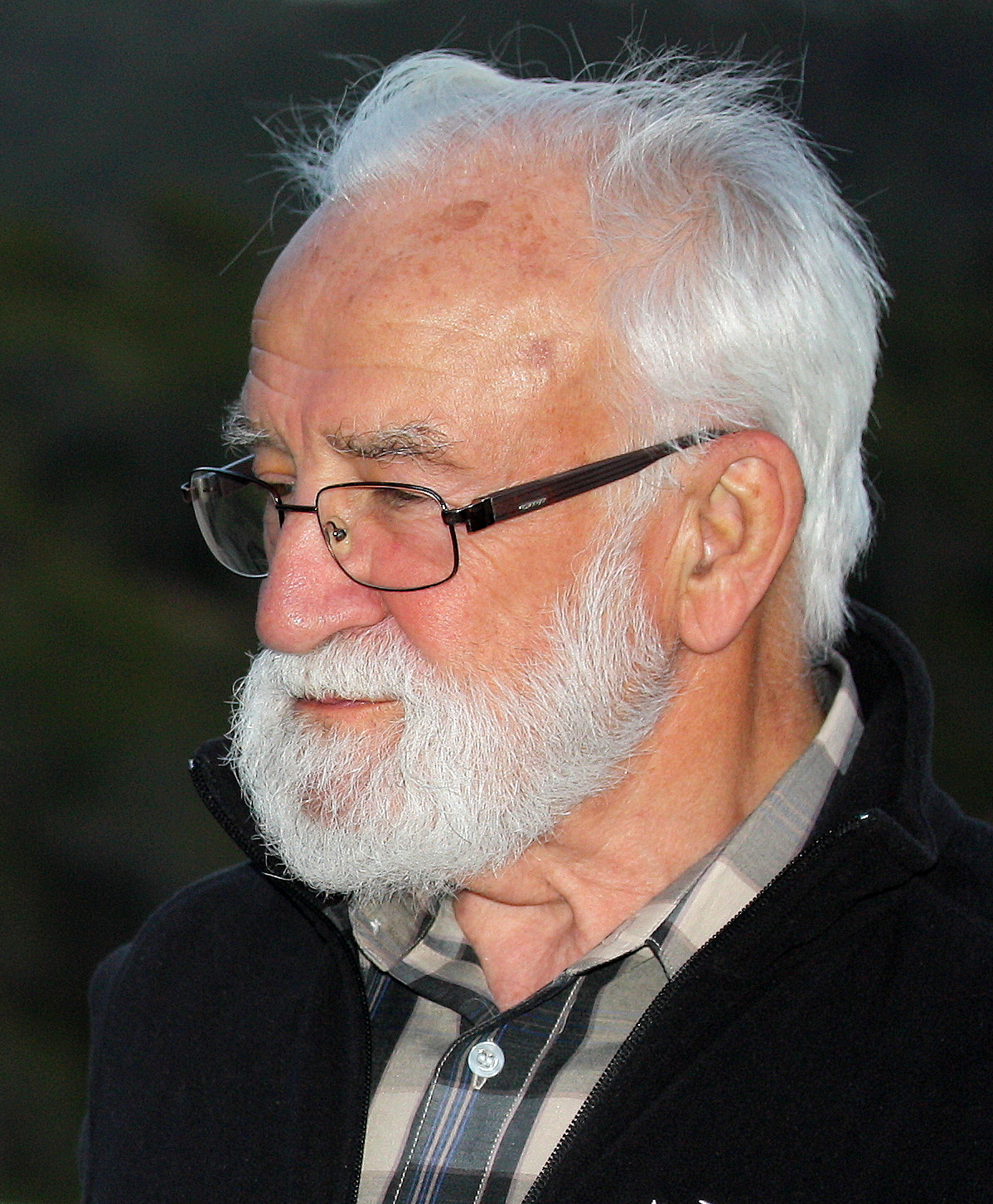
- Born: February 4, 1931; Nowa Wieś, near Rzeszów, Poland
- Died: December 31, 2018 (aged 87)
- Resting place: Cemetery of Świętej Rodziny in Wrocław; 51.10973°N 17.11075°E
- Education: Poznań University, University of Wrocław
- Known for: Taxonomy and morphology of terrestrial slugs
- Spouses: Jadwiga Kwiecińska, Hanna Mizgajska
- Children: 1
- Scientific career
- Fields: Malacology
- Workplaces: Museum of Natural History, University of Wrocław
- Academic advisors: Jan Rafalski, Jarosław Urbański

Andrzej Wiktor (1931–2018) was a Polish taxonomist of terrestrial slugs. His considerable research output includes a number of comprehensive reviews that document the slug faunas of particular countries or revise the taxonomy of whole families. He worked for almost all of his career at the Museum of Natural History, University of Wrocław in Poland.

== Career ==
Andrzej Hubert Wiktor was born 4 February 1931 in Nowa Wieś, near Rzeszów, in south-east Poland. He studied biology at Poznań University and then at the University of Wrocław. After completing his doctorate in 1962 while employed at the Wrocław Medical University, the rest of his career was based at the Museum of Natural History, University of Wrocław, of which he became Director in 1980. He also held various other prestigious posts in the university and in other academic organisations (e.g. President of the Polish Zoological Society, Corresponding Member of the Polish Academy of Arts and Sciences; full list at), and only his known opposition to the communist party prevented his appointment as university Rector. He continued his research past his formal retirement in 2002, with his final paper appearing in 2017. He died on the last day of 2018.

Most of Wiktor's scientific output concerned terrestrial slugs, particularly their taxonomy and morphology, with some articles encompassing also terrestrial snails. His 108 publications (bibliography at supplemented in but overlooked) include books and long monographs dealing comprehensively with the slug fauna of particular countries or revising the taxonomy of entire families. One of his later works was a guidebook to the terrestrial mollusc fauna of Poland. He described about 60 new species (listed in), but equally valuable is his work synonymising species, usually based on inspecting type specimens in museums. Most articles were written in English or German, with a few in Polish or Russian, and are illustrated by his own drawings. He was a keen traveller and collector of slugs, mostly in Europe but even as far afield as China and Papua New Guinea, so that Wrocław now has a uniquely rich collection. His obituaries emphasise his kindness and generosity to young scientists.

== Family ==
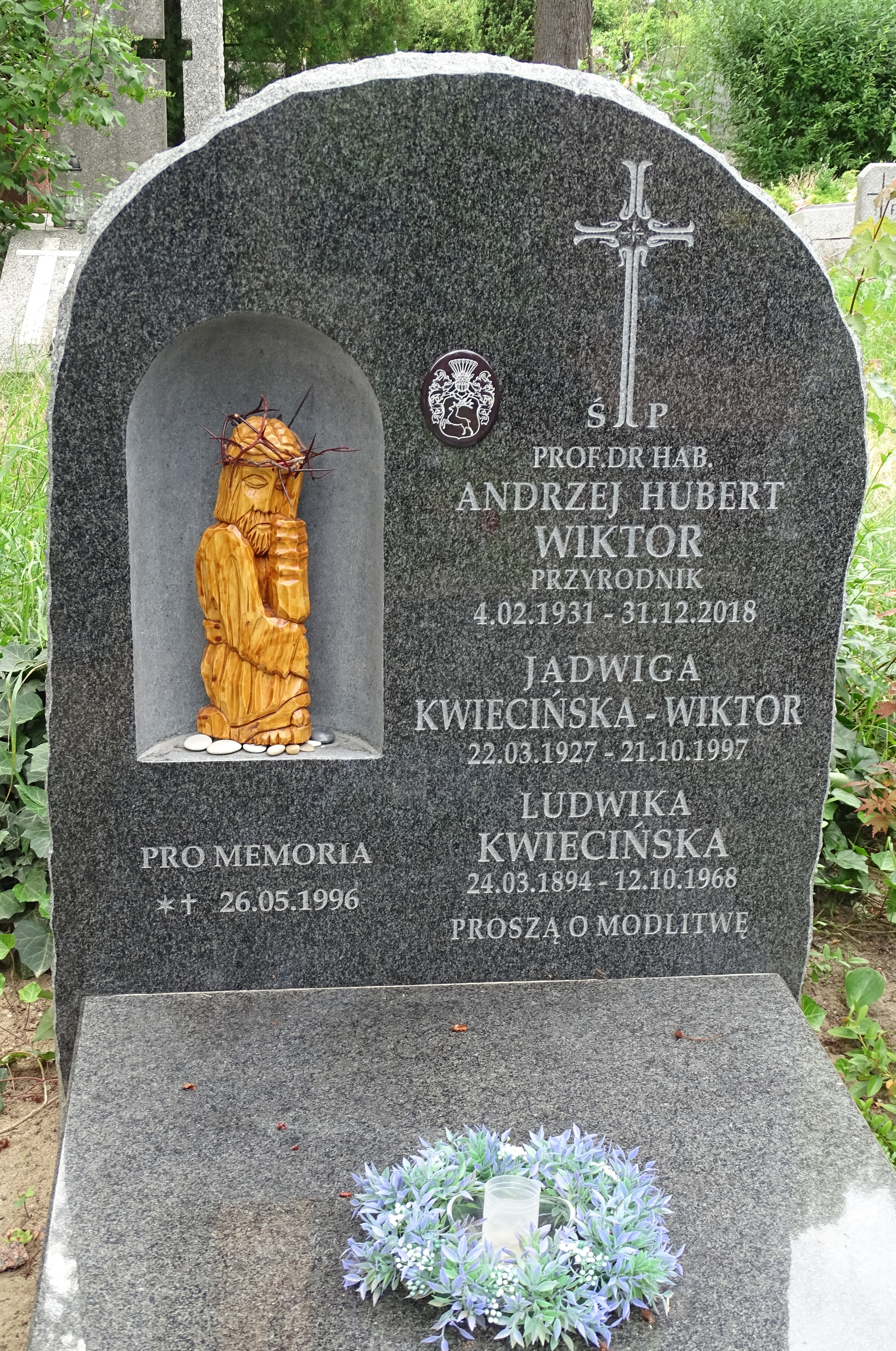

Wiktor was the youngest of four siblings; their father was a landowner but the family were expelled from their land after the communist take-over. His eldest brother, Józef, also became a professor of biology. Andrzej married Jadwiga Kwiecińska in 1954. She died in 1997, and in 2002 he married Hanna Mizgajska. Both his wives were parasitologists and his daughter an anthropologist.

Wiktor was a religious man. He is buried in the cemetery of Świętej Rodziny in Wrocław, together with his first wife and her mother.

== Selected publications ==
- Wiktor, A. (1973) Die Nacktschnecken Polens. Arionidae, Milacidae, Limacidae (Gastropoda, Stylommatophora). Monografie Fauny Polski 1: 1-182 + 97 pp.
- Likharev, I.M., Wiktor, A. (1980) The fauna of slugs of the USSR and adjacent countries (Gatropoda terrestria nuda). Fauna SSSR, Mollyuski III, 3(5). Nauka, Leningrad.
- Wiktor, A., Szigethy, A.S. (1983) The distribution of slugs in Hungary (Gastropoda: Pulmonata) – A házatlan csigák magyarországi elterjedése (Gastropoda: Pulmonata). Soosiana 10/11 (1982/1983): 87–111.
- Wiktor, A. (1983) The slugs of Bulgaria (Arionidae, Milacidae, Limacidae, Agriolimacidae – Gastropoda, Stylommatophora). Annales Zoologici 37: 73–206.
- Wiktor, A. (1983) Some data on slugs of Morocco and Algeria with description of a new Deroceras species. Malakologische Abhandlungen Staatliches Museum für Tierkunde Dresden 8: 155–165.
- Wiktor, A. (1987) Milacidae (Gastropoda, Pulmonata) – systematic monograph. Annales Zoologici 41: 1–319.
- Wiktor, A., Martin, R., Castillejo, J. (1990) A new slug family Papillodermidae with description of a new genus and species from Spain. Malakologische Abhandlungen Staatliches Museum für Tierkunde Dresden 15: 1–18.
- Wiktor, A. (1994) Contribution to the knowledge of the slugs of Turkey (Gastropoda terrestria nuda). Archiv für Molluskenkunde 123: 1–47.
- Wiktor, A. (1996) The slugs of the former Yugoslavia (Gastropoda terrestria nuda – Arionidae, Milacidae, Limacidae, Agriolimacidae). Annales Zoologici 46: 1–110.
- Wiktor, A. (2000) Agriolimacidae (Gastropoda: Pulmonata) – a systematic monograph. Annales Zoologici 49: 347–590.
- Wiktor, A., Chen De-Niu, Wu Ming (2000) Stylommatophoran slugs of China (Gastropoda: Pulmonata) – prodromus. Folia Malacologica 8: 3–35.
- Wiktor, A. (2001) The slugs of Greece (Arionidae, Milacidae, Limacidae, Agriolimacidae – Gastropoda, Stylommatophora). Fauna Graeciae 8: 1–241.
- Wiktor, A. (2001) A review of Anadenidae (Gastropoda: Pulmonata) with a description of a new species. Folia Malacologica 9: 3–26.
- Wiktor, A. (2004) Ślimaki lądowe Polski. Olsztyn: Mantis.
- Wiktor, A., Jurkowska, J. (2007) The collection of terrestrial slugs (Gastropoda: Pulmonata) at the Museum of Natural History, Wrocław University (Poland). Folia Malacologica 15: 83–93.
