= Letourneuxia =

Scientific classification
- Kingdom: Animalia
- Phylum: Mollusca
- Class: Gastropoda
- Order: Stylommatophora
- Family: Arionidae
- Genus: Letourneuxia; Bourguignat, 1866

Type species
- Letourneuxia numidica Bourguignat, 1866

Genus of slugs

Letourneuxia is a genus of large air-breathing land slugs, terrestrial pulmonate gastropod mollusks in the family Arionidae, the roundback slugs.

== Species ==
This genus is monotypic, containing the single species

- Letourneuxia nyctelia (Bourguignat, 1861)

Letourneuxia numidica Bourguignat, 1866 is now considered a junior synonym of L. nyctelia. Letourneuxia moreleti (P. Hesse 1884) is considered either as another synonym of L. nyctelia or as a species in the genus Geomalacus.
