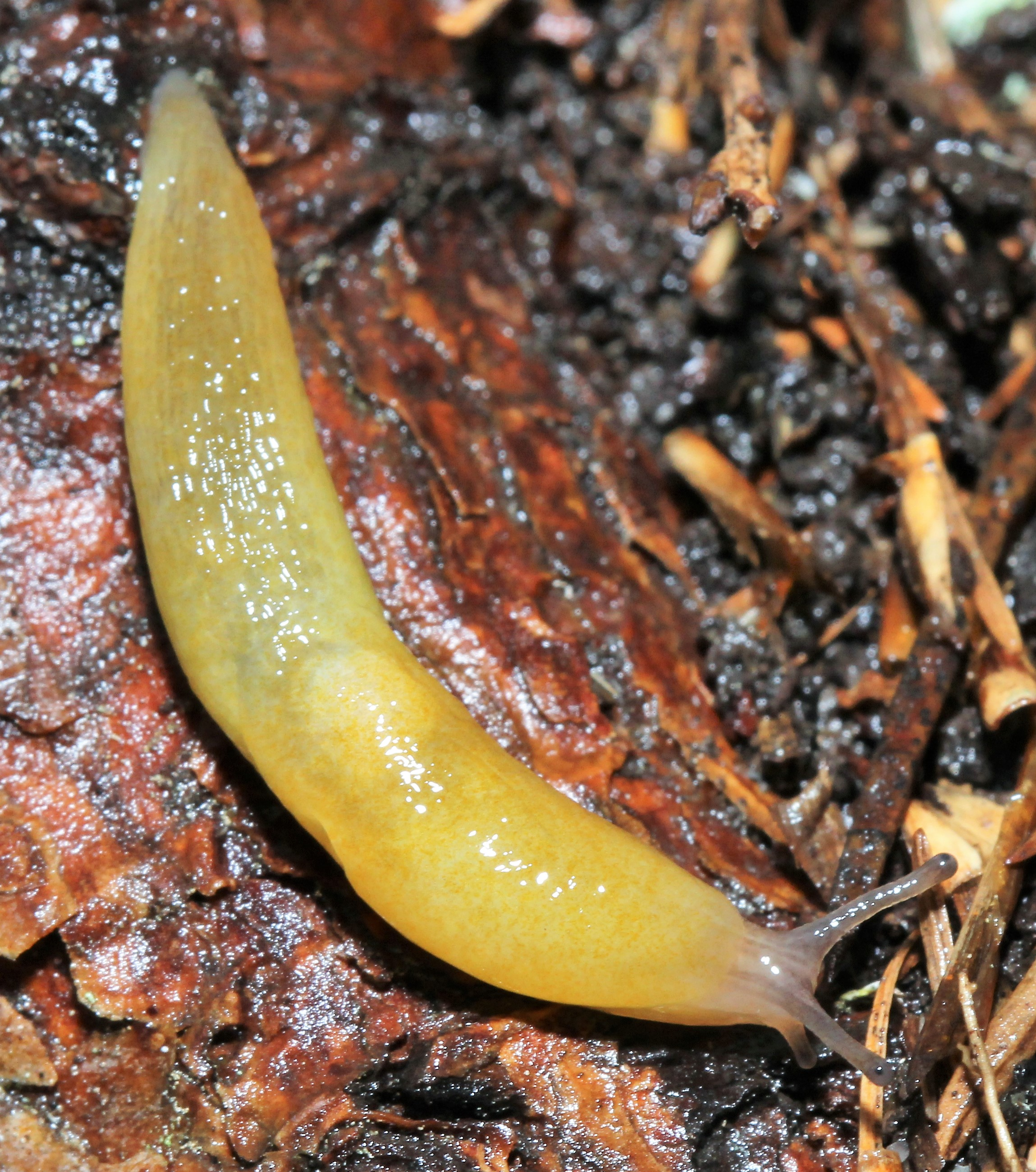
- Malacolimax tenellus

Scientific classification
- Kingdom: Animalia
- Phylum: Mollusca
- Class: Gastropoda
- Order: Stylommatophora
- Family: Limacidae
- Subfamily: Limacinae
- Genus: Malacolimax; Malm, 1868

= Malacolimax =

Genus of gastropods

Malacolimax is a genus of air-breathing land slugs, terrestrial pulmonate gastropod molluscs in the family Limacidae, the keelback slugs. Both known species are bright yellow.

== Species ==
The genus consists of:

- Malacolimax mrazeki (Simroth, 1904)
- Malacolimax tenellus (O.F. Müller, 1774), the type species

An endemic species from Tenerife was described as Malacolimax wiktori Alonso & Ibáñez, 1989 because it lacks an intestinal caecum, but DNA sequences now imply that it belongs in the genus Ambigolimax.
