= Letourneuxia nyctelia =

Scientific classification
- Kingdom: Animalia
- Phylum: Mollusca
- Class: Gastropoda
- Order: Stylommatophora
- Family: Arionidae
- Genus: Letourneuxia
- Species: L. nyctelia

Binomial name
- Letourneuxia nyctelia (Bourguignat, 1861)

Synonyms
- Limax nyctelius Bourguignat, 1861 superseded combination (basionym); Letourneuxia numidica Bourguignat, 1866; Letourneuxia atlantica Bourguignat, 1884; Letourneuxia moreleti (Hesse, 1884); Geomalacus (Letourneuxia) tournieri Pollonera, 1890; Geomalacus (Letourneuxia) marocanus Pollonera, 1916; Ariunculus pallaryi Collinge, 1904

Species of gastropod

Letourneuxia nyctelia is a species of terrestrial slug, a gastropod mollusc, belonging to the family Arionidae.

== Taxonomy ==
For many years this species was known as Letourneuxia numidica, described by Bourguignat from Algeria. The other species of Letourneuxia were synonymised with L. numidica by Wiktor. These included Letourneuxia moreleti, which Castillejo considered instead to be a species of Geomalacus (criticised by).

In 2022 it was proposed that Bourguignat's 1861 description of Limax nyctelius referred to a juvenile of the same species that he described five years later as Letourneuxia numidica. The forward position of the pneumostome is not known in any other North African species, and the stripes match. So the name of this species has now become Letourneuxia nyctelia (Bourguignat, 1861). The lectotype has been designated as the specimen in the illustration referred to in the original species description.

== Distribution and ecology ==
The species is known only from Algeria and Morocco. It has been found mostly in woodland and scrub.

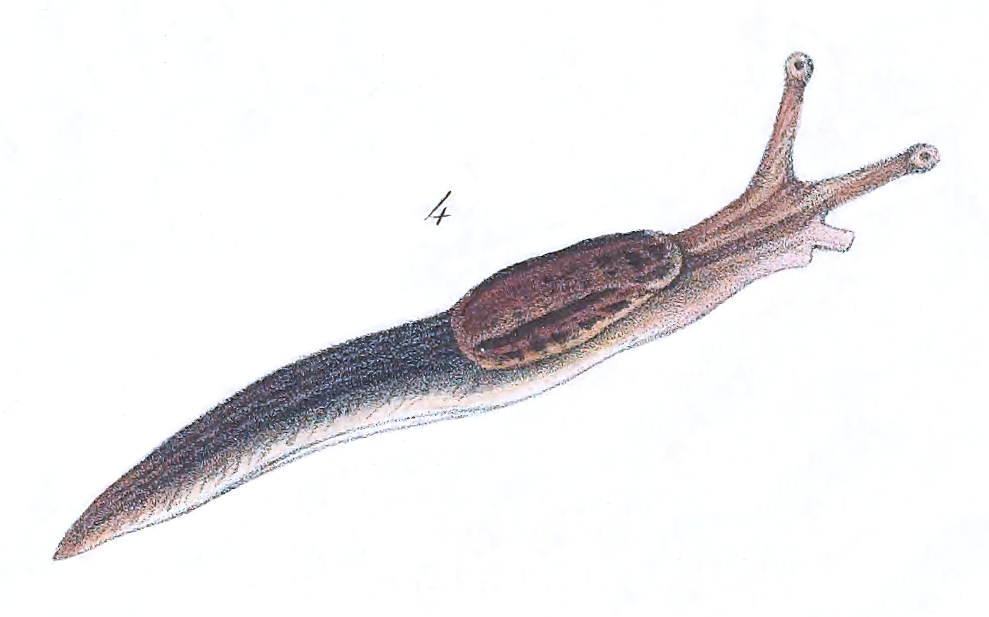
Hand-coloured print from Bourguignat (1862: Plate 2 Figure 4), showing the lectotype of Letourneuxia nyctelia; it is juvenile, and the pointed tail is not realistic for this species

== Morphology ==
Maximum length is 65 mm. As with other arionids, the pneumostome is in the front part of the mantle and the tail is rounded without a keel. The colour is tawny brown with darker longitudinal stripes along the back and side. The sole is divided into three parts, with the central part only a third the width of each side part. There is an internal shell plate. Unlike in the other arionid genera Arion and Geomalacus, an epiphallus is lacking. Like with Geomalacus, the chromosome number is n = 31.
