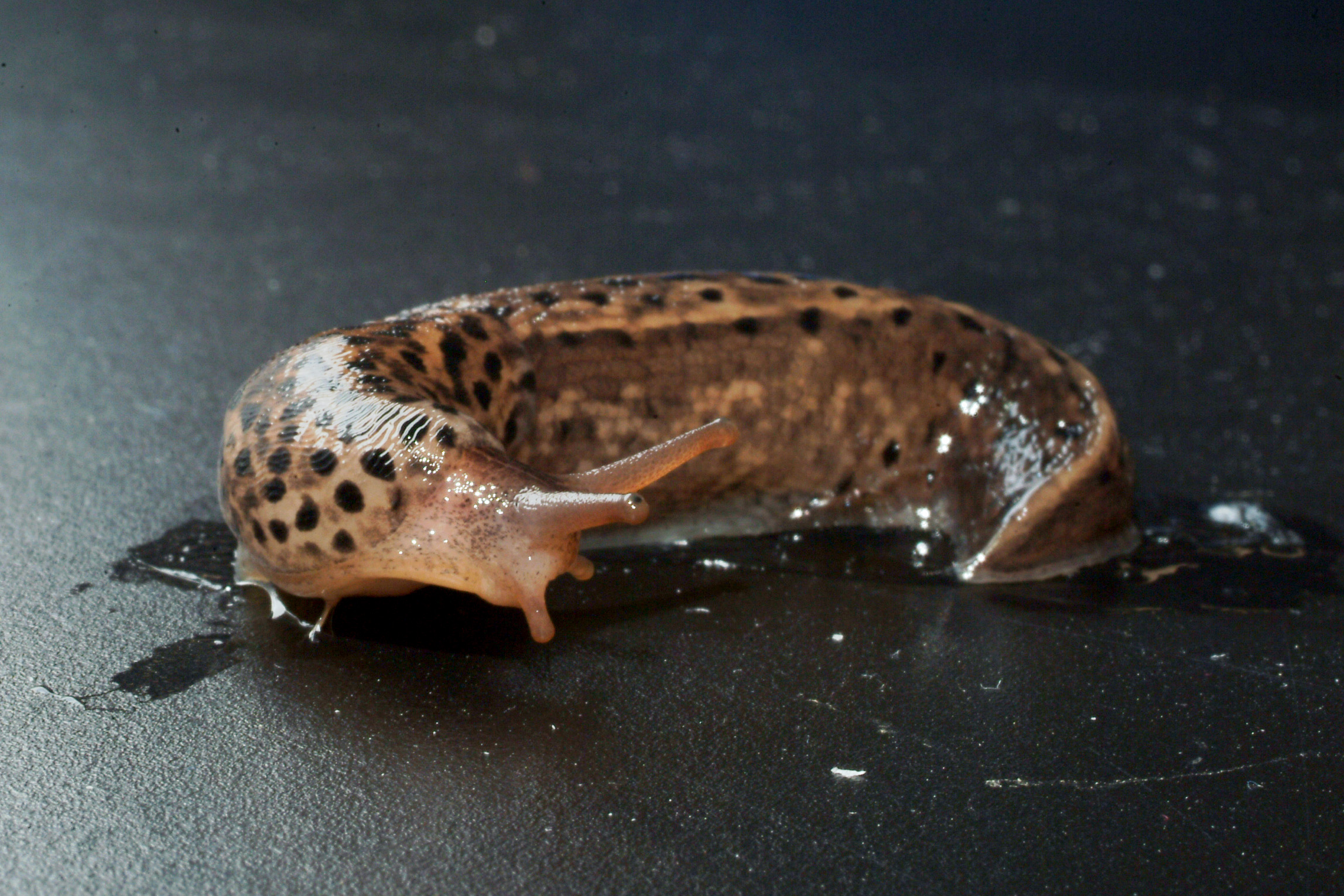
- A live individual of Limax maximus

Scientific classification
- Kingdom: Animalia
- Phylum: Mollusca
- Class: Gastropoda
- Order: Stylommatophora
- Superfamily: Limacoidea
- Family: Limacidae; Batsch, 1789

Diversity
- 13 genera, 107 species (as of 2025)

= Limacidae =

Family of keelback slugs

Limacidae, also known by their common name the keelback slugs, are a taxonomic family of medium-sized to very large, air-breathing land slugs, terrestrial pulmonate gastropod molluscs in the superfamily Limacoidea.

== Distribution ==
The natural distribution of the family Limacidae is the Western Palaearctic and into adjacent parts of Asia, but species such as Limacus flavus, Limax maximus and Ambigolimax valentianus have been introduced almost worldwide in temperate regions. There are 28 species of Limacidae in Russia and adjacent countries.

== Cytology ==
In this family, the number of haploid chromosomes lies between 21 and 25 and also lies between 31 and 35 (according to the values in this table).

== Genera ==
Currently recognised genera in the family Limacidae are:

subfamily Eumilacinae Likharev & Wiktor, 1980

- Eumilax O. Boettger, 1881 - type genus of the subfamily Eumilacinae
- Metalimax Simroth, 1896

subfamily Limacinae Batsch, 1789

- Ambigolimax Pollonera, 1887; formerly considered a subgenus of Lehmannia
- Bielzia Clessin, 1887 – with the only species Bielzia coerulans M. Bielz, 1851. Some authors, for example Russian malacologists, have classified Bielzia within its own family Bielzidae (= Limacopsidae) or subfamily Bielzinae, but a molecular phylogeny has subsequently placed it within Limacinae.
- Caspilimax P. Hesse, 1926
- Gigantomilax O. Boettger, 1883
- Lehmannia Heynemann, 1863; formerly considered a subgenus of Limax
- Limacus Lehmann, 1864; sometimes considered a subgenus of Limax
- Limax Linnaeus, 1758 – type genus of Limacidae; c. half the recognised species in the family
- Malacolimax Malm, 1868; formerly considered a subgenus of Limax
- Svanetia Hesse, 1926
- Turcomilax Simroth, 1902
- Weltersia Giusti et al. 2021 – with the only species W. obscura Giusti et al. 2021

== Cladograms ==
A cladogram showing the phylogenic relationships of this family to other families within the limacoid clade:

- limacoid clade
  - Staffordioidea
    Staffordiidae
  - - - Dyakioidea
        Dyakiidae
      - Gastrodontoidea
        - Pristilomatidae
        - - Chronidae
          - - Euconulidae
            - Trochomorphidae
          - - Gastrodontidae
            - Oxychilidae
    - - Parmacelloidea
        - Trigonochlamydidae
        - Parmacellidae
        - Milacidae
      - - - Zonitoidea
            Zonitidae
          - Helicarionoidea
            - Helicarionidae
            - - Ariophantidae
              - Urocyclidae
        - Limacoidea
          - Vitrinidae
          - - Boettgerillidae
            - - Limacidae
              - Agriolimacidae

A molecular-based phylogeny of the genera within the Limacidae. Metalimax and Caspilimax were not included in the study.

- Limacidae
  - Eumilacinae
    Eumilax
  - Limacinae
    - - Svanitia
      - Gigantomilax
    - - - Limax
        - Turcomilax
        - Limacus
      - - - Weltersia
          - Malacolimax
          - Lehmannia
        - Bielzia
        - Ambigolimax

== Ecology ==
Parasites of slugs in this family include larvae of the marsh flies Sciomyzidae.
