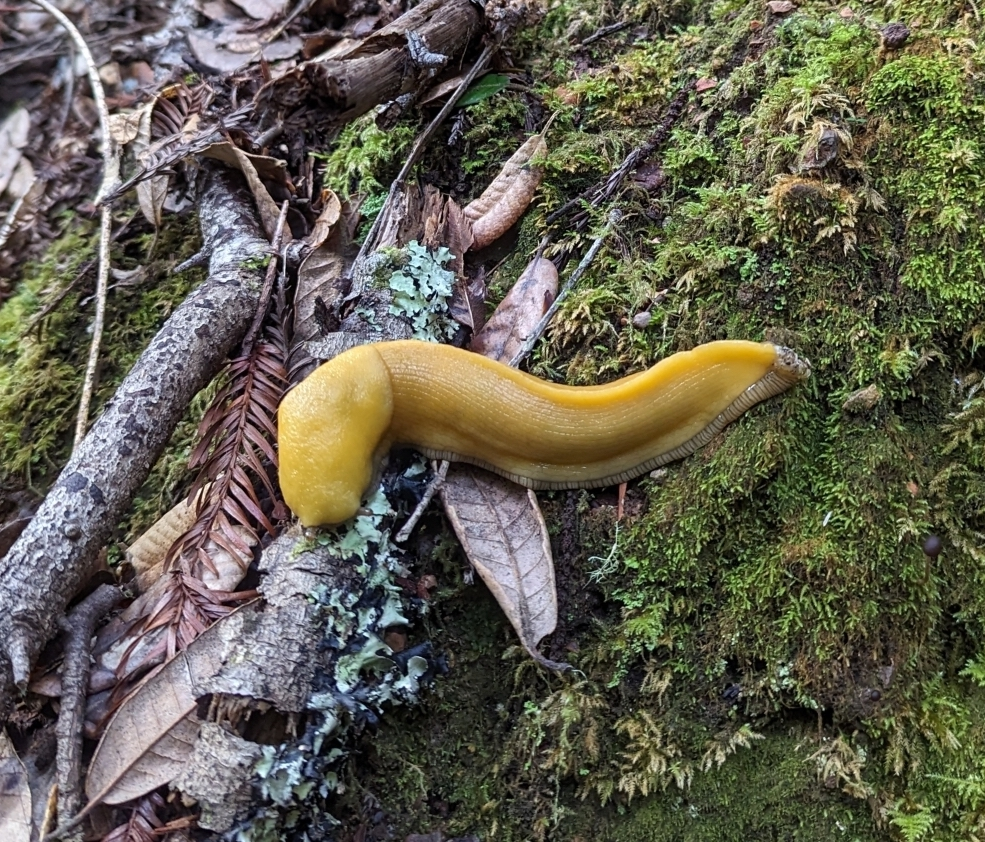

Conservation status
- Imperiled (NatureServe)

Scientific classification
- Kingdom: Animalia
- Phylum: Mollusca
- Class: Gastropoda
- Order: Stylommatophora
- Family: Ariolimacidae
- Genus: Ariolimax
- Species: A. californicus

Binomial name
- Ariolimax californicus (J. G. Cooper, 1872)

= Ariolimax californicus =

Species of slug

Ariolimax californicus, the California banana slug, is a species of terrestrial slug from the coast range of the San Francisco Peninsula. It was first described by J. G. Cooper in 1872.

== Description ==
Cooper originally described A. californicus as resembling A. columbianus with more numerous dorsal grooves. However, the only reliable way to distinguish species morphologically is by examining the genitalia. At the molecular level, A. californicus and A. dolichophallus are genetically identical, but they can be distinguished by both genitalia and sexual behavior.

== Natural history ==
Ariolimax californicus is known for its unique mating behaviors. Like other banana slugs, it is a simultaneous hermaphrodite, bearing both male and female sexual organs, and it can perform simultaneously reciprocal reproduction, where both slugs act as males and females at the same time. The two slugs align their genitals by biting and twisting in the shape of yin and yang. However, simultaneously reciprocal reproduction is less common in A. californicus than other species of Ariolimax. Sexually mature A. californicus slugs have been observed without male reproductive organs. Along with A. dolichophallus and the distantly related Deroceras laeve, A. californicus is the only species known to exhibit apophallation, where individuals chew off the penis of their partner after copulation. The severer typically eats the organ after it has dismembered its partner. The reason for this behavior is largely unknown, but some speculate that it provides nutritional benefits to the severer, or that it prevents the amputee from mating, mitigating the risk of sperm competition.
