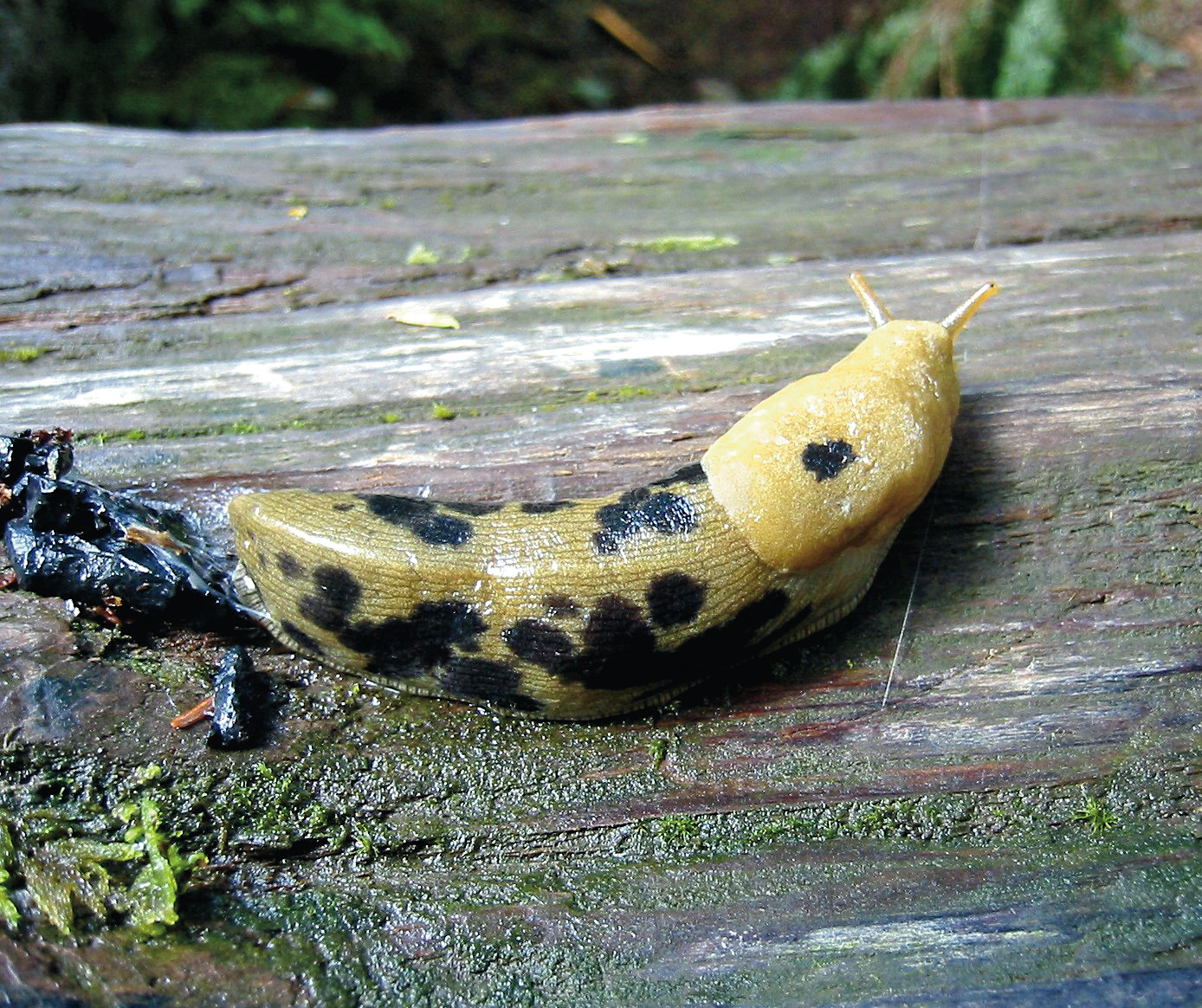

Conservation status
- Secure (NatureServe)

Scientific classification
- Kingdom: Animalia
- Phylum: Mollusca
- Class: Gastropoda
- Order: Stylommatophora
- Family: Ariolimacidae
- Genus: Ariolimax
- Species: A. columbianus

Binomial name
- Ariolimax columbianus (Gould, 1851)

Synonyms
- List: Ariolimax columbianus f. maculatus Cockerell, 1891; Ariolimax columbianus f. niger Cockerell, 1891; Ariolimax columbianus f. typicus Cockerell, 1891; Ariolimax columbianus var. maculatus W.G. Binney, 1890; Ariolimax steindachneri Babor, 1900; Limax columbianus Gould, 1851

= Ariolimax columbianus =

Species of slug

Ariolimax columbianus, the Pacific banana slug, is a species of slug found on the Pacific coast of North America. It is the second-largest species of terrestrial slug in the world, growing up to 260 millimeters long when fully extended. Up until the early 2000s, the species was confused with Ariolimax buttoni due to anatomy, but studies showed that they were separate populations.

Ariolimax columbianus also displays a variety of behavioral and ecological responses to their environment. Studies have documented individuals huddling together to keep warm. These slugs can also play a role in seed dispersion.

== Anatomy ==
Ariolimax columbianus can be between 180 and 260 millimeters long when fully extended, making it the second largest terrestrial slug in the world, and the largest of the North American continent. Individuals are often bright yellow, but they can also be greenish, brown, tan, or white. Irregular black spots can cover the tail, sometimes so extensively that the tail may appear completely black. Individual slugs can also change color from changes in their environment and eating habits, and can also indicate if a slug is healthy or injured.

The mantle of the slug (a large fleshy lobe) lies close to its head, and its breathing-hole, or pneumostome, is located on the right of the mantle. Two grooves lie on either side of the slug above their feet, also known as "pedal furrows." The tail of the slug is ridged, and a caudal pit (a mucus secreting pit) sits at the end of the tail, where the two pedal furrows meet.

Internally, Ariolimax columbianus has a nervous system akin to that of the Burgundy snail (Helix pomatia) and Yellow slug (Limacus flavus); clusters of nerve cells controlling the feet, mantle, and other sets of muscles are packed tightly together, with little space between.

== Distribution ==
Ariolimax columbianus is endemic to the Pacific Northwest, and inhabits forests ranging from the northern California coast to Alaska. It is the only species of the genus Ariolimax found outside of California. It is found in moist and damp areas of the forest floor.

A few individuals of A. columbianus were imported to parts of Europe (e.g., Southern Sweden in 2005, 2014, and 2015) through the global distribution and shipping of salal.

== Taxonomy ==
A. columbianus was first described as Limax columbianus in 1851 by naturalist Augustus Addison Gould. Later, in 1859, Danish malacologist Otto Andreas Lowson Mörch created the genus Ariolimax, making A. columbianus its type species. In 1896, A. buttoni was introduced by Henry A. Pilsbry and E. G. Vanatta, consisting of aphallic individuals, but after malacologist Harold Heath’s 1916 discovery of apophallation in slugs, the species was later merged into A. columbianus, since it was believed that the apophallation had resulted in the presence of aphallic individuals.

More recently, in 2004, malacologist Barry Roth suggested that this classification was in fact incorrect, hypothesizing that the individuals of A. buttoni were simply born without lower male reproductive organs. Roth and Patricia Sadeghian furthered this in 2007, and formally designated A. buttoni as separate from A. columbianus. A study in the same year by Janet Leonard and colleagues confirmed this finding through the discovery of individuals of A. buttoni that were born aphallic.

== Behavior and ecology ==
A. columbianus can travel between five and 10 meters a day, and tend to avoid following paths that already contain slime, either from themselves or from other individuals. They can also exhibit homing behavior: slugs are able to return to the same location even after long periods of time, even within 50 centimeters.

This species also exhibits different behavioral responses to changing temperatures. On hot summer days, for example, A. columbianus is known to huddle together with other individuals on moist logs to regulate their body temperature, while at night, slugs may climb onto plants or other elevated surfaces to keep warm. During rains, banana slugs can climb onto tree trunks or shelter under leaves to avoid getting wet.

Regarding feeding and diet, A. columbianus are generalized herbivores known to feed on the fruits of huckleberries and salal, Himalayan blackberry and salmonberry, Oregon grape, and red elderberry plants. Foraging activity is reduced during adverse weather conditions (e.g., drought, heavy rain, or extreme temperatures). During hot summer months, individuals may redirect energy into finding suitable microhabitats to estivate instead of foraging.

The species plays at least a minor role in seed dispersal in forests: seeds of the plants eaten by the slugs were mostly viable after being ingested and redistributed by individuals. They can also act in secondary dispersal, through the reconsumption of fecal matter containing seeds from other animals. However, its efficacy is uncertain, due to the fact that slugs tend to only travel short distances.

In experiments, Trowbridge’s shrew, the Vagrant shrew, and the American shrew mole have been observed to attack and prey on individuals of A. columbianus. Larger banana slugs were less successfully attacked and often left alone, suggesting that these banana slugs may reach a certain “escape size” that would make predation less likely.

== Gallery ==
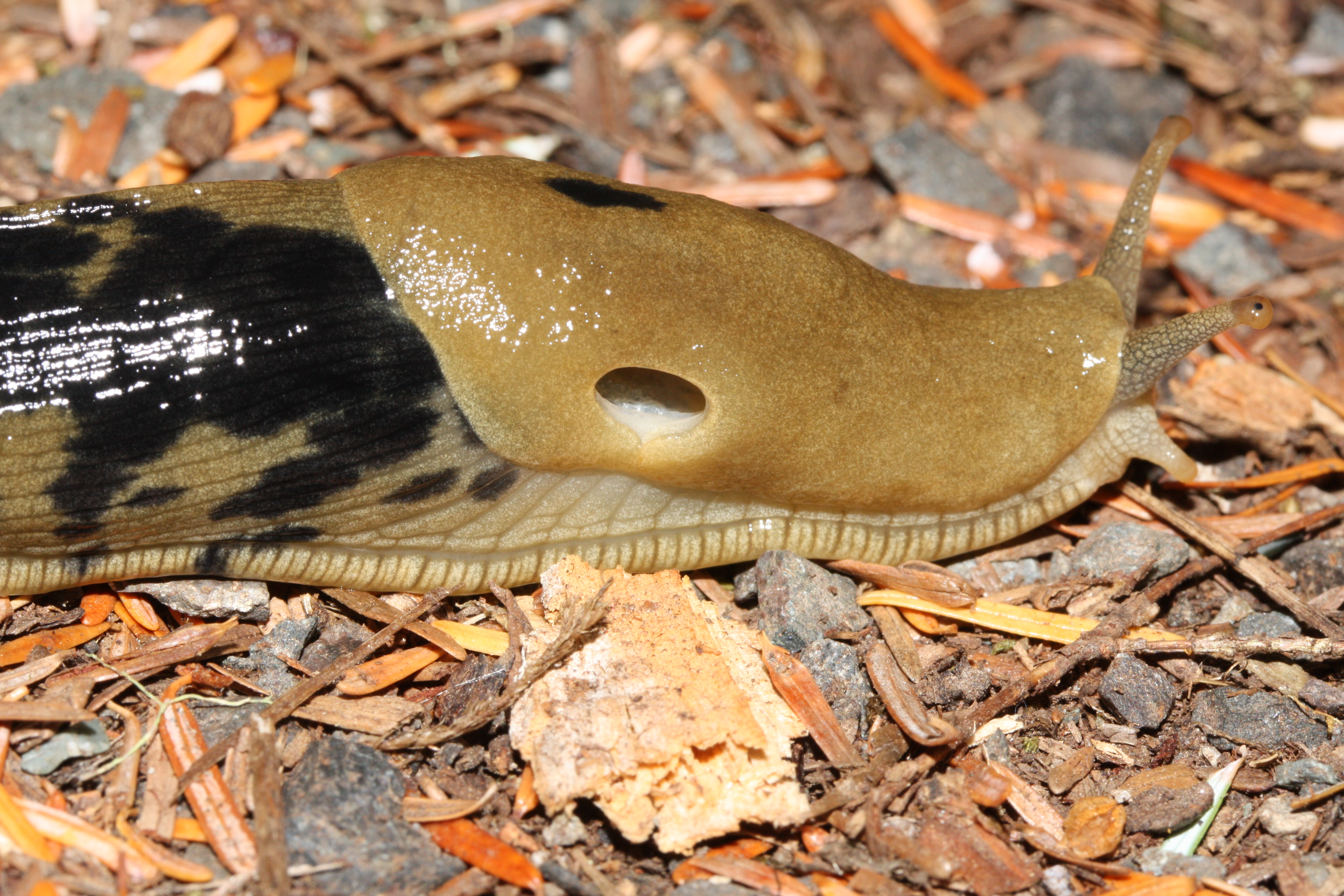
Mantle, note the prominent pneumostome.

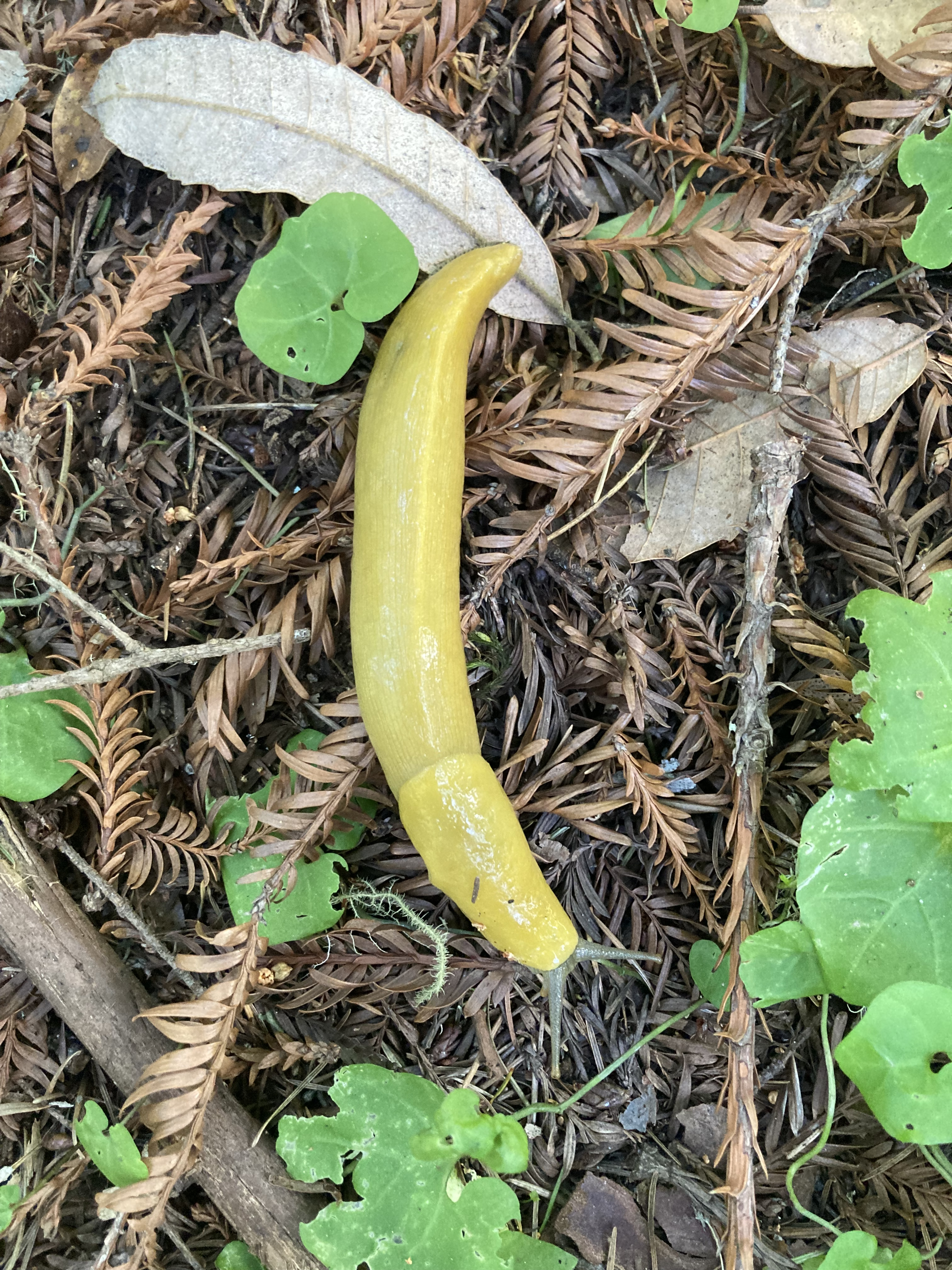
Yellow morph from the Henry Cowell Redwoods.

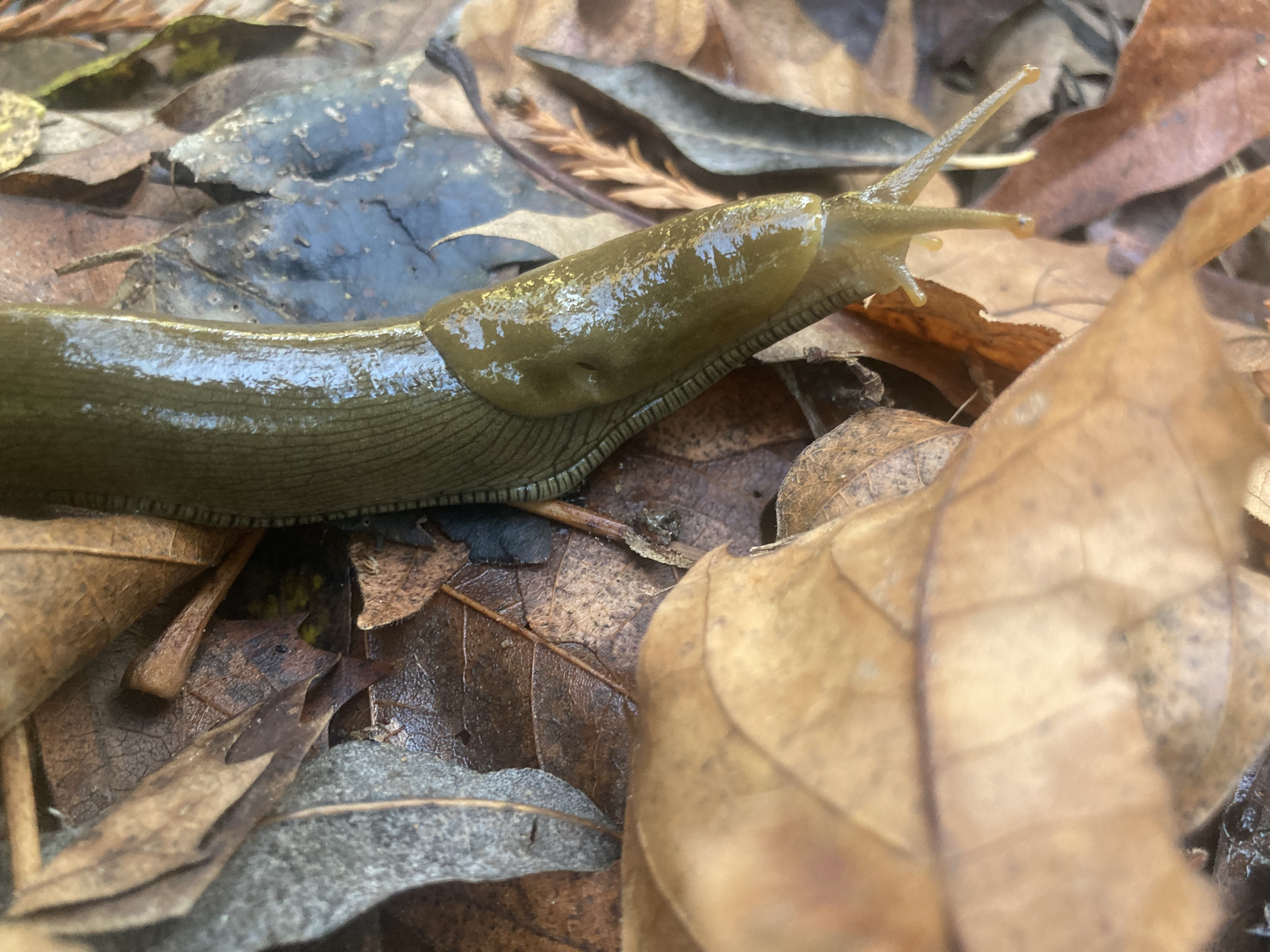
Brown version at Reinhardt Redwood Regional Reserve.

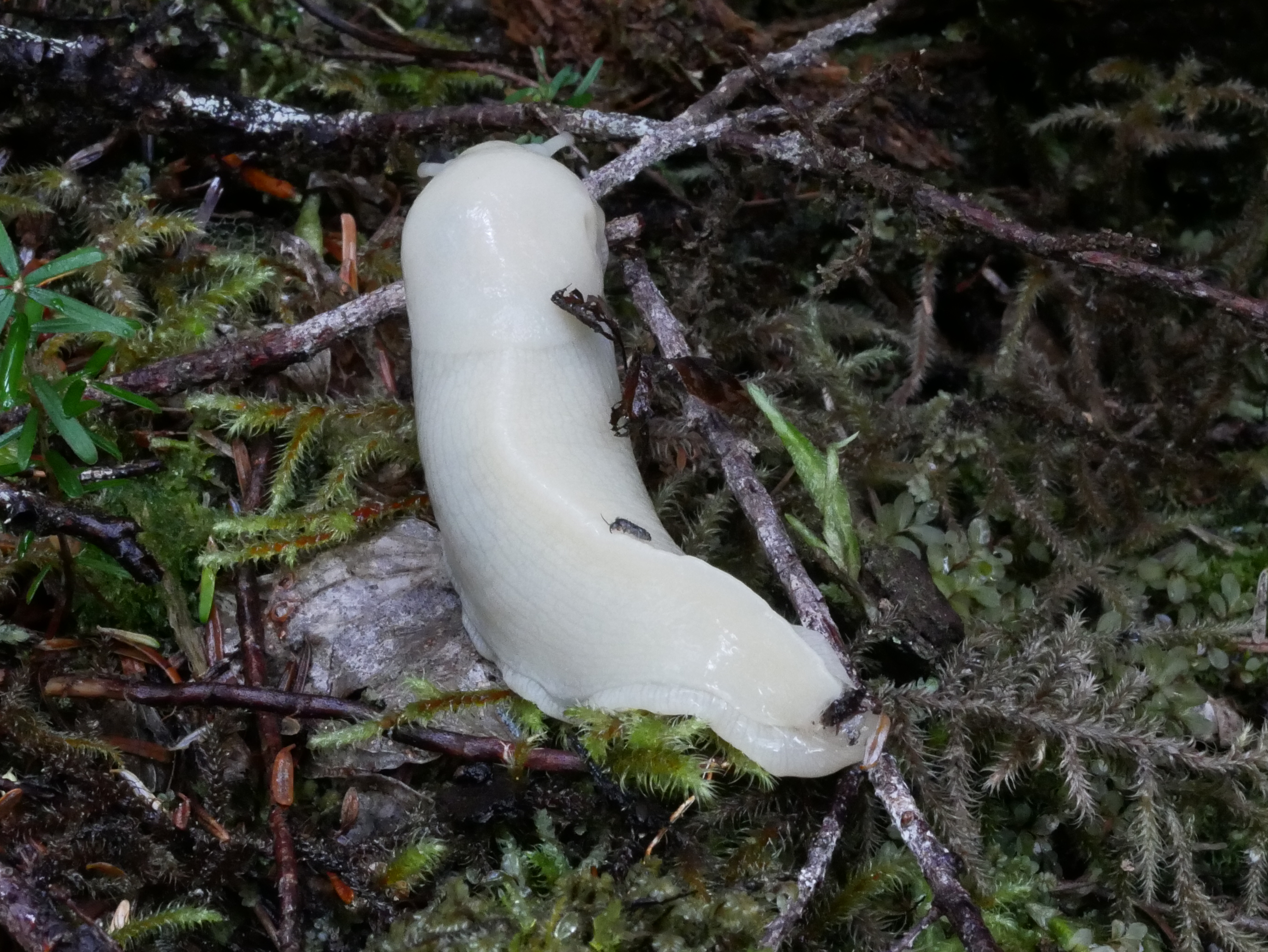
Tail, note full length foot fringe and keel. This individual appears to lack melanin, possibly displaying albinism.

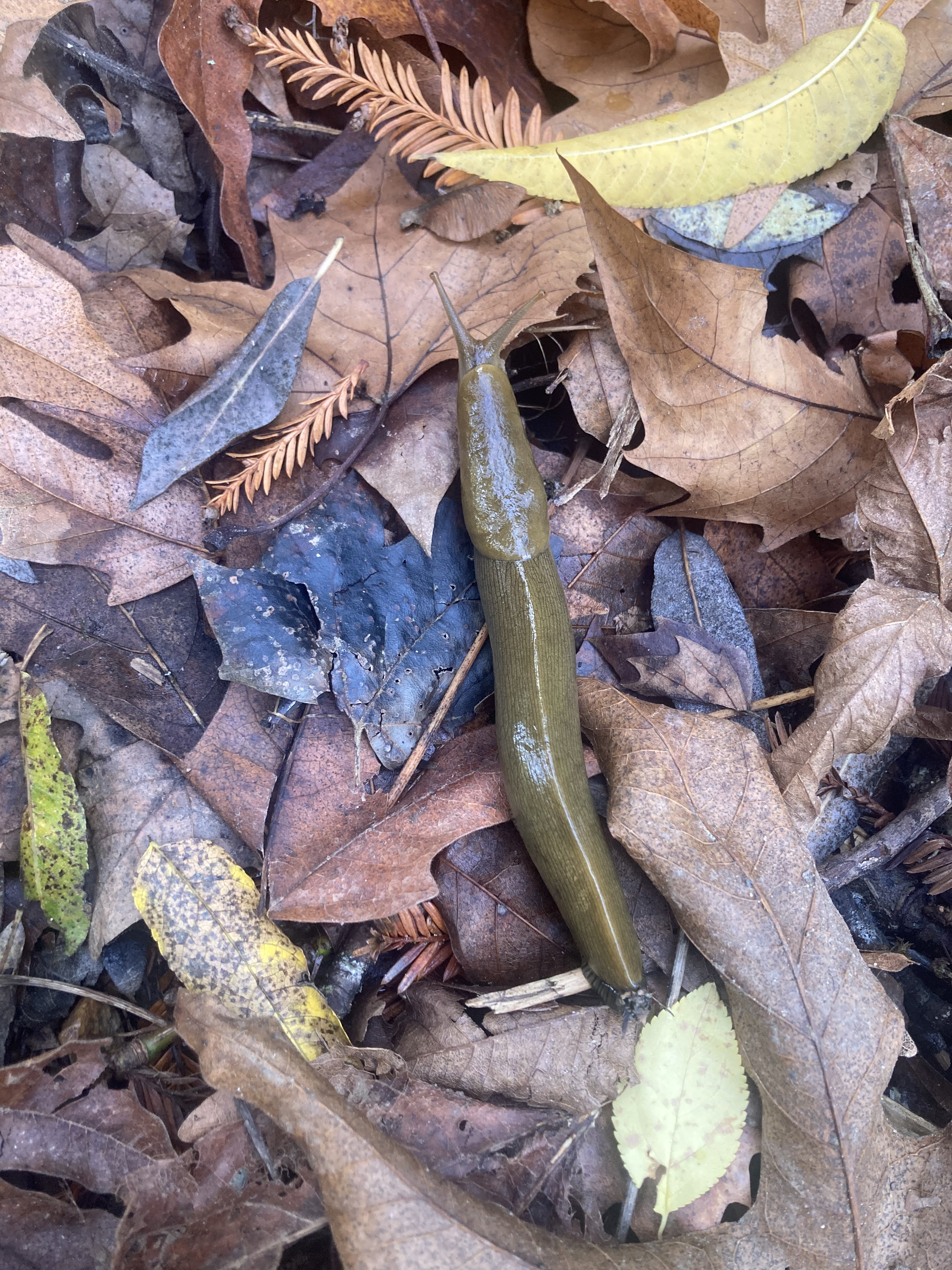
Blending in with the leaf litter.

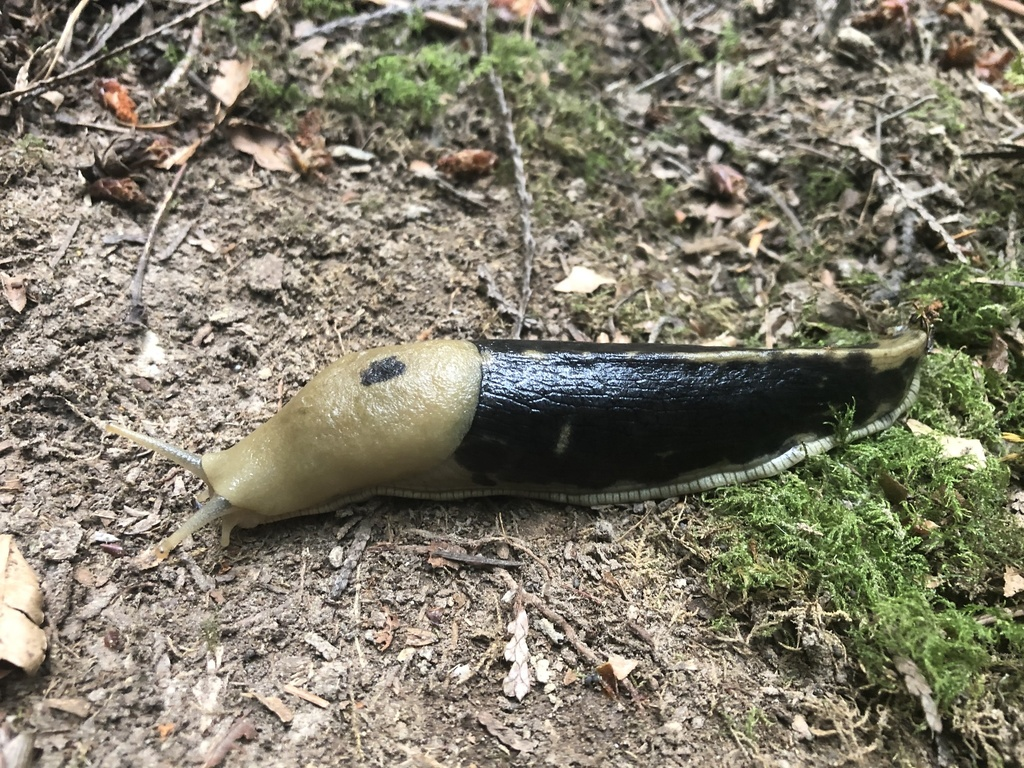
A Pacific banana slug whose tail appears to be nearly entirely black.

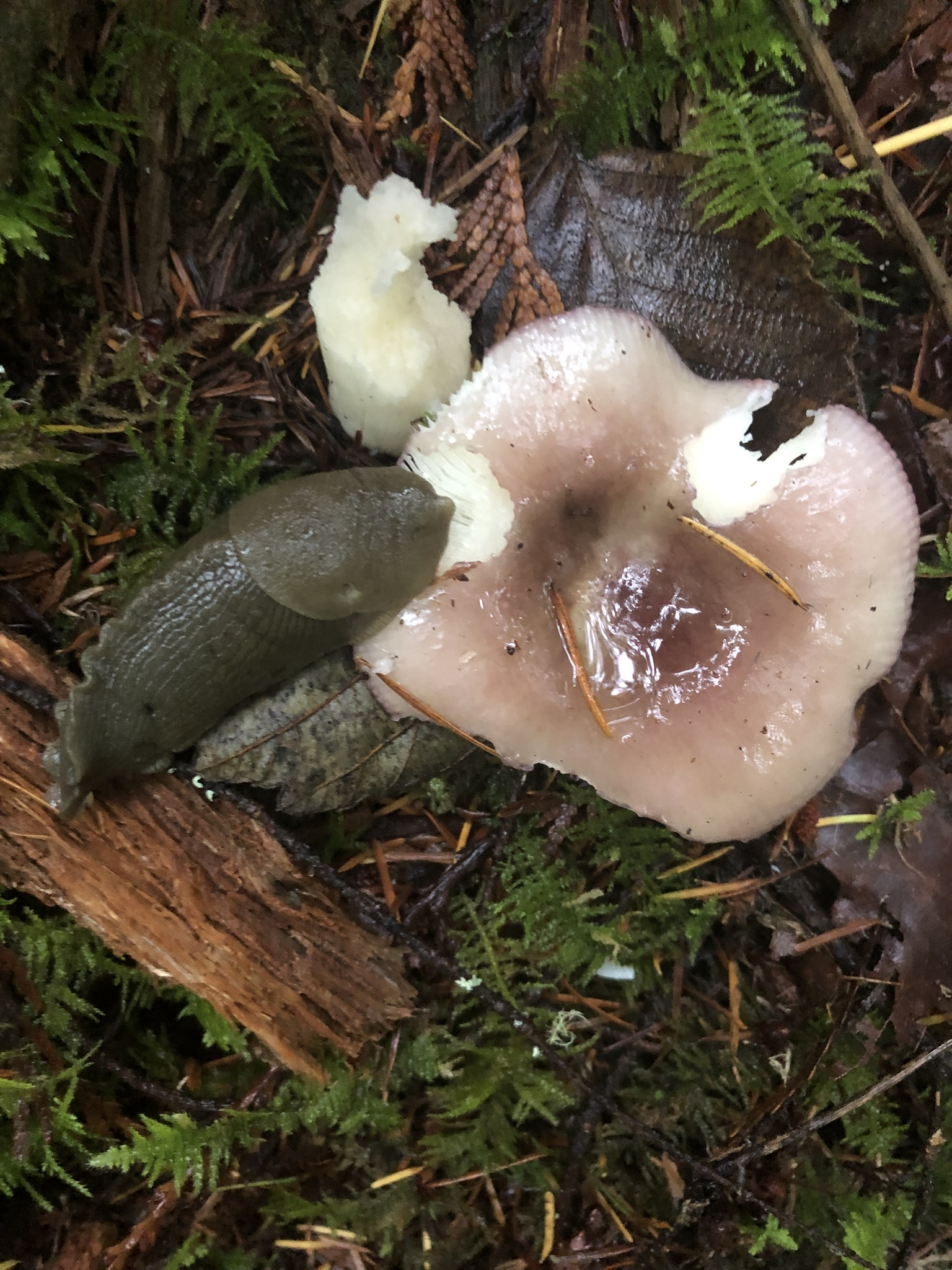
Feeding on a mushroom.

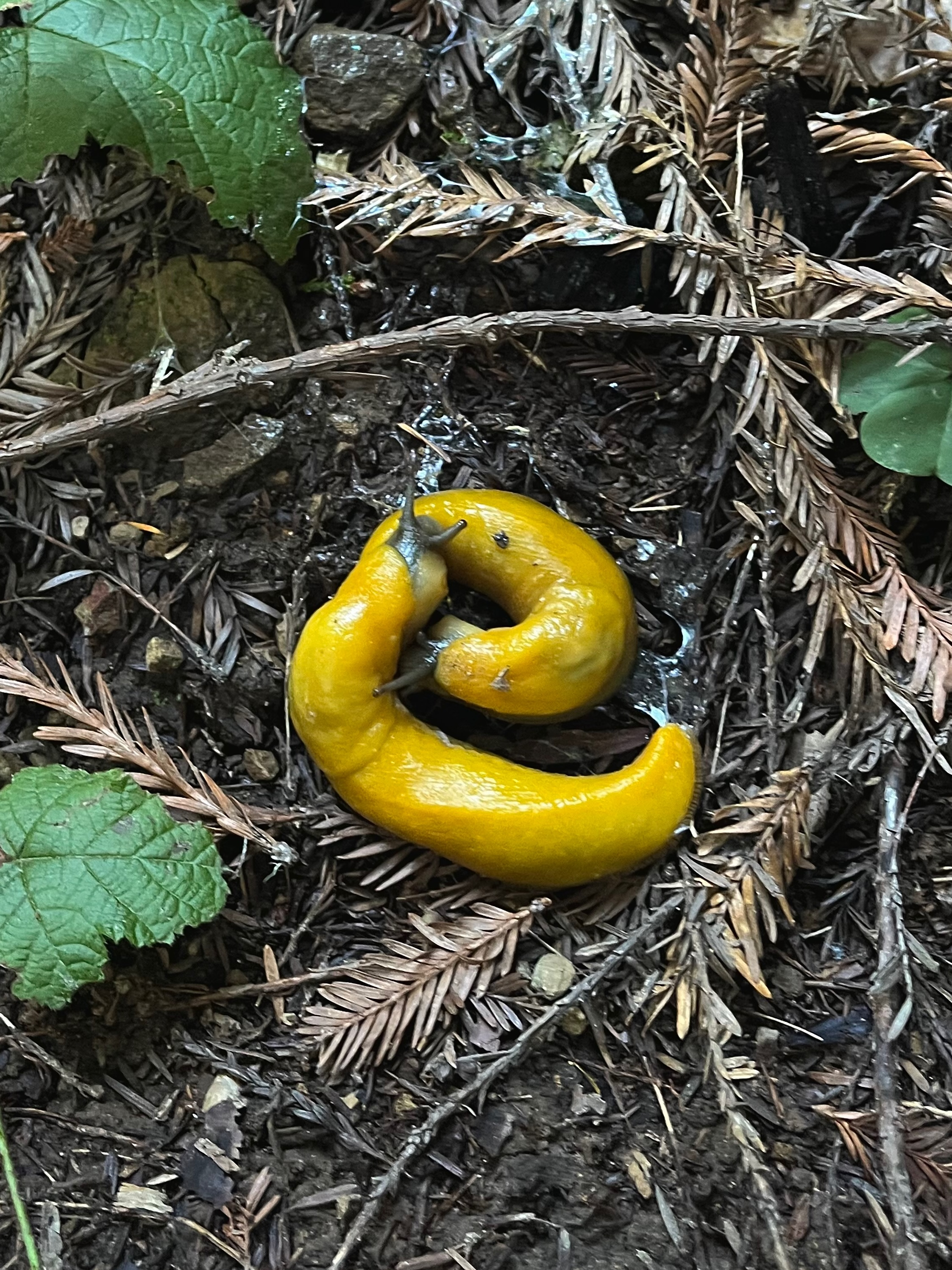
Two yellow Pacific Banana Slugs on the forest floor.
