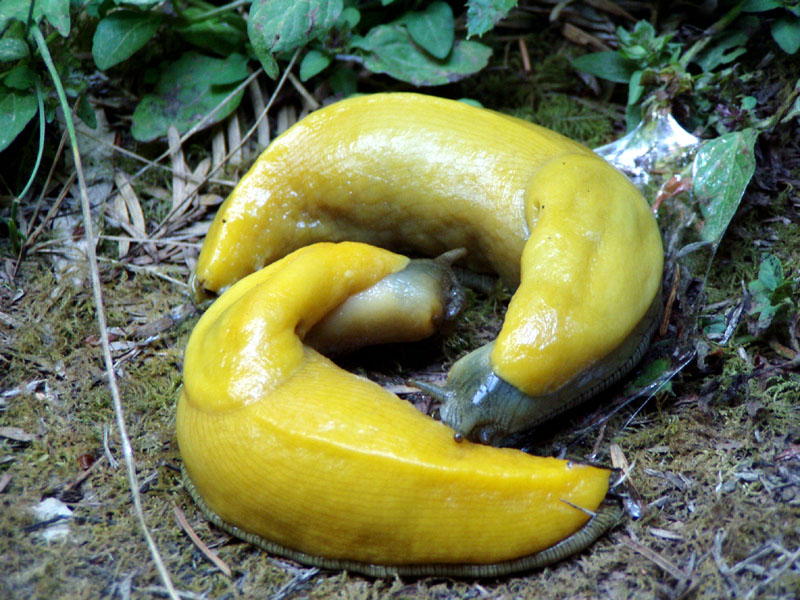
- Two banana slugs preparing to mate

Scientific classification
- Kingdom: Animalia
- Phylum: Mollusca
- Class: Gastropoda
- Order: Stylommatophora
- Superfamily: Arionoidea
- Family: Ariolimacidae
- Subfamily: Ariolimacinae
- Genus: Ariolimax; Mörch, 1859

Type species
- Ariolimax columbianus

Synonyms
- Aphallarion Pilsbry & Vanatta, 1896

= Banana slug =

Genus of molluscs

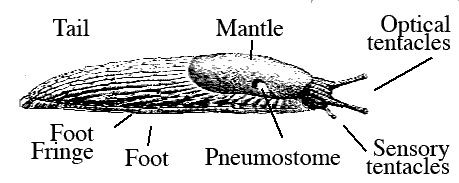
Anatomy of a slug

Banana slugs (Ariolimax) are a genus of air-breathing, terrestrial gastropod slugs in the family Ariolimacidae. They are often yellow in color and their elongated shape can resemble a banana, thus giving rise to their common name.

== Species ==
Species within the genus Ariolimax include:

Image	Scientific name	Common name	Distribution	Description
	Ariolimax buttoni (Pilsbry & Vanatta, 1896)	Button's banana slug	California	Single spot on the mantle
	Ariolimax californicus (J. G. Cooper, 1872)	California banana slug	San Francisco Peninsula, California	Light yellow, Length 175–200mm
	Ariolimax columbianus (Gould, 1851)	Pacific banana slug	United States (Alaska, California, Idaho, Oregon, Washington), Canada (British Columbia)	Olive green with black spots and blotches, Length 185–260mm
	Ariolimax dolichophallus (Mead, 1943)	Slender banana slug	Santa Cruz Mountains, California	Light yellow, Length 150–180mm
	Ariolimax stramineus (Hemphill, 1891)	Southern Pacific banana slug	Coastal Central and Southern California	

Synonyms:

Banana slug in Washington

- Ariolimax andersonii J. G. Cooper, 1872: synonym of Prophysaon andersonii (J.G. Cooper, 1872) (unaccepted combination)
- Ariolimax californicus J.G. Cooper, 1872: synonym of Ariolimax californicus J.G. Cooper, 1872
- Ariolimax californicus costaricensis Cockerell, 1890: synonym of Deroceras costaricensis (Cockerell, 1890)
- Ariolimax hemphilli W. G. Binney, 1875: synonym of Hesperarion hemphilli (W.G. Binney, 1875)
- Ariolimax niger J. G. Cooper, 1872: synonym of Hesperarion niger (J. G. Cooper, 1872)
- Ariolimax steindachneri Babor, 1900: synonym of Ariolimax columbianus (Gould, 1851)

== Description ==
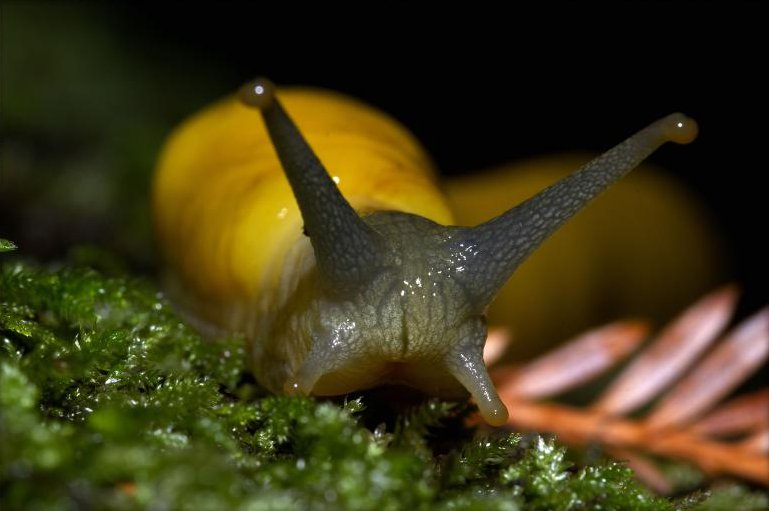
Head, optic tentacles, and sensory tentacles of a banana slug

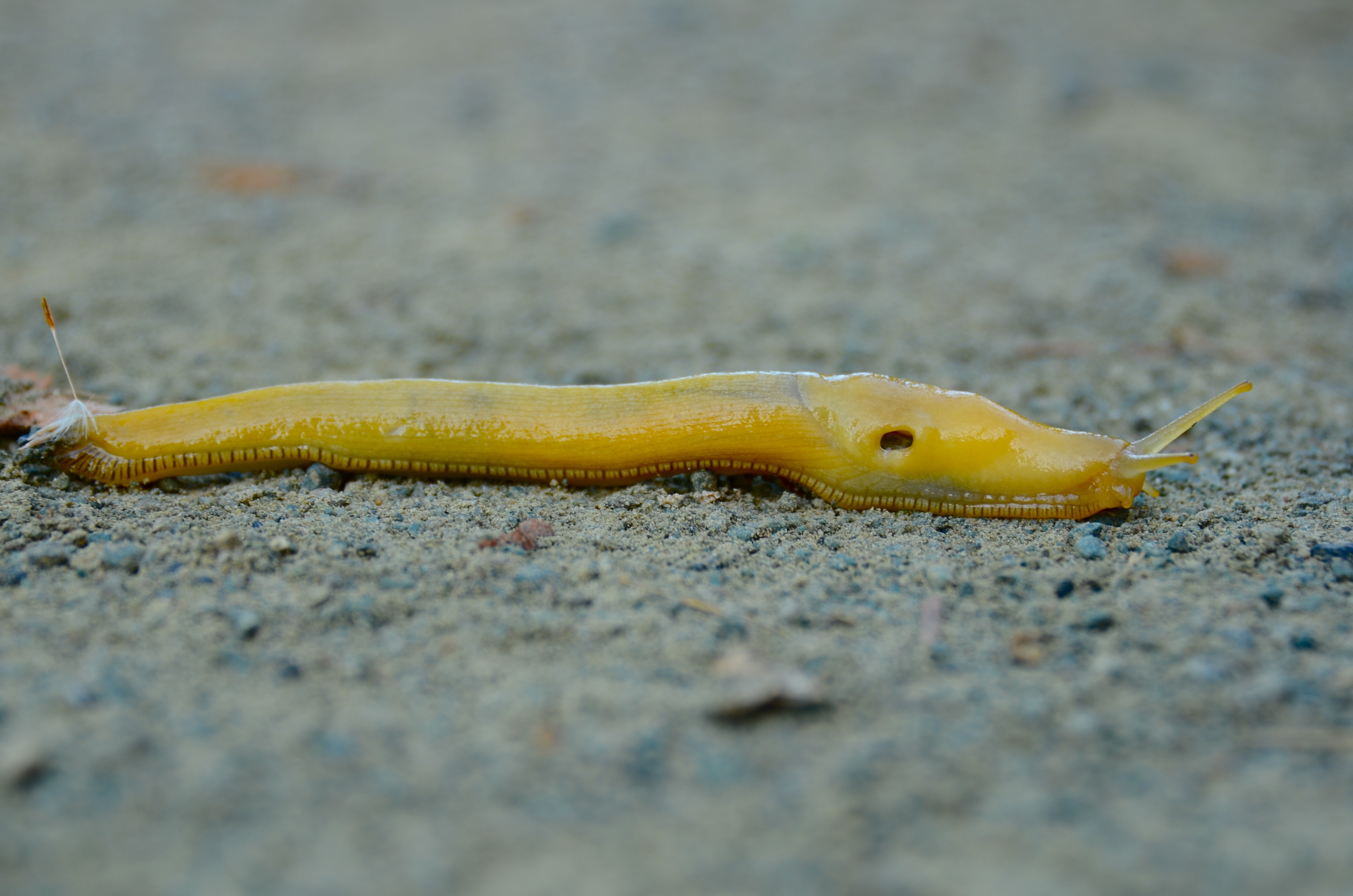
Slender banana slug (Ariolimax dolichophallus)

Banana slugs are often bright yellow (giving rise to the "banana" nomenclature) although they may also be greenish, brown, tan, or white. The species Ariolimax columbianus sometimes has black spots that are so extensive that the animal can look almost entirely black. Individual slugs can change colors with alterations in diet, light exposure, and moisture levels. Color may also be an indicator of the age or health status of an individual.

The Pacific banana slug is the second-largest species of terrestrial slug in the world, achieving a length of up to 25 centimetres (9.8 in) and a weight of up to 115 grams (4.1 ounces). The largest slug species is Limax cinereoniger, which can reach 30 centimetres (12 in) in length. Banana slugs have an average lifespan of 1–7 years.

Banana slugs (like other gastropods and many other mollusks) have a radula, a ribbon-like anatomical structure covered in rows of microscopic teeth. The radula is used for feeding. Individuals can move at 6 1/2 inches (17 cm) per minute.

Slugs use two pairs of tentacles to sense their environment. The longer, upper pair are used to detect light or movement. The shorter, lower pair are used to detect chemicals. Both pairs of tentacles are muscular hydrostats which can be fully retracted when necessary to avoid damage. If the animal loses a tentacle, the slug can grow a new one.

Banana slugs have a single pallial lung which opens externally via a pneumostome on the right side of the mantle of the animal. The pneumostome lung cavity is heavily vascularized to allow gas exchange. Dehydration is a major problem for the mollusk; to combat this, banana slugs excrete a thick coating of mucus around their bodies and can also aestivate. To do so, they secrete a protective layer of mucus and insulate themselves with a layer of soil and leaves. They remain inactive in this state until the environment becomes moist again. Due to their susceptibility to desiccation, they are more commonly active at night, but also appear during cool, moist days.

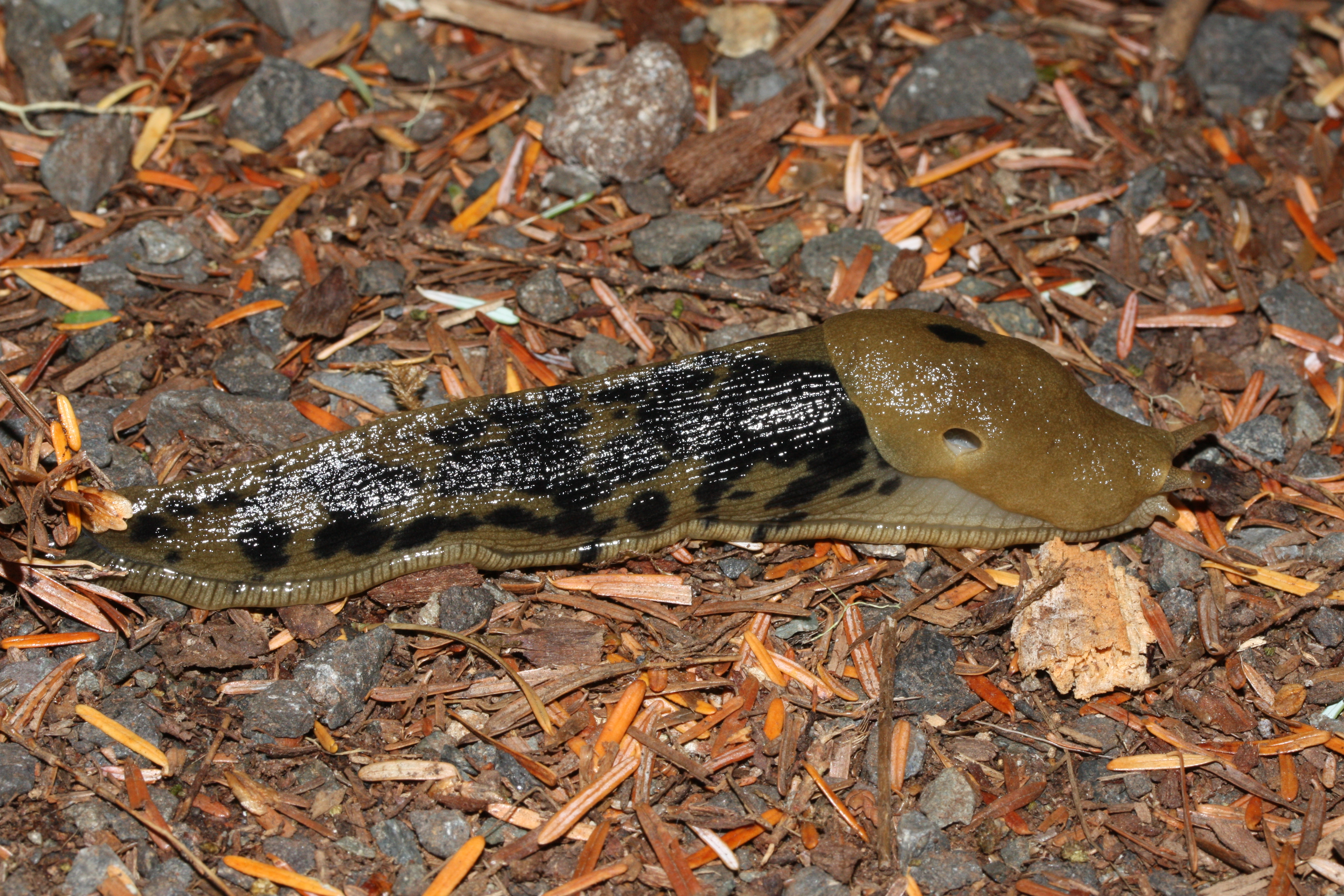
This individual Ariolimax columbianus has numerous black spots. The patterning may be so extensive as to make the animal look almost solid black. Banana slugs have a single lung which opens externally via a pneumostome. The placement of the pneumostome on the mantle helps to distinguish the species of Ariolimax.

The slime also contains pheromones to attract other slugs for mating. Slugs are simultaneous hermaphrodites, and reproduce by exchanging sperm with their mate. They produce up to 75 translucent eggs, which are laid in a log or on leaves. Slugs mate and lay eggs throughout the year. The adults provide no further care for their eggs beyond finding a suitable hiding spot, and the eggs are abandoned as soon as the clutch is laid.

== Distribution ==
Ariolimax columbianus is native to the forest floors along North America's Pacific coastal coniferous rainforest belt (including douglas-fir forests and redwood forests) which stretches from Southeastern Alaska to Santa Cruz, California.

Several discontinuous populations also occur in forested slopes of the coastal and transverse mountain ranges south of Santa Cruz as far south as Ventura County, with a tiny, isolated population located in Palomar Mountain State Park within the Palomar Mountain Range in San Diego County, California. The Palomar Mountains have lush Sierra Nevada-like coniferous forests and black oak woodlands unlike the surrounding semiarid lands of inland San Diego County and mark the southernmost population of banana slugs.

Small, isolated populations also occur east of the Pacific Coast such as in the inland coniferous rainforests of British Columbia's Columbia Mountains (interior wet-belt), just west of the Canadian Rockies, and have been seen at lower elevations near creeks and damp areas of Mount Revelstoke National Park. Small populations of banana slugs have also been seen along creek and damp areas of the western slopes of the Sierra Nevada mountains to the north of Yosemite National Park in California. Slug densities in these outlying areas in the Columbia Mountains, Sierra Nevada Mountains, and areas south of Santa Cruz are low compared to densities in the coastal coniferous rainforest belt and are rather restricted to damp areas near creeks, ravines, and gullies. This population may also be a relic from the Pleistocene epoch.

== Ecology ==
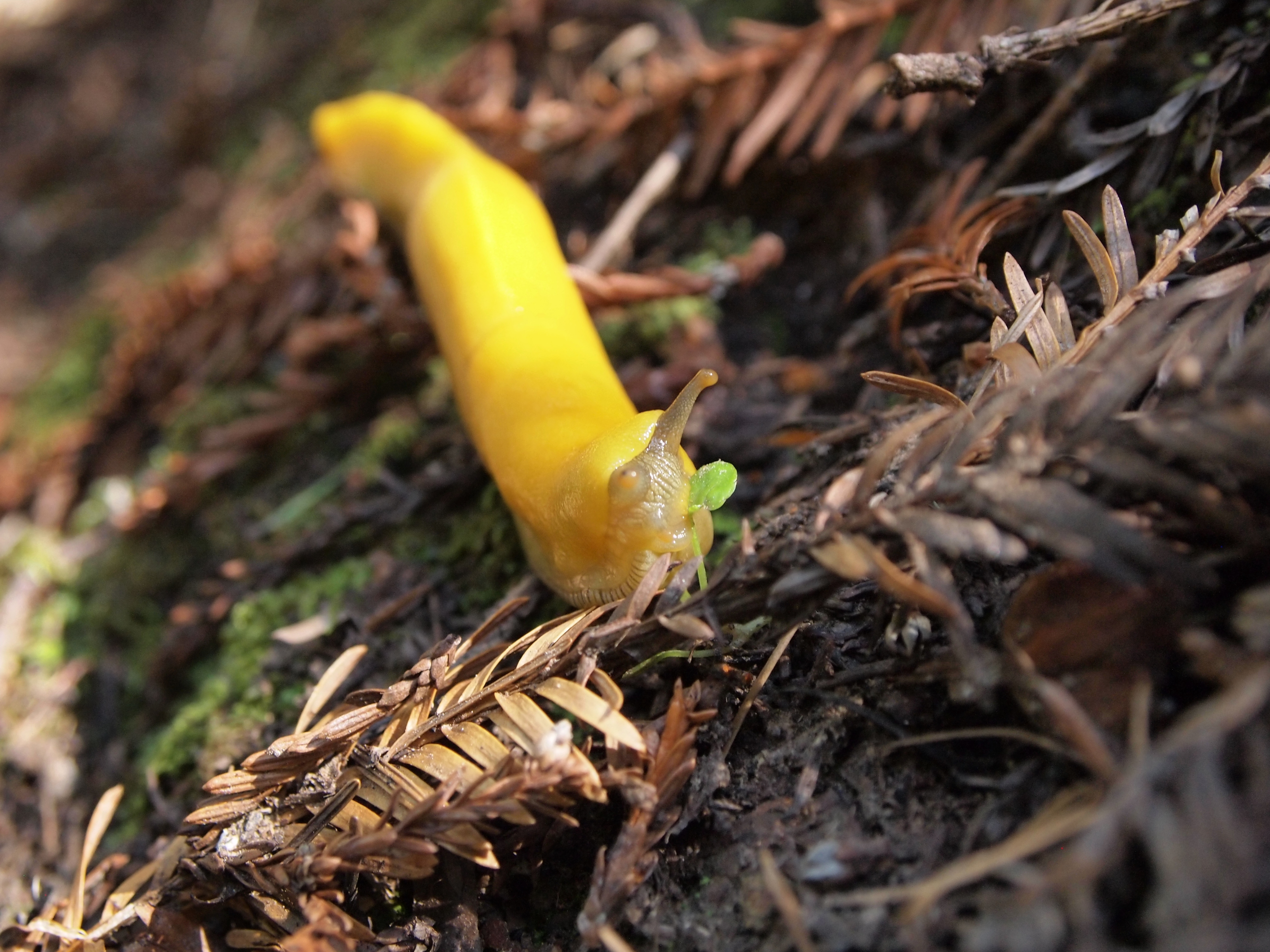
A banana slug eating a small plant in Big Basin Redwoods State Park

Banana slugs are detritivores, or decomposers. They consume leaves, animal droppings, moss, and dead plant material, and then recycle them into soil humus. They are generalist feeders, though they exhibit a preference for certain mushrooms. Through their consumption of various plant matter and animal excretion, banana slugs acts as agents of seed dispersal. They spread seeds and spores, and excrete a nitrogen-rich fertilizer. Additionally, by consuming dead organic matter, they contribute to decomposition and the nutrient cycles and are an important aspect of the ecosystem.

Small mammals, snakes, and salamanders sometimes eat banana slugs.

== Slime ==
The mucus secreted by banana slugs contains chemicals that can numb the tongue of predators. This mucus can absorb up to 100 times its volume in water. Technically, this slime is neither liquid nor solid, but rather a liquid crystal substance. Slug slime bears a resemblance to human mucus, primarily composed of proteins known as mucins. Upon contact with environmental moisture, dry mucin granules swell dramatically, expanding to hundreds of times their original volume. This expansion contributes to the slimy texture but does not involve the numbing effect seen in banana slugs. Moreover, the slime serves the purpose of maintaining moisture on the skin of the slug, akin to fruit, which facilitates gas exchange to support respiration. The glycoprotein-based mucous behaves as a liquid crystal, occupying a unique state between a solid and a liquid. Its molecular dispersion prevents it from being a true liquid, yet it lacks the compactness of a solid, displaying an organized, crystal-like pattern.

This mucous secretion serves a multitude of purposes in the life of a banana slug. It aids in locomotion, allowing them to glide gracefully across the forest floor. The slime also serves as a protective barrier, acting as a deterrent against potential predators and pathogens. Additionally, banana slug slime plays a role in reproduction, as slugs deposit chemical cues within the slime to attract potential mates. The slime's vivid yellow color, which is responsible for their common name, not only adds to their eccentric appearance but also acts as a warning signal to potential predators that it may not be a tasty meal. Banana slug mucus has potential to carry mites and other parasitic organisms.

== Reproduction ==
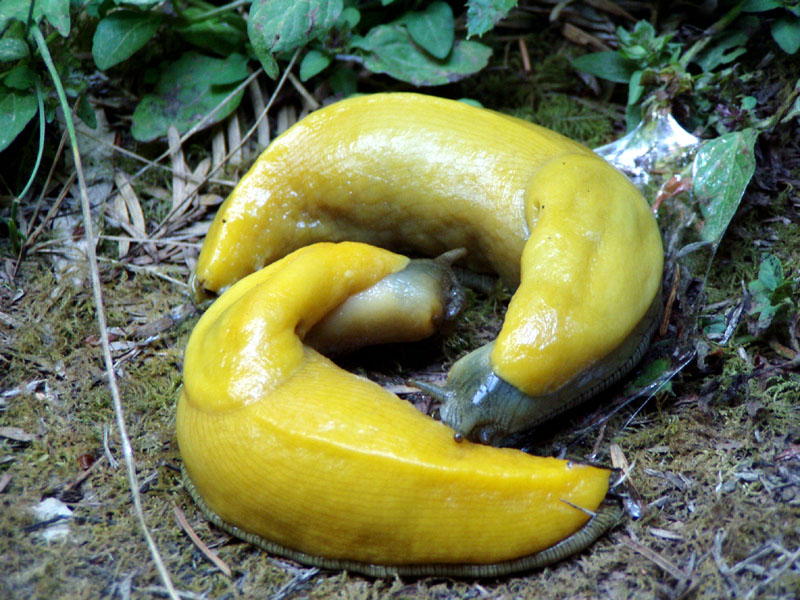
The mating dance of two banana slugs

Banana slugs are hermaphroditic, possessing both male and female reproductive organs. This feature allows them to mate as either sex or even fertilize themselves. The versatile slime also plays a role in their mating rituals. During the mating phase, banana slugs release pheromones through their adhesive trails to attract potential partners. Due to a slug's ability for self-fertilization, there is a high degree of homozygosity. Notably, their courtship process can be quite robust and, in certain species, may culminate in apophallation. During the mating ritual between two slugs, they both engage in a dance-like action where they will circle each other, occasionally lunging, nipping, and tail whipping. University of California, Santa Cruz research associate Janet Leonard notes that apophallation occurs some time after copulation, and the process of chewing takes around 45 minutes, but can take longer. After mating, the slugs separate and seek a sheltered location to lay their eggs. An impregnated slug will typically lay a range of 3 to 50 eggs in a small crevice. These eggs will typically hatch within a month or two, and the young slugs will mature over several months. Their offspring will typically have a pale white hue and as they grow acquire their distinct yellow color.

== In culture ==
Banana slugs have been used as food by Yurok Natives of the North Coast and by German immigrants in the 19th and early 20th centuries. A yearly festival and contest is held at Russian River including slug races and a contest for recipes – though, even when fed corn meal to purge them or soaked in vinegar to remove slime, the slugs' flavor is not always well regarded for the modern palate, and the most successful entries are often those in which the flavor is unnoticeable.

The banana slug (specifically Ariolimax dolichophallus, which is the most common banana slug on campus) is the mascot of the University of California, Santa Cruz. It is common in local forests, was approved by a student vote, and was named the best college mascot by Reader's Digest in 2004. The Every Little Thing podcast also dedicated half an episode to discussing the banana slug and its historical relevance to the UCSC. After celebrating 25 years of the establishment of the banana slug as UCSC's mascot, on September 27, 2011, the Santa Cruz City Council declared that day as the official "Day of the UC Santa Cruz Banana Slug." One T-shirt caption was: "No known predators!".

On September 27, 2024, Governor Gavin Newsom signed AB 1850, making the banana slug the official state slug of California.
