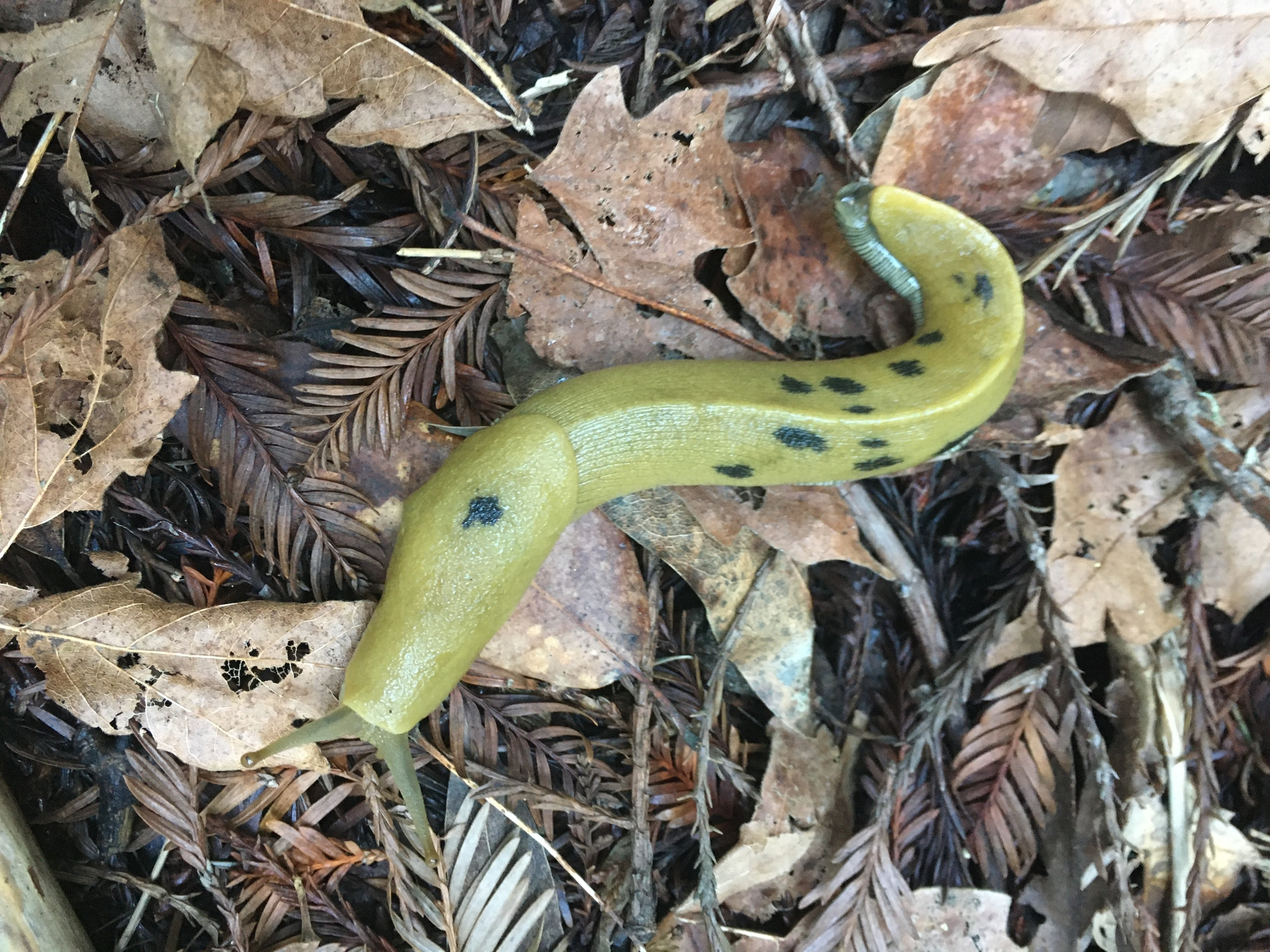

Conservation status
- Imperiled (NatureServe)

Scientific classification
- Kingdom: Animalia
- Phylum: Mollusca
- Class: Gastropoda
- Order: Stylommatophora
- Family: Ariolimacidae
- Genus: Ariolimax
- Species: A. buttoni

Binomial name
- Ariolimax buttoni (Pilsbry and Vanatta, 1896)

Synonyms
- Aphallarion buttoni Pilsbry & Vanatta, 1896; Ariolimax (Ariolimax) buttoni (Pilsbry & Vanatta, 1896)

= Ariolimax buttoni =

Species of slug

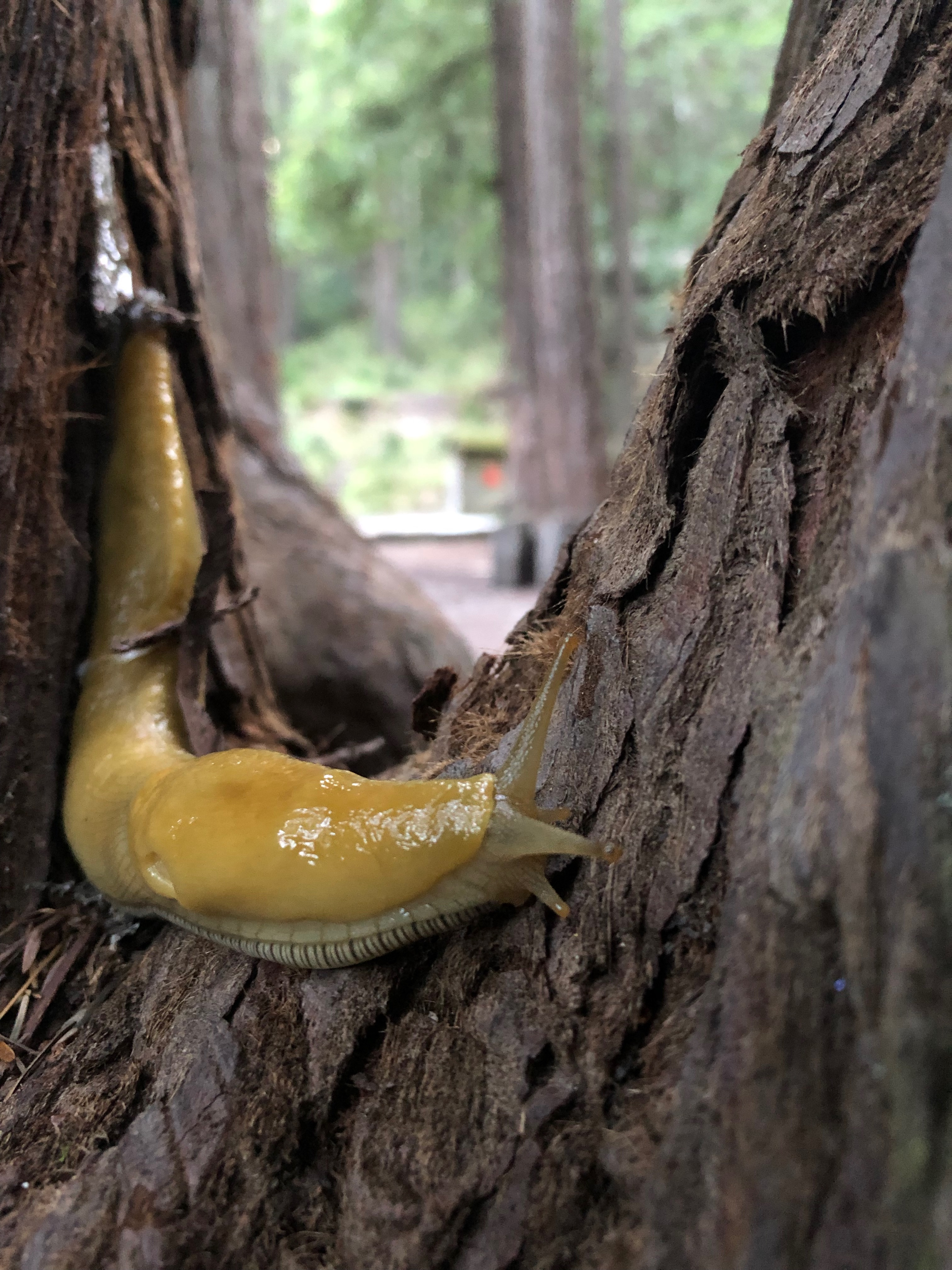
A. buttoni individual from Mendocino, CA

Ariolimax buttoni is a species of banana slug native to the West Coast of the United States. The species has a yellowish-tan hue that is similar to a banana and can be either spotted or unspotted.

== Digestion ==
A. buttoni are detritivores that eat dead organic matter. Like most mollusks, these slugs have a mouth on the bottom of their head with a jaw that enables them to break off smaller bits of food. Inside their mouth, they have a tongue called a radula that is covered in microscopic teeth to help further break down the food. Once the nutrients have been broken down and absorbed, the slug excretes packaged waste through the anus located on the side of its head.

== Breathing ==
Like other banana slugs, A. buttoni has a single lung that aids in gas exchange. To aid in this process the slug has a pneumostome, a small opening in the head that can close or open depending on the slug's oxygen and water levels.

== Reproduction ==
Banana slugs are hermaphroditic, meaning they are both male and female at the same time. During reproduction, A. buttoni engages in apophallation – the behavior in which a slug chews off its mating partner's penis. Their mating season lasts from February to early September. Copulation itself is long. One study reported that on average the mating process lasted up to seven hours with extreme cases continuing for 23. Since the slugs are hermaphroditic, a slug acting as a female inverts its penis to allow sexual reproduction. However, cross-fertilization is not always necessary. A. buttoni can produce viable offspring with high rates of hatching success through uniparental reproduction.

== Movement ==
A, buttoni moves via a foot on their underside that contracts and relaxes. In addition, they can glide over surfaces by producing a slime layer that aids in combating friction.

== Life cycle ==
A. buttoni lives around 30 months. They reach sexual maturity at about one year and lay eggs in the fall or winter. It has been observed that A. buttoni begins to copulate at as little as 8 months of life.

== Defense ==
A. buttoni has no shell to protect them and their bright color makes them an easy target. However, their slime deters predators. The mucus coating on their skin is toxic and numbs the mouth of organisms that ingest it. In addition, the thick, sticky slime slows and traps predators from catching up to the slug.
