= Apophallation =

Biting off of the penis

Apophallation is the biting off of the penis, known to occur in terrestrial slugs, which are hermaphroditic gastropod mollusks. It has been reported in some species of banana slugs, Ariolimax, and in the distantly related Deroceras laeve.

In the mating of banana slugs, the penis is inserted into the body of the partner. The penis may become trapped, perhaps because of the action of a special muscle, in which case the penis is gnawed off by either the partner or the owner. The apophallated slug can continue to mate as a female. It has been proposed that it might be adaptive for a slug to apophallate the mating partner because that partner is subsequently prevented from mating as a male and so might increase the allocation of resources to the production of eggs fertilised from the mating.

One paper reports that individuals of Deroceras laeve sometimes bite off their own penis after mating, which is then eaten by the partner. In this genus, sperm is swapped from penis to penis, so the amputee would not be able to mate successfully even in the female role.
