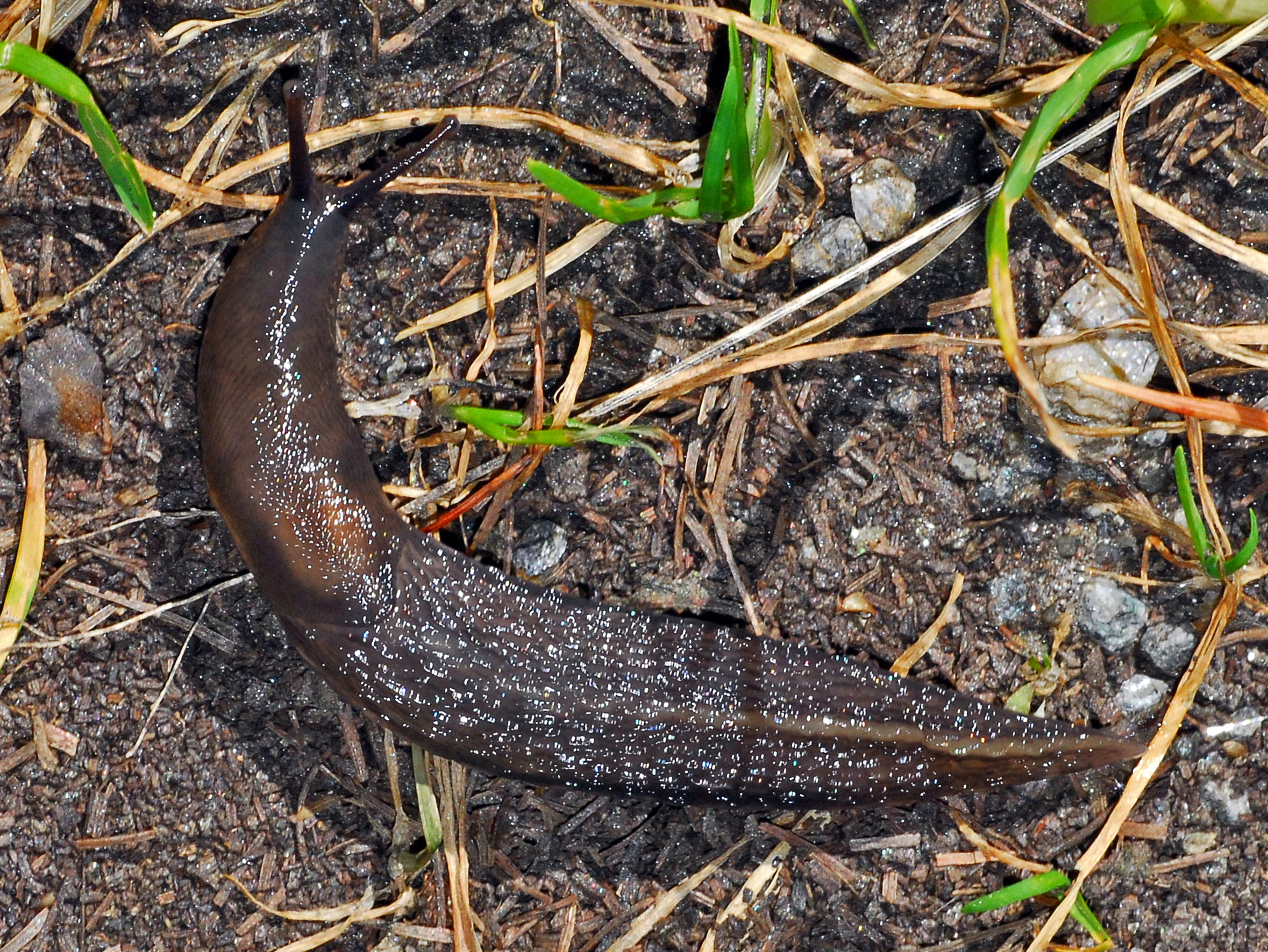
- Juvenile of Limax cf. luctuosus

Scientific classification
- Domain: Eukaryota
- Kingdom: Animalia
- Phylum: Mollusca
- Class: Gastropoda
- Order: Stylommatophora
- Family: Limacidae
- Genus: Limax
- Species: L. luctuosus

Binomial name
- Limax luctuosus Moquin-Tandon, 1855

= Limax luctuosus =

Species of gastropod

Limax luctuosus is a species of air-breathing land slug, a terrestrial pulmonate gastropod mollusk in the family Limacidae, the keelback slugs.

== Taxonomy ==
The taxon was first described by Alfred Moquin-Tandon in 1855 as a variety of Limax maximus. It could be a form of Limax cinereoniger or an endemic species.

== Distribution ==
Limax luctuosus was described from France, but it should also be present in the western Alps.
