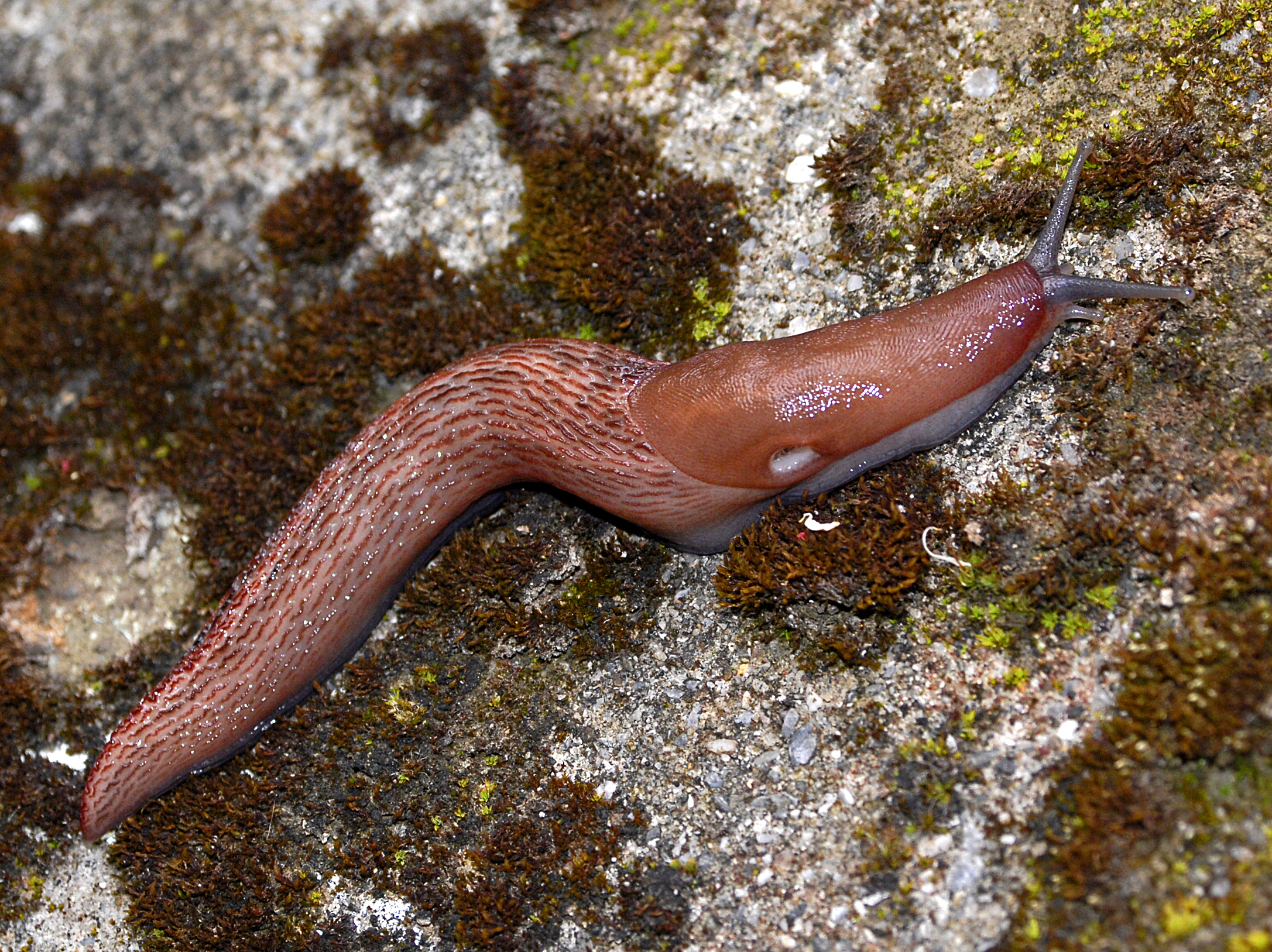
- A live Limax cf. dacampi

Conservation status
- Least Concern (IUCN 3.1)

Scientific classification
- Kingdom: Animalia
- Phylum: Mollusca
- Class: Gastropoda
- Order: Stylommatophora
- Family: Limacidae
- Genus: Limax
- Species: L. dacampi

Binomial name
- Limax dacampi Menegazzi, 1854

= Limax dacampi =

Species of gastropod

Limax dacampi (by other authors Limax dacampoi) is a species of air-breathing land slug, a terrestrial pulmonate gastropod mollusk in the family Limacidae, the keelback slugs.

== Etymology ==
Luigi Menegazzi named this species in honor of the malacologist Benedetto Da Campo.

== Taxonomy ==
For the time being, this is a problematic taxon; it may be a complex of closely related species. Limax dacampi is definitely not a synonym of Limax cinereoniger or Limax maximus; it is a separate species. This species was recently again found at the type locality near Garda (VR) (Lake Garda, Italy) and the copulatory behavior has been documented. The copulation of Limax dacampi is broadly similar to that of Limax maximus, but shows its own distinctive characteristics.

== Description ==
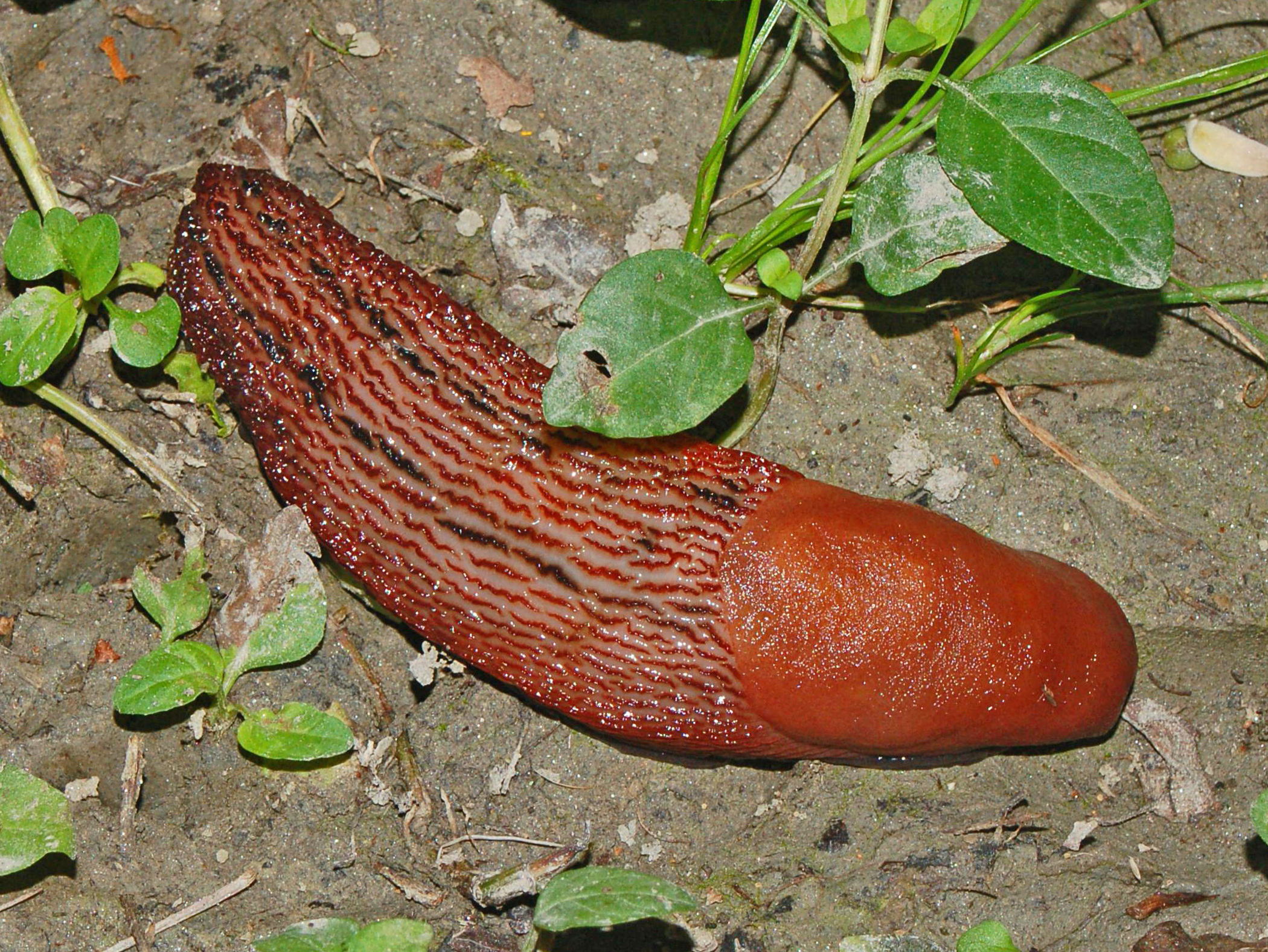
A live individual of Limax cf. dacampi

Limax dacampi reaches a length of about 20 centimetres (7.9 in). The body is reddish with two dark bands along the sides or dark spots on the back, excluding the mantle. The head and tentacles are grayish. The sole is light-colored.

== Distribution ==
This species is known to occur in the northern Italian mainland and in southern Switzerland.

== Habitat ==
The species is found in a variety of habitats. It prefers moist and shady forests and bushland.

== Subspecies and varieties ==
The species has been divided into several subspecies and numerous varieties. Some of these subspecies and varieties may be distinct species (or subspecies) within the species complex Limax dacampi.

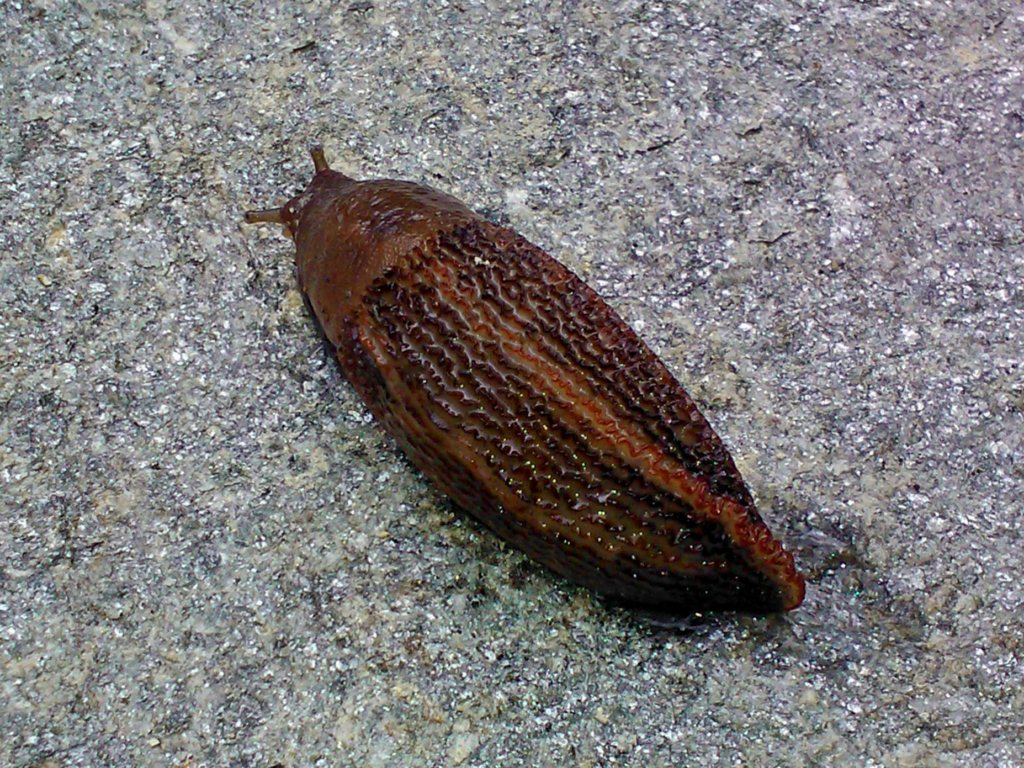
A dorsal view of a live Limax cf. dacampi

- Limax dacampi menegazzii Lessona & Pollonera
  - Limax dacampi menegazzii var. amaliaeBettoni
  - Limax dacampi menegazzii var. punctatus Lessona
- Limax dacampi renieri Lessona & Pollonera
  - Limax dacampi renieri var. atratus Bettoni
  - Limax dacampi renieri var. elegans Bettoni
  - Limax dacampi renieri var.sordellii Bettoni
  - Limax dacampi renieri var. nigricans Lessona
  - Limax dacampi renieri var. sulphureus Lessona
  - Limax dacampi renieri var. calderinii Lessona
- Limax dacampi dacampi Menegazzi
  - Limax dacampi dacampi var. typus Bettoni
  - Limax dacampi dacampi var. trilineolatus Bettoni
  - Limax dacampi dacampi var. monolineatus Bettoni
  - Limax dacampi dacampi var. pinii Lessona & Pollonera
  - Limax dacampi dacampi var. fuscus Bettoni
  - Limax dacampi dacampi var. taccanii Pini
  - Limax dacampi dacampi var. gualterii Pini
  - Limax dacampi dacampi var. maculatus Lessona
  - Limax dacampi dacampi var. pallescens Lessona
  - Limax dacampi dacampi var. rufescens Lessona
  - Limax dacampi dacampi var. monocromus Lessona & Pollonera
  - Limax dacampi dacampi var. villae Pini
  - Limax dacampi dacampi var. turatii Pini

== Bibliography ==
- de Betta, Edoardo (1870). I molluschi terrestri e fluviatili della provincia Veronese. A complemento della malacologia di L. Menegazzi (in Italian). Verona: Vicentini & Franchini – via Online Göttinger Digitalisierungszentrum.
- Bettoni, Eugenio (1871). "Sul Limax Da-Campi, note malacologiche". Bullettino Malacologico Italiano (in Italian). 3 (5). Pisa: 161–166, Taf. 3, 4 – via Online Biodiversity Heritage Library.
- Bourguignat, Jules René (1861). "Note sur divers limaciens nouveaux ou peu connus". Revue et Magasin de Zoologie pure et appliquée (in French). 2 (13). Paris: 251–263.
- Bourguignat, Jules René (1862). Les spiciléges malacologiques. Paris: Baillière – via Online Google Books.
- Lessona, Mario; Carlo Pollonera (1882). Monografia dei limacidi italiani (in Italian). Turin: Loescher – via Online Biodiversity Heritage Library.
- Menegazzi, Luigi (1855). "Malacologia veronese. Rapporto letto nella tornata del 14 settembre 1854". Memorie dell' Accademia d' Agricoltura Commercio ed Arti di Verona. 32. Verona: I–XIII, S.1-334, Taf. I-II – via Online GDZ.
- Manganelli, G.; Bodon, M.; Favilli, L.; Giusti, F. (1995). "Fascicolo 16. Gastropoda Pulmonata.". In Minelli A.; Ruffo, S.; La Posta, S. (eds.). Checklist delle specie della fauna italiana (in Italian). Bologna: Ed. Calderini. ISBN 88-7019-966-5.
