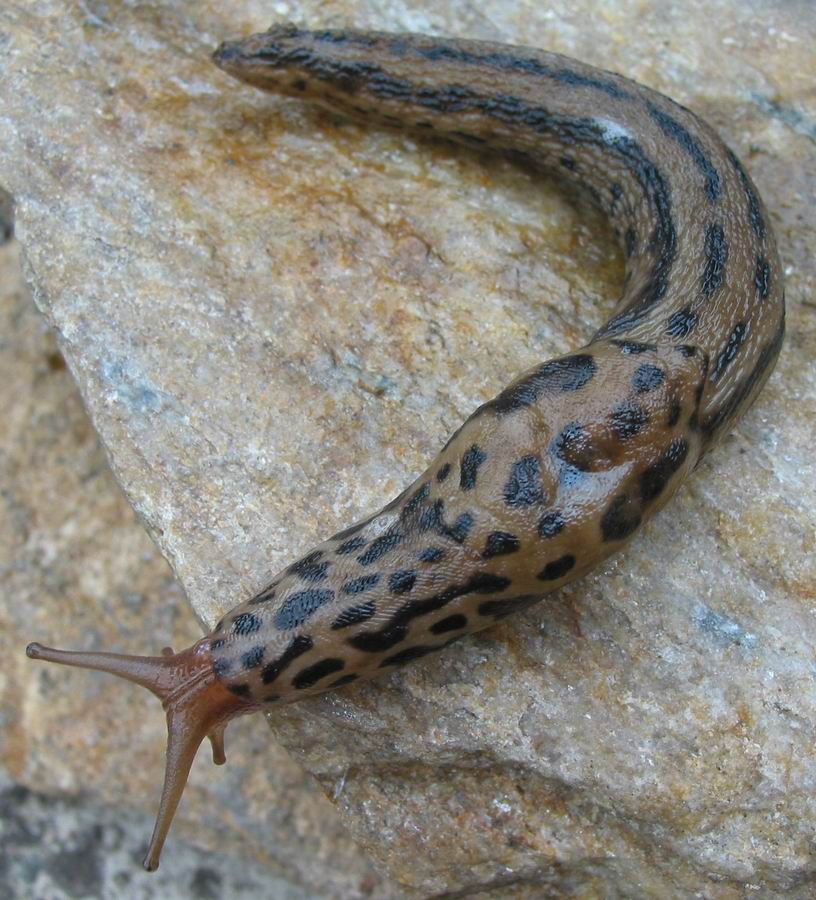

Conservation status
- Least Concern (IUCN 3.1)

- Secure (NatureServe)

Scientific classification
- Kingdom: Animalia
- Phylum: Mollusca
- Class: Gastropoda
- Order: Stylommatophora
- Family: Limacidae
- Genus: Limax
- Species: L. maximus

Binomial name
- Limax maximus Linnaeus, 1758

Synonyms
- Limax cinereus Lister, 1678; Limax cinereus O. F. Müller, 1774 (partim); Limacella parma Brard, 1815; Limax antiquorum Férussaac, 1819 (partim); Limax maculatus Nunneley, 1837 (non maculatus Kaleniczenko, 1851); Limax cellarius (d'Argenville) Lessona et Polonera, 1882; Limax carbonarius albanicus Jaeckel, 1954

= Limax maximus =

Species of slug

Limax maximus (literally, "biggest slug"), known by the common names great grey slug and leopard slug, is a species of slug in the family Limacidae, the keeled slugs. It is among the largest keeled slugs, Limax cinereoniger being the largest.

Limax maximus is the type species of the genus Limax. The adult slug measures 10–20 cm (3.9–7.9 in) in length and is generally a light grey or grey-brown with darker spots and blotches, although the coloration and exact patterning of the body of this slug species is quite variable.

This species has a very unusual and distinctive mating method, where the pair of slugs use a thick thread of mucus to hang suspended in the air from a tree branch or other structure.

Although native to Europe, this species has been accidentally introduced to many other parts of the world. It was first discovered outside its native range in Philadelphia, USA in 1867.

== Description ==
=== External anatomy ===
The adult body length is 10-20 cm (4-8 in).

The greater part of the body is rounded, but there is a short keel on its tail, with about 48 longitudinal rows of elongate, detached tubercles. The body color is pale-grey, ash-colored, brownish or sometimes yellowish-white. The body is longitudinally streaked or spotted with black. The pattern of spotting is variable. The shield is always black-spotted. The sole of the foot is a uniform ash or yellowish-ash color. The foot-fringe is pale, with a row of minute submarginal blackish tubercles.

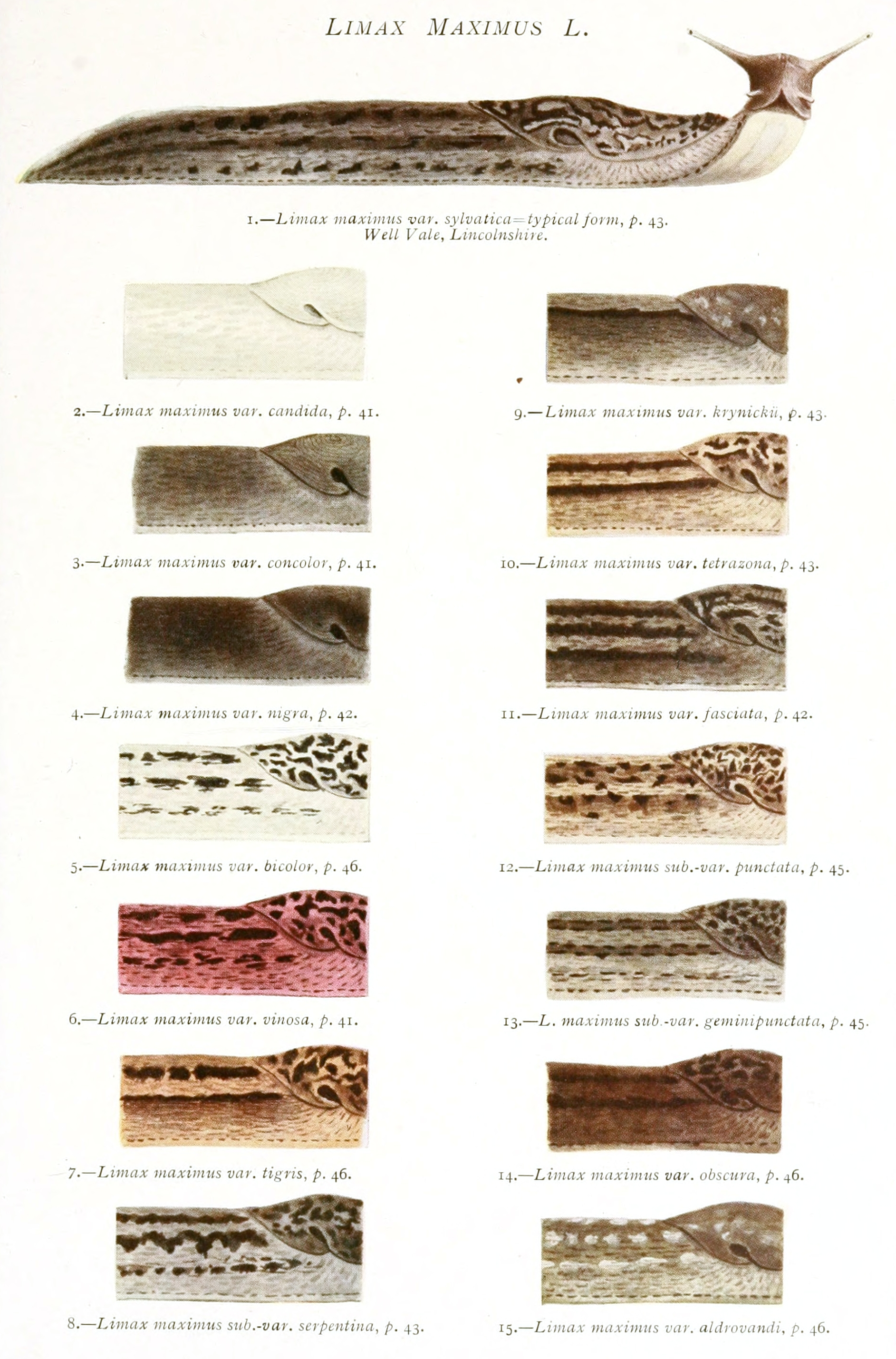
Drawing of color variability of Limax maximus

The tentacles are very long and slender. The reproductive pore is near the base of the right upper tentacle.

The shield is oblong, about one third of the total length of the animal. The shield is rounded in front, angular behind, and forming an angle of about 80 degrees when in motion, usually of a similar tint to the body, but boldly marbled or maculate with black, somewhat concentrically and interruptedly ridged around a sub-posterior nucleus.

The pneumostome is just posterior to the midpoint of the mantle, as it is in all Limacidae.

The mucus is colorless and iridescent, and not very adhesive.

Although color varieties have no actual taxonomic significance, a large number of color varieties have been described, prominent among them being the varieties serpentinus, vulgaris, cellarius (typical), johnstoni, maculatus, ferrussaci, obscurus, fasciatus and rufescens, of Alfred Moquin-Tandon, and cornaliee, of Pini.

=== Internal anatomy ===
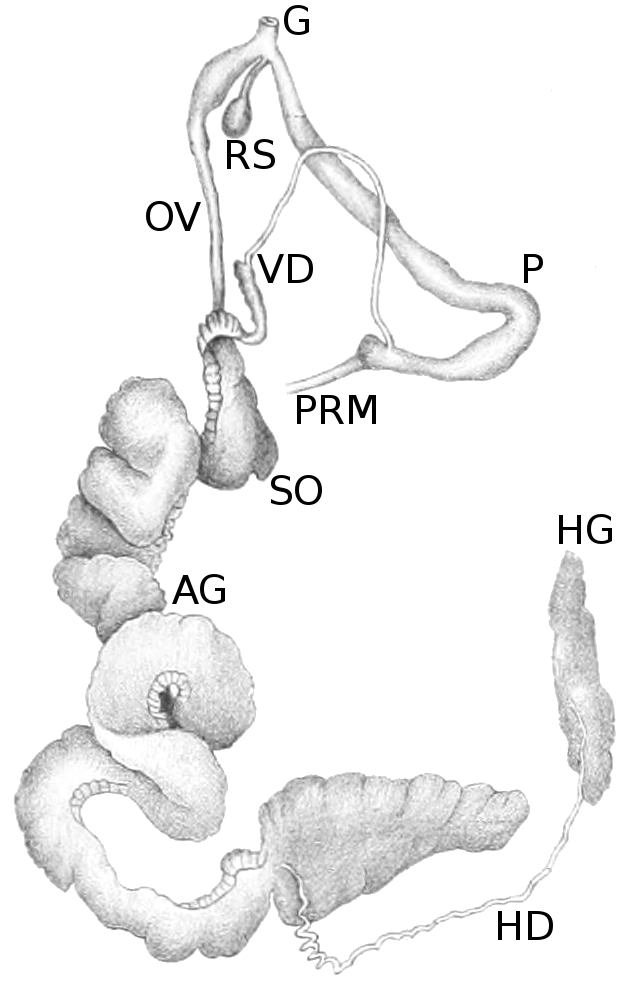
Reproductive system of Limax maximus: HG = hermaphrodite gland = ovotestis HD = hermaphrodite duct AG = albumen gland SO = spermoviduct OV = oviduct VD = vas deferens = sperm-duct RS = receptaculum seminis P = penis PRM = penis retractor muscle G = genital pore

The shell of Limax maximus is reduced and internal, under the shield. The occurrence of this internal shell was known to Pliny the Elder; the shell was used by the ancient physicians for the sake of its carbonate of lime.

The calcitic shell is situated beneath the hinder part of the shield, and is perceptible through the skin. The color of the shell is whitish. The shape of the shell is oblong-oval and thin, slightly convex above, and correspondingly concave beneath, with a membranous margin. The apex or nucleus is at the posterior margin but inclined towards the left side, and forming the apophysis by which the shell is organically attached to the animal. The length of the shell is 13 mm (1/2 in) and the width of the shell is 7 mm (1/4 in). Shells of different Limacidae species are undiagnostic: in other words, they are not helpful for identification purpose.

Digestive system: The formula of the radula is: 62-73/ × 138–157. The intestine has six convolutions and is without a caecum. Of the six convolutions of the intestine, four are imbedded in the liver, and two hang freely in the body cavity.

The nervous system is composed of the typical ganglia. The pedal ganglia are placed beneath the radula sac and joined by an anterior and a posterior commissure. The abdominal ganglion lies a little to the right of the median line. The visceral ganglia occupy the angle between the lingual sheath and the oesophagus and the buccal ganglia are widely separated but joined by a commissure nearly as thick as the ganglia themselves.

Reproductive system: The hermaphrodite gland (HG) is elongated and large, and is connected with spermoviduct (SO) by means of the hermaphrodite duct (HD) which takes its course through a portion of the albumen gland (AG). The spermoviduct is thick and well convoluted, and separates further down into a vas deferens or sperm-duct (VD) and an oviduct (OV). The former opens into the upper end of a very long penis (P), to which a strong retractor muscle (PRM) is attached. The lower portion of the penis unites with that of the oviduct at the genital orifice, so that there is no vestibule. The receptaculum seminis (RS) opens into the lower end of the penis near the junction of the two ducts.

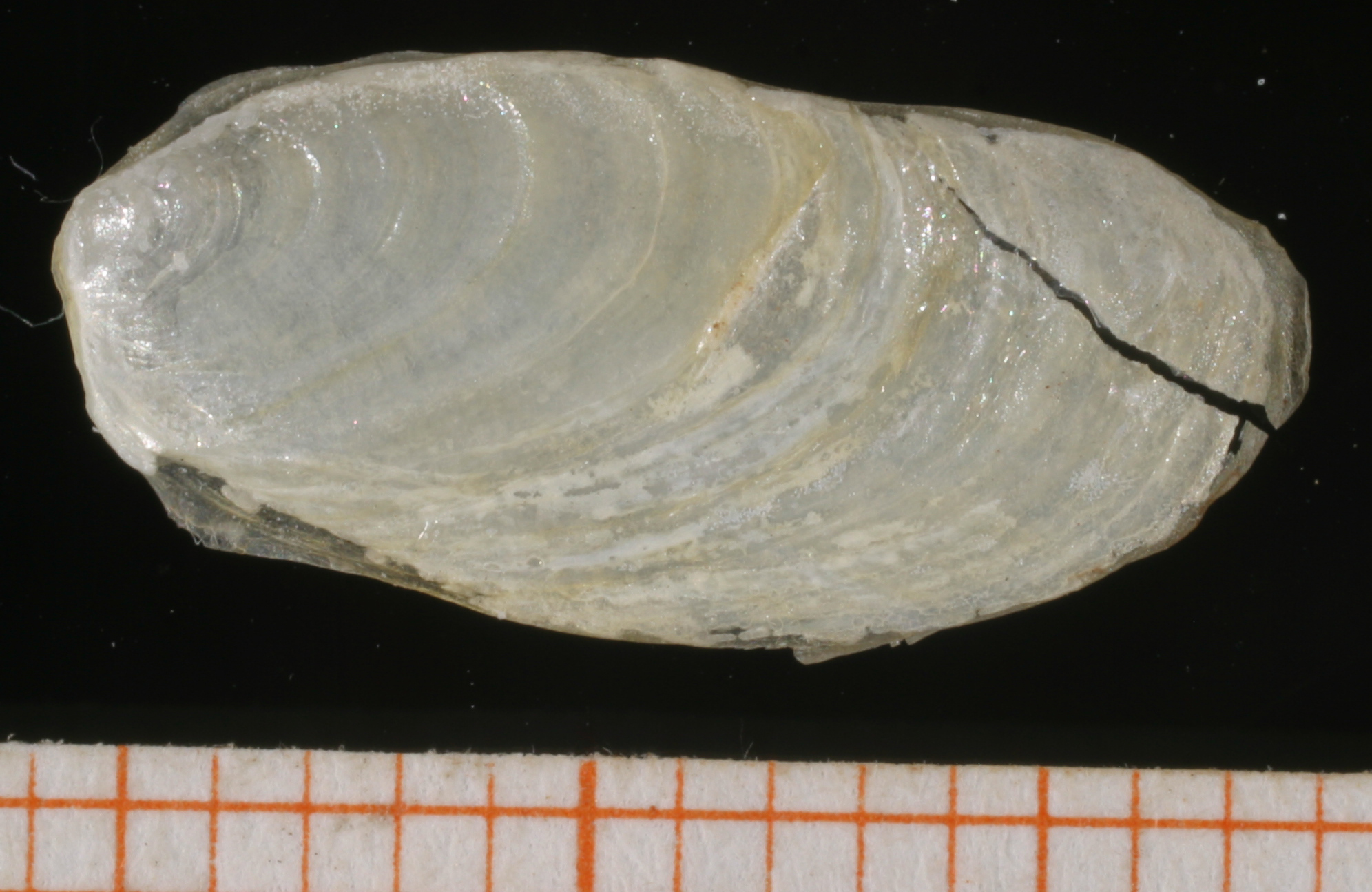
Internal shell, dorsal view. Scale bar is in mm.

== Distribution ==
=== Fossil distribution ===
The internal shells of the different species of Limacidae are not recognizable to the species level. Therefore, the fossil distribution of Limax maximus (and other Limacidae species) is unknown. Unidentified calcitic shells of Limacidae are known from European Tertiary and Quaternary deposits.

=== Indigenous distribution ===
This species is now widely distributed around the world, but it is generally considered to be native to Europe and Mediterranean countries of Africa.

Western Europe:

- Great Britain - Limax maximus was first described in England in Animalium Angliae Tres Tractatus … Alter de Cochleis tum Terrestribus tum Fluviatilibus by Martin Lister in 1678. The presence of Limax maximus in England had been noted twelve years earlier in Christopher Merret's Pinax Rerum Naturalium Britannicarum.
- Ireland
- Benelux: Belgium, Netherlands, Luxembourg
- France
- Germany
- Italy
- Switzerland
- Spain
- Portugal

Eastern Europe:

- Albania
- Bosnia-Hercegovina
- Bulgaria
- Croatia
- Greece
- Serbia

Africa:

- Egypt
- Algeria
- Morocco

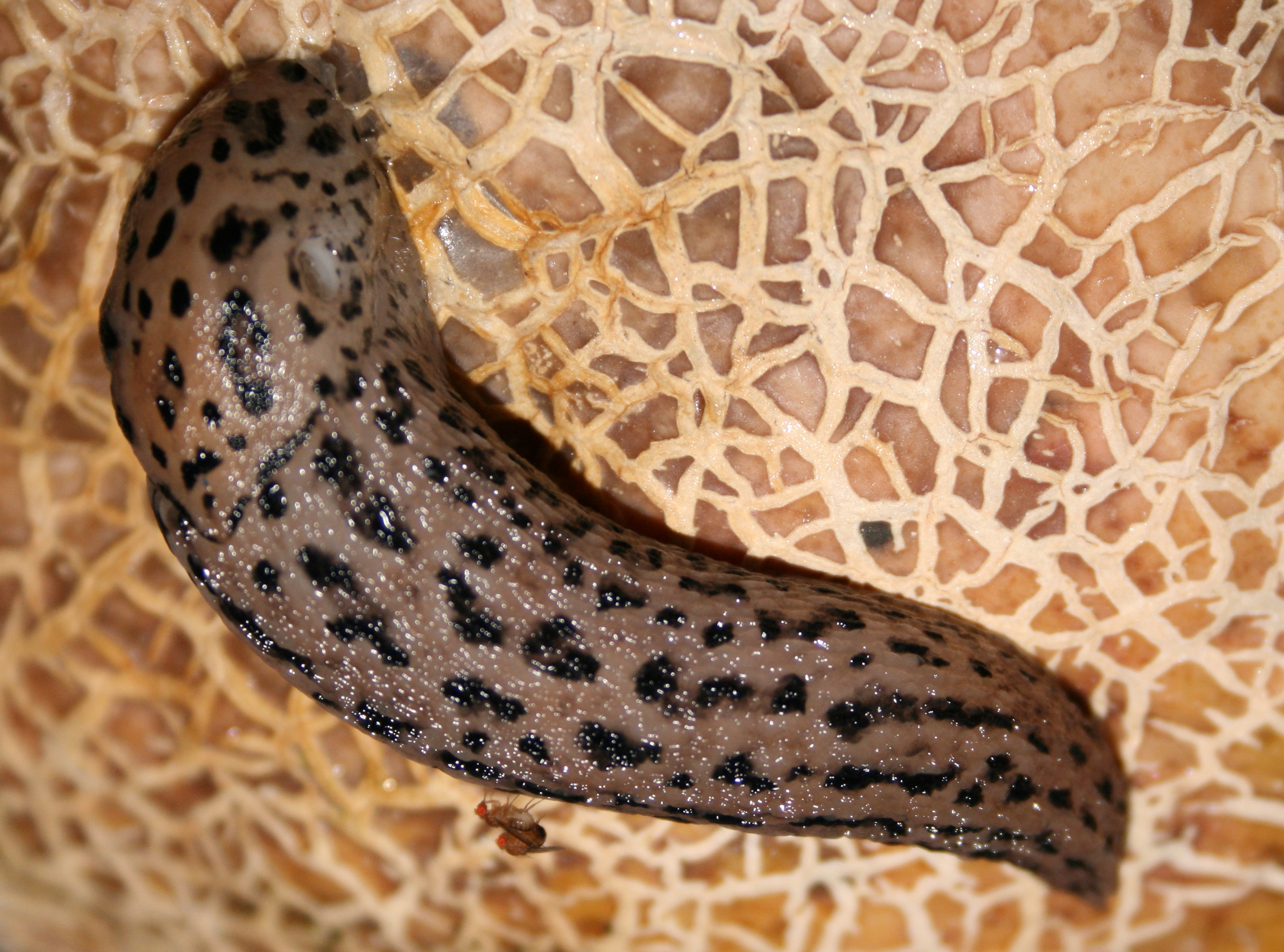
In a compost heap in New Jersey

=== Nonindigenous distribution ===
The non-indigenous distribution of Limax maximus includes many countries worldwide:

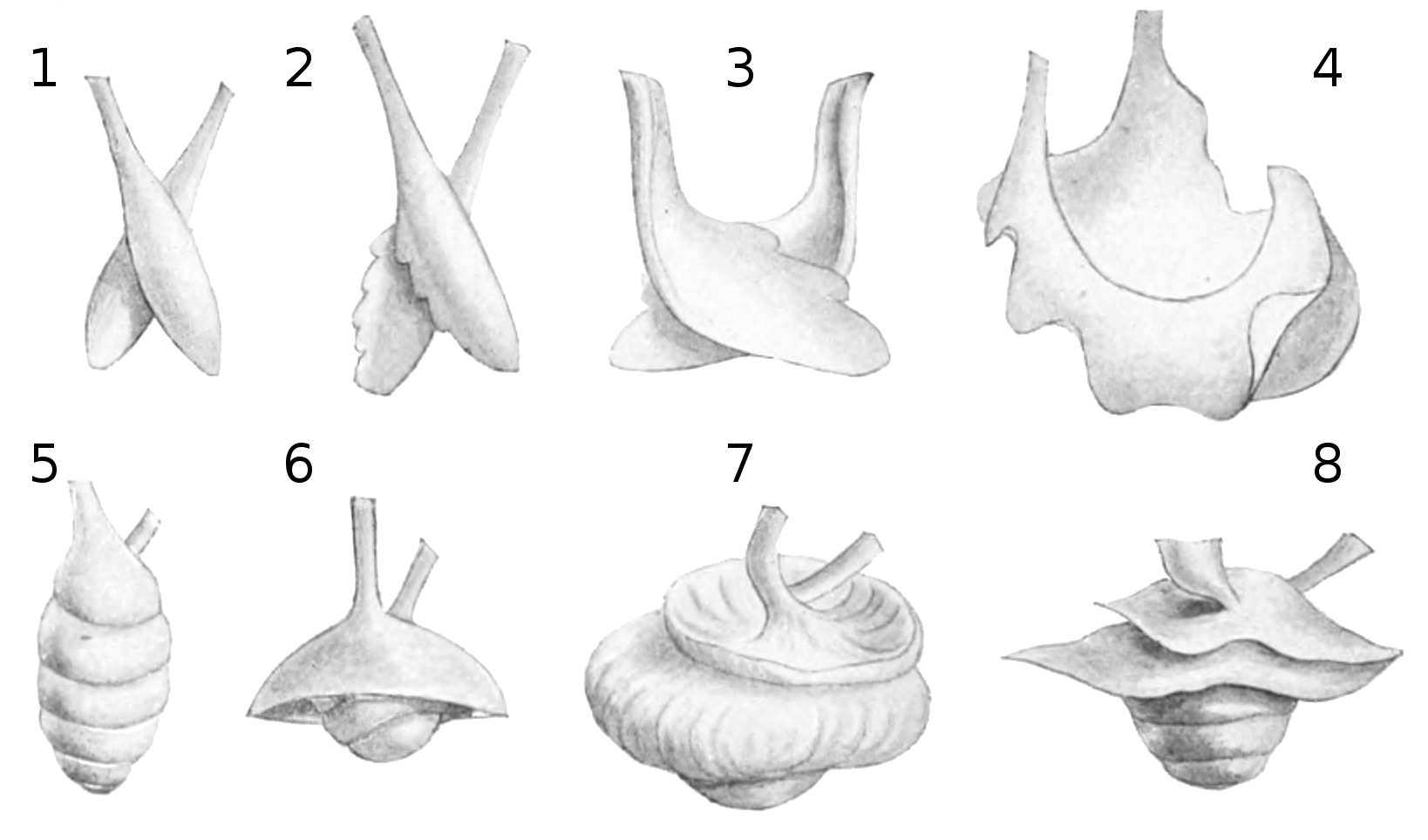
Penises of Limax maximus during mating. 1- penises after protrusion from the body. 2 - commencement of the appearance of the frill. 3 - frill partially unrolled. 4 - frill completely expanded, preparatory to twisting together. 5 - penises tightly coiled together, forming the whorled knot. 6 - the succeeding umbrella form. 7 - umbrella form with horizontal margins reversed. 8 - umbrella form with double margins.

Europe:

- all remaining countries not already listed above.

Africa

- Mozambique
- South Africa

North America:

- Canada (present in 5 of 10 provinces)
- Mexico
- United States (present in 46 of 50 states)

South America:

- Argentina
- Brazil
- Chile
- Colombia

Asia:

- China
- Japan
- India

Oceania:

- Australia
- New Zealand

== Behavior ==
Limax maximus is nocturnal, feeding at night. It is not very active or prolific. When alarmed, or at rest, this slug merely draws its head within the shield, but does not otherwise contract its body. When irritated, it is said to expand its shield.

The homing instinct is strongly developed in this species, which, after its nocturnal rambles or foraging expeditions, usually returns to the particular crevice or chink in which it has established itself.

Limax maximus is capable of associative learning, specifically classical conditioning, because it is capable of aversion learning and other types of learning. It can also detect deficiencies in a nutritionally incomplete diet if the essential amino acid methionine is experimentally removed from its food.

== Ecology ==
=== Habitat ===
This species is not gregarious. It frequents gardens, damp and shady hedgerows and woods, hiding during the day beneath stones, under fallen trees, or other obscure and damp places. It does, however, exhibit a decided preference for the vicinity of human habitations, and readily takes up its abode in damp cellars or outbuildings.

In Ireland, this predilection for human dwellings is not exhibited, and the species is restricted to woods and other similar places. It may even be met almost within a high-water mark on the seashore.

=== Feeding habits ===
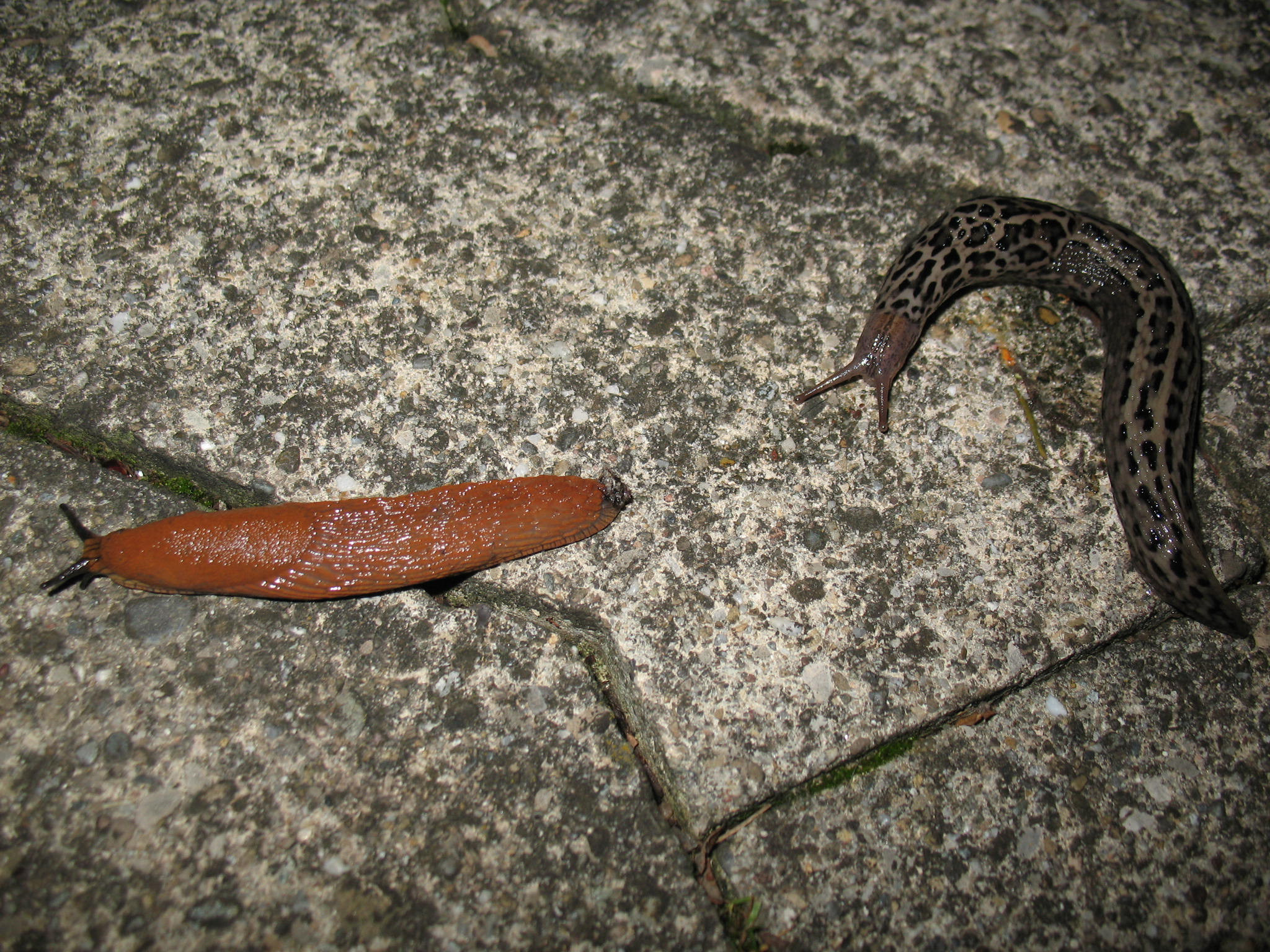
Leopard slug hunting Red slug (Arion rufus).

Limax maximus is omnivorous. It is a detrivore, cleaning up dead plants and fungi, and a carnivore known to pursue other slugs at a top speed of 15 centimetres (6 in) per minute. It is listed as a major agricultural pest by the Institute of Food and Agricultural Science Florida.

=== Life cycle ===
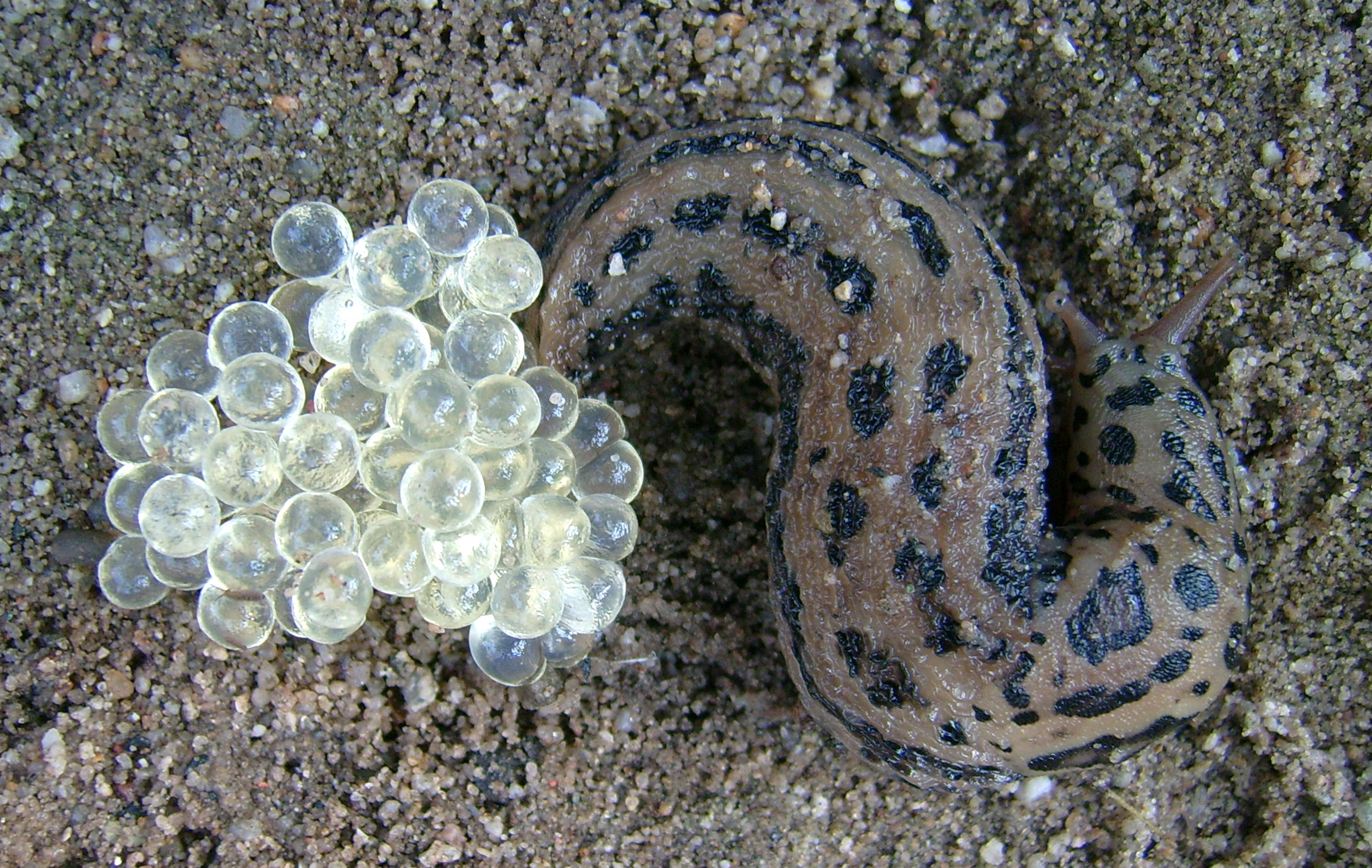
With egg cluster

The eggs of this slug are deposited in a cluster, slightly attached to each other. Eggs are transparent, elastic and slightly yellowish in color. The size of the egg is 6×4.5 mm. They hatch in about a month.

The tiny slugs which emerge from the eggs need at least two years to reach sexual maturity.

The lifespan of Limax maximus is 2.5–3 years.

==== Mating ====
Mating of Limax maximus filmed

The mating habits of Limax maximus are considered unusual among slugs: the hermaphrodite slugs court, usually for hours, by circling and licking each other. After this, the slugs will climb into a tree or other high area and then, entwined together, lower themselves on a thick string of mucus, evert their white translucent mating organs (penises) from their gonopores (openings on the right side of the head), entwine these organs, and exchange sperm. Both participants will later lay hundreds of eggs.

=== Parasites ===
Parasites of Limax maximus include the nematode Agfa flexilis, which lives in its salivary glands, the nematode Angiostoma limacis, which lives in its rectum, and Angiostrongylus costaricensis.

Like some other slugs, this species is often infested by the white parasitic slug mite Riccardoella limacum. This mite swarms its body and invades its respiratory cavity.

A meningitis-causing nematode, Angiostrongylus cantonensis, which normally infests the lungs of rats, has a larval stage which can only live in molluscs, including slugs. This nematode was once only known to be a problem in tropical areas, but it has since spread to other regions. Live slugs that are accidentally eaten with improperly cleaned vegetables, such as lettuce, or slugs which have been improperly cooked, can act as vectors for the parasite.

== Gallery ==
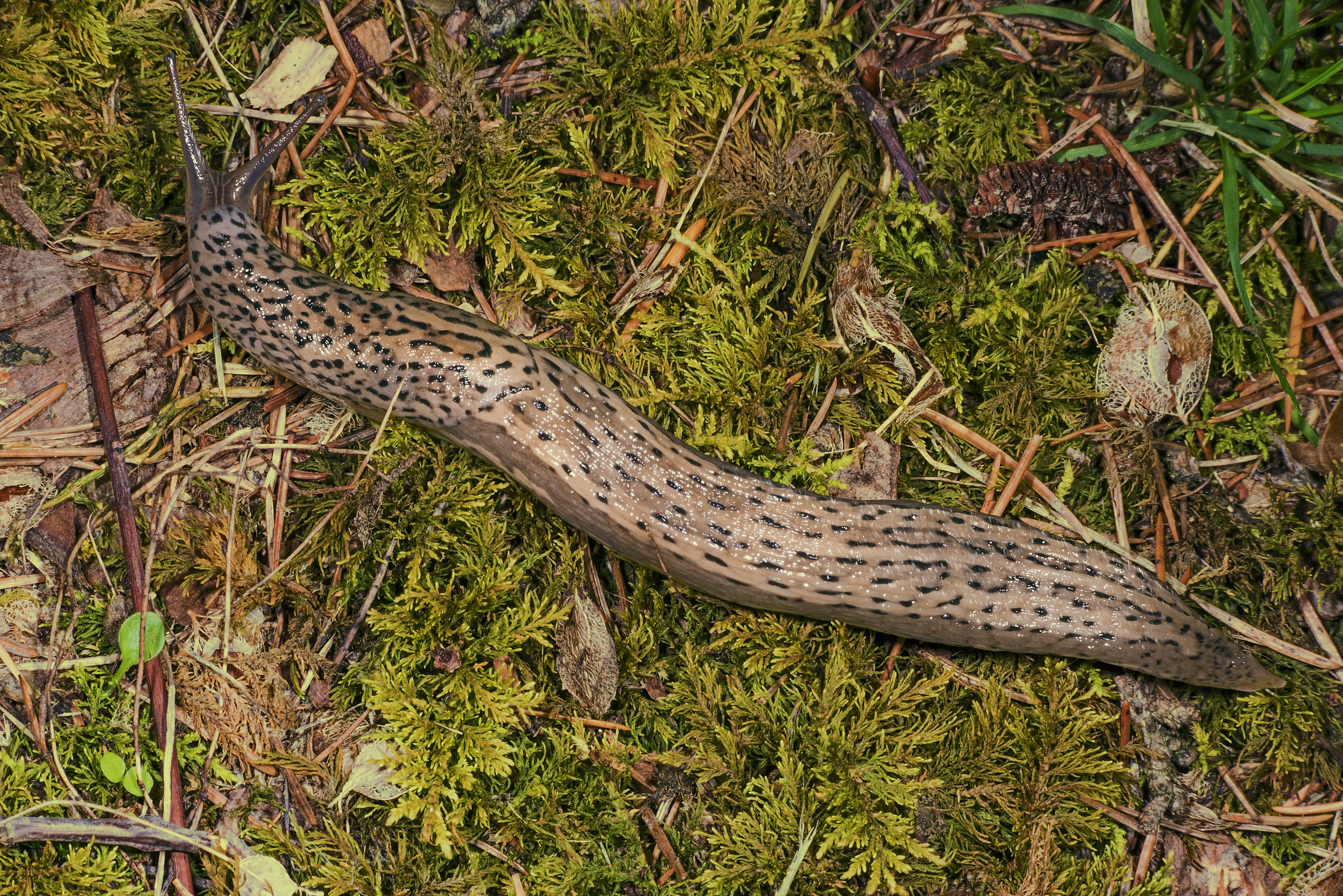
on a forest floor in France

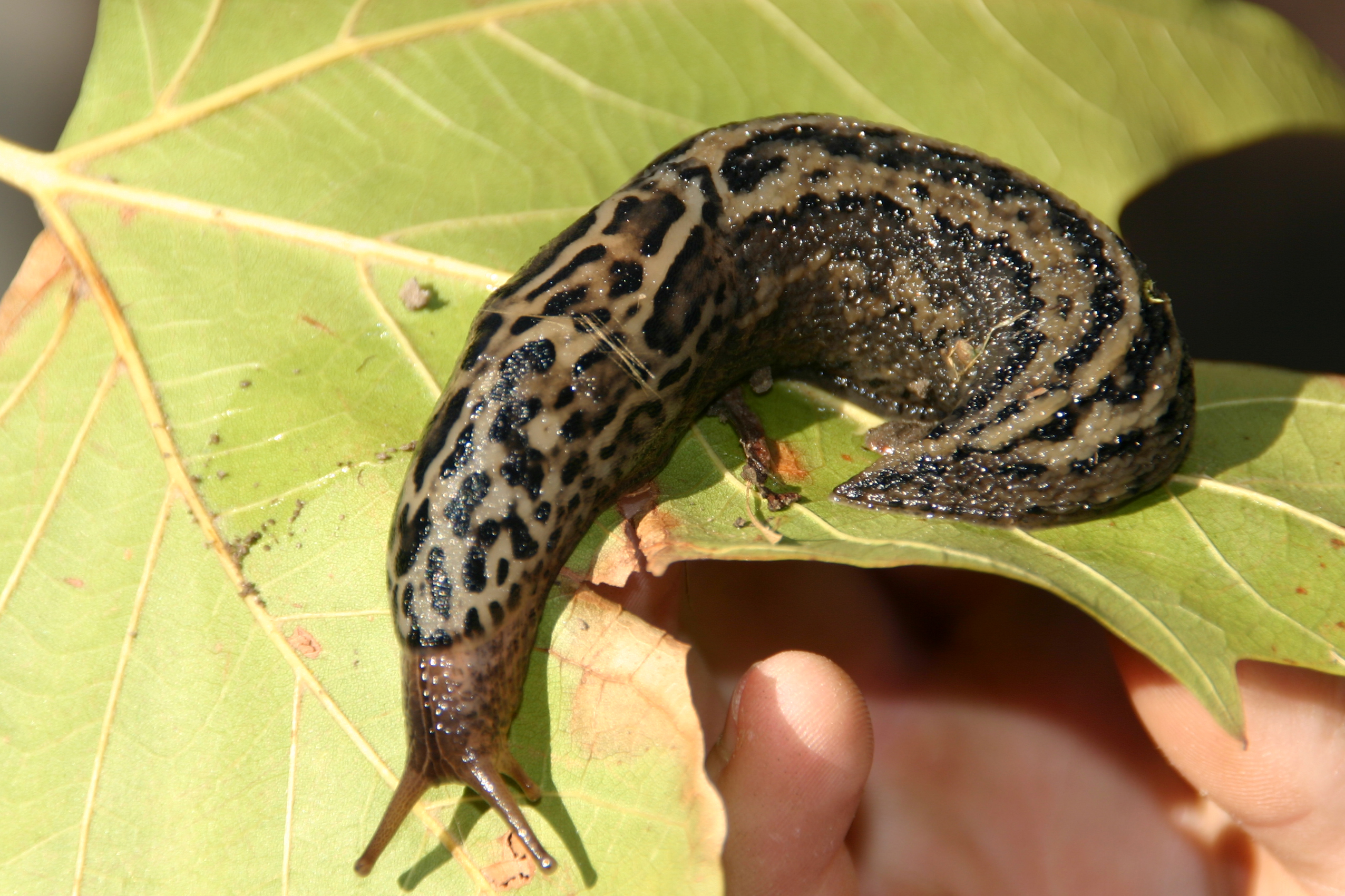
on a leaf in Germany

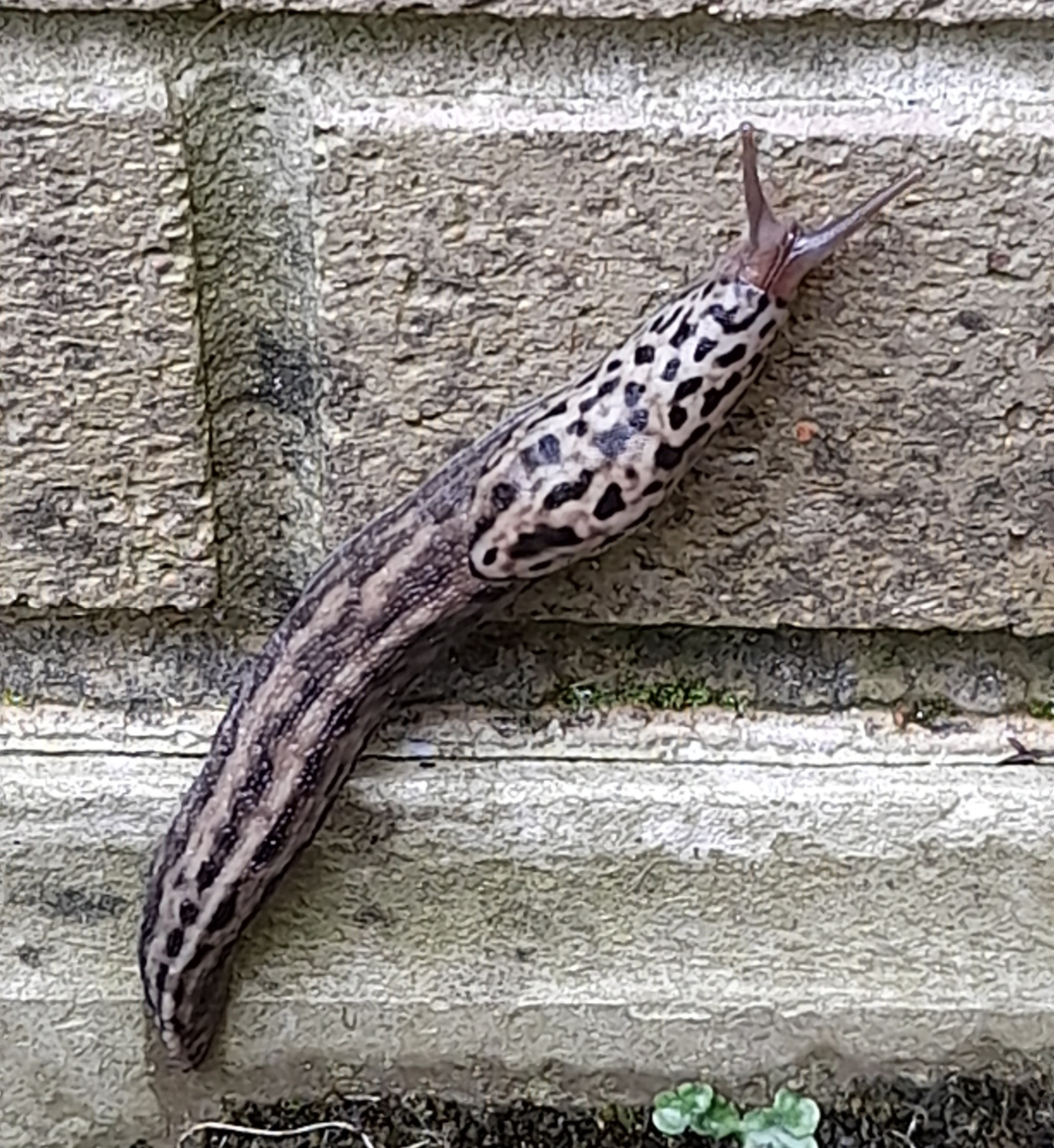
Canberra, Australia

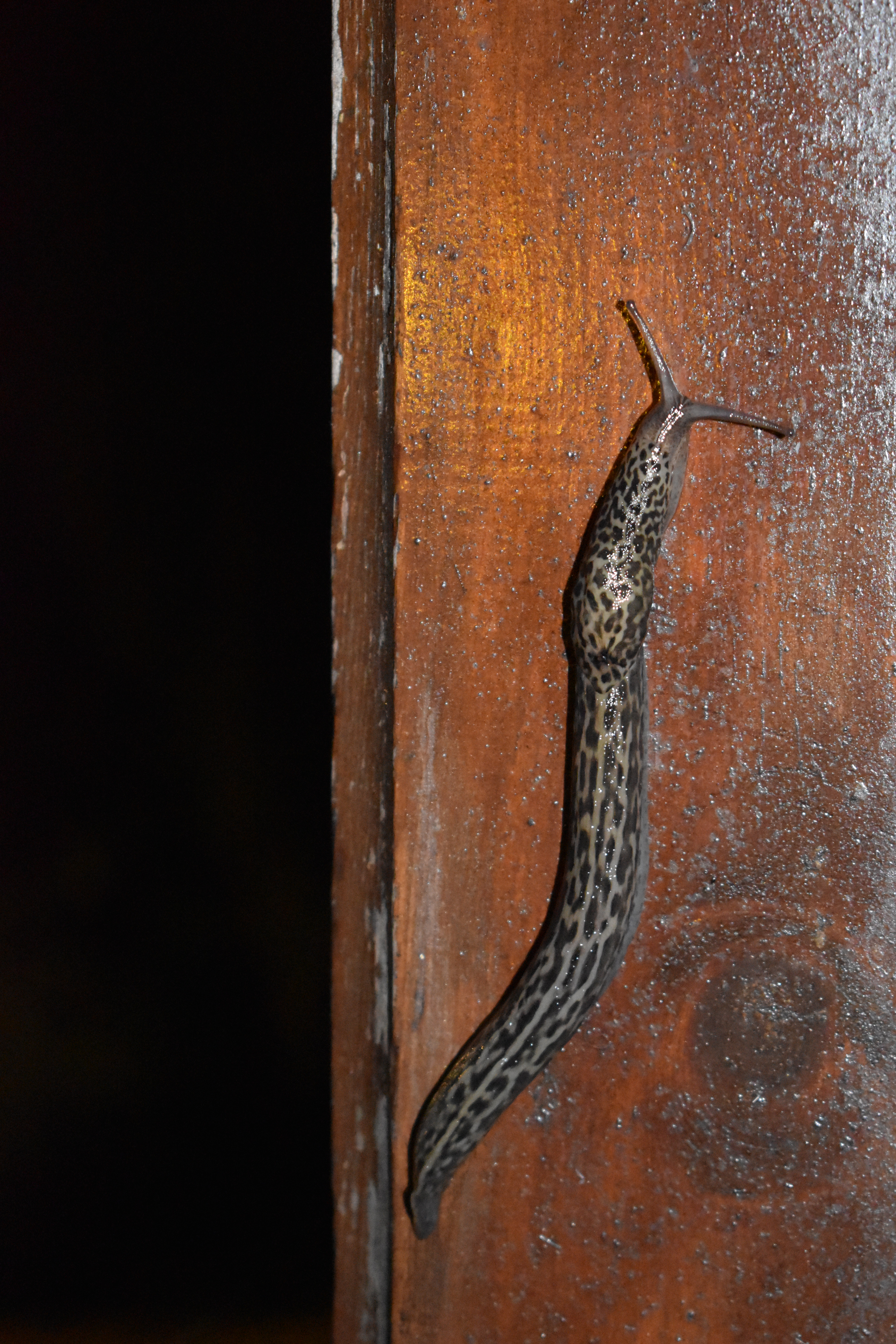
Asperö, Sweden

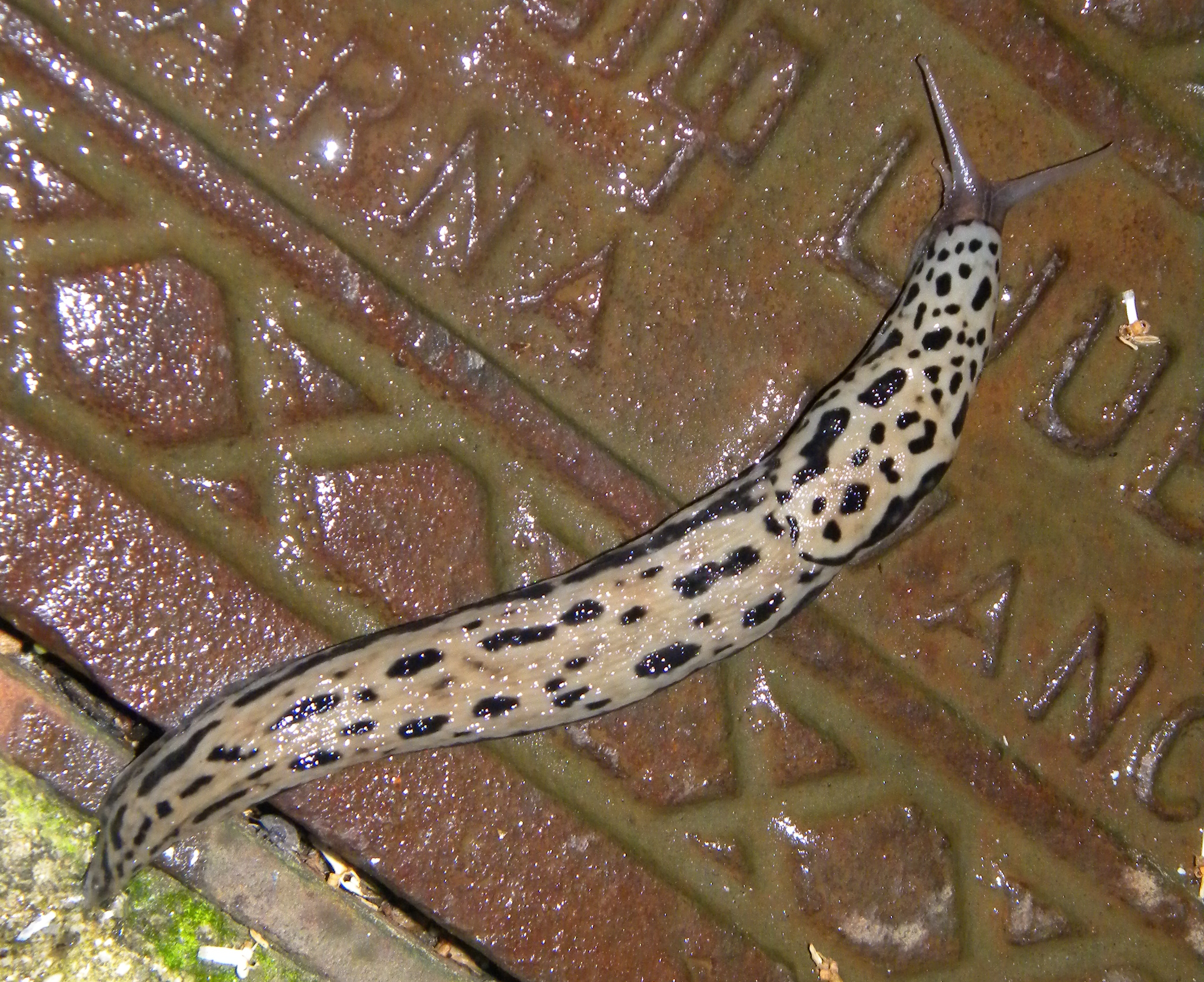
A lighter specimen

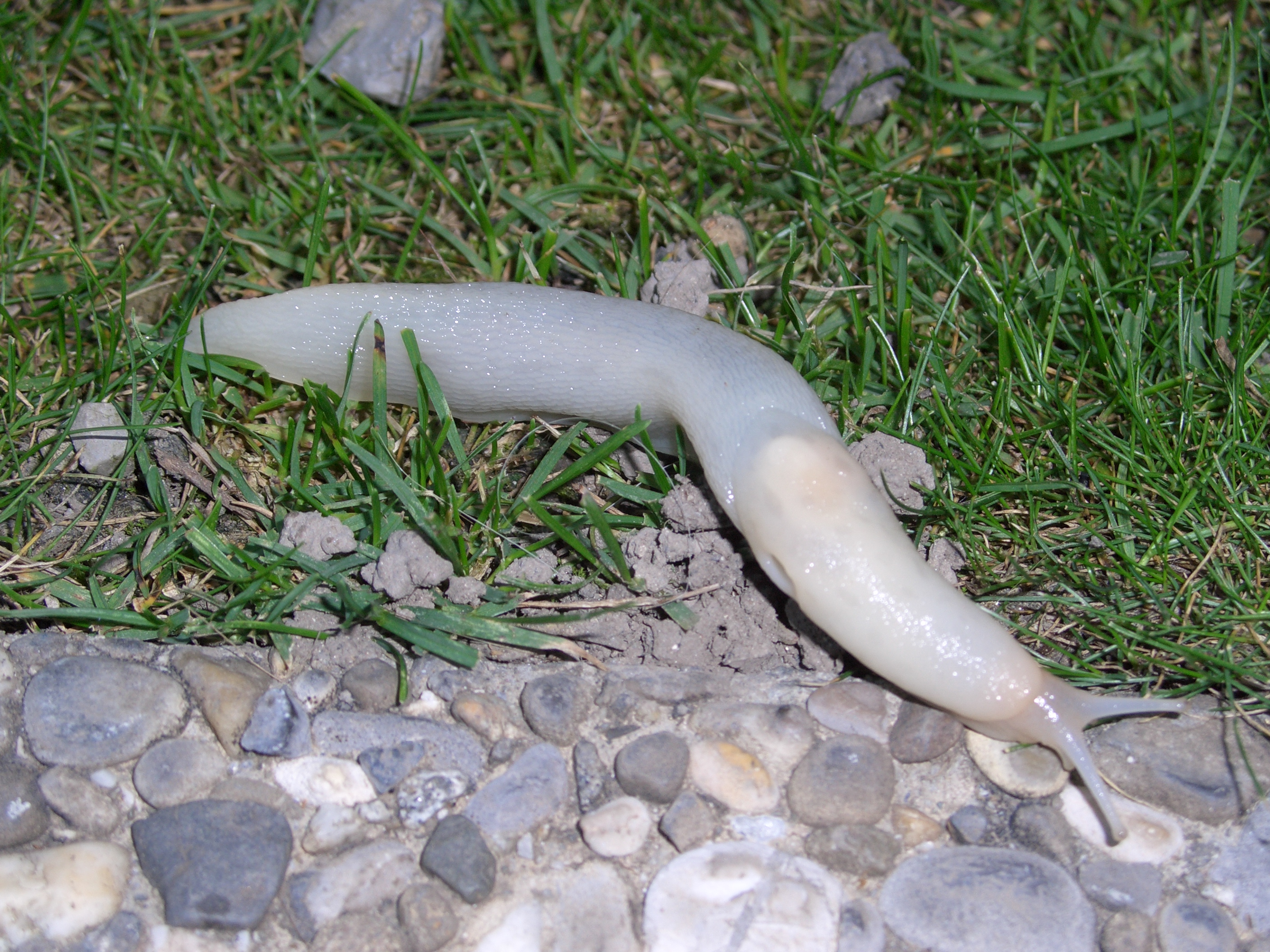
var. candida

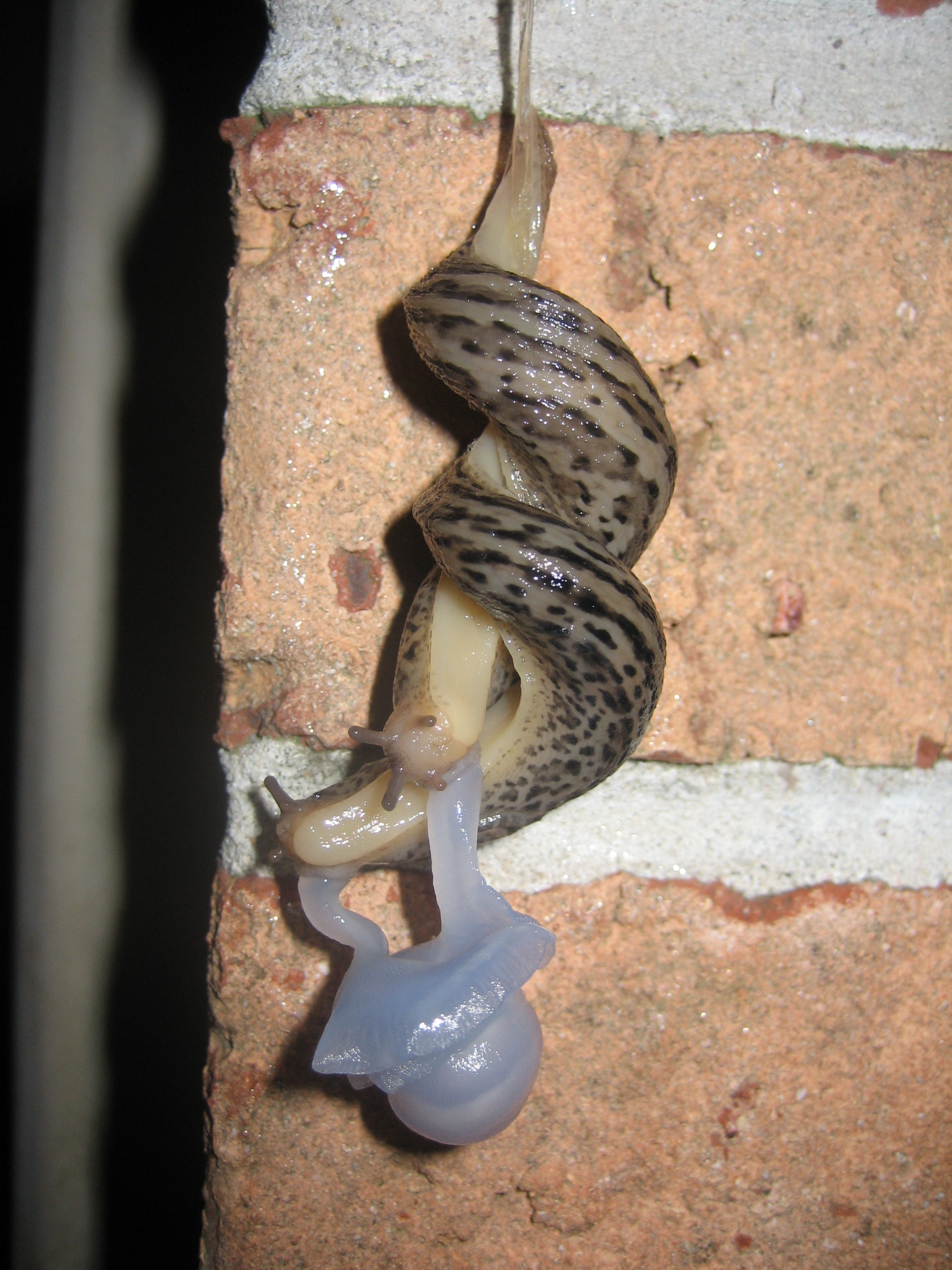
Mating

Mating in Bariloche, Argentina, where the species is invasive.

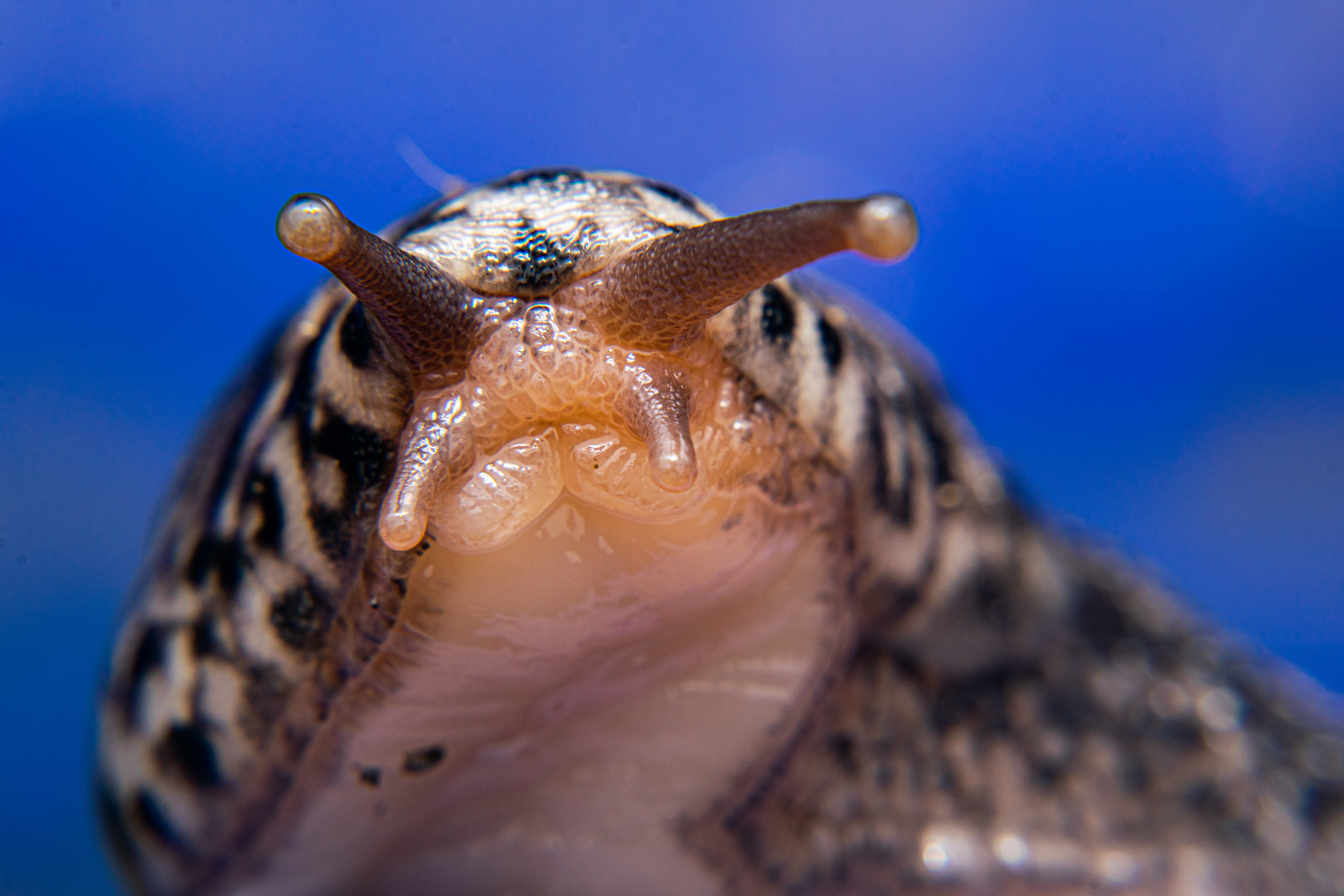
Face of the slug in Bariloche, Argentina.
