= Agfa (disambiguation) =

Agfa is an imaging technologies company.

Agfa may also refer to:

- Agfa (nematode), a genus of nematode in the family Agfidae
- AgfaPhoto, a defunct photographic products company, now used as a licensed brand
- American Genre Film Archive, American non-profit that collects, preserves and distributes films; for example, Take It Out in Trade
  - AGFA Horror Trailer Show, a 2020 compilation film
