= Chitwood =

Chitwood is a surname. Notable people with the surname include:

- Bill Chitwood (1890–1961), American fiddler
- Christina Chitwood (born 1990), American ice dancer
- Joie Chitwood (1912–1988), American racing driver and businessman
- May Belle Hutson Chitwood (1908–1994), American author, nematologist, helminthologist, and zoologist
- Mike Chitwood, American law enforcement officer
- Randolph Chitwood, American surgeon
- Whitney Chitwood, American stand-up comedian

== See also ==
- Chitwood, Oregon, an unincorporated community in Oregon, United States
