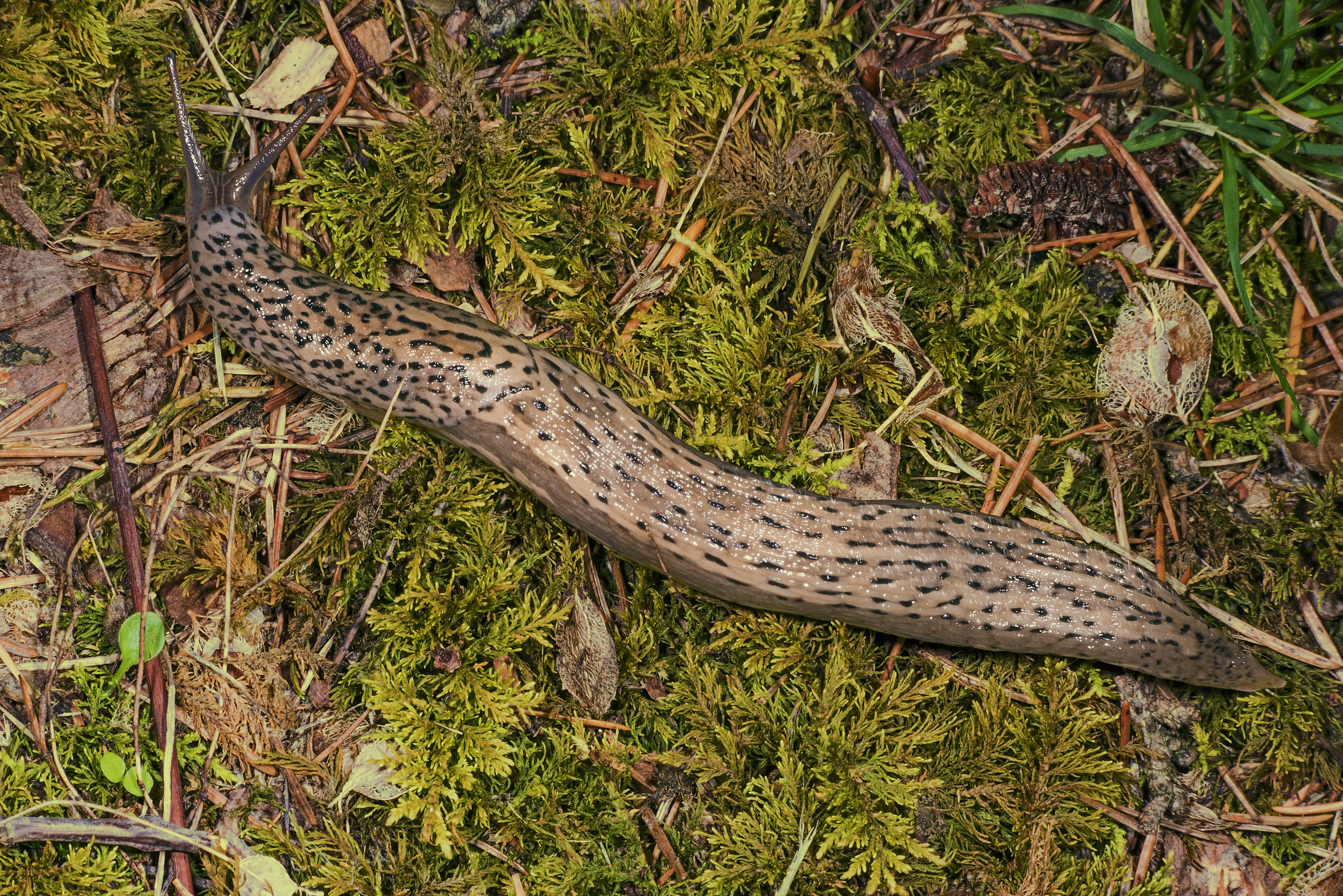
- Limax maximus

Scientific classification
- Kingdom: Animalia
- Phylum: Mollusca
- Class: Gastropoda
- Order: Stylommatophora
- Family: Limacidae
- Subfamily: Limacinae
- Genus: Limax; Linnaeus, 1758

Species
- at least 33, see text

Synonyms
- List: Chromolimax Pini, 1877; Eulimax Moquin-Tandon, 1855; Gestroa Pini, 1877; Heynemannia Malm, 1868; Limacella Brard, 1815; Limax (Brachylimax) Falkner & Niederhöfer, 2008· accepted, alternate representation; Limax (Eulimax) Moquin-Tandon, 1855; † Limax (Heinemannia) Malm, 1868 (junior objective synonym; incorrect subsequent spelling); Limax (Heynemannia) Malm, 1868 (junior objective synonym); Limax (Limax) Linnaeus, 1758· accepted, alternate representation; Macroheynemannia Simroth, 1888; Opilolimax Pini, 1877; Prolimax Simroth, 1906; Stabilea Pini, 1877

= Limax =

Genus of land slug

Limax is a genus of air-breathing land slugs in the terrestrial pulmonate gastropod mollusk family Limacidae.

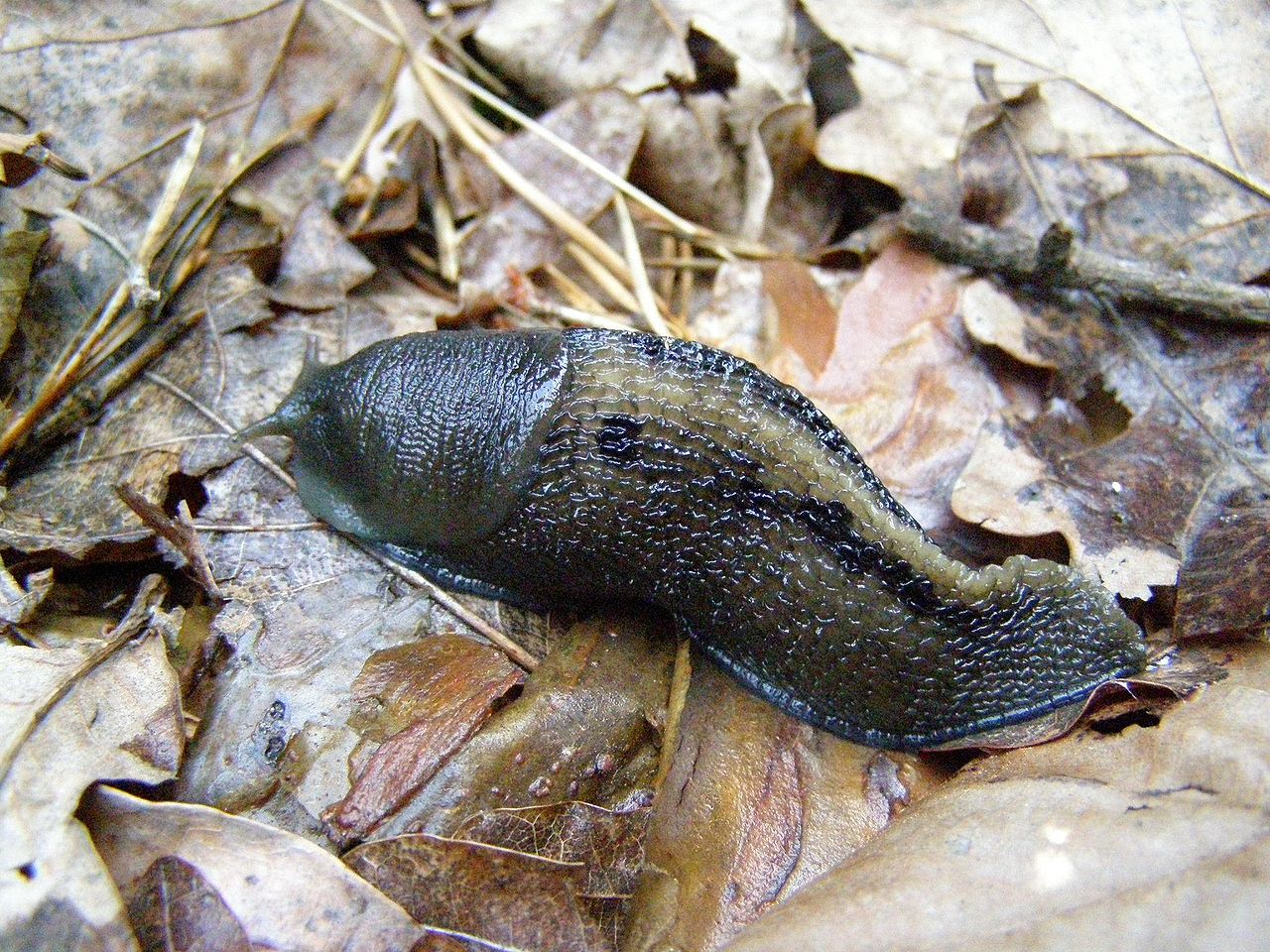
Limax cinereoniger

The generic name Limax literally means "slug". Snail-eating animals, such as certain snakes, are thus called limaxivorous.

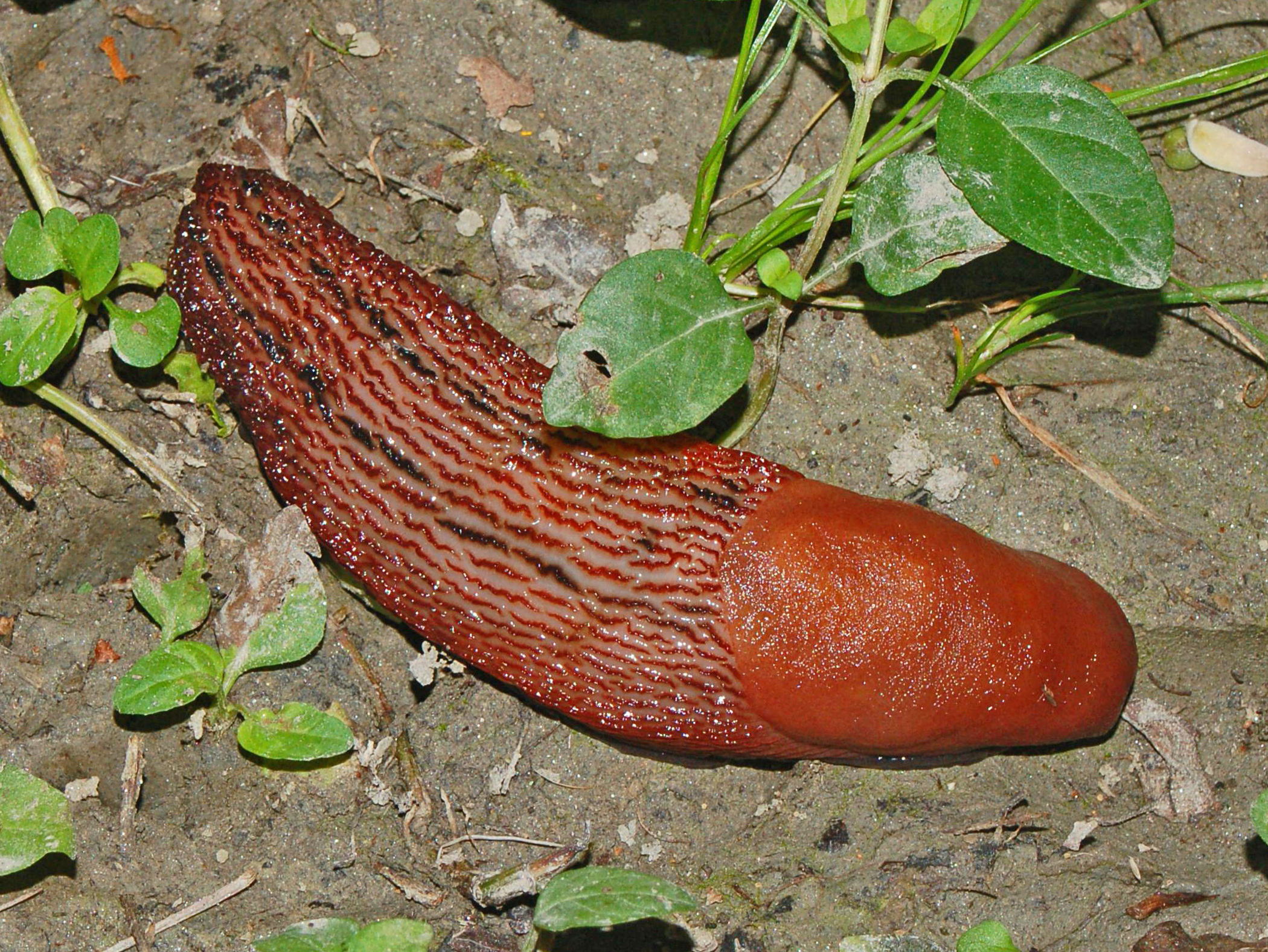
Limax dacampi

Some species, such as the leopard slug (L. maximus), are beneficial for the garden.

The genus Limax sensu stricto is probably monophyletic.

== Distribution ==
This genus is native to Europe, but at least one species (L. maximus) has been introduced into North America.

== Species ==
The genus Limax includes at least 33 species:

- Limax aeolianus Giusti, 1973
- Limax albipes Dumont & Mortillet, 1853
- Limax amaliae Bettoni, 1870
- Limax bielzii Seibert, 1873
- Limax brandstetteri Falkner, 2008
- Limax camerani Lessona & Pollonera, 1882
- Limax canapicianus Pollonera, 1885
- Limax cephalonicus Simroth, 1886
- Limax ciminensis Pollonera, 1890
- Limax cinereoniger Wolf, 1803 (syn. Limax alpinus Férussac, 1822)
- Limax conemenosi Böttger, 1882
- Limax corsicus Moquin-Tandon, 1855
- Limax dacampi Menegazzi, 1854
  - Limax dacampi dacampi Menegazzi, 1855
- Limax dobrogicus Grossu & Lupu, 1960
- Limax doriae Bourguignat, 1861
- Limax engadinensis Heynemann, 1863
- Limax erythrus Bourguignat, 1864
- Limax gerhardti Niethammer, 1937
- Limax giovannellae Falkner & Niederhöfer, 2008
- Limax giustii Falkner & Nitz, 2010
- Limax graciadeii Gerhardt, 1940
- Limax graecus Simroth, 1889
- Limax granosus Bérenguier, 1900
- Limax hemmeni Rähle, 1983
- Limax ianninii Giusti, 1973
- Limax ilvensis Falkner & Nitz, 2010
- Limax lachensis Bérenguier, 1900
- Limax luctuosus Moquin-Tandon, 1855
- Limax maximus Linnaeus, 1758 - great grey slug
- Limax millipunctatus Pini, 1885
- Limax monolineatus Bettoni, 1870
- Limax monregalensis Lessona & Pollonera, 1882
- Limax pironae Pini, 1876
- Limax polipunctatus Pollonera, 1888
- Limax pseudocinereoniger Schilthuizen, Thompson, de Vries, van Peursen, Reisinger, Paterno, Maestri, Marcolungo, Esposti, Delledonne & Njunjić, 2022
- Limax punctulatus Sordelli, 1871
- Limax redii Gerhardt, 1933
- Limax samensis Heim & Nitz, 2009
- Limax squamosus Bérenguier, 1900
- Limax strobeli Pini, 1876
- Limax subalpinus Lessona, 1880
- Limax tschapecki Simroth, 1886
- Limax veronensis Lessona & Pollonera, 1882
- Limax vizzavonensis Falkner & Nitz, 2010
- Limax wohlberedti Simroth, 1900
- Limax wolterstorffi Simroth, 1900
- Limax zilchi Grossu & Lupu, 1960

=== Subgenus Limacus (more often today treated as its own genus) ===
- Limax ecarinatus Boettger, 1881: synonym of Limacus maculatus (Kaleniczenko, 1851)
- Limax flavus Linnaeus, 1758 yellow garden slug, tawny garden slug: synonym of Limacus flavus (Linnaeus, 1758)

== Synonyms ==
- Limax marginatus Müller, 1774 is a synonym for Lehmannia marginata (Müller, 1774)
- Limax valentianus Férussac, 1822 is a synonym for Ambigolimax valentianus (Férussac, 1822)
- Limax nyctelius Bourguignat, 1861 is now placed in the genus Letourneuxia but the name has been used for Lehmannia carpatica (Bourguignat, 1861) and Ambigolimax waterstoni Hutchinson, Reise & Schlitt, 2022
