= Limaxivory =

Eating of snails

Limaxivory means the eating of snails. Several groups of animals are specialized snail eaters, such as species of the snake genus Pareas. Other snakes at least occasionally eat snails, such as snakes of the genus Contia. The term is derived from the Latin "limax," = slug, and "-vore," = eating. Limax is also a genus of slugs and the namesake of the snail family Limacidae.
