= Agfa flexilis =

Scientific classification
- Domain: Eukaryota
- Kingdom: Animalia
- Phylum: Nematoda
- Class: Chromadorea
- Order: Rhabditida
- Family: Agfidae
- Genus: Agfa
- Species: A. flexilis

Binomial name
- Agfa flexilis (Dujardin, 1845)

Synonyms
- Leptodera flexilis Dujardin, 1845

Species of roundworm

Agfa flexilis is a species of parasitic nematode.

Agfa flexilis is the type species of the genus Agfa.

== Hosts ==
- Limax cinereoniger
- Limax maximus
