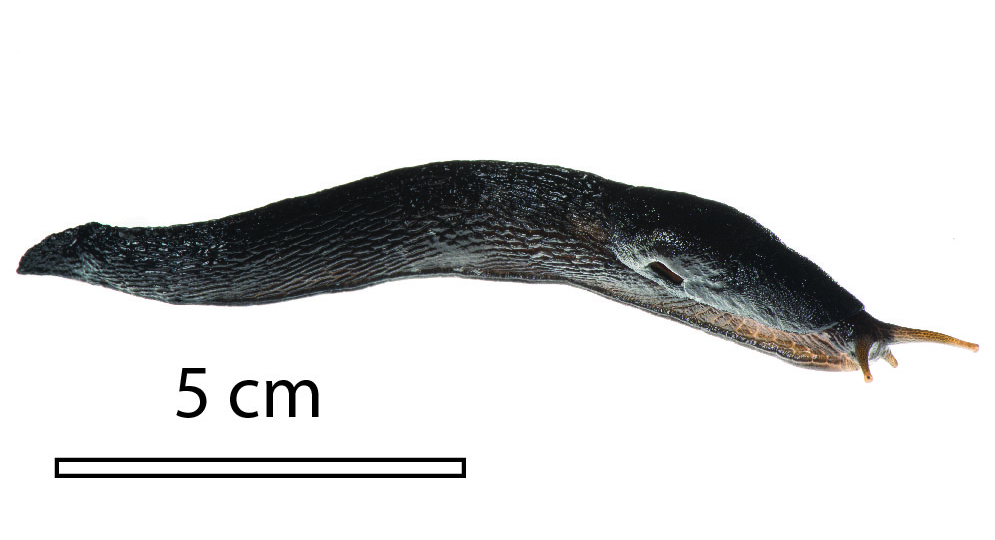

Scientific classification
- Kingdom: Animalia
- Phylum: Mollusca
- Class: Gastropoda
- Order: Stylommatophora
- Family: Limacidae
- Genus: Limax
- Species: L. pseudocinereoniger

Binomial name
- Limax pseudocinereoniger Schilthuizen et al., 2020

= Limax pseudocinereoniger =

Species of gastropod

Limax pseudocinereoniger is a land slug endemic to the Balkan Peninsula, discovered in Montenegro and also reported from Bulgaria. It is up to 116 mm (4.6 in) in length, one of the longest slugs in Europe. It was discovered by amateur zoologists in 2019. Its genetic code differs significantly from the other Limax species in the valley.
