= Napoleone Pini =

Italian zoologist and palaeontologist

Napoleone Pini (1835, Milan – 22 March 1907, Milan) was an Italian zoologist and palaeontologist.

== Biography ==
Napoleone Pini was born into an aristocratic family. He was an accountant. In 1872 he became a member of the Società Entomologica Italiana. In 1873 he was appointed member of the Società Italiana di Scienze Naturali di Milano. In this Society he was Secretary since 1878. He was also a member of the Società Malacologica Italiana (1875-1895).

The terrestrial molluscs were always his main interest. He specially studied the slugs of Lombardy. He wrote 17 works of malacology, in addition to a report on the Phylloxera, the description of Cychrus cylindricollis, Acme elegantissima and the collection of specimen for anatomical studies on Limax doriae.

Pini's mollusc collections were destroyed when Museo Civico di Storia Naturale di Milano was damaged in 1943 by Allied bombings. His Coleoptera collections are held by Museo Civico di Storia Naturale di Genova, while a collection of 100 series of molluscs from southern Italy is held by Natural History Museum of Bern.

== Works ==
- Pini, N., 1871 - Descrizione di un nuovo carabico appartenente al genere Cychrus Fabr. Atti Soc. It. Sc. Nat 14, p. 224-227
- Pini, N., 1874 - Sopra una nuova Campylaea del gruppo della Helix cingulata Studer Atti Soc. It. Sc. Nat 17, p. 41-54
- Pini, N., 1874 - Osservazioni critiche alle osservazioni e rettifiche del Prof. P. Strobel Atti Soc. It. Sc. Nat 17, p. 421-431
- Pini, N., 1875 - Clausilia Spreafici Pini Bull. Soc. Mal. It. 1, p. 164-165.
- Pini, N., 1876 - Molluschi terrestri e d'acqua dolce viventi nel territorio d'Esino Bull. Soc. Mal. It. 2, 67-206, 2 tavv.
- Pini, N., 1876 - Notizie malacologiche relative alla fauna lombarda Atti Soc. It. Sc. nat. 19, p. 493-499
- Pini, N., 1878 - Nuove specie o forme poco note di Molluschi. Contribuzione alla Fauna malacologica d'Italia Atti Soc. It. Sc. Nat. 21, p. 612-628.
- Pini, N., 1878 - Contribuzione alla fauna fossile postpliocenica della Lombardia Atti Soc. It. Sc. Nat. 21, p. 774-779
- Pini, N., 1879 - Appunti malacologici. Sopra alcune forme di conchiglie italiane pubblicate come nuove specie nel Vol. V del Bullettino della Società Malacologica Italiana Atti Soc. It. Sc. Nat. 22, p. 156-175
- Pini, N., 1879 - Relazione annuale della Commissione di sorveglianza contro la Fillossera, sul servizio delle vedette nell'anno 1879 Atti Soc. It. Sc. nat. XXII, 337.
- Pini, N., 1879 - Argomentazioni di Napoleone Pini sulle due parole del Dott. Carlo De Stefani intorno ad alcune Clausilie toscane Bull. Soc. Mal. It. 5, 237-261.
- Pini, N., 1883 - Nuova contribuzione alla fauna fossile postpliocenica della Lombardia Atti Soc. It. Sc. Nat. 26, p. 48-70
- Pini, N., 1883 - Nuove forme di Clausilie italiane Atti Soc. It. Sc. Nat. 26, p. 137 - 143
- Pini, N., 1883 - Un po' di luce sulla Hyalina obscurata Porro Atti Soc. It. Sc. Nat. 26, p. 389-404
- Pini, N., 1884 - Note malacologiche sulla fauna italiana Atti Soc. It. Sc. Nat. 27, p. 79 - 87
- Pini, N. 1884 - Novità malacologiche Atti Soc. It. Sc. Nat. 27, p. 230-256)
- Pini, N., 1884 - Novità malacologiche. 2a Nota. Atti Soc. It. Sc. Nat. 27, p. 368-382, tav. 12]
- Pini, N. 1885 - Due nuove forme di Helix italiane del gruppo della Variabilis Drap. Atti Soc. It. Sc. Nat. 28, p. 165-168
- Pini, N., 1886 - Nuova forma di Acme italiana (Acme elegantissima Pini) - Atti Soc. It. Sc. Nat. 29, p. 521-522
