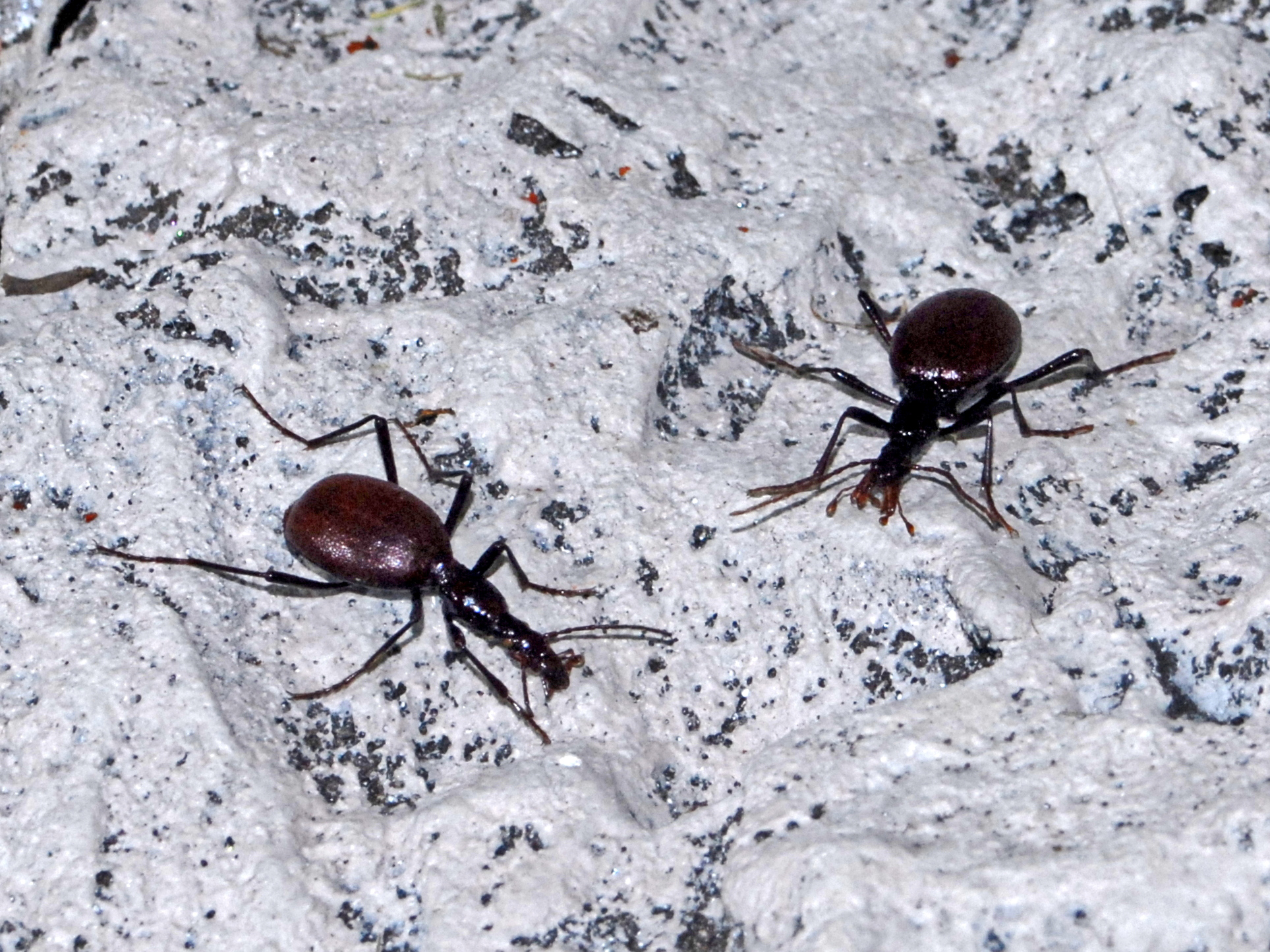
- Cychrus cylindricollis. Mounted specimens on display at the Museo Civico di Storia Naturale di Milano

Scientific classification
- Domain: Eukaryota
- Kingdom: Animalia
- Phylum: Arthropoda
- Class: Insecta
- Order: Coleoptera
- Suborder: Adephaga
- Family: Carabidae
- Genus: Cychrus
- Species: C. cylindricollis

Binomial name
- Cychrus cylindricollis Pini, 1871

= Cychrus cylindricollis =

Species of beetle

Cychrus cylindricollis is a species of ground beetle in the subfamily of Carabinae. It was described by Pini in 1871.

== Description ==
Cychrus cylindricollis can reach a length of about 22–25 millimetres (0.87–0.98 in). The body show a brilliant black with irregular small streaks and granulation. The head is long and narrow with a flat forehead. The eyes are small and antennas are quite long. The long prothorax is almost cylindrical. Elytra are globose, fused together; the second pair of wings is atrophied. The long and thin black legs are suited for running.

== Distribution ==
This snail eater coleopter is endemic to Italian Alps, between Lake of Como and Lake of Garda. It lives at an elevation of 1,800–2,000 metres (5,900–6,600 ft) above sea level.

== Ethology ==
Cychrus cylindricollis has nocturnal habits. Both adults and larvae feed on small gastropods. The narrow and elongated head and thorax allow this coleopter to penetrate into the shells of the snails.
