= Agfa (nematode) =

Scientific classification
- Kingdom: Animalia
- Phylum: Nematoda
- Class: Chromadorea
- Order: Rhabditida
- Family: Agfidae
- Genus: Agfa; Chitwood, 1935

Synonyms
- Leptodera Dujardin, 1844; Leptoderes Dujardin, 1844

Genus of roundworms

Agfa is the only genus in the parasitic nematode family Agfidae. There are only three known species: Agfa flexilis, A. morandi and A. tauricus. They are all obligate parasites in terrestrial gastropods.

== Species ==
- Agfa flexilis (Dujardin, 1845)
- Agfa morandi Ribas & Casanova, 2002
- Agfa tauricus Korol & Spiridonov, 1991
