= Limax amaliae =

Scientific classification
- Kingdom: Animalia
- Phylum: Mollusca
- Class: Gastropoda
- Order: Stylommatophora
- Family: Limacidae
- Genus: Limax
- Species: L. amaliae

Binomial name
- Limax amaliae Bettoni, 1870

Species of gastropod

Limax amaliae is a species of air-breathing land slug, a terrestrial pulmonate gastropod mollusk in the family Limacidae, the keelback slugs. So far, it has not been adequately investigated and is therefore an unsafe species

== Etymology ==
The species was named after Mrs. Amalia Marangoni Maj from Pavia. She had her own literary club in Pavia, which among others hosted the young Albert Einstein as a violinist.

== Taxonomy ==
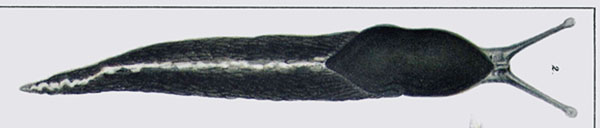
Limax amaliae. Reproduction of Bettonis plate 2 Fig.2

The taxon was first described by Eugenio Bettoni in 1871 as Limax Da-Campi var. amaliae. The holotype came from Lambrate near Milan. Lambrate is now a district of Milan and is completely overbuilt. In the “Natura Mediterraneo” forum, however, photos of two specimens of this species were recently presented. One specimen was found near Giussago (province of Pavia), close to the border with the metropolitan city of Milan, the other specimen near Paullo (metropolitan city of Milan).

== Description ==
Limax amaliae shows a thin, somewhat irregular white central line. The body is deep black to greyish black. The mantle is less dark. On the longitudinally three-parted sole, the marginal areas are bluish-gray, while the middle one is pale. The back has very strong, heavily pleated longitudinal folds and furrows. The anatomy is not yet known.

== Distribution ==
The species has only become known from a small area in the vicinity of Milan and the neighboring province of Pavia (Italy).

== Biology ==
So far nothing is known about the way of life, especially about the copulatory behavior so important for the taxonomy of Limax species.

== Bibliography ==
- Alzona, C. 1971: Malacofauna Italica. Catalogo e bibliografia dei molluschi viventi, terrestri e d'acqua dolce. - Atti Soc. ital. Sci. nat., Mus. Civ. St. Nat., Milano, 111: 1–433.: Lombardia [L. dacampoi menegazzii amaliae Bettoni 1870]
- Bettoni, Eugenio 1871: Sul Limax Da-Campi, note malacologiche. Bullettino Malacologico Italiano, 3(5): 161–166, pls.3,4
