= May Belle Hutson Chitwood =

American author, nematologist, helminthologist, and zoologist

May Belle Hutson Chitwood (September 17, 1908 – September 19, 1994) was an American author and zoologist at the Agricultural Research Service, curator of the National Parasite Collection, and director of the primate parasite registry at University of California, Davis. Chitwood specialized in the morphology of nematodes early in the research of this aspect of the species, and was considered a world authority. She published over 50 research papers about nematology, helminthology, and zoology.

== Early life and family ==
Chitwood was born in Lubbock, Texas on 17 September 1908. She graduated from the University of Maryland, College Park in 1958, and received an honorary doctorate of science from Northern Michigan University in 1977.

Chitwood was married on April 17, 1927, to Benjamin Goodwin Chitwood on April 17, 1927. They had two children. She divorced from Benjamin in 1952.

== Career ==
Chitwood co-authored An Introduction to Nematology (1937) with her husband. They went on to write follow up volumes in 1938, 1940, and 1941 and reprinted in 1974. The couple lived on Long Island from 1937 to 1947, studying the nematodes of potatoes and ornamental plants. In 1947, they moved back to Beltsville where they studied root-knot nematodes. During this time, Chitwood worked with her husband as an unpaid consultant.

After her marriage ended, Chitwood worked as a zoologist in the Agriculture Department for 20 years, working on parasite classification and at the research center in Beltsville in the distribution unit, first as a technician and later as a Senior Scientist. She worked with Allen McIntosh, Frank Douvers, and Ralph Lichtenfels. She curated the United States National Parasite Collection. She was the director of the primate parasite registry at the University of California, Davis until 1976 when she retired. She was a Life Member of the Helminthological Society of Washington.

== Bibliography ==
- Chitwood, Benjamin Goodwin; Chitwood, May Belle Hutson, An Introduction to Nematology, Baltimore, Md., Monumental Printing Co. (1937)
- Chitwood M, Lichtenfels JR. Identification of parasitic metazoa in tissue sections. Exp Parasitol. 1972 Dec. 32(3) pp. 407–519.

== Death ==
Chitwood died in her daughter's home in Nichols, Iowa from Alzheimer's disease.
