= Asperö =

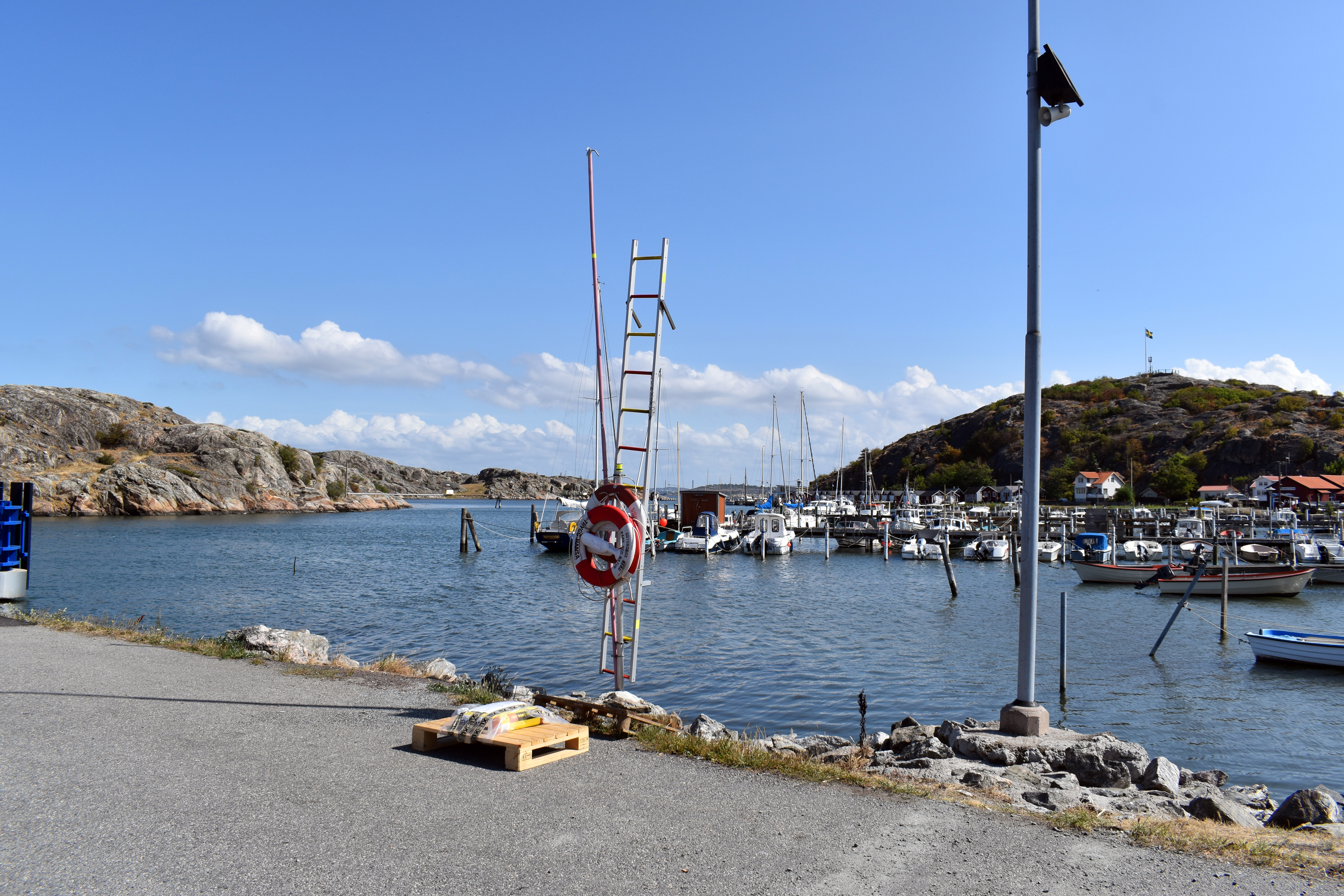
- Asperö Norra ferry stop

- Location within Västra Götaland Location within Sweden
- Coordinates: 57°39′N 11°48′E
- Country: Sweden
- Province: Västergötland
- County: Västra Götaland County
- Municipality: Göteborg Municipality

Area
  - Total: 0.33 km^{2} (0.13 sq mi)

Population (31 December 2010)
  - Total: 402
  - Density: 1,230/km^{2} (3,200/sq mi)
- Time zone: UTC+1 (CET)
  - Summer (DST): UTC+2 (CEST)

Asperö is a small island and a locality situated in Gothenburg Municipality, Västra Götaland County, Sweden. It had 402 inhabitants in 2010. It lies in the Southern Gothenburg Archipelago.
