= Benjamin Goodwin Chitwood =

American nematologist

- Born: December 21, 1907; Chicago
- Died: November 19, 1972 (aged 64)
- Alma mater: George Washington University
- Occupation: Nematologist
- Employer: United States Department of Agriculture
- Spouse(s): May Belle Hutson Chitwood

Benjamin Goodwin Chitwood (1907-November 19, 1972) was an American zoologist and pioneer in nematology. He published extensively and broadly in the field of nematology. An Introduction to Nematology, published with his wife May Belle Hutson Chitwood, was a major contribution to the field. Chitwood identified the species Globodera rostochiensis on Long Island in 1941 and as part of his work on higher classification revised the taxonomy of the root-knot nematode Meloidogyne incognita in 1949. This led to changes in research and control strategies for it. He served as president of the Helminthological Society of Washington in 1949 and was made a Life Member of the Society in 1968.

== Education ==
Chitwood received a bachelor's degree from Rice Institute in 1928 and a master's degree and doctorate from George Washington University in 1929 and 1931, respectively. His thesis involved The Role of Nematodes in Strawberry Diseases (1931).

== Career ==
From 1928 to 1931, Chitwood also was employed full-time as a junior nematologist, under the supervision of Nathan Cobb, in the Division of Technology and Nematology of the Bureau of Plant Industry in the United States Department of Agriculture (USDA). From 1931 to 1937, Chitwood worked in another section, the Zoological Section of the Bureau of Plant Industry, with Maurice Crowther Hall. During this time he published more than 70 papers and became involved in nematode higher classification and work on marine nematodes. Chitwood and his wife May Belle Hutson Chitwood (M. B. Chitwood) made a major contribution to the study of nematodes in writing An Introduction to Nematology, published in 1937. Additional volumes followed in 1938, 1940, and 1941. Numerous reprints were made in later years. These books were the first important teaching tools for students of nematology around the world.

After returning to the Bureau of Plant Industry in 1937, Chitwood was transferred to Long Island, New York, where he worked until 1947. There he studied nematode diseases in ornamental plants and revised the taxonomy of the root-knot nematode. In 1941, he identified Globodera rostochiensis which he named the “golden nematode”, on Long Island. Because of the extensive harm it could do, this led to stringent steps to eradicate infestations. Chitwood was resented for these "drastic quarantine regulations". When a fire destroyed his laboratory at the USDA station, along with the irreplaceable manuscript of his book on the genus Rhabditis, some suspected that it might have been intentionally set. In addition to these devastating blows, Chitwood was divorced from his first wife in 1952.

In 1947 Chitwood was transferred to Beltsville. In 1949 he became president of the Helminthological Society of Washington. From 1950 to 1952 he was a professor associate in parasitology at Catholic University. After holding various minor positions, he was appointed as the first chief nematologist of the Florida State Plant Board in February 1955. He established and developed the Nematology Section of that institution, remaining there until 1958, when he was invited by Ellsworth C. Dougherty to become a consultant in the Laboratory of Comparative Morphology and Physiology of the Kaiser Foundation Research Institute. He subsequently held various positions until his retirement in 1964.

Chitwood's hobbies included long-distance running and the breeding of champion beagle dogs. Benjamin G. Chitwood died of a heart attack, on November 19, 1972, ending a career that had a profound influence on nematology for more than 40 years.
