= Limax doriae =

Doria's slug

Scientific classification
- Kingdom: Animalia
- Phylum: Mollusca
- Class: Gastropoda
- Order: Stylommatophora
- Family: Limacidae
- Genus: Limax
- Species: L. doriae

Binomial name
- Limax doriae Bourguignat 1861

Species of gastropod

Limax doriae, common name Doria's slug, is a species of air-breathing land slug, a terrestrial pulmonate gastropod mollusk in the family Limacidae, the keelback slugs.

== Etymology ==
Jules René Bourguignat (1829 - 1892) named this species in honor of the Marquis Giacomo Doria, an Italian naturalist, herpetologist, and politician.

== Subspecies ==
- Limax doriae simplex Lessona & Pollonera 1882 (Piemonte, Liguria, Toscana);
- Limax doriae lineatus Lessona & Pollonera 1882 (Piemonte, Liguria, Toscana);
- Limax doriae rubronotatus Lessona & Pollonera 1882 (Piemonte, Liguria, Toscana);
- Limax doriae fuscus Lessona & Pollonera 1882 (Piemonte, Liguria);
- Limax doriae brunneus Lessona & Pollonera 1882 (Piemonte, Liguria);
- Limax doriae lineatus Lessona & Pollonera 1882 (Piemonte, Liguria);
- Limax doriae sanguineus Lessona & Pollonera 1882 (Piemonte, Liguria).

== Description ==
Limax doriae reaches a length of about 36 centimetres (14 in).

== Distribution ==
This species is endemic to the French Alpes-Maritimes and to a few northern Italian regions: (Piedmont, Liguria and Tuscany).

== Habitat ==
This species prefers humid and shady areas, and is found resting under stones.

== Bibliography ==
- Sordelli, F. 1871. Anatomia del Limax Doriae, Bourg., nei suoi rapporti con altre specie congeneri. - Atti della Società Italiana di Scienze Naturali 13 (3) 1870 : 242-253, Tav. 3. Milano.
- Lessona, Mario & Carlo Pollonera 1882: Monografia dei limacidi italiani. S.1-82, Taf.1-3. Turin, Loescher.
- Welter-Schultes, F. (2012): European non-marine molluscs, a guide for species identification. 760 pp.
