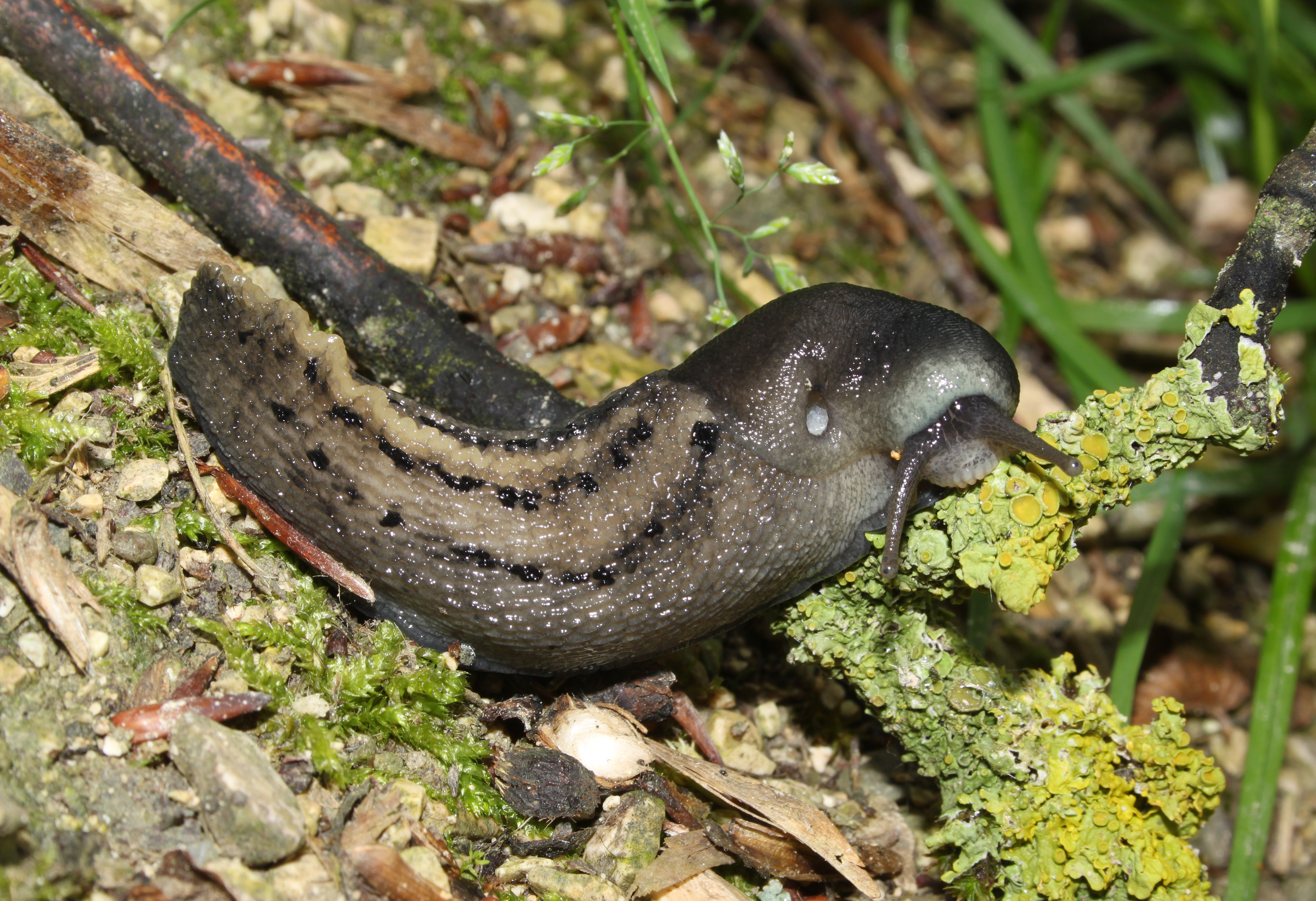

Conservation status
- Least Concern (IUCN 3.1)

Scientific classification
- Kingdom: Animalia
- Phylum: Mollusca
- Class: Gastropoda
- Order: Stylommatophora
- Family: Limacidae
- Genus: Limax
- Species: L. cinereoniger

Binomial name
- Limax cinereoniger Wolf, 1803

Synonyms
- Limax alpinus Férussac, 1822

= Limax cinereoniger =

Species of gastropod

Limax cinereoniger, also known as the ash-black slug, is a large species of air-breathing land slug in the terrestrial pulmonate gastropod mollusc family Limacidae, the keelback slugs. This is the largest land slug species in the world.

== Distribution ==
This slug is native to Europe. It is recorded in most of Europe, including Bulgaria, Czech Republic (where it is of least concern), Italy, Netherlands, Slovakia, Ireland, Great Britain, Finland, Ukraine, and several other countries. It occurs east as far as the Urals. It is common in much of its range, but mostly rare or absent in southernmost Europe. Although known from the Iberian Peninsula and the Balkans, there are no records from Portugal or Greece.

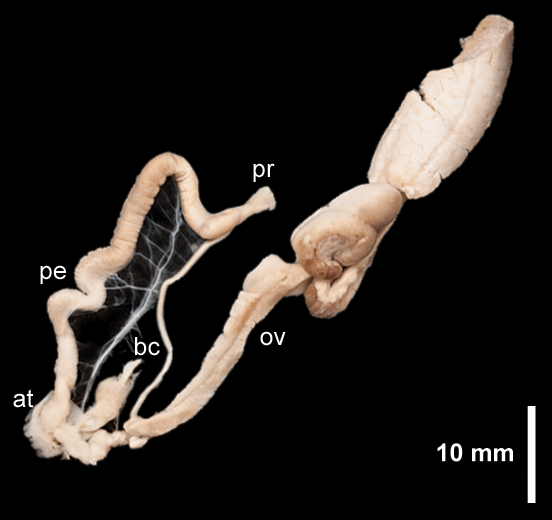
Reproductive system of Limax cinereoniger: pr - penial retractor muscle; pe - penis; at - atrium; bc - bursa copulatrix; ov - oviduct.

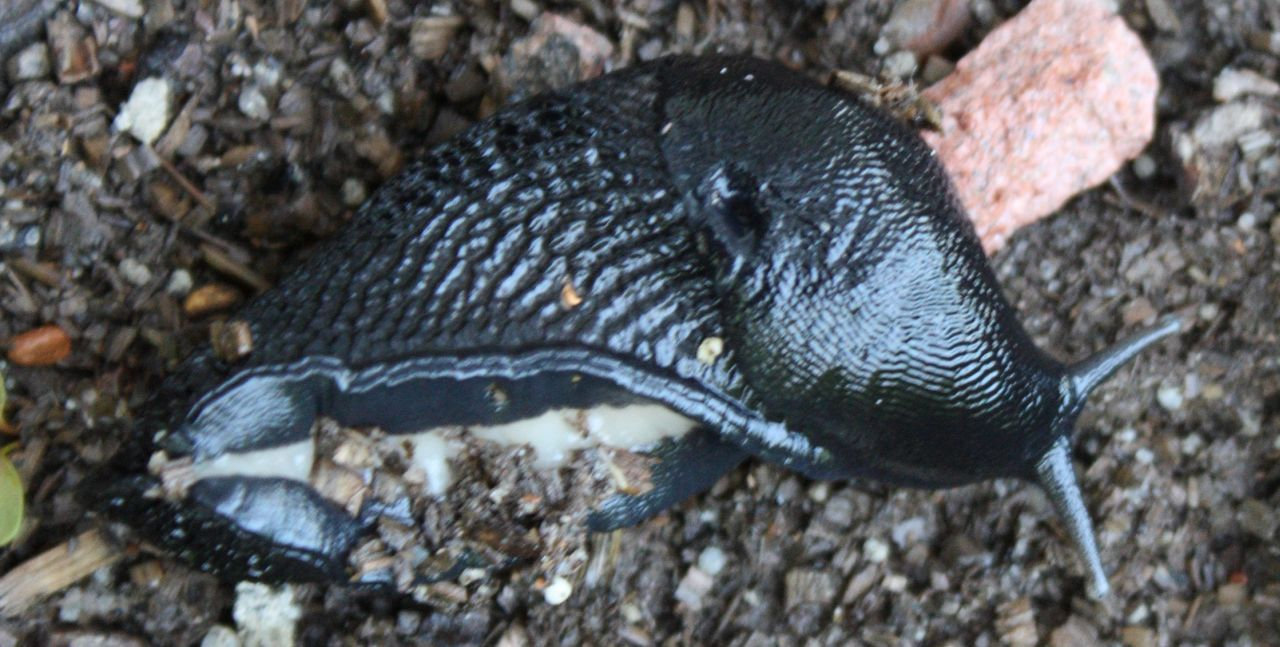
White stripe under foot

== Description ==
Juvenile ash-gray slugs are toffee brown. Adults are variable in color, including jet black, dark gray, pale gray and medium brown. A white to pale tan stripe runs along the long, prominent keel, and the foot sole of adults is pale in the middle with dark edges, wheres in juveniles it is all white. The tentacles are dark with black or brown spots. This species can reach over 30 cm, though most adults are between 10 and 20 cm.

== Ecology ==
This species lives in ancient woodlands and occasionally parks, under dead leaves and logs. It feeds primarily on mushrooms and algae and is not considered a pest.

== Parasites ==
Parasites of Limax cinereoniger include nematodes of genus Elaphostrongylus and Agfa flexilis.
