= International Code of Zoological Nomenclature =

Code of scientific nomenclature for animals

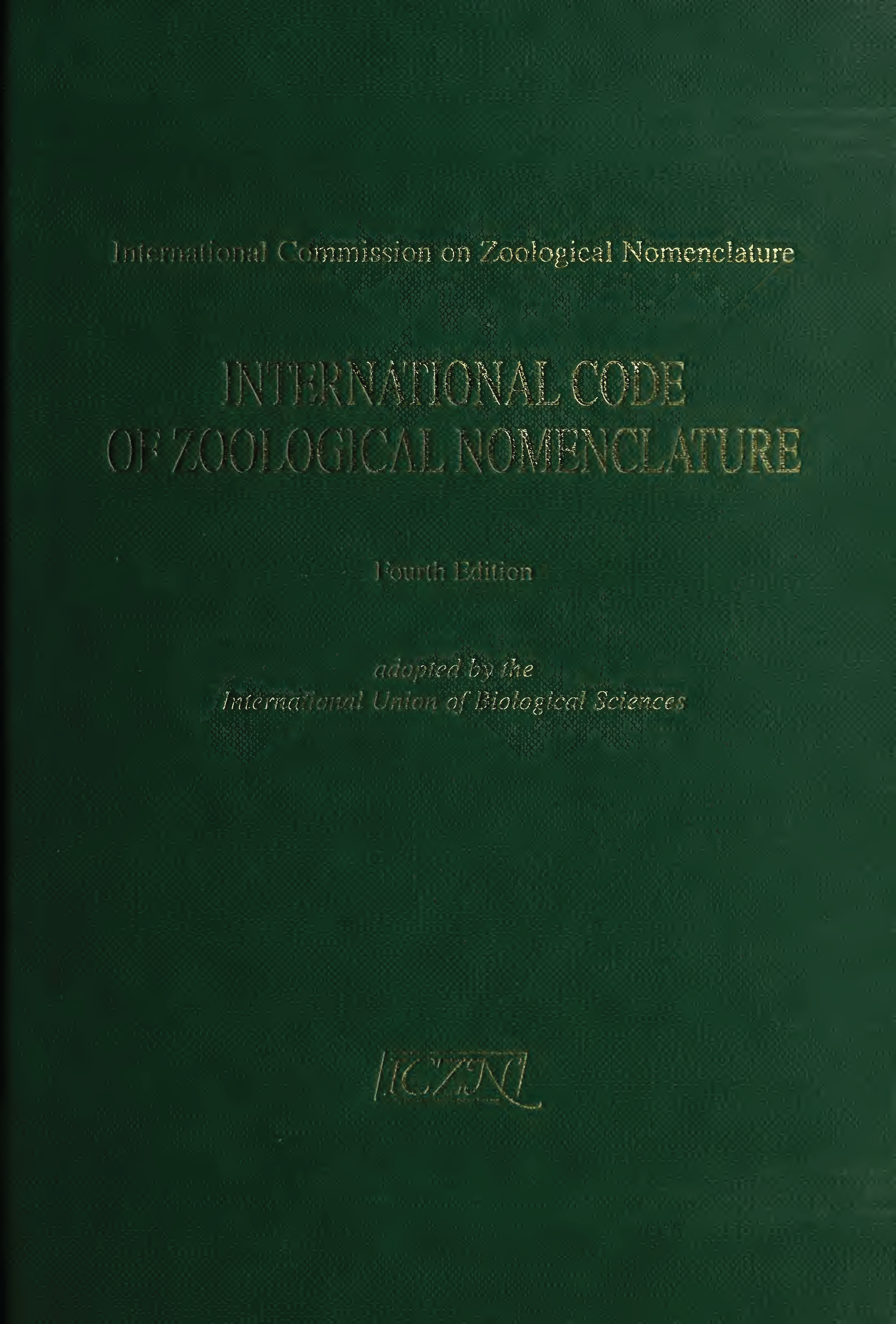
Front Cover of the 4th edition of the International Code of Zoological Nomenclature

The International Code of Zoological Nomenclature (ICZN) is a widely accepted convention in zoology that rules the formal scientific naming of organisms treated as animals. It is also informally known as the ICZN Code, for its formal author, the International Commission on Zoological Nomenclature (which shares the initialism "ICZN"). The rules principally regulate:

- How names are correctly established in the frame of binominal nomenclature
- How to determine whether a given name is available
- Which available name must be used in case of name conflicts (valid name)
- How scientific literature must cite names

Zoological nomenclature is independent of other systems of nomenclature, for example botanical nomenclature. This implies that animals can have the same generic names as plants (e.g. there is a genus Abronia in both animals and plants).

The rules and recommendations have one fundamental aim: to provide the maximum universality and continuity in the naming of all animals, except where taxonomic judgment dictates otherwise. The code is meant to guide only the nomenclature of animals, while leaving zoologists freedom in classifying new taxa. In other words, while species concepts (and thus the definition of species) are arbitrary to some degree, the rules for names are not. The code applies only to names. A new animal name published without adherence to the code may be deemed simply "unavailable" if it fails to meet certain criteria, or fall entirely out of the province of science (e.g., the "scientific name" for the Loch Ness Monster).

The rules in the code determine which available names are valid for any taxon in the family group, genus group, and species group. It has additional (but more limited) provisions on names in higher ranks. The code recognizes no case law. Any dispute is decided first by applying the code directly, and not by reference to precedent.

The code is also retroactive or retrospective, which means that previous editions of the code, or previous other rules and conventions have no force anymore today, and the nomenclatural acts published earlier must be evaluated only under the present edition of the code. In cases of disputes a case can be brought to the Commission who has the right to publish a final decision.

== Principles ==
In regulating the names of animals it holds by six central principles, which were first set out (as principles) in the third edition of the code (1985):

=== Principle of binominal nomenclature ===
This is the principle that the scientific name of a species, and not of a taxon at any other rank, is a combination of two names; the use of a trinomen for the name of a subspecies and of uninominal names for taxa above the species group is in accord with this principle.

This means that in the system of nomenclature for animals, the name of a species is composed of a combination of a generic name and a specific name; together they make a "binomen". No other rank can have a name composed of two names. Examples:

Species Giraffa camelopardalis

- Subspecies have a name composed of three names, a "trinomen": generic name, specific name, subspecific name:

Subspecies Giraffa camelopardalis rothschildi

- Taxa at a rank above species have a name composed of one name, a "uninominal name".

Genus Giraffa, family Giraffidae

In botanical nomenclature, the equivalent for "binominal nomenclature" is "binary nomenclature" (or sometimes "binomial nomenclature").

=== Principle of priority ===
This is the principle that the correct formal scientific name for an animal taxon, the valid name, correct to use, is the oldest available name that applies to it. It is the most important principle—the fundamental guiding precept that preserves zoological nomenclature stability. It was first formulated in 1842 by a committee appointed by the British Association to consider the rules of zoological nomenclature. Hugh Edwin Strickland wrote the committee's report.

Examples:

- Nunneley 1837 established Limax maculatus (Gastropoda), Wiktor 2001 classified it as a junior synonym of Limax maximus Linnaeus, 1758 from S and W Europe. Limax maximus was established first, so if Wiktor's 2001 classification is accepted, Limax maximus takes precedence over Limax maculatus and must be used for the species.
- Carl Linnaeus named the domestic cat Felis catus in 1758; Johann Christian Daniel von Schreber named the wildcat Felis silvestris in 1775. For taxonomists who consider these two kinds of cat a single species the principle of priority means that the species ought to be named F. catus, but in practice almost all biologists have used F. silvestris. In 2003, the Commission issued a ruling (Opinion 2027) that "conserved the usage of 17 specific names based on wild species, which are pre-dated by or contemporary with those based on domestic forms", confirming F. silvestris for the wild cat. Taxonomists who consider the domesticated cat the same species as the wild cat should use F. silvestris; those who consider it a subspecies of the wild cat should use F. silvestris catus; those who consider it a separate species should use F. catus.

There are over 2 million junior synonyms recorded in zoology, primarily at the species level.

=== Principle of coordination ===
The principle of coordination is that within the family group, genus group and species group, a name established for a taxon at any rank in the group is simultaneously established with the same author and date for taxa based on the same name-bearing type at other ranks in the corresponding group. In other words, publishing a new zoological name automatically and simultaneously establishes all corresponding names in the relevant other ranks with the same type.

In the species-group, publishing a species name (the binomen) Giraffa camelopardalis Linnaeus, 1758 also establishes the subspecies name (the trinomen) Giraffa camelopardalis camelopardalis Linnaeus, 1758. The same applies to the name of a subspecies; this establishes the corresponding species name, should anyone choose to elevate it to a full species at a later date.

In the genus-group, similarly, publishing the name of a genus also establishes the corresponding name of a subgenus (or vice versa): genus Giraffa Linnaeus, 1758 and subgenus Giraffa (Giraffa) Linnaeus, 1758.

In the family-group, publication of the name of a family, subfamily, superfamily, tribe (or any other such rank) also establishes the names in all the other ranks in the family group (family Giraffidae, superfamily Giraffoidea, subfamily Giraffinae, tribe Giraffini).

Author citations for such names (for example a subgenus) are the same as for the name actually published (for example a genus). It is immaterial if there is an actual taxon to which the automatically established name applies; if ever such a taxon is recognised, there is a name available for it. Later publications of similar names based on the same type but with different endings (e.g., "-inae" for subfamily versus "-idae" for family) are homonyms.

=== Principle of the First Reviser ===
This is the principle that in cases of conflicts between simultaneously published divergent acts, the first subsequent author can decide which has precedence. It supplements the principle of priority, which states that the first published name takes precedence. The principle of the First Reviser deals with situations that cannot be resolved by priority. These items may be two or more different names for the same taxon, two or more names with the same spelling used for different taxa, two or more different spellings of a particular name, etc. In such cases, the first subsequent author who deals with the matter and chooses and publishes the decision in the required manner is the First Reviser, and their choice is to be followed.

Example:

Linnaeus 1758 established Strix scandiaca and Strix noctua (Aves), for which he gave different descriptions and referred to different types, but both taxa later turned out to refer to the same species, the snowy owl. The two names are subjective synonyms. Lönnberg 1931 acted as First Reviser, citing both names and selecting Strix scandiaca to have precedence.

=== Principle of homonymy ===
This is the principle that the name of each taxon must be unique. Consequently, a name that is a junior homonym of another name must not be used as a valid name.

It means that any one animal name, in one particular spelling, may be used only once (within its group). This is usually the first-published name; any later name with the same spelling (a homonym) is barred from being used. The principles of priority and first reviser apply here. For family-group names the termination (which is rank-bound) is not taken into account.

Genera are homonyms only if exactly the same — a one-letter difference is enough to distinguish them.

Examples:

Argus Bohadsch, 1761 (Gastropoda) (was made available for homonymy by ICZN in Opinion 429, despite that Bohadsch 1761 was non-binominal - this had the effect that none of the various following names Argus can be used for a taxon)
Argus Scopoli, 1763 (Lepidoptera: Lycaenidae: Polyommatinae)
Argus Scopoli, 1777 (Lepidoptera: Nymphalidae: Satyrinae)
Argus Poli, 1791 (Bivalvia)
Argus Temminck, 1807 (Aves)
Argus Lamarck, 1817 (Lepidoptera: Hesperiidae)
Argus Walckenaer, 1836 (Araneae)
Argus Gerhard, 1850 (Lepidoptera: Lycaenidae: Theclinae)

The following are not homonyms of Argus:

Argua Walker, 1863 (Lepidoptera), Argusa Kelham, 1888 (Aves), Argusina Hebard, 1927 (Dermaptera), †Arcus Hong, 1983 (Diptera), Argas Latreille, 1795 (Araneae), Argulus Müller, 1785 (Crustacea).

The following names are not homonyms of each other:

Isomya Cutler & Cutler, 1985 (Sipunculida), Isomyia Walker, 1859 (Diptera).
Adelomya Mulsant & Verreaux, 1866 (Aves), Adelomyia Bonaparte, 1854 (Aves), †Adelomys Gervais, 1853 (Mammalia), †Adolomys Shevyreva, 1989 (Mammalia), Adulomya Kuroda, 1931 (Bivalvia).

Some spelling variants are explicitly defined by the Code as being homonyms. Otherwise the one-letter difference rule applies.

In species, primary homonyms are those with the same genus and same species in their original combination. The difference between a junior primary homonym and a subsequent use of a name is undefined, but it is commonly accepted that if the name referred to another species or form, gave a description, and if there is in addition no evidence the author knew that the name was previously used, it is considered as a junior homonym.

Example:

Scopoli (1763) established Curculio fasciatus (Coleoptera) for a species from Slovenia. Strøm (1768) established Curculio fasciatus for another species from Norway. De Geer (1775) established Curculio fasciatus for a 3rd species from Sweden. Müller (1776) established Curculio fasciatus for a 4th species from Denmark. Fourcroy (1785) established Curculio fasciatus for a 5th species from France. Olivier (1790) established Curculio fasciatus for a 6th species from France. Marsham (1802) established Curculio fasciatus for a 7th species from Britain. All these names had descriptions that clarified that different species were meant, and that their authors did not know that the name had been established by a previous author.

Typically, junior primary homonyms are permanently invalid, but some are treated as valid if the junior and senior homonyms have been in separate genera after 1899 (Art. 57.2.1, Art. 23.9).

Examples:

Olivier published the names Cerambyx elegans in 1790, and Cerambix [sic] maculatus in 1795, both of them junior primary homonyms. However, by 1835 both species were no longer in the genus Cerambyx, so both species names are presently treated as valid, as Mionochroma elegans and Stellognatha maculata, respectively.

Secondary homonyms occur when taxa with the same specific name but different original genera are later classified in the same genus (Art. 57.3, 59). A secondary homonym may only be a temporary state, as it only applies so long as two species are congeneric. Under a different classification, the two species may no longer be in the same genus, and the junior name can potentially be used again (Art. 59.1), as long as it was not replaced before 1961, in which case it is permanently invalid (Art. 59.3). This is one of the rare cases where a single zoological species can have two entirely different names at the same time, depending upon whose classification is followed.

Example:

Nunneley (1837) established Limax maculatus (Gastropoda), Wiktor (2001) classified it as a junior synonym of Limax (Limax) maximus Linnaeus, 1758 from S and W Europe. Kaleniczenko, 1851 established Krynickillus maculatus for a different species from Ukraine. Wiktor, 2001 classified both Limax maximus Linnaeus, 1758 and Krynickillus maculatus Kaleniczenko, 1851 in the genus Limax. This meant that L. maculatus Nunneley, 1837 and K. maculatus Kaleniczenko, 1851 were classified in the same genus, so both names were secondary homonyms in the genus Limax, and the younger name (from 1851) could not be used for the Ukrainian species. This made it necessary to look for the next younger available name that could be used for the Ukrainian species. This was Limax ecarinatus Boettger, 1881, a junior synonym of K. maculatus Kaleniczenko, 1851.
For Wiktor (2001) and those authors who follow Wiktor's system the name of the Ukrainian species must be Limax ecarinatus Boettger, 1881. For the others who classify Limacus as a separate genus, the name of the Ukrainian species must be Limacus maculatus (Kaleniczenko, 1851).
So the Ukrainian species can have two names, depending from its generic classification. Limax ecarinatus, Limacus maculatus, the same species.

Article 59.3 states that junior secondary homonyms replaced before 1961 by substitute names are permanently invalid unless the substitute name is itself not in use.

Example:

Glischrus caelatus Studer, 1820 (Gastropoda) was once classified in the genus Helix, and became a junior secondary homonym of Helix caelata [Vallot], 1801. Locard (1880) established a replacement name Helix glypta, which has very rarely been used. The species is now known as Trochulus caelatus (Studer, 1820), and Art. 59.3 is commonly ignored. (Note: The publication by [Vallot] (1801) has not been unambiguously recognized as published work in the sense of the Code Art. 8, which might be another reason to ignore Art. 59.3 in this case.)

Double homonymy (genus and species) may or may not be homonymy in the strict sense: if the genera are homonyms but not the same genus, the same specific names can be used in both groups, because the species are subsequently placed in different genera when the generic homonymy is removed.

Example:

The name Noctua Linnaeus, 1758 was established for a group of moths. In 1766 he established Noctua Linné, 1766 for a group of birds, ignoring that he had already used this name a few years ago. Noctua Linné, 1766 (Aves) is a junior homonym of Noctua Linnaeus, 1758 (Lepidoptera), and is permanently invalid.
Noctua variegata (Lepidoptera) was coined by Jung, 1792, and Noctua variegata (Aves) by Quoy & Gaimard, 1830, thus creating a double homonym, until the latter species was placed in a different genus. Both species names are valid.

For disambiguating one genus-group name from its homonym, it is important to cite author and year. Citing the author alone is often not sufficient.

Examples:

Echidna Forster, 1777 (Actinopterygii), not Echidna Cuvier, 1797 (Mammalia)
Ansa Walker, 1858 (Lepidoptera), not Ansa Walker, 1868 (Hemiptera)
Helix balcanica Kobelt, 1876, not Helix balcanica Kobelt, 1903 (both Gastropoda)
Conus catenatus Sowerby, 1850, not Conus catenatus Sowerby, 1875 (both Gastropoda)

In some cases, the same genus-group or species-group name was published in the same year by the same author. In these cases it is useful to cite the page where the name was established.

Amydona Walker, 1855 (Lepidoptera: Limacodidae) (p. 1110), not Amydona Walker, 1855 (Lepidoptera: Lasiocampidae) (p. 1413)
Betousa Walker, 1865 (Lepidoptera: Thyrididae) (p. 1111), not Betousa Walker, 1865 (Lepidoptera: Noctuidae) (p. 1208).
Cicada variegata Fabricius, 1775 (p. 684), not Cicada variegata Fabricius, 1775 (p. 686) (both Auchenorrhyncha).
Noctua marginata Fabricius, 1775 (p. 597), not Noctua marginata Fabricius, 1775 (p. 610) (both Lepidoptera: Noctuidae).
Clausilia (Albinaria) oertzeni Boettger, 1889 (p. 42), not Clausilia (Albinaria) schuchi var. oertzeni Boettger, 1889 (p. 52) (both Gastropoda: Clausiliidae).

There are cases where two homonyms were established by the same author in the same year on the same page:

Zonites verticillus var. graeca Kobelt, 1876 (Gastropoda) (p. 48), not Zonites albanicus var. graeca Kobelt, 1876 (p. 48).

Homonyms occur relatively rarely in families (only if generic names are identical or very similar and adding an ending "-idae" produces identical results). Discovering such a homonymy usually produces the same problems as if there were no rules: conflicts between entirely independent and unconnected groups of taxonomists working in different animal groups. Very often the Commission must be asked to take a decision.

Examples:

Bulimina (Foraminifera) and Buliminus (Gastropoda) both give Buliminidae, and both families were used since the 1880s. When the homonymy was discovered 110 years later in the 1990s, the younger (gastropod) taxon had to receive a new family name, and the Commission was asked for a solution (Opinion 2018).
Claria (Rotifera) and Clarias (Actinopterygii) both give Clariidae, but only the actinopterygian fish name had been used since 1845. Shortly after Clariidae had been proposed in Rotifera in 1990, the homonymy was discovered and the Commission ruled that the rotiferan family had to be emended to Clariaidae (Opinion 2032).

For names above the superfamily level, the principle of homonymy does not apply.

Examples:

Pulmonata is usually used for a very prominent group in Gastropoda, but the name is also (rarely) used for a group in Arachnida.
Reticulata is used as an order in Foraminifera, and as an undefined higher group in Ephemeroptera.

Family-rank names and genus-rank names cannot be homonyms of one another, even if identical.

Example:

The frog superfamily Ranoidea and the frog genus Ranoidea are not homonyms.

Animal, plant, and fungi nomenclature are entirely independent from each other. The most evident shortcoming of this situation (for their use in biodiversity informatics) is that the same generic name can be used simultaneously for animals and plants. For this kind of homonym the expression "hemihomonym" is sometimes used. Far more than 1000 such names are known.

Examples:

The genus Tandonia was established in animals (Gastropoda), in plants (Euphorbiaceae), and in Fungi (Ascomycetes).
Prominent plant/animal pairings: Ammophila (Poaceae and Hymenoptera), Arenaria (Caryophyllaceae and Aves), Betula (Betulaceae and Hymenoptera), Chloris (Cactaceae and Aves), Dryas (Rosaceae and Lepidoptera), Dugesia (Asteraceae and Platyhelminthes), Erica (Ericaceae and Araneae), Hystrix (Poaceae and Mammalia), Iris (Iridaceae and Orthoptera), Liparis (Orchidaceae and Actinopterygii), Phalaenopsis (Orchidaceae and Aves), Pinus (Pinaceae and Mollusca), Prunella (Lamiaceae and Aves), Ricinus (Euphorbiaceae and Psocodea), Taxus (Taxaceae and Mammalia), Typha (Typhaceae and Porifera), Ulva (Ulvophyceae and Lepidoptera), Viola (Violaceae and Lepidoptera).

=== Principle of typification ===
This is the principle that each nominal taxon in the family group, genus group, or species group has—actually or potentially—a name-bearing type fixed that provides the objective standard of reference that determines what the name applies to.

This means that any named taxon has a name-bearing type, which allows the objective application of that name. Any family-group name must have a type genus, any genus-group name must have a type species, and any species-group name can (not must) have one or more type specimens (holotype, lectotype, neotype, syntypes, or others), usually deposited in a museum collection. The type genus for a family-group name is simply the genus that provided the stem to which was added the ending "-idae" (for families). Example:

The family name Spheniscidae has as its type genus the genus Spheniscus Brisson, 1760.

The type species for a genus-group name is more complicated and follows exactly defined provisions in articles 67–69. Type species are very important, and no general zoological database has recorded the type species for all genera. Except in fishes and some minor groups, type species are rarely reliably recorded in online animal databases. In 60% of the cases the type species can be determined in the original publication. The type species is always the original name of the taxon (and not the currently used combination).

Example:

The correctly cited type species of Locusta Linnaeus, 1758 (Caelifera) is Gryllus migratorius Linnaeus, 1758, not Locusta migratoria (Linnaeus, 1758).

Designation and fixation have different meanings. A designation is the proposal of the type species. It is not necessary to have spelled the name of the genus or species correctly with correct authors (articles 67.2.1, 67.6, 67.7), type species are always the correctly spelled name. If the designation is valid, the type species is fixed.

A designation can also be invalid and ineffective—for example—if the genus had already a previously fixed type species, or if a type species was proposed that was not originally included, or contradicted the description or figure for a genus for which no species had originally been included.

There are various possible modes of type species designation. This is their order of legal importance, with approximate proportions of occurrence (Note: These proportions apply to 366 verified European non-marine mollusc genera ([www.animalbase.org]), presumed to represent a more-or-less representative animal group.) and examples:

- Superior type fixation:

Designation by ICZN under the plenary powers (3%)

Example:
Galba Schrank, 1803 (Gastropoda) was established with one species included, Galba pusilla Schrank, 1803. This would be the type species by monotypy. In Opinion 1896 (published in 1998) this type fixation was set aside and Buccinum truncatulum Müller, 1774 was fixed as type species under the plenary power(s) (now Galba truncatula).

Designation under Art. 70.3 (misidentified type species) (1%)

Examples:
Bollingeria Forcart, 1940 (Gastropoda) was established with its type species Chondrus pupoides Krynicki, 1833 proposed by original designation. But Forcart 1940 misidentified the type species and meant Bulimus lamelliferus Rossmässler, 1858. It would be convenient to designate Bulimus lamelliferus as type species under Art. 70.3.
Helisoma Swainson, 1840 (Gastropoda) was established with one species included, cited by Swainson as "H. bicarinata Sow. Gen. f. 4". This suggested that the type species was misidentified, and that Planorbis campanulatus Say, 1821 and not Planorbis bicarinatus Say, 1819 was meant. But since the incorrect type species Planorbis bicarinatus has been regarded as type, it would be convenient to fix this as type under Art. 70.3.

- Type fixation in the original work:

Original designation (31%)

Examples:
Montfort 1810 established the genus Theodoxus (Gastropoda) and designated Theodoxus lutetianus Montfort 1810 as type species (now Theodoxus fluviatilis).
Vest 1867 established the subgenus Clausilia (Isabellaria) (Gastropoda) and designated Clausilia isabellina Pfeiffer, 1842 as type species (now Isabellaria isabellina).
Riedel 1987 established the genus Turcozonites (Gastropoda) and designated Zonites wandae Riedel, 1982 as type species (now Turcozonites wandae).

Monotypy (28%)

Examples:
Anodonta Lamarck, 1799 (Bivalvia) was originally established with one included nominal species, Mytilus cygneus Linnaeus, 1758. This is the type species fixed by monotypy (now Anodonta cygnea).
Microcondylaea Vest 1866 (Bivalvia) was originally established with two included nominal species, Unio bonellii Férussac, 1827 and with doubts Anodonta lata Rafinesque, 1820. Doubtfully included species do not count, type species is Unio bonellii fixed by monotypy (now Microcondylaea bonellii).

Absolute tautonymy (2%)

Examples:
Kobelt 1871 established the gastropod genus-group name Candidula and included 23 species. Among these was Glischrus candidula Studer 1820. Glischrus candidula is type species fixed by absolute tautonymy (now Candidula unifasciata).
Draparnaud 1801 established the gastropod genus Succinea and included two species, Succinea amphibia Draparnaud 1801 and Succinea oblonga Draparnaud 1801. Among the synonyms of S. amphibia, Draparnaud listed a name Helix succinea Müller 1774. Synonyms do count here, so Helix succinea is type species by absolute tautonymy (now Succinea putris).
Kobelt 1904 established the gastropod subgenus Iberus (Balearica) and included 10 species. Among these was Helix balearica Rossmässler 1838, which Kobelt cited as Iberus (Balearica) balearicus. The ending -us is irrelevant here, Helix balearica is type species by absolute tautonymy (currently Iberellus balearicus or Iberellus hispanicus).
Euxinolauria Lindholm, 1924 (Gastropoda: Lauriidae) was established as a new replacement name for Caucasica Caziot & Margier, 1909 (not Caucasica Boettger, 1877 (Gastropoda: Clausiliidae)). Caucasica Caziot & Margier, 1909 contained originally four species, among which was Pupa caucasica Pfeiffer, 1857. This is the type species for Caucasica Caziot & Margier, 1909 fixed by absolute tautonymy, and also for Euxinolauria (now Euxinolauria caucasica).
The following examples do not represent absolute tautonymy: Scomber scombrus Linnaeus, 1758 (Actinopterygii), Babyrousa babyrussa (Linnaeus, 1758) (Mammalia), Suricata suricatta (Schreber, 1776) (Mammalia), Merlangius merlangus (Linnaeus, 1758) (Actinopterygii), Isabellaria isabellina (Pfeiffer, 1842) (Gastropoda), Rupestrella rupestris (Philippi, 1836) (Gastropoda).

Linnean tautonymy (0.3%)

Example:
Linnaeus 1758 established Castor (Mammalia) and included two species, Castor fiber and Castor moschatus. Among the synonyms of Castor fiber was cited the one-word name Castor with references to six pre-Linnean works (Gesner 1598, Rondelet 1554, Jonston 1650, Dodart 1676, Ray 1693 and Aldrovandi 1649). Castor fiber Linnaeus 1758 is type species fixed by Linnean tautonymy (now Castor fiber).

- Subsequent methods of type fixation:

Subsequent monotypy (2%)

Examples:
Valvata Müller, 1773 (Gastropoda) was established with a short description and without species. Müller 1774 included one species Valvata cristata Müller 1774. Valvata cristata is type species by subsequent monotypy (now Valvata cristata).
Omphiscola Rafinesque, 1819 (Gastropoda) was established without species included. Beck 1837 [1838] included one species Buccinum glabrum Müller, 1774. Buccinum glabrum is type species by subsequent monotypy (now Omphiscola glabra).

Subsequent absolute tautonymy (only very few cases) (Note: Subsequent absolute tautonymy" is not used as a term in the Code's fourth edition, but it is a logical consequence of the usage of the term "subsequent monotypy".)

Examples:
Alosa Garsault, 1764 (Actinopterygii) was established without included species. As first author, Cuvier, 1829 included two species Clupea alosa and Clupea fincta. Type species is Clupea alosa Linnaeus 1758 by subsequent absolute tautonymy (now Alosa alosa).
Rupicapra Garsault, 1764 (Mammalia) was established without included species. As first author, Blainville, 1816 included three species Capra rupicapra Linnaeus, 1758, Capra pudu, and Capra americana. Type species is Capra rupicapra by subsequent absolute tautonymy (now Rupicapra rupicapra).

Subsequent Linnean tautonymy (only theoretical, there might be no case)
Subsequent designation (32%)

Examples:
Aplexa Fleming, 1820 (Gastropoda) was established with two species, Bulla hypnorum Linnaeus, 1758 and Bulla rivalis Turton, 1807. Herrmannsen 1846 fixed Bulla hypnorum as type by subsequent designation (now Aplexa hypnorum).
Pseudanodonta Bourguignat 1877 (Bivalvia) was established with seven species, Anodonta complanata Rossmässler 1835, and six others. Westerlund 1902 validly designated Anodonta complanata as type species (now Pseudanodonta complanata).

A species-group name can have a name-bearing type specimen, but this is not a requirement. In many cases species-group names have no type specimens, or they are lost. In those cases the application of the species-group name is usually based on common acceptance. If there is no common acceptance, there are provisions in the Code to fix a name-bearing type specimen that is binding for users of that name. Fixing such a name-bearing type should only be done if this is taxonomically necessary (articles 74.7.3, 75.2, 75.3).

Examples:

Aptenodytes patagonica Miller, 1778 is either based on a type specimen, perhaps deposited in the Natural History Museum London or somewhere else, or its type is lost. This is now irrelevant because the usage of the name (as Aptenodytes patagonicus) for the king penguin is unambiguously accepted.
The name-bearing type for Homo sapiens Linnaeus, 1758 is deposited in Uppsala (the bones of Carl von Linné). This is a lectotype designated by Stearn 1959, correctly but unnecessarily because the usage of the name was unambiguous at that time, and still is.

== Structure ==
The code divides names in the following manner:

- Names above the family group
- Family-group names
- Genus-group names
- Species-group names

The names above the family group are regulated only as to the requirements for publication; there is no restriction to the number of ranks and the use of names is not restricted by priority.

The names in the family, genus, and species groups are fully regulated by the provisions in the code. There is no limitation to the number of ranks allowed in the family group. The genus group has only two ranks: genus and subgenus. The species group has only two ranks: species and subspecies.

=== Gender agreement ===
In the species group gender agreement applies. If the name of a species, in two parts, a binomen, say, Loxodonta africana, or of a subspecies, in three parts, a trinomen, for example, Canis lupus albus, is in the form of a Latin or latinized Greek phrase, it must be grammatically correct Latin. If the second part, the specific name (or the third part, the subspecific name) is adjectival in nature, and has multiple variants based upon grammatical gender, then its spelling must agree in gender with the name of the genus. If it is a noun, or an arbitrary combination of letters, this does not apply.

If a species is moved, the spelling of an ending may need to change. When Gryllus migratorius was moved to the genus Locusta, it became Locusta migratoria. Confusion over Latin grammar has led to many incorrectly formed names appearing in print. An automated search may fail to find all the variant spellings of a given name (e.g., the spellings atra and ater may refer to the same species). Words that may be either nouns or adjectives (e.g., nanus, sagittarius) are treated as nouns by default; i.e., in the absence of an explicit statement that they were intended to be adjectival. Compound words in which one or more components are nouns are defined as "noun phrases" and do not change spelling (e.g., leucocephalus, nigritarsus).

- For instance, the generic name Equus is masculine; in the name Equus africanus, the specific name africanus is an adjective and its ending follows the gender of the generic name.
- In Equus ferus the specific name ferus can be either a noun or an adjective, and since the original author did not specify which was intended, under the ICZN it is a noun.
- In Equus hemionus the specific name hemionus is a compound with one component being a noun ("onus", from Greek, for a donkey), so under the ICZN it is a noun.
- In Equus zebra the specific name zebra is a noun, it may not be "corrected" to "Equus zebrus".
- In Equus quagga burchellii the subspecific name burchellii is a noun in the genitive case ("of Burchell").

== History ==
Written nomenclatural rules in zoology were compiled in various countries since the late 1830s, such as Merton's Rules and Strickland's Code going back to 1843. At the first and second International Zoological Congresses (Paris 1889, Moscow 1892) zoologists saw the need to establish commonly accepted international rules for all disciplines and countries to replace conventions and unwritten rules that varied across disciplines, countries, and languages.

Compiling "International Rules on Zoological Nomenclature" was first proposed in 1895 in Leiden (3rd International Congress for Zoology) and officially published in three languages in 1905 (French, English, German; only French was official). From then on, amendments and modifications were subsequently passed by various zoological congresses (Boston 1907, Graz 1910, Monaco 1913, Budapest 1927, Padua 1930, Paris 1948, Copenhagen 1953, and London 1958). These were only published in English, and can only be found in the reports of these congresses or other official publications.

The 1905 rules became increasingly outdated. They soon sold out, and it became increasingly difficult to obtain a complete set of the Rules with all amendments. In Copenhagen 1953 the French and English texts of the rules were declared of equivalent official force, and a declaration was approved to prepare a new compilation of the rules. In 1958, an Editorial Committee in London elaborated a completely new version of the nomenclatural rules, which were finally published as the first edition of the ICZN Code on 9 November 1961.

The second edition of the code (only weakly modified) came in 1963. The last zoological congress to deal with nomenclatural problems took place in Monte Carlo 1972, since by then the official zoological organs no longer derived power from zoological congresses. The third edition of the code came out in 1985. The present edition is the 4th edition, effective since 2000. These code editions were elaborated on by editorial committees appointed by the International Commission on Zoological Nomenclature. The ICZN Commission takes its power from a general biological congress (IUBS, International Union of Biological Sciences). The editorial committee for the fourth edition was composed of seven persons. Such new editions of the ICZN Code are approved by the taxonomic community through a one-year "window" open for comments, and taxonomists have the right to vote for the members of the Commission.

As the Commission may alter the code (by declarations and amendments) without issuing a new edition of the book, the current edition does not necessarily contain the actual provision that applies in a particular case. The Code consists of the original text of the fourth edition and Declaration 44. The code is published in an English and a French version; both versions are official and equivalent in force, meaning, and authority. This means that if something in the English code is unclear or its interpretation ambiguous, the French version is decisive, and if there is something unclear in the French code, the English version is decisive.

== Commission ==
The rules in the code apply to all users of zoological names. However, its provisions can be interpreted, waived, or modified in their application to a particular case when strict adherence would cause confusion. Such exceptions are not made by an individual scientist, no matter how well-respected within the field, but only by the International Commission on Zoological Nomenclature, acting on behalf of all zoologists. The Commission takes such action in response to proposals submitted to it.

== Electronic publications ==
The latest amendments (specifically A-2012) enacted by the Commission concern electronic publishing, which is now permitted for works published under an ISBN or ISSN after 2011 in a way that requires registration with ZooBank as well as archival of multiple copies.

== Local usage and name changes ==
The ICZN is used by the scientific community worldwide. Changes are governed by guidelines in the code. Local changes, such as the changes proposed by the Turkish government, are not recognised by the ICZN.

== Citation ==
The current (fourth edition) code is cited in scientific papers as ICZN (1999) and in reference lists as:

ICZN 1999. International Code of Zoological Nomenclature. Fourth Edition. The International Trust for Zoological Nomenclature, London, UK. 306 pp.

== Versions ==
- Strickland, H.E. [et al.] 1843. Report of a committee appointed "to consider of the rules by which the Nomenclature of Zoology may be established on a Uniform and Permanent Basis." ["The Strickland Code".] In: Report of 12th Meeting of the British Association for the Advancement of Science, June 1842, p. 105-121. BHL. [Also published in the Philosophical Magazine and the Annals of Natural History.]
- Strickland, H.E. 1878. Rules for Zoological Nomenclature. John Murray, London. Internet Archive.
- Blanchard, R., Maehrenthal, F. von & Stiles, C. W. 1905. Règles internationales de la nomenclature zoologique adoptées par les Congrès Internationaux de Zoologie. International Rules of Zoological Nomenclature. Internationale Regeln der Zoologischen Nomenklatur. Rudeval, Paris. Google Books.
- ICZN. 1961. International Code of Zoological Nomenclature: adopted by the XV International Congress of Zoology. The International Trust for Zoological Nomenclature, London, UK. BHL.
- ICZN. 1964. International Code of Zoological Nomenclature. Second edition. The International Trust for Zoological Nomenclature, London, UK. BHL.
- ICZN. 1985. International Code of Zoological Nomenclature. Third edition. The International Trust for Zoological Nomenclature, London, UK. BHL.
- ICZN. 1999. International Code of Zoological Nomenclature. Fourth edition. The International Trust for Zoological Nomenclature, London, UK. BHL. The Code Online (ICZN).

== See also ==
- Author citation (zoology)
- Emendation (zoology)
- Incorrect subsequent spelling
- Nomen dubium
- Nomen nudum
- Nomen oblitum
- List of authors of names published under the ICZN
- International Code of Nomenclature for algae, fungi, and plants (ICNafp)
