= Abronia gens =

Ancient Roman family

The gens Abronia was an obscure plebeian family at ancient Rome. The only members of this gens mentioned by Roman writers are Abronius Silo, a Latin poet during the time of Augustus, and his son, who was the author of pantomimes. Epigraphic sources provide a few other instances of this nomen, but the readings are very uncertain, and it is possible that Abronius is merely an orthographic variation of Apronius.

== Members ==
- Abronius Silo, the Latin poet, was one of the students of the rhetorician Marcus Porcius Latro. He flourished during the later years of the emperor Augustus.
- Abronius Silo, son of the poet Abronius Silo, was likewise a poet, but Seneca reports that he wrote for pantomimes, which were considered a form of low culture.
- Abronia Quinta, named in a first-century inscription from Dume in Hispania, along with Abronius Reburrus. In both instances, the nomen is uncertain.
- Abronius Reburrus, named in a first-century inscription from Dume, along with Abronia Quinta. In both instances, the nomen is uncertain.
- Gaius Abronius Car[...], a name of uncertain reading that occurs in two inscriptions from Vitudurum in Germania Superior, dating from around the reign of Claudius.

== See also ==
- List of Roman gentes

== Bibliography ==
- Lucius Annaeus Seneca (Seneca the Elder), Suasoriae (Rhetorical Exercises).
- Dictionary of Greek and Roman Biography and Mythology, William Smith, ed., Little, Brown and Company, Boston (1849).
- René Cagnat et alii, L'Année épigraphique (The Year in Epigraphy, abbreviated AE), Presses Universitaires de France (1888–present).
