= Leonhard Stejneger =

Biologist

Leonhard Hess Stejneger
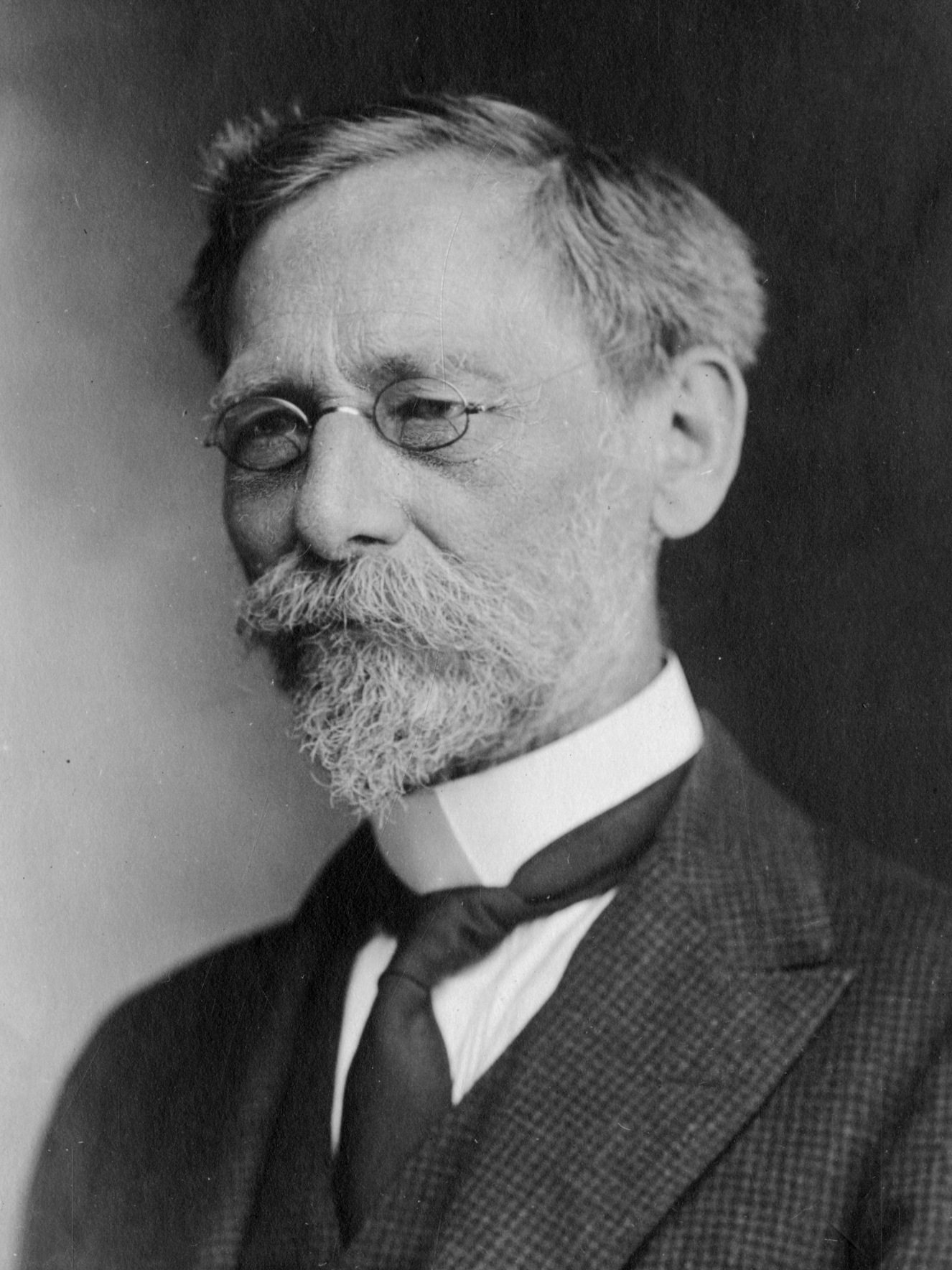
- Stejneger, c. 1910s
- Born: October 30, 1851; Bergen, Norway
- Died: February 28, 1943 (aged 91); Washington, D.C.
- Education: Ph.D., University of Christiania
- Scientific career
- Fields: Ornithologist, herpetologist
- Author abbrev. (zoology): Stejneger

Leonhard Hess Stejneger (30 October 1851 – 28 February 1943) was a Norwegian-born American ornithologist, herpetologist and zoologist. Stejneger specialized in vertebrate natural history studies. He gained his greatest reputation with reptiles and amphibians.

== Early life and family ==
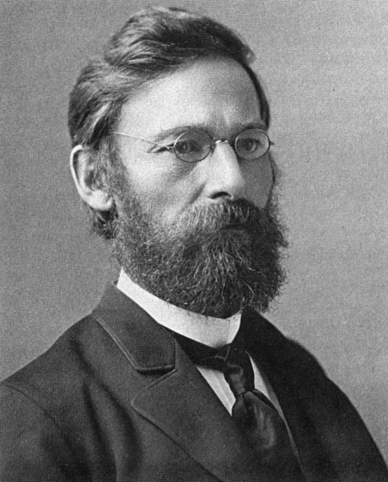
Stejneger in 1902

Stejneger was born in Bergen, Norway. His father was Peter Stamer Steineger, a merchant and auditor; his mother was Ingeborg Catharine (née Hess). Leonhard was the eldest of seven children. His sister Agnes Steineger was a Norwegian artist. Until 1880, the Steineger family had been one of the wealthy families in Bergen; at that time business reverses led to the father declaring bankruptcy.

Stejneger attended the Smith Theological School in Bergen from 1859 to 1860, and Bergen Latin School until 1869. His interests in zoology developed early. By age sixteen, he had a printed catalogue of birds, and he painted birds in water color. He moved with his mother to Meran in South Tyrol and studied under a private tutor. Around 1870, he began to spell his surname "Stejneger" and continued to use that spelling for the rest of his life. He studied law and philosophy at the University of Christiania. He earned a Ph.D. and started a brief career as a lawyer.

== Career ==
In 1880, Stejneger ordered a walking cane with a built-in collector's gun which would serve him in his specimen collection until the end of his life. In 1881, Stejneger moved to the United States on the advice of Jean Cabanis. He had married Anna Norman in 1876 but she chose not to move to the United States and they separated and later divorced. On arriving in the US, he immediately went to the Smithsonian Institution to meet Spencer Fullerton Baird after taking some time sitting in a park to brush up on his English vocabulary. Baird had been in communication and knew his competence and he began to work soon after. Stejneger became an American citizen in 1887. Stejneger participated in numerous expeditions to the northern parts of the North American continent. From 1882 to 1883, he was on an exploration mission to Bering Island and Kamchatka. In 1895, he went to the Commander Islands, studying fur seals for the U.S. Fish Commission. He returned there a second time in 1922.

Within the Smithsonian Institution, he moved up the career ladder. In 1884 he was Assistant Curator for birds, in 1889 Curator for reptiles, in 1899 Curator for reptiles and amphibians, and from 1911 on Head Curator for biology, a post he held until his death, having been exempted from retirement by a presidential decree.

Stejneger published more than 400 scientific works on birds, reptiles, seals, the herpetology of Puerto Rico, and other topics.

During his Bering Island trip, he became fascinated by the life of Georg Wilhelm Steller, an 18th-century naturalist who had previously visited there. He thoroughly researched Steller's life over the next few decades, a hobby which culminated in his only non-scientific publication, an authoritative Steller biography published in 1936.

Stejneger was a Life Member of the Bergen Museum. He attended the International Congresses of Zoology of 1898, 1901, 1904, 1907, 1913, 1927, and 1930, as well as ornithological and fisheries congresses. He was elected to the International Committee on Zoological Nomenclature in 1898 and served as the organizing secretary for the Section on Zoogeography at the 1907 International Zoological Congress (VII) in Boston. In 1900, he was awarded a gold medal at the Paris Exposition for his work on fur seals management and conservation. In 1923, Stejneger was elected to the National Academy of Sciences. In 1931, he was made honorary president for life of the American Society of Ichthyologists and Herpetologists. In 1906, he was made knight of the Royal Norwegian Order of St. Olaf and then in 1939 Commander of the same order.

== Legacy ==
Stejneger is commemorated in the scientific names of 13 reptiles (ten species and three subspecies): Amphisbaena stejnegeri, Aspidoscelis tigris stejnegeri, Crotalus stejnegeri, Gloydius intermedius stejnegeri, Hemidactylus stejnegeri, Pseudoxenodon stejnegeri, Rhinotyphlops stejnegeri, Sceloporus stejnegeri, Sphaerodactylus cinereus stejnegeri, Takydromus stejnegeri, Trachemys stejnegeri, Trimeresurus stejnegeri, and Uta stansburiana stejnegeri. He is also commemorated in several bird species including Mellanitta stejnegeri and Saxicola stejnegeri, and his name is also in the English common names of a cetacean, Stejneger's beaked whale, and a bird, Stejneger's petrel.

== Selected bibliography ==
For a complete list of all papers, see Wetmore (1945). Some of his major works include:

- Results of Ornithological Explorations in the Commander Islands and in Kamtschatka (1885)
- Birds of Kauai Island, Hawaiian Archipelago / collected by Mr. Valdemar Knudsen, with description of new species (1887)
- Notes on a third collection of birds made in Kauai, Hawaiian Islands (1890)
- The Poisonous Snakes of North America (1895)
- The Russian Fur-Seal Islands (1896)
- Herpetology of Porto Rico (1904)
- Herpetology of Japan and Adjacent Territories (1907)
- A new Gerrhonotine Lizard from Costa Rica (1907)
- Three new species of lizards from the Philippine Islands (1908)
- A new genus and species of lizard from Florida (1911)
- A new Scincid Lizard from the Philippine Islands (1911)
- Results of the Yale Peruvian Expedition of 1911. Batrachians and Reptiles (1913)
- A Check List of North American Amphibians and Reptiles [with Thomas Barbour] (1917)
- A chapter in the history of zoological nomenclature (1924)
- Fur-seal industry of the Commander Islands: 1897–1922 (1925)
- Identity of Hallowell's snake genera, Megalops and Aepidea (1927)
- The Chinese lizards of the genus Gekko (1934)
- Georg Wilhelm Steller, the pioneer of Alaskan natural history (1936)
