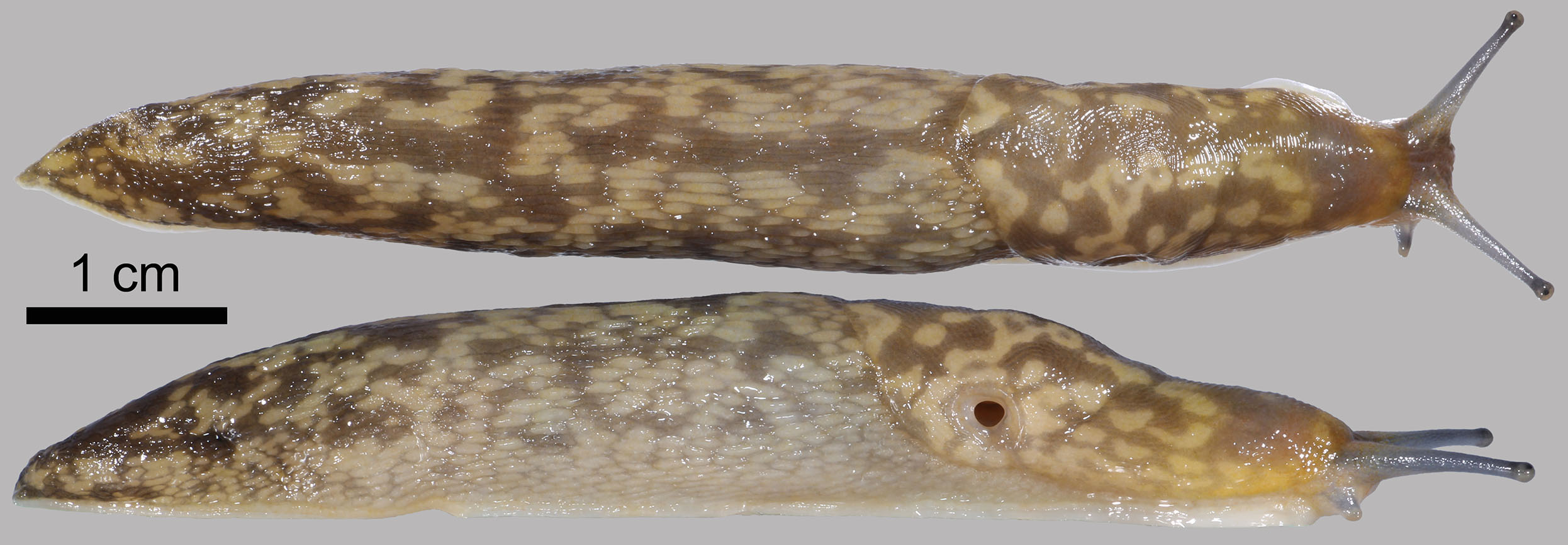

Conservation status
- Least Concern (IUCN 3.1)

Scientific classification
- Kingdom: Animalia
- Phylum: Mollusca
- Class: Gastropoda
- Order: Stylommatophora
- Family: Limacidae
- Genus: Limacus
- Species: L. maculatus

Binomial name
- Limacus maculatus (Kaleniczenko, 1851)

Synonyms
- Krynickillus maculatus Kaleniczenko, 1851; Limax maculatus (Kaleniczenko, 1851); Limax ecarinatus O. Boettger, 1881; Limax grossui Lupu, 1970; Limax pseudoflavus Evans, 1978

= Limacus maculatus =

Species of gastropod

Limacus maculatus, the green cellar slug or Irish yellow slug, is a species of slug native to the Caucasus and Black Sea coast. It has also been introduced to a number of northern European countries. In its introduced range the species is often synanthropic. It is most likely to be confused with Limacus flavus, which it closely resembles externally. The species has a complex taxonomic history, having been described under several different names, including Limax ecarinatus, Limax grossui, and Limax pseudoflavus.

== Taxonomy ==
Formerly, Limax ecarinatus Boettger, 1881 was the appropriate name if Limacus was considered a subgenus of Limax. The reason is that Nunneley had already described a Limax maculatus in 1837; this turned out to be a synonym of Limax maximus, but nevertheless the combination Limax maculatus could not be reapplied to a species described under the name maculatus at a later date (even though that 1851 description used a different genus, Krynickillus). However, a 2016 ruling by the International Commission on Zoological Nomenclature has suppressed the earlier usages of Limax maculatus, making Limax maculatus now the correct name if the species is placed in the genus Limax.

In the 1970s the same species was twice described again, under the names Limax grossui (from Romania) and Limax pseudoflavus (from Ireland).

== Identification ==
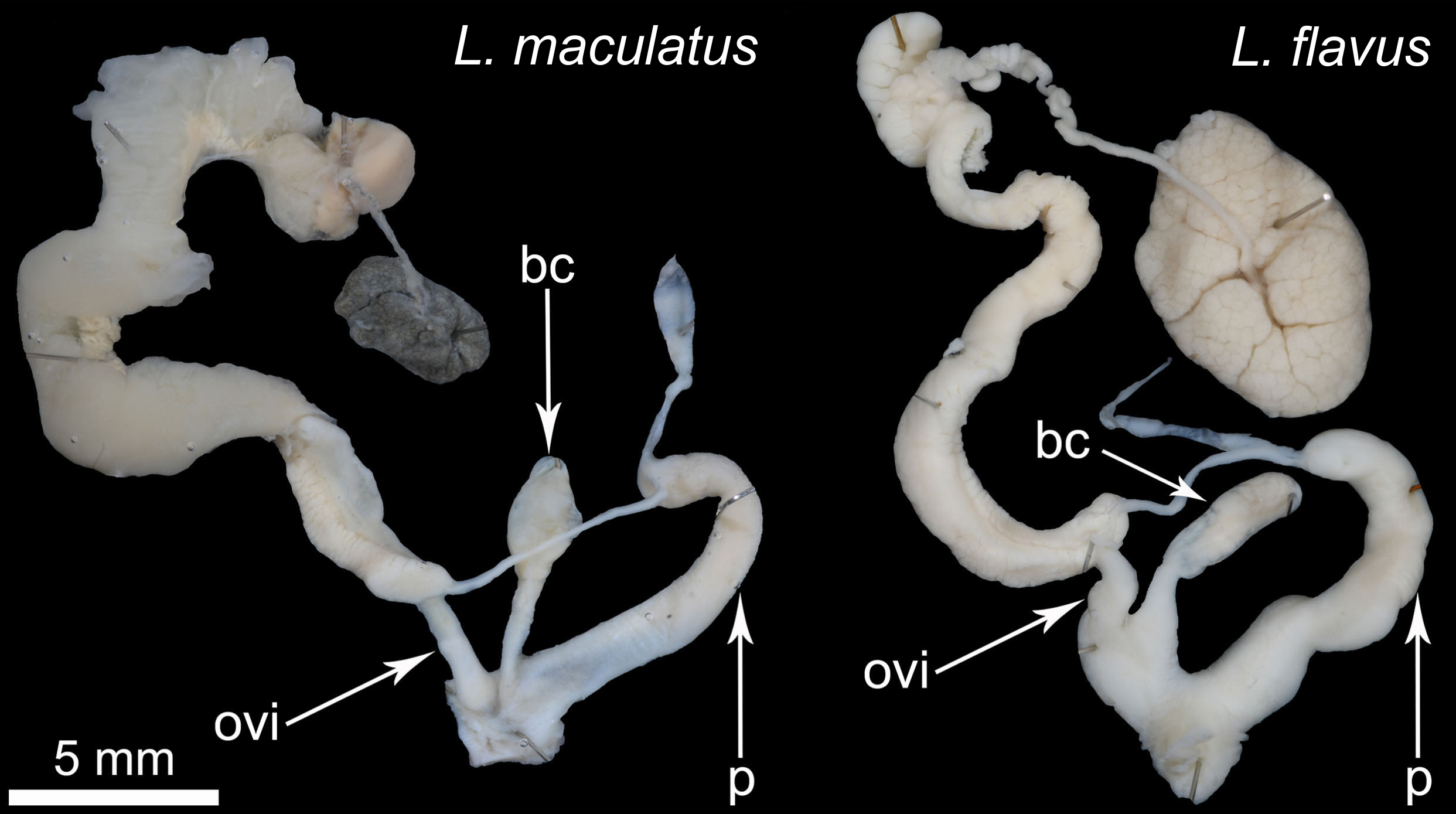
Genitalia of the two Limacus species; bc = bursa copulatrix, p = penis, ovi = free oviduct

Limacus maculatus and L. flavus are both large species of slug (up to 130 mm) with a yellow colouration, mottled with darker blotches; the tentacles are blue-grey. Juveniles are much darker. Like other limacid slugs, the tail is pointed and the pneumostome lies in the hind part of the mantle. The mucus is yellow or colourless.

The most reliable character to distinguish L. maculatus from L. flavus is where the duct of the bursa copulatrix attaches. It attaches to the base of the penis or to the atrium in L. maculatus, but some distance along the free oviduct in L. flavus.

External characters proposed to distinguish the species appear to be less consistent but may be useful in particular regions or as a preliminary indication. For instance in the British Isles L. flavus differs from L. maculatus in having a pale line along the midline of the back, but this is not consistenly present in Ukrainian populations. Claims that the dark pigment extends further ventrally down the flanks in L. maculatus are contradicted by British and Dutch specimens.

In the British Isles, apparently hybridisation has given rise to individuals with the genital characters of L. flavus but the mitochondrial DNA sequences of L. maculatus.

== Distribution, spread and habitat ==
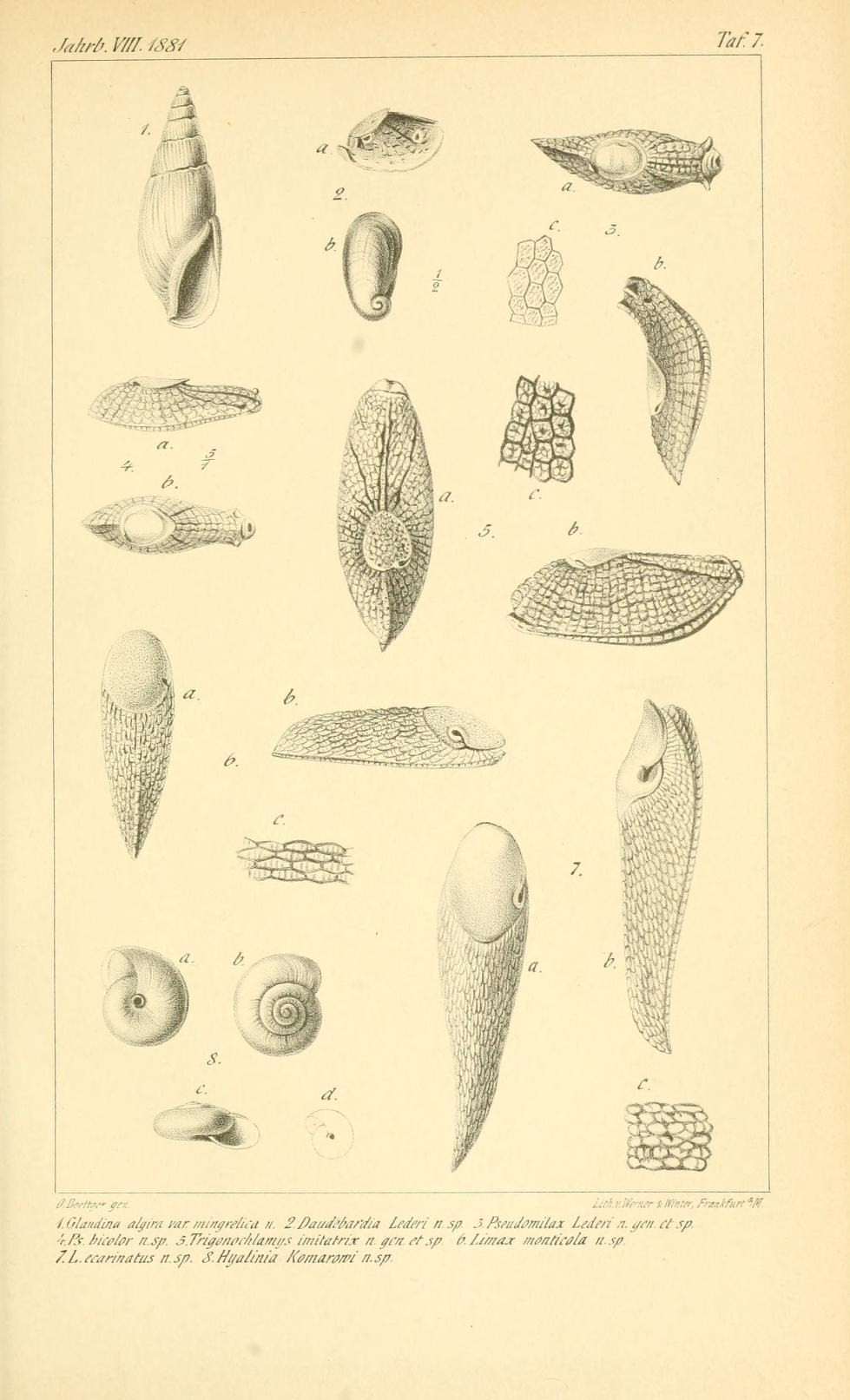
Plate accompanying the description of Limax ecarinatus

This species' original range is thought to be the Caucasus region and the Black Sea coast, so it may be native where it occurs in: Romania, Bulgaria, Ukraine, Turkey, southwestern Russia, Armenia, Azerbaijan, and Georgia. It is considered an introduction in:

- Great Britain; dramatic increase in 21st century, replacing L. flavus
- Island of Ireland; earlier replacement of L. flavus than in Britain
- Greece (uncertain identification)
- Canary Islands
- Germany
- Netherlands
- Czech Republic
- Hungary
- Belarus
- Kyiv in Ukraine
- Saint Petersburg and Astrakhan in Russia

Mitochondrial DNA sequences of new colonies in Hungary and the Czech Republic are identical to a haplotype common in the British Isles, which was colonised in the 19th century, suggesting that that may have been the intermediate source. A sequence from Germany is also very similar to this, whereas Ukrainian and Georgian sequences differed much more.

In its native range it is a forest species. Elsewhere it is found in synanthropic habitats like L. flavus, but much more commonly than that species in woodland and farmland, particularly under logs.
