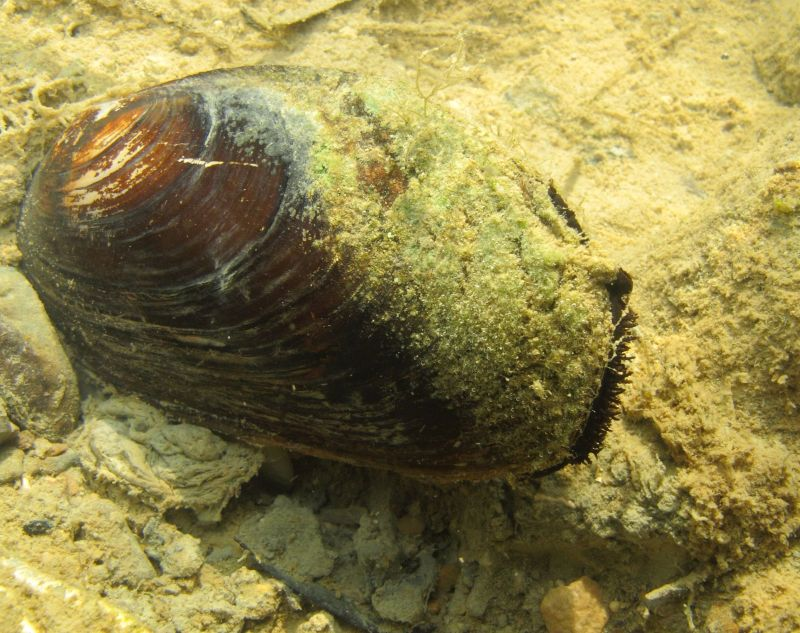

Conservation status
- Critically Endangered (IUCN 3.1)

Scientific classification
- Kingdom: Animalia
- Phylum: Mollusca
- Class: Bivalvia
- Order: Unionida
- Family: Unionidae
- Genus: Microcondylaea
- Species: M. bonellii

Binomial name
- Microcondylaea bonellii (Férussac, 1827)

= Microcondylaea bonellii =

Species of bivalve

Microcondylaea bonellii is a species of bivalve belonging to the family Unionidae. The species is endemic to South Europe.

Microcondylaea bonellii is a freshwater bivalve occurring in both rivers and lakes. It was known from Switzerland, Italy, Slovenia, Croatia, Montenegro, Lake Ohrid in Albania/North Macedonia, and Greece. However, it is extinct in Switzerland and Greece and possibly extinct in Lake Ohrid. Small populations remain in northern Italy, Slovenia, Montenegro, Albania and Croatia.
