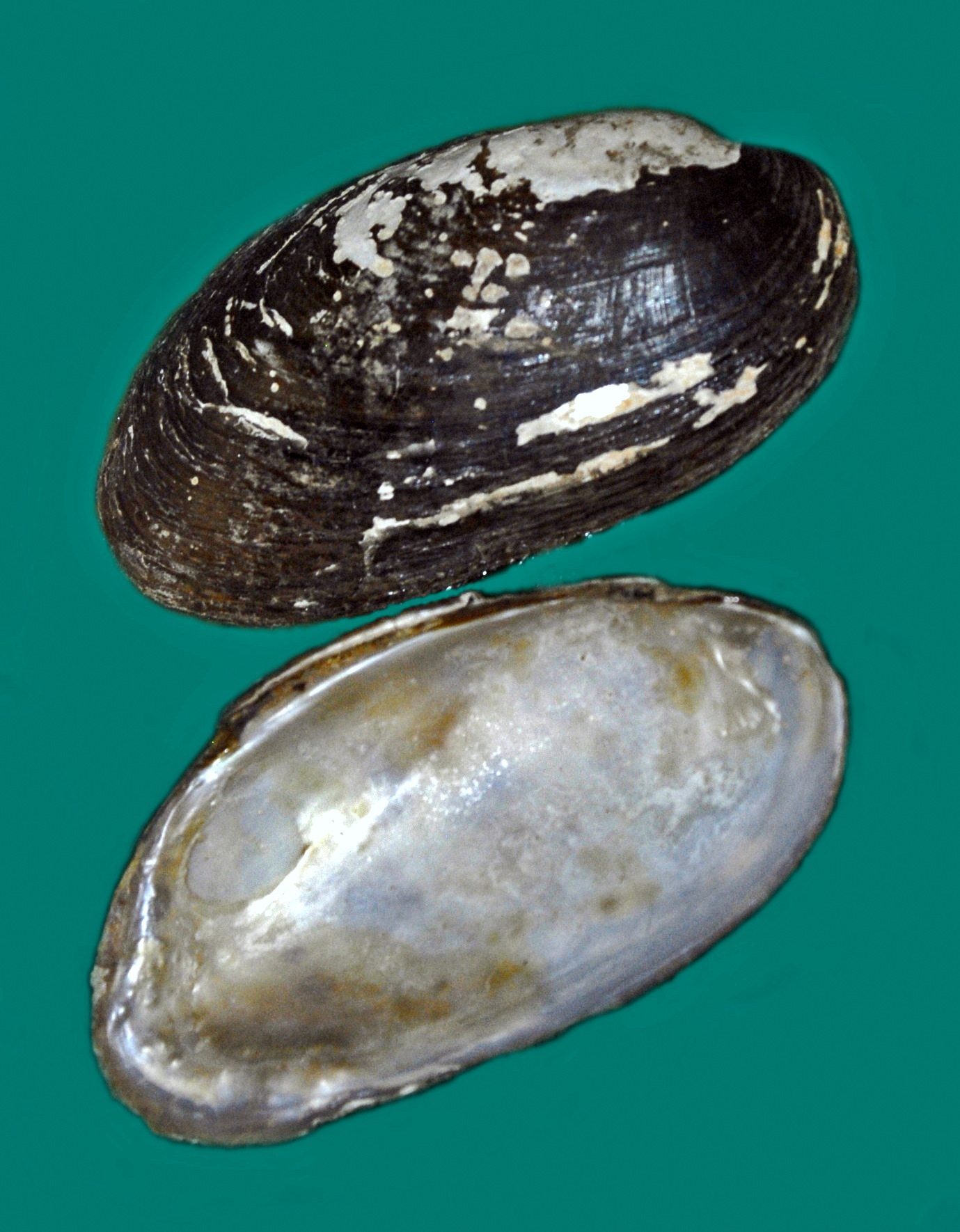
- A view of valves of Microcondylaea compressa

Conservation status
- Vulnerable (IUCN 3.1)

Scientific classification
- Domain: Eukaryota
- Kingdom: Animalia
- Phylum: Mollusca
- Class: Bivalvia
- Order: Unionida
- Family: Unionidae
- Genus: Microcondylaea
- Species: M. compressa

Binomial name
- Microcondylaea compressa (Menke, 1830)

Synonyms
- Microcondylaea bonellii (Menke, 1828); Margaritana bonellii

= Microcondylaea compressa =

Species of bivalve

Microcondylaea compressa is a species of freshwater mussel in the family Unionidae, the river mussels.

== Distribution ==
This species is present in southern Europe (Albania, Croatia, Italy, Macedonia and Slovenia).

== Habitat ==
This species prefers weakly flowing waters, lakes and stagnant waters with fine sandy substrate with some amount of clay. It does not tolerate large excursions of the environmental parameters.

== Description ==
Microcondylaea compressa can reach a length of about 99 millimetres (3.9 in) and a width of 45 millimetres (1.8 in). Shells are quite elongated and laterally compressed. The external surface is light brown to brown with living mussels (empty shells are often coloured dark brown to black) and shows shallow concentric striae of growth. Typical for this species are the tree-like ("arboriform") siphonal papillae - all other European freshwater mussels have undivided papillae. This allows identification of the species without disturbing by touching it even when dug in completely.

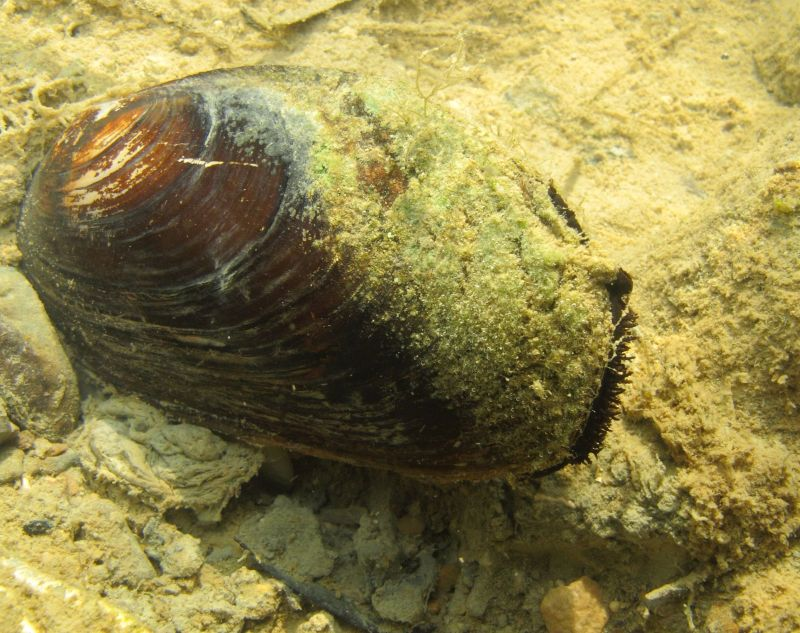
Microcondylaea compressa in Croatia. The tree-like ("arboriform") siphonal papillae are typical for this species.

== Biology ==
These mussels live completely sunken in sandy or muddy sediment. They mainly feed on phytoplankton and small particles suspended in the water and filtered by the gills. Their life lasts about 5–6 years. The glochidia are - similar to many North American freshwater mussels - released in whitish elongated conglutinates which probably mimic larvae of insects (Trichoptera) and attract possible host fish by this mimicry. There are no confirmed data on host fish species.

== Conservation status ==
Microcondylaea compressa has lost many populations in the area during the last century. Main reasons are construction works and changed structures of rivers, dredging of drenches and rivers and chemical pollution. According to IUCN it is classified as "VU" - vulnerable, actual research that the species is critically endangered "CR". Conservation measures should therefore carried out in rivers with viable populations.
