= Abronia =

Abronia may refer to:

- Abronia (gens), a Roman family of the Augustan age
- Abronia (lizard), a genus of animals commonly known as arboreal alligator lizards
- Abronia (plant), a genus of plants commonly known as sand-verbenas
