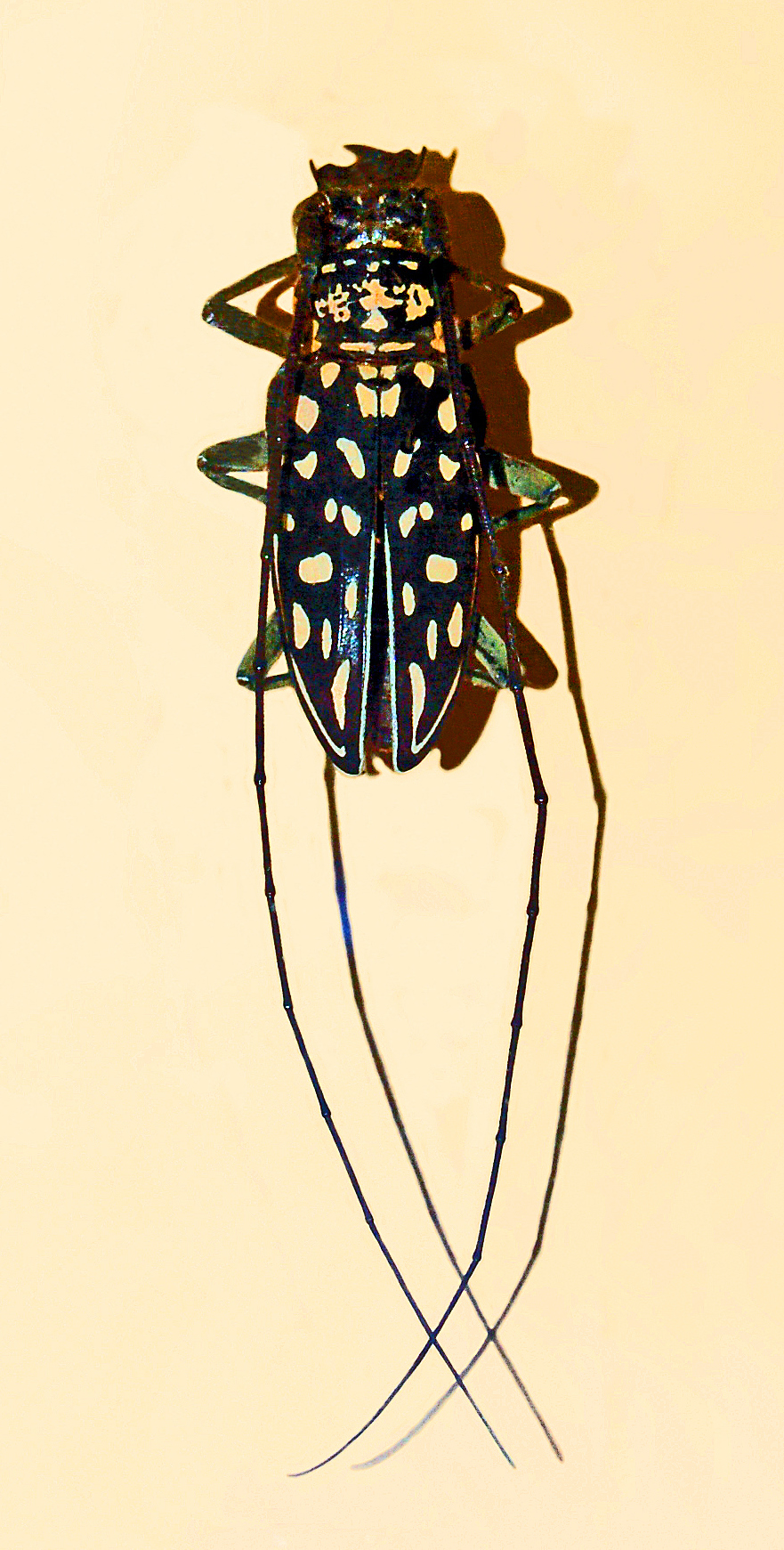
- Stellognatha maculata from Madagascar

Scientific classification
- Kingdom: Animalia
- Phylum: Arthropoda
- Class: Insecta
- Order: Coleoptera
- Suborder: Polyphaga
- Infraorder: Cucujiformia
- Family: Cerambycidae
- Tribe: Sternotomini
- Genus: Stellognatha; Laporte de Castenau, 1840

= Stellognatha =

Genus of beetles

Stellognatha is a genus of beetle belonging to the family Cerambycidae.

== Species ==
- Stellognatha maculata (Olivier, 1795)
