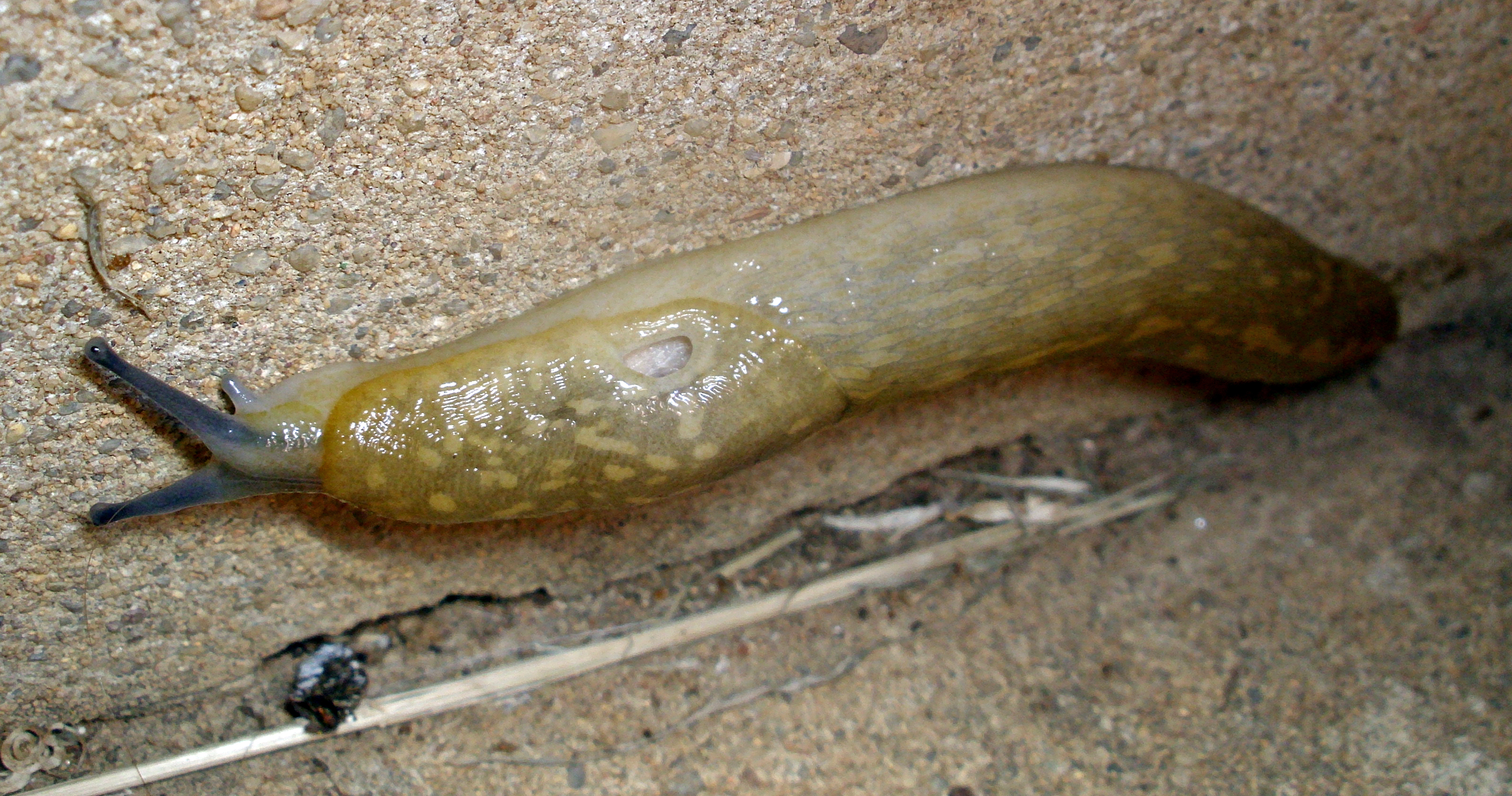
- Limacus flavus

Scientific classification
- Kingdom: Animalia
- Phylum: Mollusca
- Class: Gastropoda
- Order: Stylommatophora
- Family: Limacidae
- Genus: Limacus; Lehmann, 1864

Type species
- Limacus breckworthianus Lehmann, 1864

Synonyms
- Limax (Limacus) Lehmann, 1864; Plepticolimax Malm, 1868; Simrothia Clessin, 1884

= Limacus =

Genus of molluscs

Limacus is a genus of air-breathing land slugs, terrestrial pulmonate gastropod mollusc in the family Limacidae, the short-keeled slugs.

== Taxonomy ==
There remains a difference of opinion whether Limacus should be its own genus or a subgenus of Limax. A 2026 molecular phylogeny indicated that Limacus and Limax form sister clades (forming a polytomy together with Turcomilax), so both treatments are equally valid. Formerly, if Limacus was considered a subgenus of Limax, Limacus maculatus had to be known as Limax ecarinatus (because another species was formerly known under the name Limax maculatus), but a ruling by the ICZN has now made Limax maculatus correct.

== Species ==
Two extant species are known and one fossil.

- Limacus flavus (Linnaeus, 1758), the type species; synonyms = Limax flavus Linnaeus, 1758; Limacus breckworthianus Lehmann, 1864
- Limacus maculatus (Kaleniczenko, 1851); synonyms = Limax maculatus (Kaleniczenko, 1851), Limax ecarinatus Boettger, 1881; Limax grossui Lupu, 1970; Limax pseudoflavus Evans, 1978
- † Limacus crassitesta (Reuss, 1868)

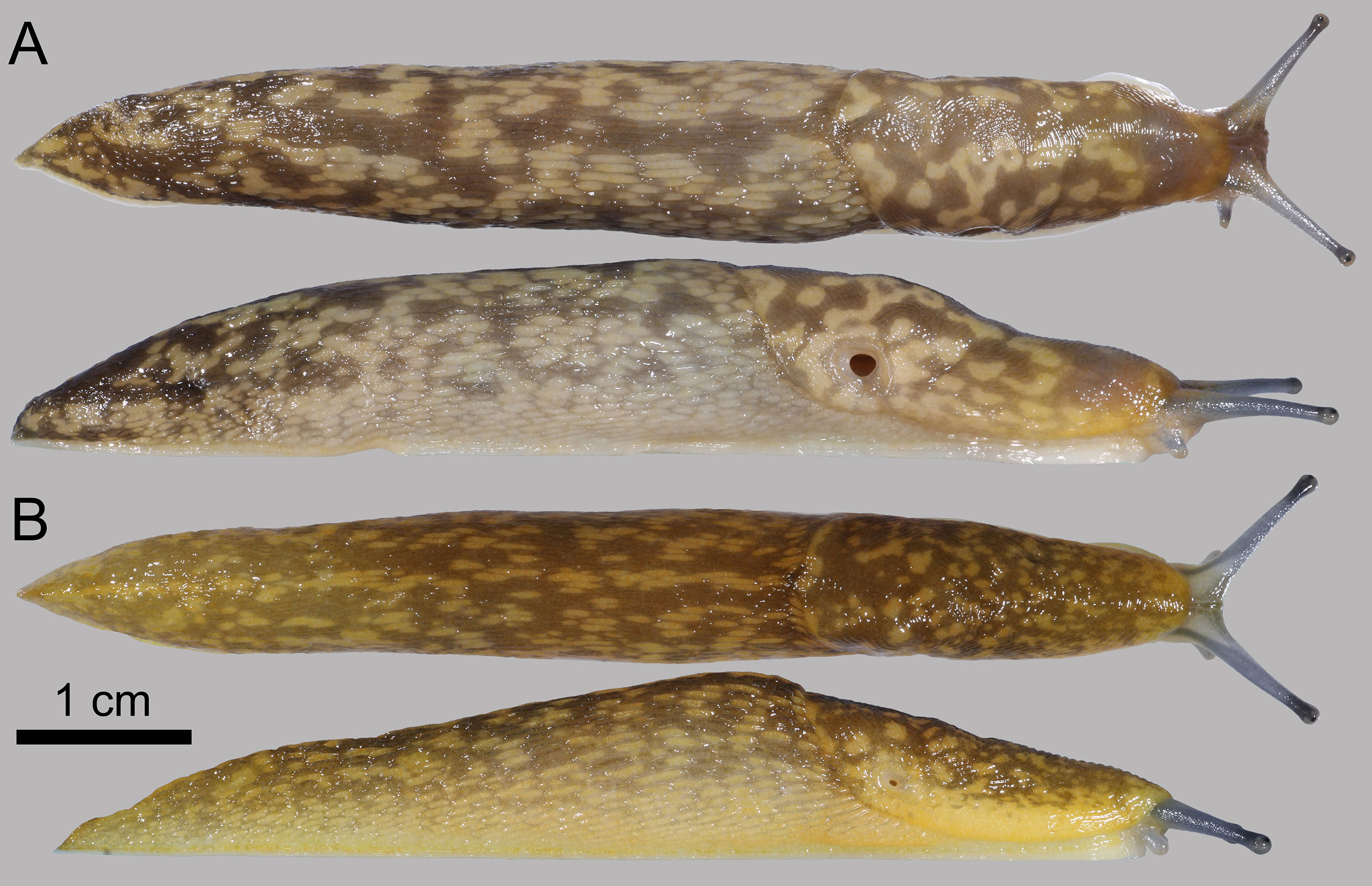
Limacus maculatus (A) and L. flavus (B)

The two extant species are hard or impossible to distinguish on external characters, so identification relies on a character of the genital anatomy, requiring dissection. They are large slugs up to 130 mm long, yellowish with mottled darker markings and blue-grey tentacles. Like other limacid slugs they have a pointed tail, and the pneumostome is in the hind part of the mantle. Genetic information suggests that the species may hybridise. Both species have spread from their native ranges in southern Europe and Asia, with L. flavus occurring worldwide as a synanthrope.
