= Marcus Porcius Latro =

1st century BC Roman rhetorician and a founder of scholastic rhetoric

Marcus Porcius Latro (died 4 BC) was a celebrated Roman rhetorician who is considered one of the founders of scholastic rhetoric.

He was born in Roman Spain, and is mentioned often in the works of his friend and contemporary Seneca the Elder, with whom he studied under Marillius.

In 17 BC, Latro declaimed before Augustus and Agrippa. His school was one of the most frequented at Rome, with the poets Ovid and Abronius Silo among its students. Latro is said to have possessed an astonishing memory, and displayed the greatest energy and vehemence, not only in declamation, but also in his studies and other pursuits. He is described as being invariably occupied in speaking, or preparing to speak, and he was considered by some to be the "manliest" of declaimers. He would study constantly and work himself to the point of exhaustion, after which he would restore himself with a holiday in Tuscany of hunting and farming, during which he never touched a book or pen. It was a peculiarity of Latro's that he would seldom, if ever, listen to his students declaim. They were there to listen and learn, to the declamations of Latro himself, or to his ironical comments on his rivals. His students therefore received the name of auditores ("listeners"), which word came gradually into use as synonymous with discipuli ("learners").

His declaiming style was against unreality, and he avoided the fantastical displays of ingenuity which tempted most speakers on unreal themes. He always tried to find some broad simple issue which would give sufficient field for eloquence instead of trying to raise as many questions as possible.

But great as was the reputation of Latro, he did not escape severe criticism on the part of his contemporaries: his language was censured by Messalla, and the arrangement of his orations by other rhetoricians. Though eminent as a rhetorician, he did not excel as a practical orator; and it is related of him that, when he had on one occasion in Spain to plead in the forum the cause of a relation, he felt so embarrassed by the novelty of speaking in the open air, that he could not proceed until he had induced the judges, through his friend the propraetor of Hither Spain, to remove from the forum into the basilica.

Latro died in 4 BC, as we learn from the Chronicon of Eusebius. Many modern writers suppose that Latro was the author of the Declamations of Sallust against Cicero, and of Cicero against Sallust.
