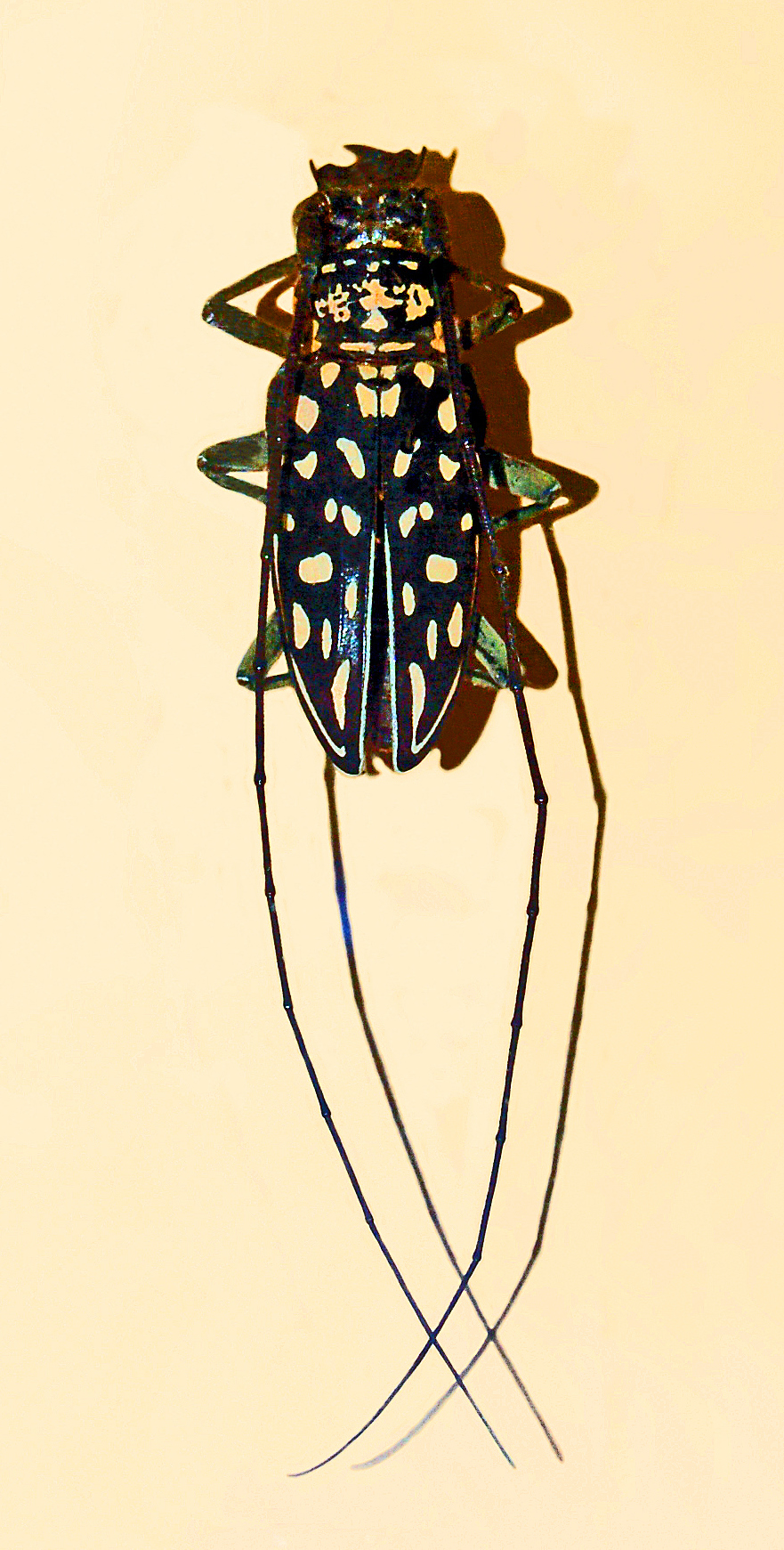
- Stellognatha maculata from Madagascar

Scientific classification
- Kingdom: Animalia
- Phylum: Arthropoda
- Clade: Pancrustacea
- Class: Insecta
- Order: Coleoptera
- Suborder: Polyphaga
- Infraorder: Cucujiformia
- Family: Cerambycidae
- Genus: Stellognatha
- Species: S. maculata

Binomial name
- Stellognatha maculata (Olivier, 1795)

Synonyms
- Cerambix [sic] maculatus Olivier, 1795; Lamia maculator Schönherr, 1817; Lamia cornutor Klug, 1833

= Stellognatha maculata =

Species of beetle

Stellognatha maculata is a species of beetle belonging to the family Cerambycidae.

== Description ==
Stellognatha maculata can reach a body length of 23–35 millimetres (0.91–1.38 in). The basic colour of these impressive long-horned beetles is blackish, with very long antennae and cream patches on the head, the prothorax and the elitra.

== Distribution ==
This species can be found in Madagascar.

== Sources ==
- Biolib
- Encyclopedia of Life
