= Bulimina =

Scientific classification
- Domain: Eukaryota
- Supergroup: Rhizaria
- Phylum: Foraminifera
- Class: Globothalamea
- Order: Rotaliida
- Family: Buliminidae
- Genus: Bulimina d'Orbigny, 1826

Genus of foraminifers

Bulimina is a genus of foraminifers belonging to the family Buliminidae.

The genus has cosmopolitan distribution.

== Species ==
Species:

- Bulimina abatissae Selli, 1946
- Bulimina acicula Costa, 1856
- Bulimina aculeata d'Orbigny, 1826
