= Abronius Silo =

Latin poet (fl. 1st century BC)

Abronius Silo (fl. 1st century BC) was a Latin poet who lived in the latter part of the Augustan age. Silo is mentioned in the suasoriae of Seneca the Elder. Seneca wrote that he was a pupil of the rhetorician Marcus Porcius Latro. According to Seneca, he plagiarized a poem about the Iliad from Latro. The plagiarized line read:

Danai, magnum paeana canentes, ite triumphantes: belli mora concidit Hector

Translated into English this quote reads:

Go forward, Greeks, singing a great paean, go victorious: Hector, the brake on the war, has fallen

Seneca also wrote that he fathered another poet, also named Silo, who wrote poetry intended for pantomimes; Seneca considered this to be a waste of his talents.
