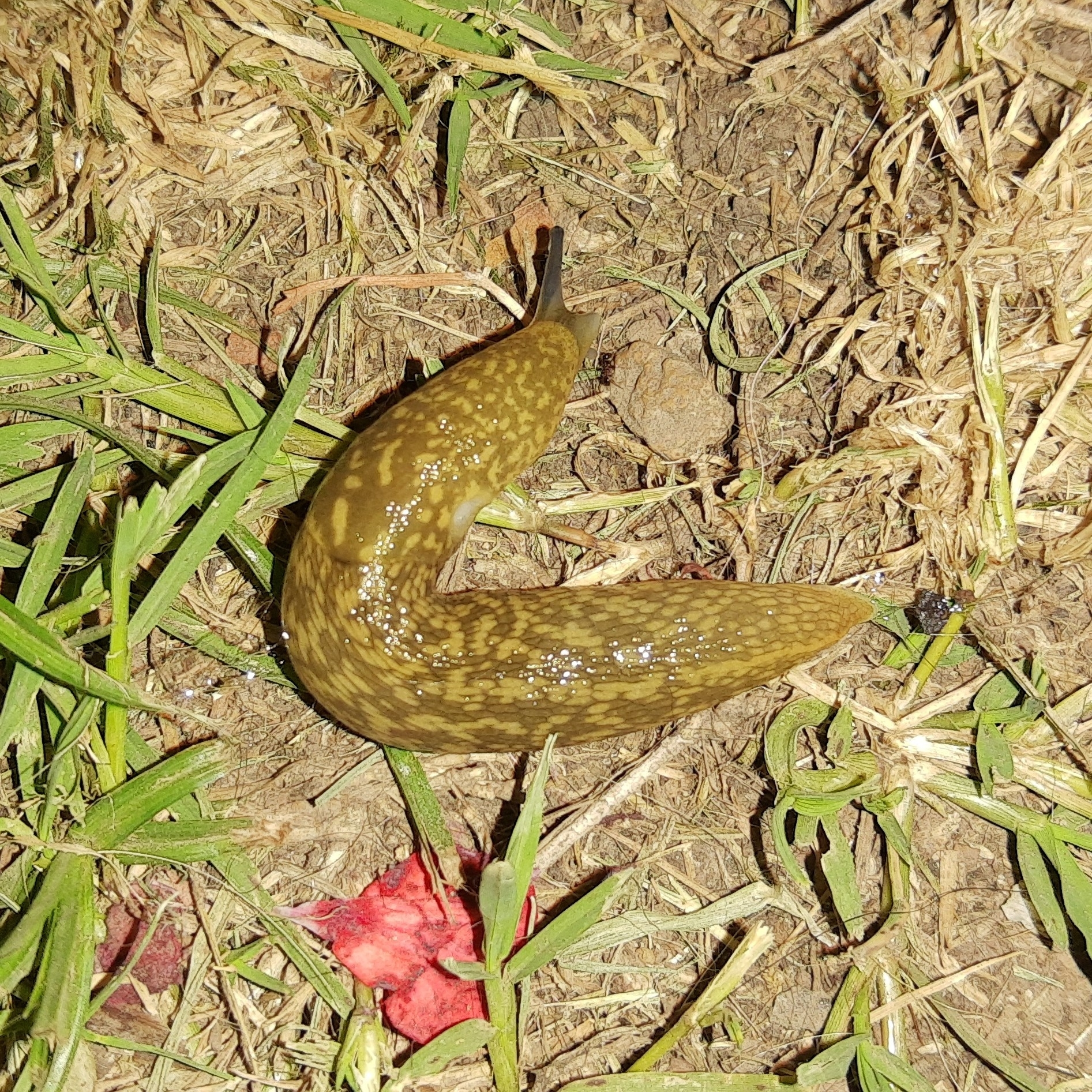

Conservation status
- Least Concern (IUCN 3.1)

- Secure (NatureServe)

Scientific classification
- Kingdom: Animalia
- Phylum: Mollusca
- Class: Gastropoda
- Order: Stylommatophora
- Family: Limacidae
- Genus: Limacus
- Species: L. flavus

Binomial name
- Limacus flavus (Linnaeus, 1758)

Synonyms
- Limax (Limacus) flavus Linnaeus, 1758 (alternative combination); Limax flavus Linnaeus, 1758 (original combination); Limacus breckworthianus Lehmann, 1864; and 12 other names

= Limacus flavus =

Species of gastropod

Limacus flavus, known commonly as the cellar slug, the yellow slug, or the tawny garden slug, is a large species of air-breathing land slug, a terrestrial pulmonate gastropod mollusc in the family Limacidae.

== Description and identification ==
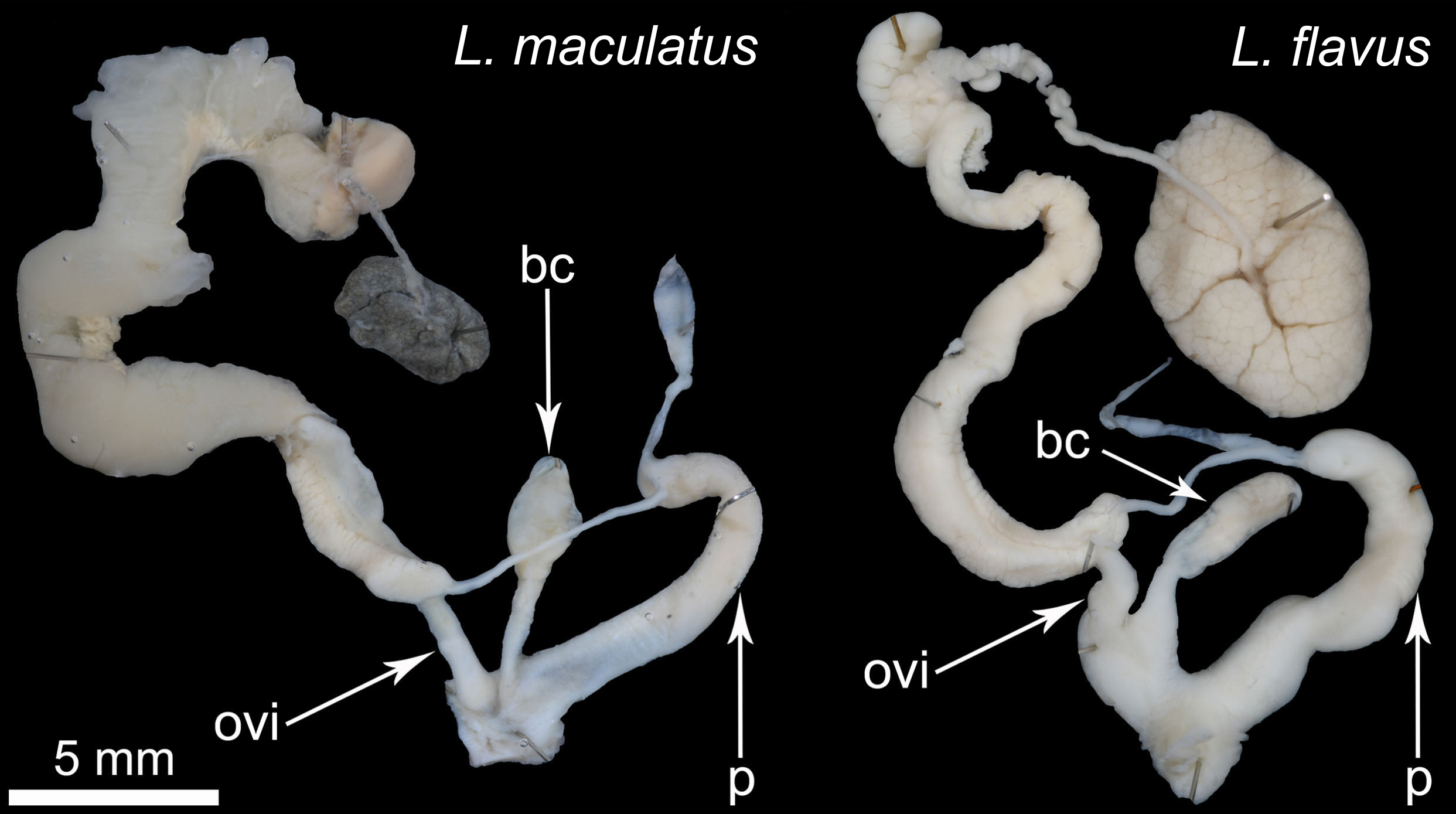
Genitalia of the two Limacus species; bc = bursa copulatrix, p = penis, ovi = free oviduct

Limacus flavus and L. maculatus are both large species of slug (up to 130 mm) with a yellow colouration, mottled with darker blotches; the tentacles are blue-grey. Juveniles are much darker. Like other limacid slugs, the tail is pointed and the pneumostome lies in the hind part of the mantle. The mucus is yellow or colourless.

The most reliable character to distinguish L. flavus from L. maculatus is where the duct of the bursa copulatrix attaches. It attaches to the base of the penis or to the atrium in L. maculatus, but some distance along the free oviduct in L. flavus.

External characters proposed to distinguish the species appear to be less consistent but may be useful in particular regions or as a preliminary indication. For instance in the British Isles L. flavus differs from L. maculatus in having a pale line along the midline of the back, but this is not consistenly present in Ukrainian populations. Claims that the dark pigment extends further ventrally down the flanks in L. maculatus are contradicted by British and Dutch specimens.

In the British Isles, apparently hybridisation has given rise to individuals with the genital characters of L. flavus but the mitochondrial DNA sequences of L. maculatus.

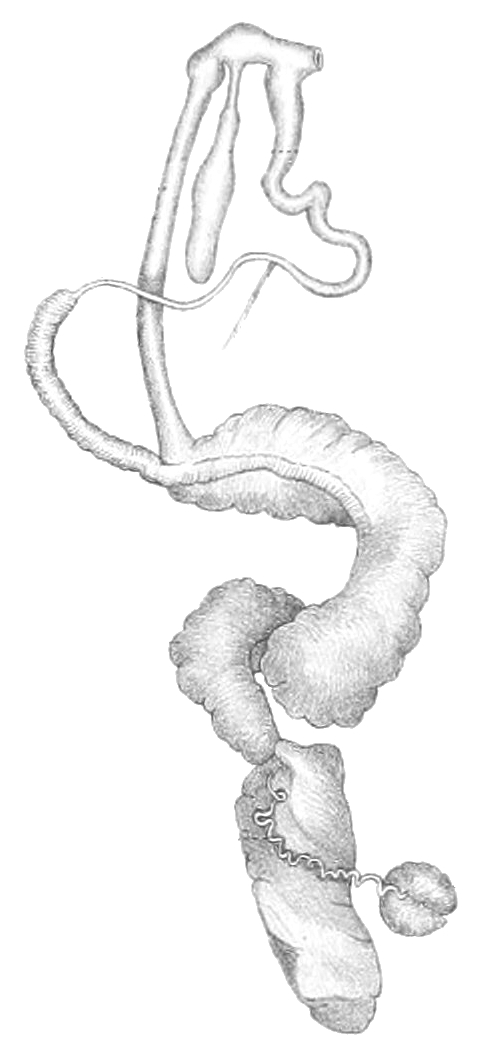
Drawing of reproductive system of Limacus flavus.

== Distribution ==
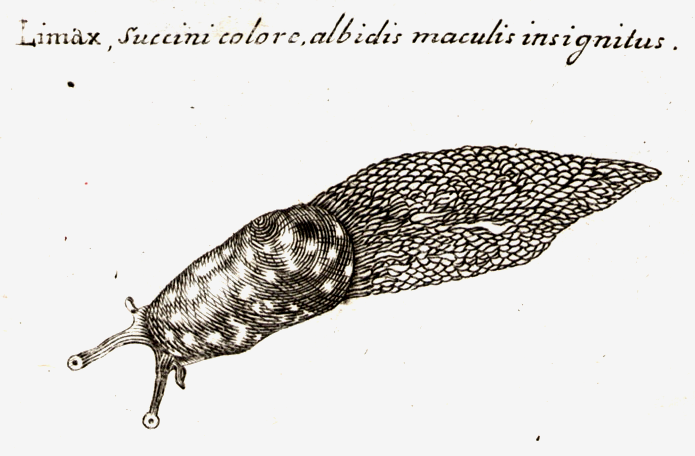

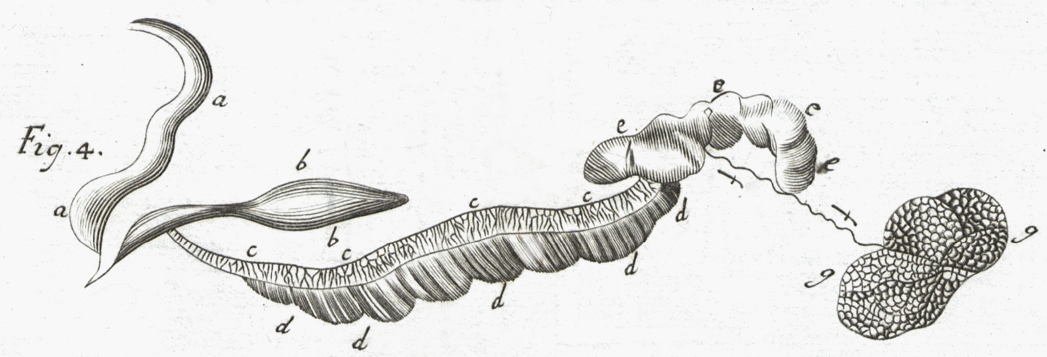
Illustrations from Martin Lister's 1694 book; the lower image of the genitalia identifies the slug as L. flavus, demonstrating its presence in Britain at that time.

Limacus flavus is most likely to be native in some area around the Mediterranean but has evidently been spread by man much more widely, so a genetic analysis would be necessary to be more certain of its origin. It has long occurred throughout most of Europe (certainly in Britain in the 17th century), but in central and northern parts it is usually associated with cellars and drains. Elsewhere it has been recorded from Iraq, North Africa, Macaronesia, North America, Brazil, Chile, Uraguay, Bermuda, St Helena, South Africa, Madagascar, Réunion, China, Japan, Australia, New Zealand, Hawaii and other Pacific islands.

In Ukraine it is expanding its range in the 21st century, possibly associated with global warming. In Central Europe, the cleaning up and sealing of old cellars has led to it being considered threatened, but night searching has suggested that it remains more widespread than at one time feared. In Ireland and Great Britain it appears to be being displaced by its congener L. maculatus.

== Behaviour ==
Yellow slugs, like the majority of other land slugs, use two pairs of tentacles on their heads to sense their environment. The upper pair, called optical tentacles, is used to sense light. The lower pair, oral tentacles, provide the slug's sense of smell. Both pairs can retract and extend themselves to avoid hazards, and, if lost to an accident or predation, can be regrown.

Like all slugs, the yellow slug moves relatively slowly, gliding along using a series of muscular contractions on the underside of its foot, which is lubricated with mucus, such that it leaves a slime trail behind it.

== Ecology ==
This species feeds mostly on fungi, decaying matter, and vegetables.

=== Habitat ===
This species is strongly associated with human habitation, and is usually found in damp areas such as cellars, kitchens, and gardens or under stones. Generally speaking it is only seen at night, because it is nocturnal. Thus often it goes unnoticed and people are unaware of how (relatively) common the species is.

=== Parasites ===
Parasites of Limacus flavus include the nematode Angiostoma spiridonovi and the slug mite Riccardoella oudemansi.
