= Clariaidae =

Scientific classification
- Domain: Eukaryota
- Kingdom: Animalia
- Phylum: Rotifera
- Class: Monogononta
- Order: Ploima
- Family: Clariaidae

Family of rotifers

Clariaidae is a family of rotifers belonging to the order Ploima.

One genus with one species:

- Claria Kutikova, Markevich & Spiridonov, 1990
  - Claria segmentata Kutikova, Markevich & Spiridonov, 1990
