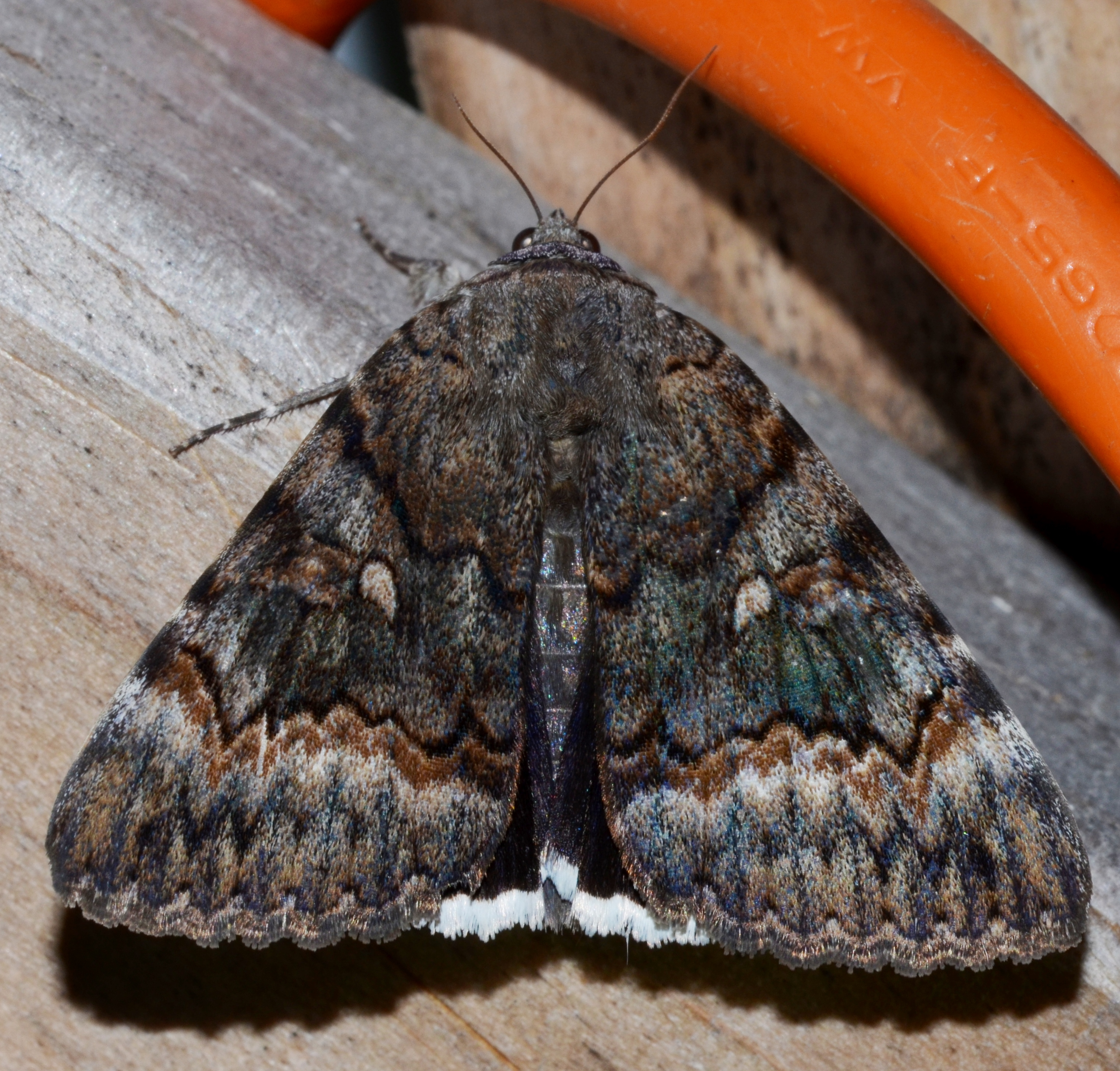

Scientific classification
- Kingdom: Animalia
- Phylum: Arthropoda
- Class: Insecta
- Order: Lepidoptera
- Superfamily: Noctuoidea
- Family: Erebidae
- Genus: Catocala
- Species: C. epione

Binomial name
- Catocala epione (Drury, 1773)

Synonyms
- Phalaena epione Drury, 1773; Noctua marginata Fabricius, 1775; Noctua marginella Fabricius, 1794; Catocala marginata

= Catocala epione =

Species of moth

Catocala epione, the Epione underwing, is a moth of the family Erebidae. The species was first described by Dru Drury in 1773. It is found in North America from Quebec and Ontario south through Connecticut to Florida and west to Texas and Oklahoma.

The wingspan is 55–65 mm. Adults are on wing from August to September. There is probably one generation per year.

The larvae feed on Carya ovata.
