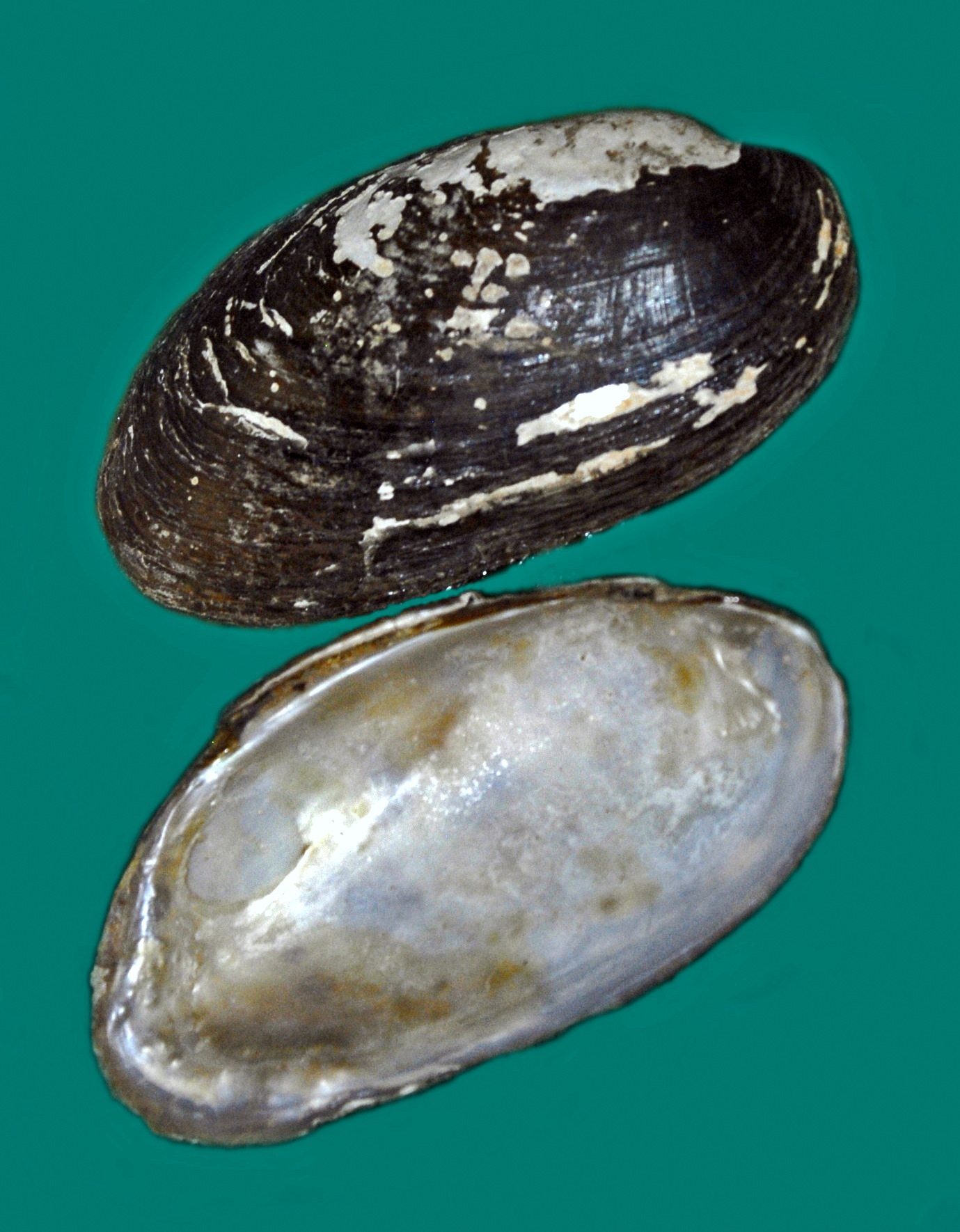
- Microcondylaea compressa

Scientific classification
- Domain: Eukaryota
- Kingdom: Animalia
- Phylum: Mollusca
- Class: Bivalvia
- Order: Unionida
- Family: Unionidae
- Genus: Microcondylaea; Vest, 1866

= Microcondylaea =

Genus of bivalves

Microcondylaea is a genus of freshwater mussels in the family Unionidae, the river mussels.

== Species ==
- Microcondylaea compressa (Menke, 1828)
