= International Society of Zoological Sciences =

ISZS
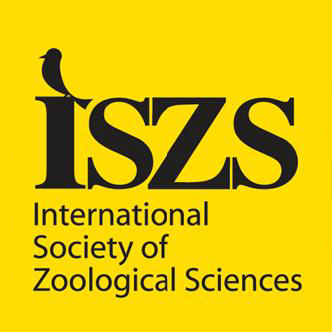
- Founded: 2004; Beijing, China
- Type: Nonprofit organization
- Purpose: Zoology, science
- Location: Beijing, China (international)
- Region served: Worldwide
- Method: Communication, research, coordination
- Key people: Nils Chr. Stenseth, President; Sarita Maree, Vice President; Zhibin Zhang, Executive Member; Chunxu Han, ISZS Secretariat
- Website: www.globalzoology.org.cn

The International Society of Zoological Sciences (ISZS) was founded to encourage research, education, and communication in zoology. The society includes both individual scholars, and professional organizations. It particularly tries to increase the availability of research resources and enhance cooperation between different branches of zoology.

== History ==
To summarize from Francis Dov Por's "The Road to the International Society of Zoological Sciences" "Zoology ... was among the very first disciplines to build an international organization. Congresses of Zoology started in 1889 on the initiative of the Société zoologique de France on the occasion of the International Exposition in Paris. Congresses were then held at regular intervals and attendance increased from congress to congress, from a few tens in Paris and in Moscow to 700 in Budapest in 1927. The London Congress set a target of 1000 and in Washington the number reached 2500.

The Congresses were also growing in complexity, resulting in part because of the emerging specialization of different fields of zoology. In London in 1958 there were eight to nine daily parallel sessions. In Washington an attempt was made to organize symposia instead and there were no less than 29: the problem of unifying subjects became more important than the numbers of participants.

The Washington Congress decided that the Board of the Division of Zoology of the newly founded IUBS, would assume in the future the role of the 'Comite Permanent' and would be responsible for ensuring the continuity of Zoological Congresses. This did not work and the new International Congresses of Systematic and Evolutionary Biology (ICSEB) took over the role of the Zoological Congresses.

A gallant effort was made in 1972 by Vaissiere and French colleagues to convene a XVII International Congress of Zoology in Monte Carlo. However, attendance was poor and the proceedings were never published. A long hiatus then began. An international focus became the problem of vanishing species. Instead, what followed in the next two decades was the vanishing of zoology from the international academic agenda. The names of university departments and research centers were rapidly changed in order to avoid use of the word 'zoology'.

With the aid of modern communications and technology a reunification of the fractured specialties of zoology became possible. The concept of an integrative zoology, synthesizing data and results ranging from molecular biology to behavior, gained wide acceptance. The XVIII International Congress of Zoology was held in Athens in Greece in August 2000. The symposium program of the Congress presented a cross-zoological picture of the many levels of zoological inquiry, both horizontal and vertical. Attendance in Athens was far from the incommunicable thousands in the last congresses, but was considered by all as an unmitigated success.

Subsequently, the IUBS approved the (re)formation of an international zoological body (the ISZS) as proposed by Zhibin Zhang, John Buckeridge and Francis Dov Por in Beijing in 2004, and an executive committee was elected and charged with organizing International Congresses of Zoology and providing a global voice for zoologists."

== Structure ==
As if at the end of 2013, the ISZS has 1032 individual members and 113 institutional members, having a coverage of over 30,000 zoologists, scientists and research workers all over the world. The Institutional Members include national zoological organizations, universities, non-governmental organizations and academies of science.

ISZS is managed by an international Executive Committee. The current President is Zhibin Zhang (China). Immediate Past Presidents include: Jean-Marc Jallon (France), John Buckeridge (Australia) and Dov Por (Israel).

The Secretariat of the ISZS is located at C-506, Institute of Zoology, Chinese Academy of Sciences, 1 Beichen West Road, Chaoyang District, Beijing 100101, China. The current Secretary General is Chunxu Han (China).

== Activities ==
=== International Congresses of Zoology ===
Meetings of the International Congress of Zoology have been held every four years, but with gaps and irregularities.

- 1889 Paris (I)
- 1892 Moscow (II)
- 1895 Leyden (III)
- 1898 Cambridge, UK (IV)
- 1901 Berlin (V)
- 1904 Berne (VI)
- 1907 Boston (VII)
- 1910 Graz (VIII)
- 1913 Monaco (IX)
- 1927 Budapest (X)
- 1930 Padova (XI)
- 1935 Lisbon (XII)
- 1948 Paris (XIII)
- 1953 Copenhagen (XIV)
- 1958 London (XV)
- 1963 Washington (XVI)
- 1972 Monte Carlo (XVII)
- 2000 Athens, Greece (XVIII)
- 2004 Beijing, China (XIX)
- 2008 Paris, France (XX)
- 2012 Haifa, Israel (XXI)
- 2016 Japan (XXII)

=== International Symposia of Integrative Zoology ===
International Symposia of Integrative Zoology are held between Congresses, and provide a more intimate avenue for zoological exchange and research networking. They commenced in 2006 and are heavily supported by the Chinese Academy of Sciences.

- 2006 1st International Symposium of Integrative Zoology
- 2007 2nd International Symposium of Integrative Zoology
- 2009 3rd International Symposium of Integrative Zoology: Biological Consequences of Global Change and Darwin 200 Events
- 2010 4th International Symposium of Integrative Zoology: Data Collection and Sharing
- 2013 5th International Synposium of Integrative Zoology: Biological Consequences of Global Change (BCGC)

=== Integrative Zoology ===

Integrative Zoology is the official journal of the ISZS and published jointly by John Wiley & Sons and the Institute of Zoology, Chinese Academy of Sciences. It is a quarterly, peer-reviewed and multidisciplinary journal publishing original research, reviews, essays and opinion pieces on the zoological sciences. The Editor-in-Chief is Zhibin Zhang of the Chinese Academy of Sciences and the Honorary Editor-in-Chief is John Buckeridge of RMIT University.

== Research programs ==
The ISZS coordinates and funds a number of multidisciplinary programs. Currently, the society is undertaking an international research program titled 'Biological Consequences of Global Change (BCGC)'.

Focus

The focus of the BCGC program is to organize a diverse group of international experts, with expertise in many scientific disciplines, and develop an understanding of the consequences of global change and human activity on evolutionary mechanisms, biological structures, endangered species and biological disasters.

The BCGC program provides a platform for scientists around the world to collaborate on topics, such as the impact of global change on biodiversity, ecological infectious diseases, agricultural pests, invasive species and many other topics of interest. The program is expanding its research networks to include more scientists and scientific disciplines from various places around the globe.

Goals

Promote understanding of BCGC and improve management of the earth Promote international collaboration Promote influence and leadership of IUBS and ISZS through the BCGC program

Questions to address

Impact of global change on biological disasters like disease and pest outbreaks Impact of global change and its relation to alien species invasion Impact of global change on abundance and range shifts of endangered species Impact of global change on community structure and biodiversity of various ecosystems Nonlinearity and interactions of global change in affecting biological populations

Action plan for 2013–2015

Program network expansion

- Attract more scientists and partners
- Promote program influence and increase research capabilities

Website and database construction

- Build an open access database
- Promote data sharing among scientists

International symposia or workshops

- Organize 2 international symposia or workshops
- Discuss range shifts of species under global warming
- Examine biodiversity change due to human disturbance

Publications

- Publish 2 special issues of BCGC in Integrative Zoology

International training courses

- Organize 2 international training classes under the theme of BCGC

Get involved

To find out more information about how to get your research team involved Visit http://www.globalzoology.org.cn/ Or email iszs2@ioz.ac.cn
