= Esclusas y molino de Casablanca =

Hydraulic complex on Zaragoza, Spain

Coordinates: 41.6285°N 0.9089°W

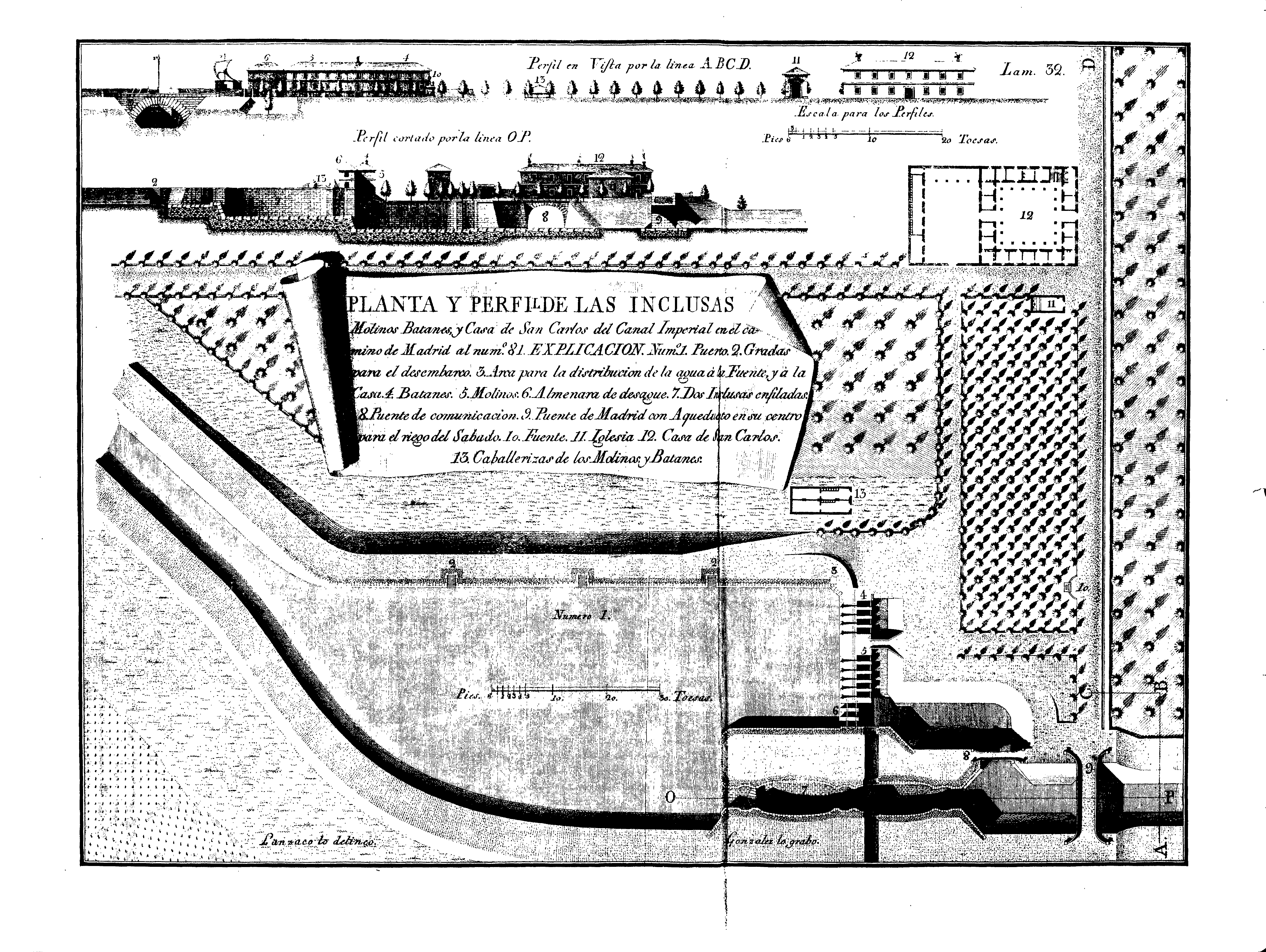
Plan and profile of the locks in the Descripción de los Canales imperial de Aragón i Real de Tauste by the Count of Sástago (Mateo González, 1796).

The Esclusas y molino de Casablanca (English: Locks and mill at Casablanca) or Puerto de Casablanca (Port of Casablanca), also known as Almenara, Esclusas, Casa or San Carlos Mill, is a hydraulic complex located along the Imperial Canal of Aragon in Zaragoza (Spain).

It was inaugurated as part of the Imperial Canal of Aragon works in 1786 and formed an integral part of Zaragoza life from the 18th century. It was a site of great significance during the Enlightenment in Aragon, in the sieges of Zaragoza during the Peninsular War, and in the industrialization and electrification of the 20th century in the region. As such, it formed the historic nucleus of the current Casablanca neighborhood and district, to which it gave its current name due to its characteristic white walls.

Today, it serves as a small hydroelectric power station and as a historic complex around which a park known for the Fountain of the Incredulous is organized. Since 2000 it has been protected as a Bien de Interés Cultural (Asset of Cultural Interest).

== Description ==
The complex is located at kilometer 81.5 of the Imperial Canal of Aragon. The locks span two drops of 3.25 meters each, built in limestone. Formerly they were closed with wooden gates, now disappeared after losing their use when navigation on the canal ceased. The chambers they form are elliptical in plan (with 9.75 and 35.10 meters on their axes) and took eight minutes to fill during their operational period. This is a typical typology of the era, designed to contain the thrust of water against the terrain using a vault structure.

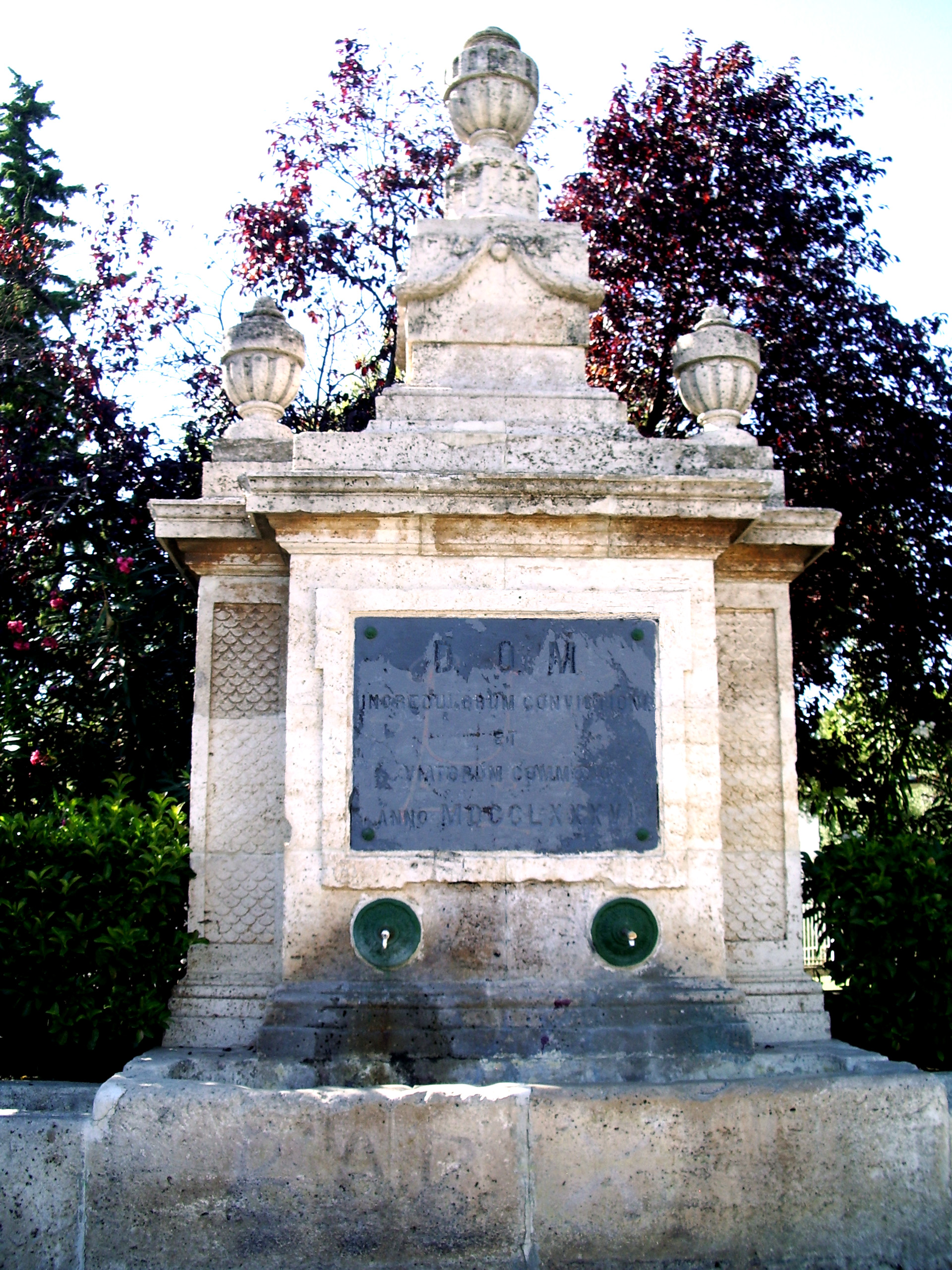
The Fountain of the Incredulous.

Parallel to the locks, the current encounters three arched linteled gates that divert the current for human use. Above these is located the so-called almenara of San Carlos, following the typical scheme in the canal's architecture. It consists of a one-story hut, to operate the almenaras, and an attached two-story module, used as quarters for the guard. Both blocks are plastered with lime, giving it the white color that earned the building the popular name of "la Casablanca" (the White House).

The mill attached to this building has two floors and is an example of the industrial architecture of the era. It has a rectangular plan with ashlar stone walls also whitewashed, finished with eaves and covered by a four-slope roof of Arabic tile. The tailraces of the old mill are still preserved, which had six millstones in operation.

In the vicinity of the mill were two more blocks of rectangular plan and similar appearance. One, located to the west, was used for fulling mills and today is the office of ACESA (Ebro Hydrographic Confederation). In front of it, a dike was built for operation as a port, which allowed ships of 126x25 toises, capable of transporting 2700 arrobas. The other building, located to the northeast and now disappeared, was known as Casa de San Carlos and was a port warehouse and later an inn for travelers. To provide these services, it had stables nearby.

The complex was surrounded by an open area, where the Fountain of the Incredulous and the current Incredulous Park are located. A bridge on the Royal Road crossed nearby on its route from Valencia (Note: The first royal road from Zaragoza connected Barcelona with Madrid. In the vicinity of Zaragoza there were two alternative routes, both considered part of the itinerary: one through Calatayud, which crossed the canal in the La Muela area, and another through Daroca which was the one that passed near the mill. Over time and with the development of the road network, the Casablanca route ended up reaching Teruel and Valencia. Although in old sources the denomination "Madrid Road" appears for this bridge, the more modern nomenclature of "Valencia Road" for the route avoids confusion with the bridge on the La Muela road.) to the city. The aqueduct that went to Romareda passed over the bridge, with tolls collected for its maintenance. The bridge was later widened for motor traffic at the expense of Casa de San Carlos, with the structure of the original bridge still visible under the new concrete deck. In times past there also existed a small chapel in the area, under the invocation of the Virgin of the Pillar.

== History ==
=== Construction ===
The connection of the Cantabrian Sea with the Mediterranean was a strategic Aragonese dream in Enlightenment times. The Royal Aragonese Economic Society of Friends of the Country and, particularly, Ramón Pignatelli promoted from 1776 the construction of the Imperial Canal of Aragon to create a navigable waterway that would allow Aragonese products to reach the sea and develop irrigated agriculture.

Its passage through Zaragoza was complex due to the orography, making the creation of several sets of locks and unique works to cross the Huerva River inevitable. The original project, by Dutch engineer Cornelis Krayenhoff, was corrected and executed by military engineer Julián Sánchez Boort and his team (which included Fernando de Ulloa and Luis Chimioni). Next to the locks closest to the city, and taking advantage of the fact that they should be stopping places for vessels, it was decided to erect a complex with docks and warehouses for ships using the canal. In addition, the unevenness of the so-called almenara of San Carlos allowed the current to be used to move a flour mill and several fulling mills as part of Zaragoza's first modern industry.

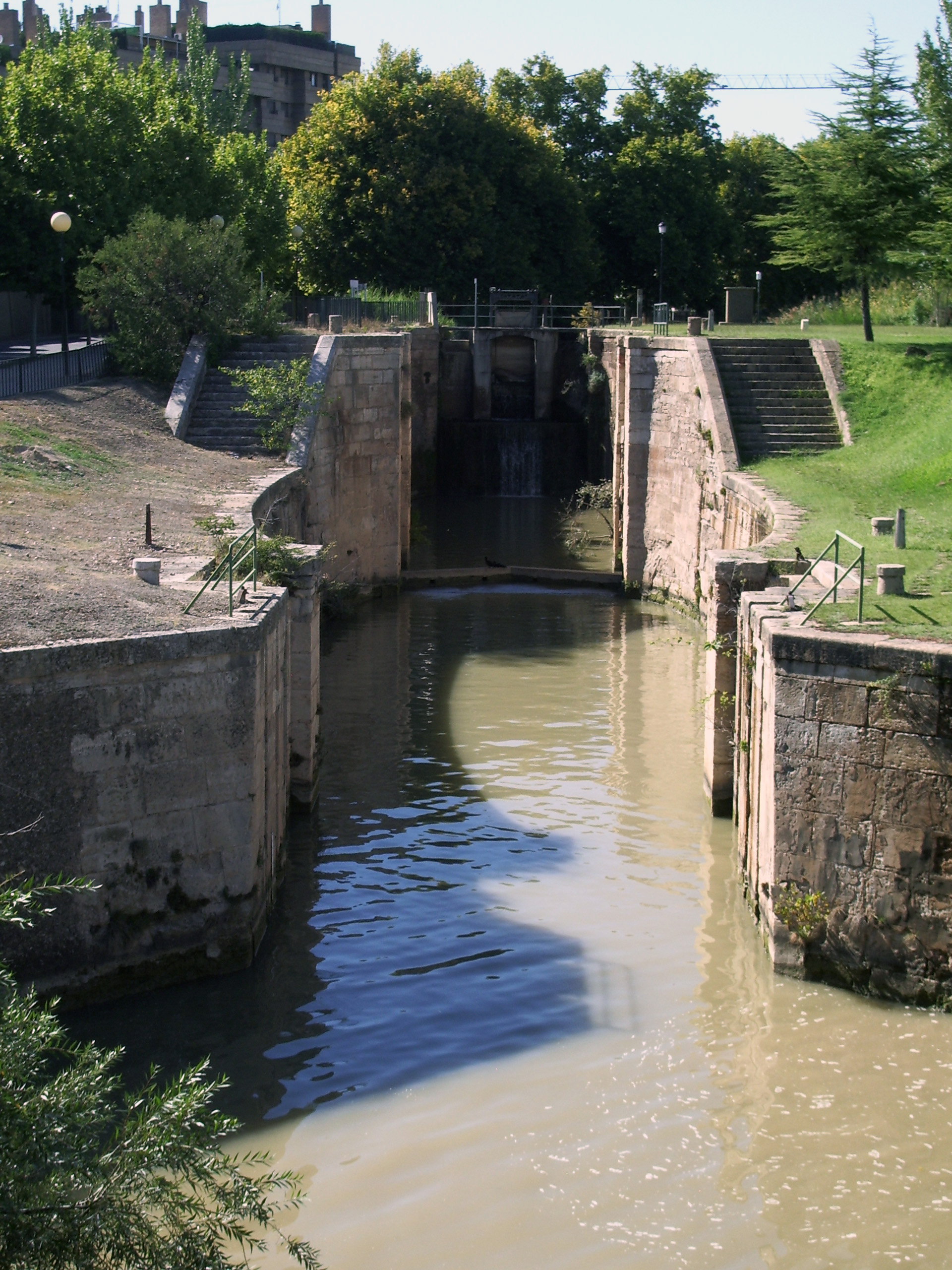
Old Casablanca locks.

The works were long and costly. After various financing problems by the canal's promoters, the locks' works began in 1780 and were completed in 1782, although the waters did not reach Casablanca until 1784. The opening of the following Zaragoza sections of the canal, complicated by the difficulties presented by the soil, was postponed two more years and it was not until 1786 that the complex could be officially inaugurated. The inauguration of Casablanca served as a public celebration for the conclusion of the canal works, in a massive event that attracted most of the population.

The facilities were a unique point as the main contact between the infrastructure and the largest city it served. Showing its symbolism, Pignatelli ordered the erection there of the Fountain of the Incredulous as a response to critics of the project. Symbols of the hydraulic enterprise undertaken, the locks became from the first moment one of Zaragoza's symbols. English traveler Joseph Townsend described them thus on his journey in 1786-1787:

When we crossed this canal near Zaragoza, on our way to Madrid, we stopped to examine the works; and I must confess that I have never seen anything so beautiful or so perfect of its kind as the locks and landing stages.

— Joseph Townsend, A Journey through Spain in the Years 1786 and 1787..., vol. I, p. 214

In 1789 Pignatelli gave the order for navigation to begin on the canal. In its first moments of life, the port had intense activity. About ten ships provided regular service transporting grain, salt and other products thanks to the force of the Cierzo or draft animals when the wind was not enough. The journey between El Bocal (Tudela) and the port of Casablanca, half a league from Zaragoza, took 12 to 16 hours, reducing to a quarter the time compared to a land convoy. The reverse route had to be done with animal traction against the wind and took twice as long.

The main goods transported were wheat, from the Navarrese riverbank and the rich agricultural area of the Cinco Villas to the Zaragoza market on the outbound journey and products from the Aragonese market garden (licorice, vegetables) along with small manufactures on the return. During the War of the Pyrenees (1793-1795), significant military traffic was also added given the advantages it offered for transporting artillery and ammunition. For passenger transport, two vessels "like those of Holland" with fourteen seated places under cover (plus others outside) were available, offering regular services to Tudela with stops at the port of Casablanca and Miraflores port.

=== Casablanca during the War of Independence ===
This logistics hub was especially relevant during the Peninsular War, with the canal being used as part of the main supply routes of the occupying French army. Their logistics routes entered the peninsula through Navarre, and upon reaching Tudela, they used the canal to supply their operations in Aragon and Catalonia.

The city's uprising against the French occupation in May 1808 forced the anti-French party to take the canal, where canal official Antonio Lamana distinguished himself by securing for the rebels the boats that plied it. As part of the rapid program of fortification of the city by Antonio de Sangenís, the canal was redesigned as a defensive line to cover the southern flank of the city, with several cannons installed at Casablanca and other key points. Casablanca was key to controlling the city's supply and its bridge was one of the possible crossings of the canal to surprise the defenders, so the garrison was significant. As Agustín Alcaide Ibieca cites in his history of the sieges:

To the Casa blanca went a portion of civilians with some volunteers under the orders of the Marquis of Lazán; they placed two cannons at the landing stage, and others at the America bridge; the sergeant major don Alonso Escobedo being in charge of defending it

— Situation of June 14, 1808. Agustín Alcaide Ibieca. (collected in Pérez Francés)

Meanwhile, the newly invested commander of the rebels José de Palafox summoned all available vessels at the Casablanca facilities to send troops to Tudela.

The rapid French advance made the sorties from the port of Casablanca fruitless. But despite the failure to relieve the Ebro riverbank upstream, Palafox managed through the ports of Casablanca and Miraflores to equip himself with weapons and ammunition before the arrival of the French army.

After the failure of Zaragoza's advanced defense, the French forces hastened to besiege the city. One of the key combats took place on June 15, 1808 at Casablanca, where despite the harsh initial reception given to them by the defenders, the defense line was broken when one of the cannons exploded, leaving the other damaged. Only the spirit of Escobedo, who soon understood the risk that the loss of the bridge giving access from the south posed for the city and set up a second defensive line inside, avoided greater evils for the defenders.

The resulting first siege however ended in a Gallic failure, as they failed to close the siege. Unable to surrender the city, they had to end up lifting the siege after news arrived of the defeat at Bailén. In their flight from the city, they abandoned significant quantities of weaponry at the port of Casablanca.

However, Napoleon's personal intervention changed the course of the war and the French army soon returned to attempt to capture the city. As a preventive measure, the canal was cut in October 1808 at Grisén, to prevent French artillery and heavy weaponry from approaching Casablanca. The defensive positions at Casablanca were reinforced with the formation of two artillery batteries and the felling of the surrounding olive trees that limited the firing zone. However, the position's commanders distrusted its security. The person responsible for Casablanca, Federico Castañer, requested in a report more men and ammunition while the artillery commander Luis de Gonzaga y de Villaba, later backed by Sangenís himself, alerted Palafox to the vulnerability of the position. Despite these voices, Palafox refused to divide his forces further to reinforce the garrison.

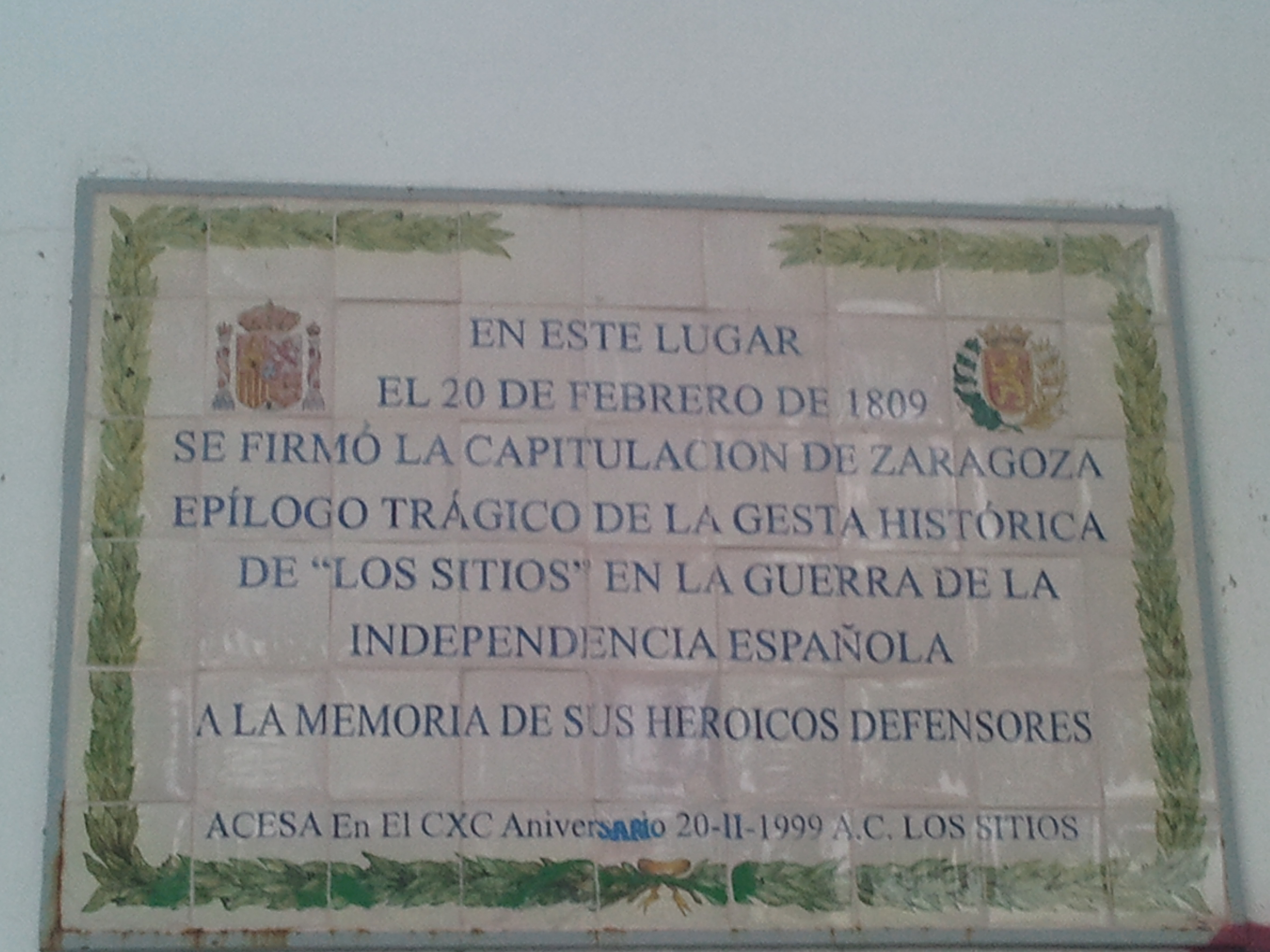
Commemoration of the surrender of the city of Zaragoza during the Sieges of the War of Independence

In the midst of these operations, the French arrived on December 1. That same day, the Casablanca batteries made their debut repelling a surprise French attack. On the 20th of that same month the position was strongly attacked, whose commander found himself overwhelmed and abandoned it after disabling the cannons. With this defeat, General Saint-Marq had to fall back from the canal defensive line toward the city.

During the subsequent second siege of the city, the building was used by the French army commanded by Jean Lannes as headquarters. After a hard struggle, the council that commanded the resistance with Palafox ill surrendered at the mill. A commemorative note on its walls recalls this use and the final capitulation of the city authorities at that place.

During the subsequent French occupation, the canal would be repaired and used as a supply route. Under the control of intendant Carlos Victor D'Hautefort, traffic multiplied, with the canal fleet reaching 15 boats. Uniquely, Casablanca was used as a place of executions to punish a contingent of Polish troops who had mutinied in the absence of governor Louis Gabriel Suchet on March 27, 1811.

=== Casablanca in the 19th century ===
The period following the Peninsular War was one of slow decline for the canal. Damage to the canal infrastructure caused by the French in their retreat limited traffic whose demand needed to await the reconstruction of severely damaged Zaragoza. In 1827 King Ferdinand VII and his wife María Amalia took advantage of their visit to Zaragoza to personally observe the canal's situation. During their journey on a specially fitted boat, they observed the latest works at the landing stage and the rural environment, which they compared to the Royal Palace of Aranjuez. Despite the abolition of the million contribution, which was paid in Aragon to finance the canal, various works were carried out to restore it including a restoration of the Casablanca locks, damaged in the frosts of 1829.

These efforts were not enough to make it profitable. Aragonese agricultural production—the canal's main commodity—decreased after the war. In addition, in the early 19th century grain transport by canal decreased in favor of navigation on the Ebro, reducing the relative importance of the port of Casablanca. Meanwhile, passenger traffic on the canal had to compete with the new stagecoaches to Tudela, inaugurated in 1842 and considerably more comfortable for travelers. These also had the advantage of arriving directly to the Navarrese city instead of stopping at El Bocal, on its outskirts, and allowing subsequent connections to Pamplona, Tolosa and Bayonne. Passenger service by boat was reduced to a frequency of four days a week, leaving at dawn, and at a cost of 30 reales.

In that context, the Diccionario geográfico-estadístico-histórico de España y sus posesiones de Ultramar (Geographical-Statistical-Historical Dictionary of Spain and its overseas possessions) of 1850 describes an area that has lost industrial interest. It does not mention flour activity at the mill in the industry section, in contrast with explicit mentions of key facilities that take advantage of the canal downstream and toward which the industrial center of gravity shifted. On the other hand, it provides data on the canal's agriculture, which in the environment of Casablanca is favored by irrigation. It mentions the existence of the flour mill and fulling mills, as well as a census of the dozen boats that continued to provide service on the canal in 1850.

The most striking event at Casablanca in the second quarter of the century was its use for negotiations following the failed Carlist takeover attempt of 1838. With the assailants defeated after a brief initial success, the prisoners loyal to the Cristino government were released in an exchange decided there. Despite this apparent decline, in this agricultural area near the city other types of more recreational activities began to develop, as Madoz notes:

Moreover in Zaragoza pilgrimages of families to the pilots of Casa Blanca, Puente de Gallego, and to the infinite country and recreation houses that surround the city's outskirts are very frequent.

— Diccionario geográfico-estadístico-histórico de España y sus posesiones de Ultramar. p. 635

Thus, Casablanca became a place of recreation on the outskirts of the city, especially with the new urbanism of the 19th century that connects it with the avenue that serves as the entrance to the city from Valencia. A few years later, the Zaragoza Guide of 1860 describes the canal on the outskirts of Zaragoza in the same way:

From the [gate] del Cármen another [promenade] called Casa Blanca departs, to which its single tree-lined street on both sides leads, which extending more than half a league, ends at the locks of San Cárlos of the Imperial Canal.[...]

[Casablanca] This is a pleasant and delightful recreational site, surrounded by groves, which invites recreation, and which is favored with preference by all who wish to enjoy the delights of the countryside, its pleasant expeditions and friends' outings. A short distance from the Imperial Canal on the Valencia road, and in its lower part, is the house called San Cárlos, commonly Casablanca, which at first served as a warehouse and lodging for employees, and today is rented and serves as an inn, for those who like to go spend a day in the countryside.[...] In addition, the entire area of Casablanca is populated with infinite trees, groves and poplar groves, which embellish it extraordinarily.

— Guía de Zaragoza

The same guide indicates that productive and logistics activity had been maintained at the facilities. The flour mill continued operating in 1860 as well as the fulling mills. Passenger and goods traffic, although limited, had not yet disappeared. The guide describes regular service thus:

The company in charge of this service carries passengers and goods from Casablanca to Bocal, near Tudela.[...] Every day at four in the morning in winter, and at six in the evening in summer, a passenger boat departs, and the price of each seat is 40 rs. vn., the company also taking care of transport from this city to the landing stage, and from Bocal to Tudela, in coaches prepared for this purpose. On Sundays and Wednesdays the transport boat leaves at three in the morning, which carries arrobas and orders for the towns and farmhouses along the route. Passengers must be, one hour before departure from Casablanca, at the navigation administration, to board the carriages and be taken to the landing stage. The boats have uncomfortable seats and a well-served table; but they are susceptible to many and very necessary improvements, and it is greatly lacking that a determined number of passengers be set so that they do not make the crossing with discomforts, as frequently happens now.

— Guía de Zaragoza

However, technical advances were making the port of Casablanca obsolete. The arrival of the railway, a new means of transport, reduced river traffic importance and with the connection of Zaragoza to Barcelona in 1861 and the subsequent extension toward Pamplona and Bilbao through the Compañía de los Caminos de Hierro del Norte de España railway network, passenger and goods traffic gradually disappeared from the canal. The mill and fulling mills continued operating, as there is evidence of their operation by the heirs of Vicente Lahoz in 1867 and they are mentioned again in a new tourist guide that updated the one from earlier in the decade in 1869. This second guide from 1869 shows, by suppressing mentions of the port of Casablanca, that navigation had already disappeared against the push of the railway. Milling records disappear some years later when associated taxes stop being paid and in the 1880s the nearby bridge is used for the narrow-gauge railway from Cariñena to Zaragoza.

=== Casablanca in the modern era ===
In 1894, as part of electrification in Spain, the complex was converted into a hydroelectric power station with two turbines of 197.26 HP each. This energy was transmitted to the city through a 3 km power line that was pioneering in its time for using alternating current to bridge the distance to the city. The plant, which would eventually be expanded to 591.78 HP, and its subordinate network were originally operated by the Aragonese Electricity Company but the need to generate economies of scale led in 1904 to mergers that formed Eléctricas Reunidas de Zaragoza (ERZ), the region's main electricity company. The progressive concentration of the electricity sector in Spain led ERZ to participate in 1983 in the mergers that gave rise to Endesa, the current operator.

This new industrial use did not reduce its recreational use. As part of the renovation of Zaragoza for the Hispano-French Exhibition of 1908, trees were planted on the Canal promenade adjacent to the mill, currently called Casablanca. By that year, there already existed around the old mill some buildings that in the 1908 guide, "Zaragoza en tranvía" are described as:

There is a moment when due to the unevenness of the terrain, past a certain hotel whose name matches its purpose, one can see to the right a splendid landscape of wide and extensive horizon, in whose background the town of Casablanca and the mountains of Valdespartera are outlined imprecisely. Among the thickets appear multitudes of small buildings, towers and country houses that populate the garden, and among these, from stretch to stretch, stand out the tall minarets of some chimneys that are launching spurts of dense smoke that slowly spreads through the immeasurable celestial roof. The view of this landscape, which due to its varied and extensive nature seems a great panoramic canvas, infuses in us a feeling of well-being, a certain delicious fullness of life, formed by the impressions we draw from nature placed before our eyes

— José García Mercadal

Over time, that complex would grow to constitute a neighborhood of the city in its own right. The current nomenclature pays homage to these origins. In addition to the already mentioned "avenida de Casablanca" (Casablanca avenue), there is a "calle del Embarcadero" (Landing stage street) (near the old port) or "calle de la Vía" (Railway street) (on the former route of the railway to Cariñena).

The power station at the locks was renovated and expanded in 1985 and today has a power of 600 kW. It consists of vertical-shaft Kaplan turbines to turbine a flow of 10 m³/s. The plant remains run-of-the-river type and has a production of 2672 GWh/year.

In the year 2000, the Diputación General de Aragón (Aragonese Regional Government) initiated proceedings for its declaration as an Asset of Cultural Interest as part of the historic complex of the Imperial Canal of Aragon. Pending final approval, it is provisionally protected as such. Shortly after, and amid the actions related to the International Exhibition of 2008, the park surrounding the old mill was included, like the rest of the urban section of the imperial canal, in the green ring of Zaragoza.

== Image gallery ==
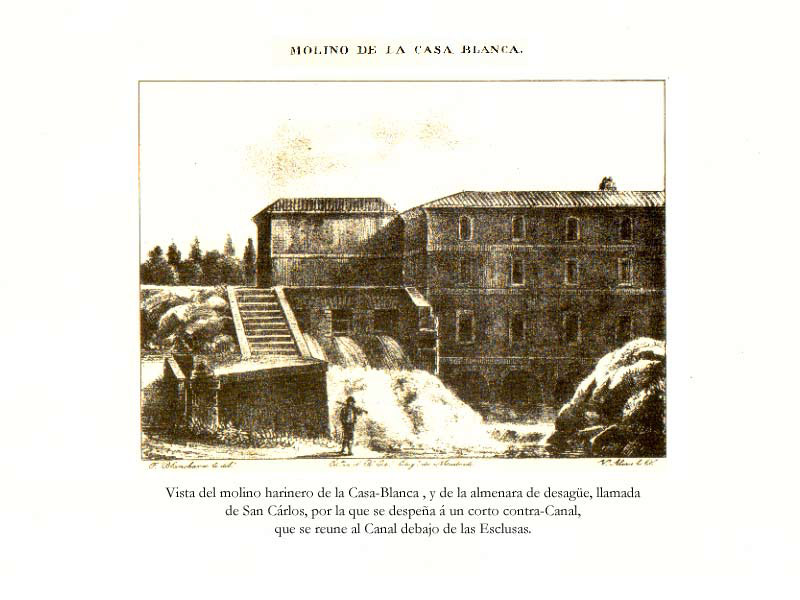
Old engraving of the Casablanca mill in 1833.

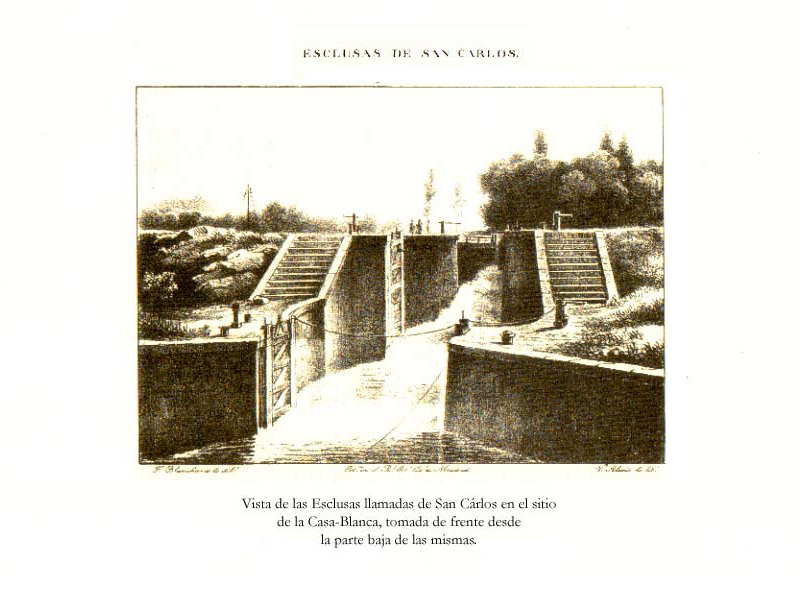
Old engraving of the locks in 1833.

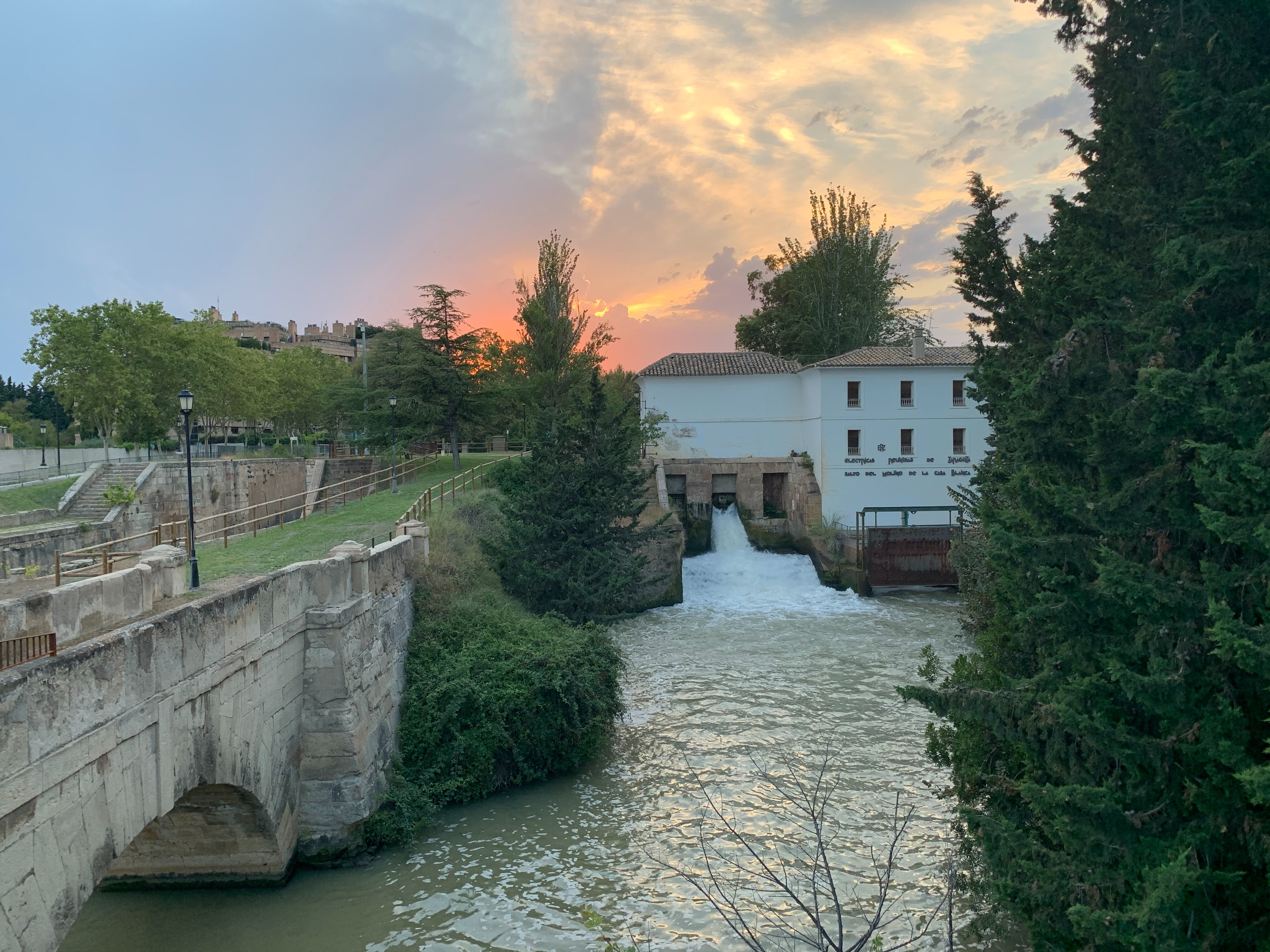
The complex today

== See also ==
- Imperial Canal of Aragon
- Canal de Isabel II
- Canal de Castilla
