= Imperial Canal of Aragon =

Irrigation and navigation channel in Spain

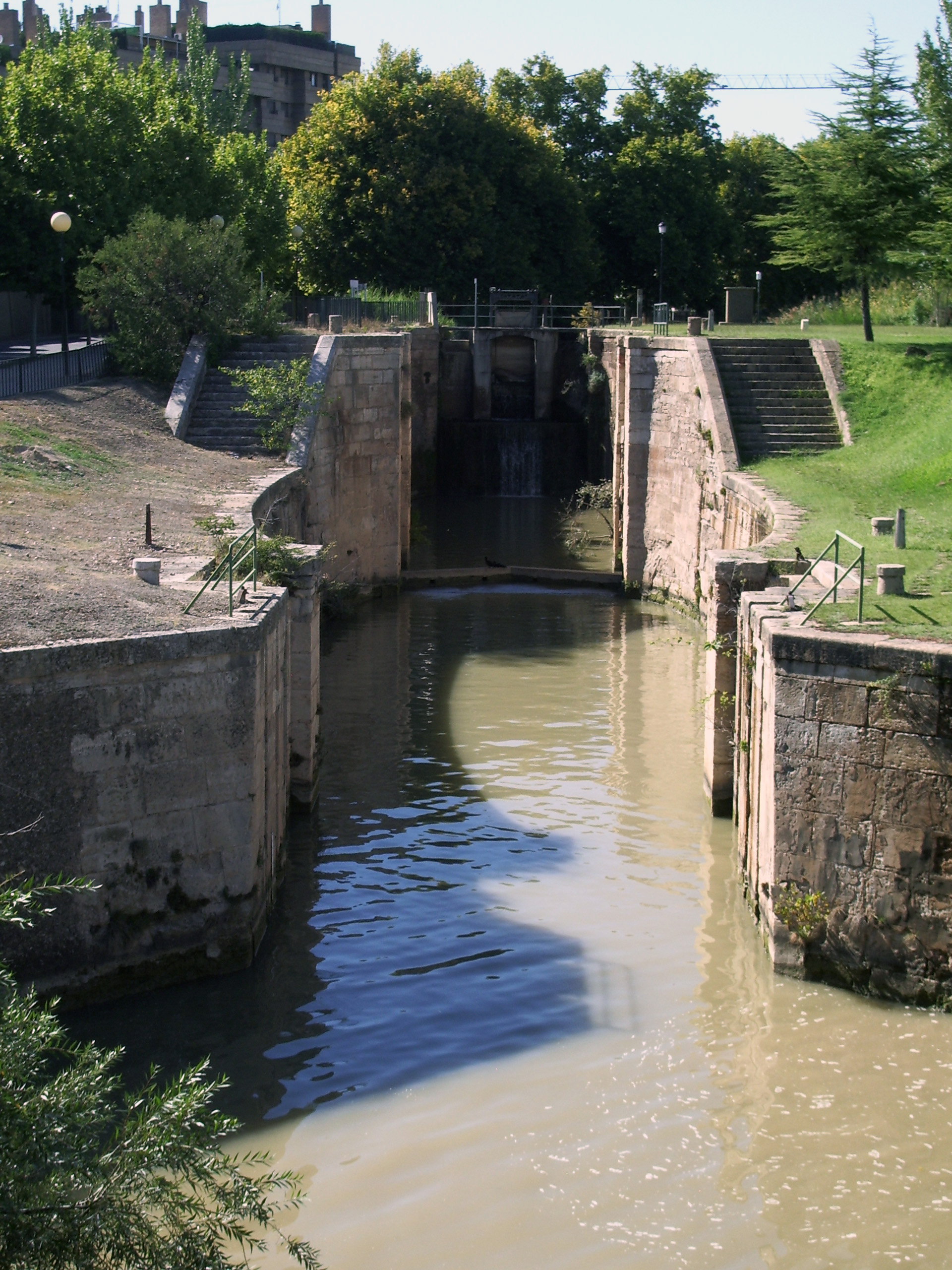
- Location: Spain
- Coordinates: 42.026264°N 1.560233°W
- Type: Ebro Basin
- Part of: Bocal de Fontellas, Navarre
- Primary outflows: Fuentes de Ebro, Aragon
- Max. length: 110 km (68 mi)

Location
- Interactive map of Imperial Canal of Aragon

The Imperial Canal of Aragon (Canal Imperial de Aragón; Aragoiko Kanal Inperiala) is a 110-kilometre (68 mi) zanja and navigation canal built from 1776 to 1790 between Fontellas (Navarre) and Fuentes de Ebro (Aragón). Its construction was intended to improve the irrigation of the old Acequia Imperial de Aragón, bringing water from the Ebro River to Zaragoza and allowing the irrigation system to be extended in the region. It also established a passenger and freight transport service between Tudela and Zaragoza.

== History ==
=== Origins ===
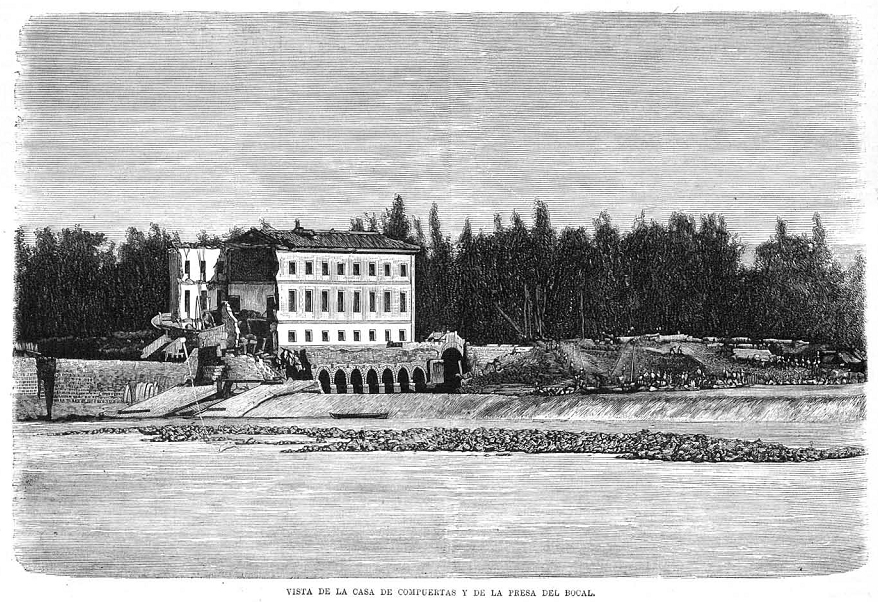
View of the Casa de Compuertas and the "Presa del Bocal", after the damages suffered by a sinking in August 1874, in La Ilustración Española y Americana.

The plan was designed during the Enlightenment to build canals in Spain along the lines of England and France. The canal projected in the 18th century had two aspirations:

- The Ebro would communicate with the Atlantic Ocean through the Zadorra and Deva rivers (Guipúzcoa) or through Laredo (Cantabria), with the Douro through the Canal of Castile, and with the Mediterranean through the Canal of Amposta.
- The old Aragonese idea of obtaining an outlet to the sea that would allow them to export their products directly, mainly agricultural products.

Only a part of the entire project was carried out, with substantial investments and additional works.

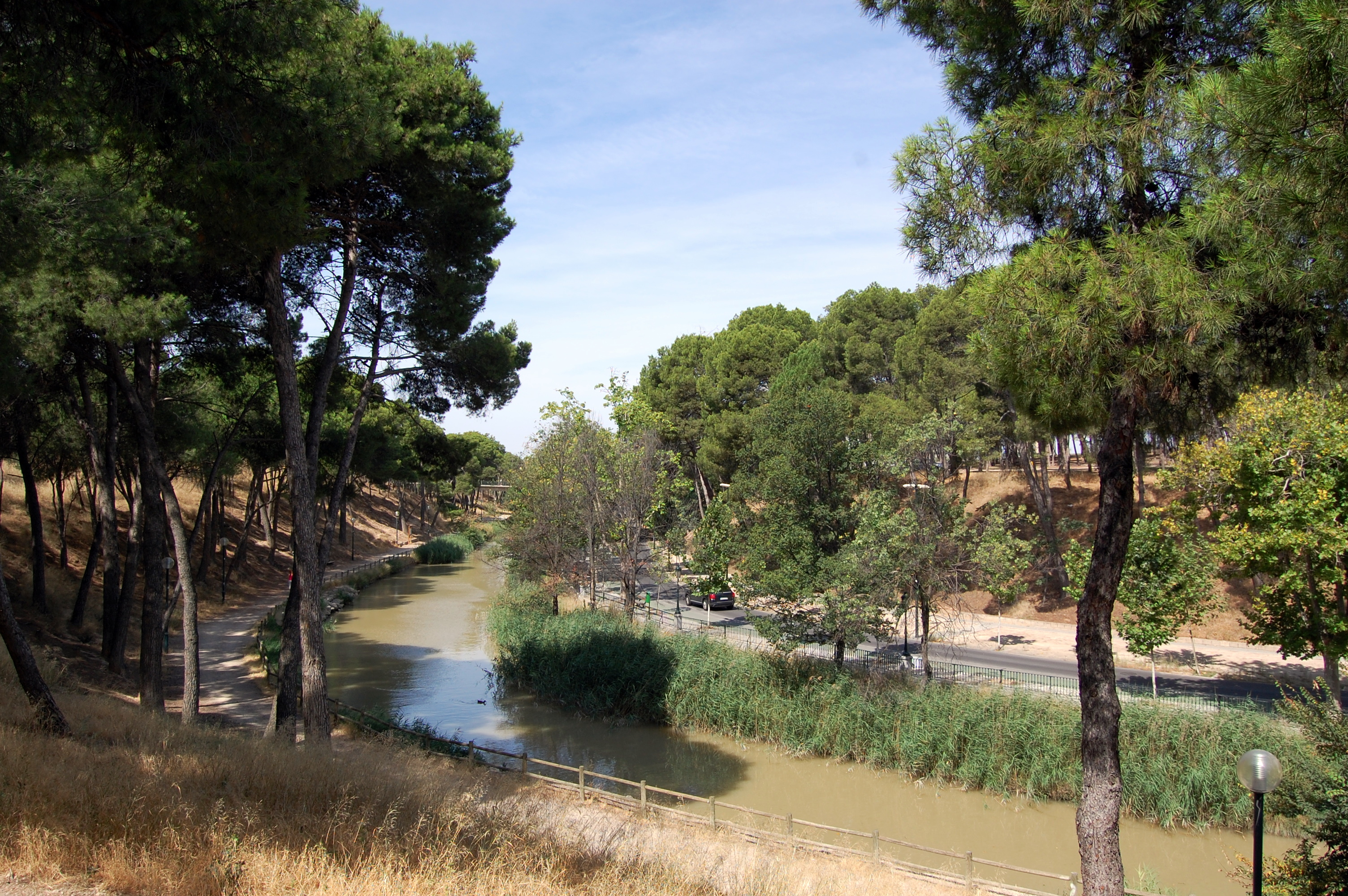
Imperial Canal of Aragon (Pinares de Venecia in Zaragoza).

=== Construction ===
The Imperial Canal of Aragon was a hydraulic work of the first order in its time. Emperor Charles I promoted its creation and Juan Cabrero, Archdeacon of Zaragoza, had given 2000 ducats to begin its construction, from Gallur, in May 1528. In 1771 the Council of Castile, presided over by the Count of Aranda, created the position of protector with powers to make all kinds of reforms necessary for the achievement of the enterprise, appointing his brother-in-law Ramón Pignatelli to occupy it. In 1776 the works were resumed with a new rhythm and a new construction plan was approved. It had three objectives: irrigation supply, source of energy and means of communication.

He materially built the channel and the civil works (1776-1790), overcoming all kinds of obstacles such as the El Bocal weir, the great Acueducto del Jalón, the channel to Zaragoza, a multitude of bridges and beacons, the Casablanca locks and mill, the Ojo del Canal, the Acueducto del Barranco de la Muerte, the Valdegurriana locks and another set of locks for downstream navigation. He also built the institution's offices in Zaragoza, in what is known as Casa del Canal.

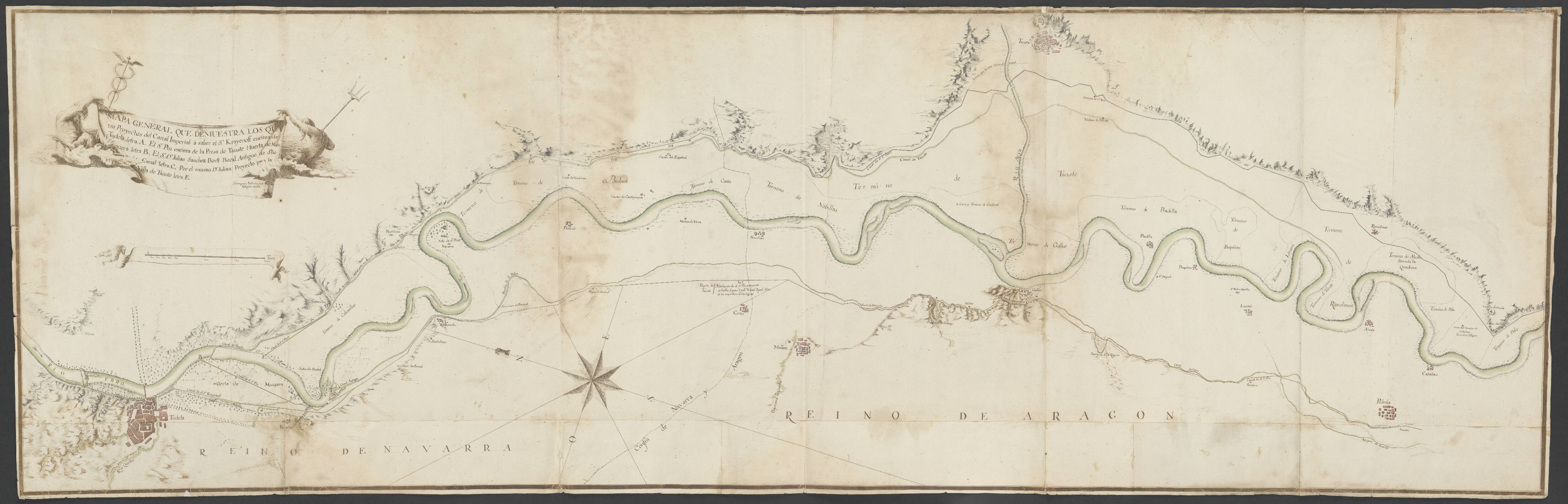
Imperial Canal of Aragon 1776 Gregorio Sevilla

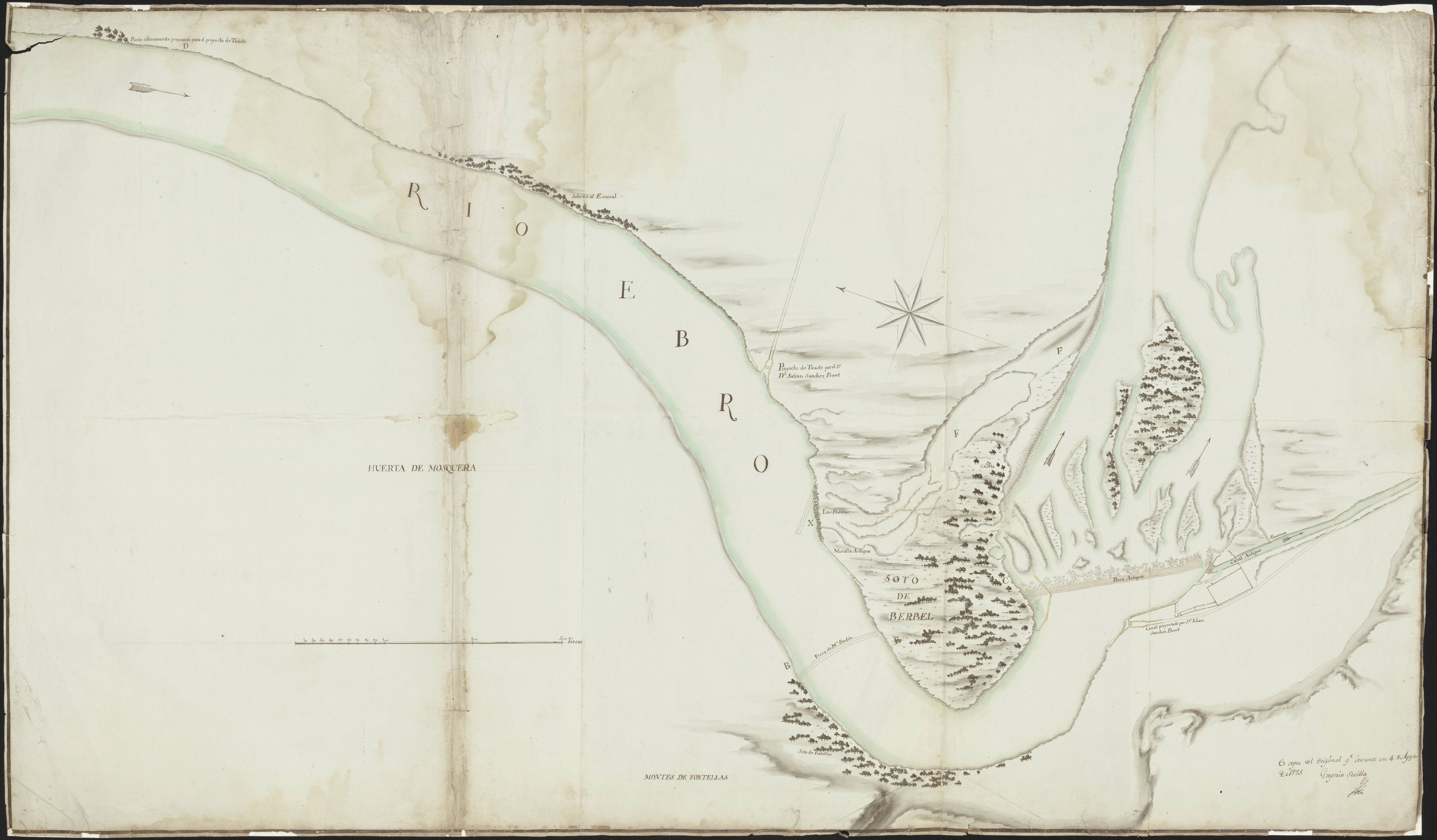
Imperial Canal of Aragon 1775 Gregorio Sevilla

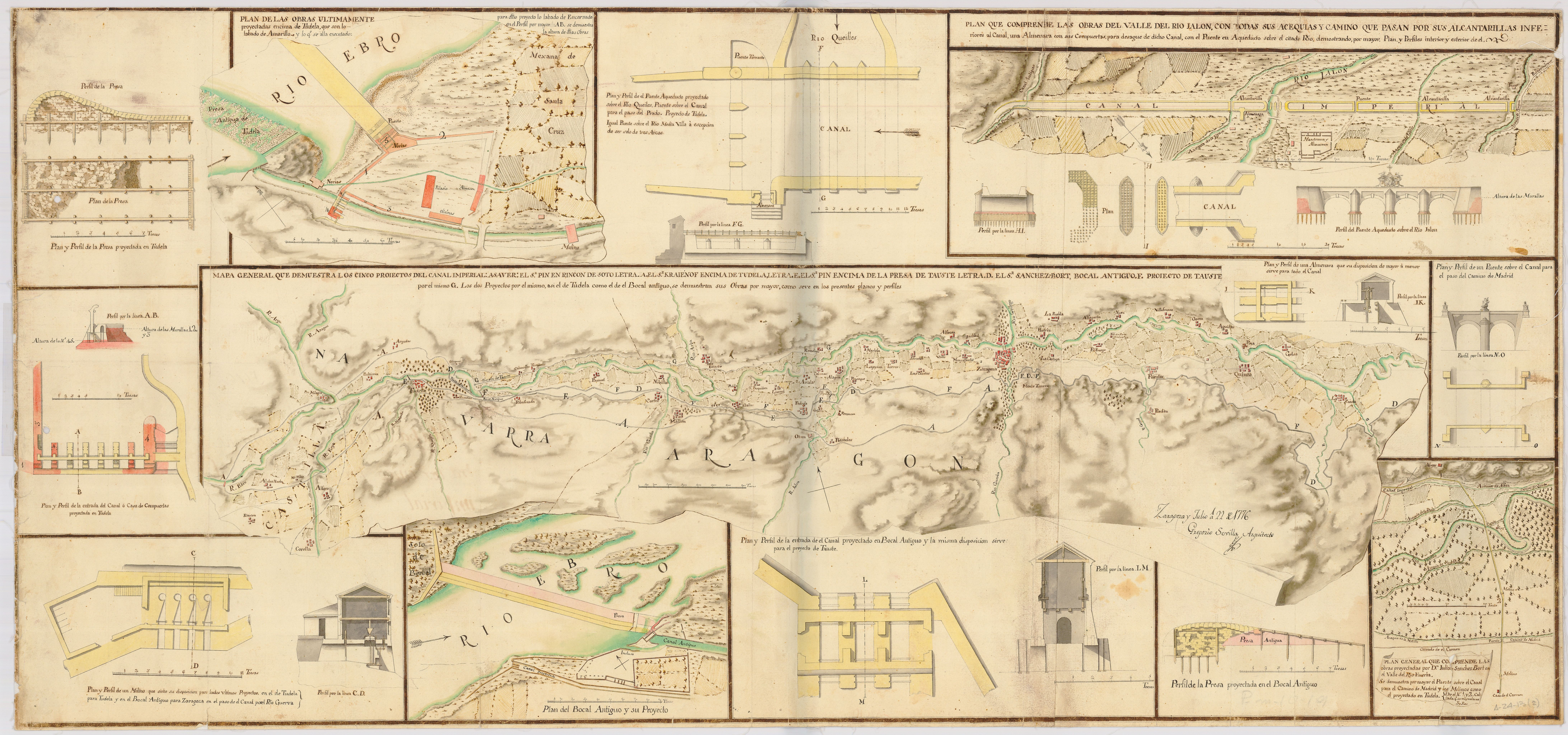
General Map showing the five Projects of the Imperial Canal of Aragon Gregorio Sevilla 1776

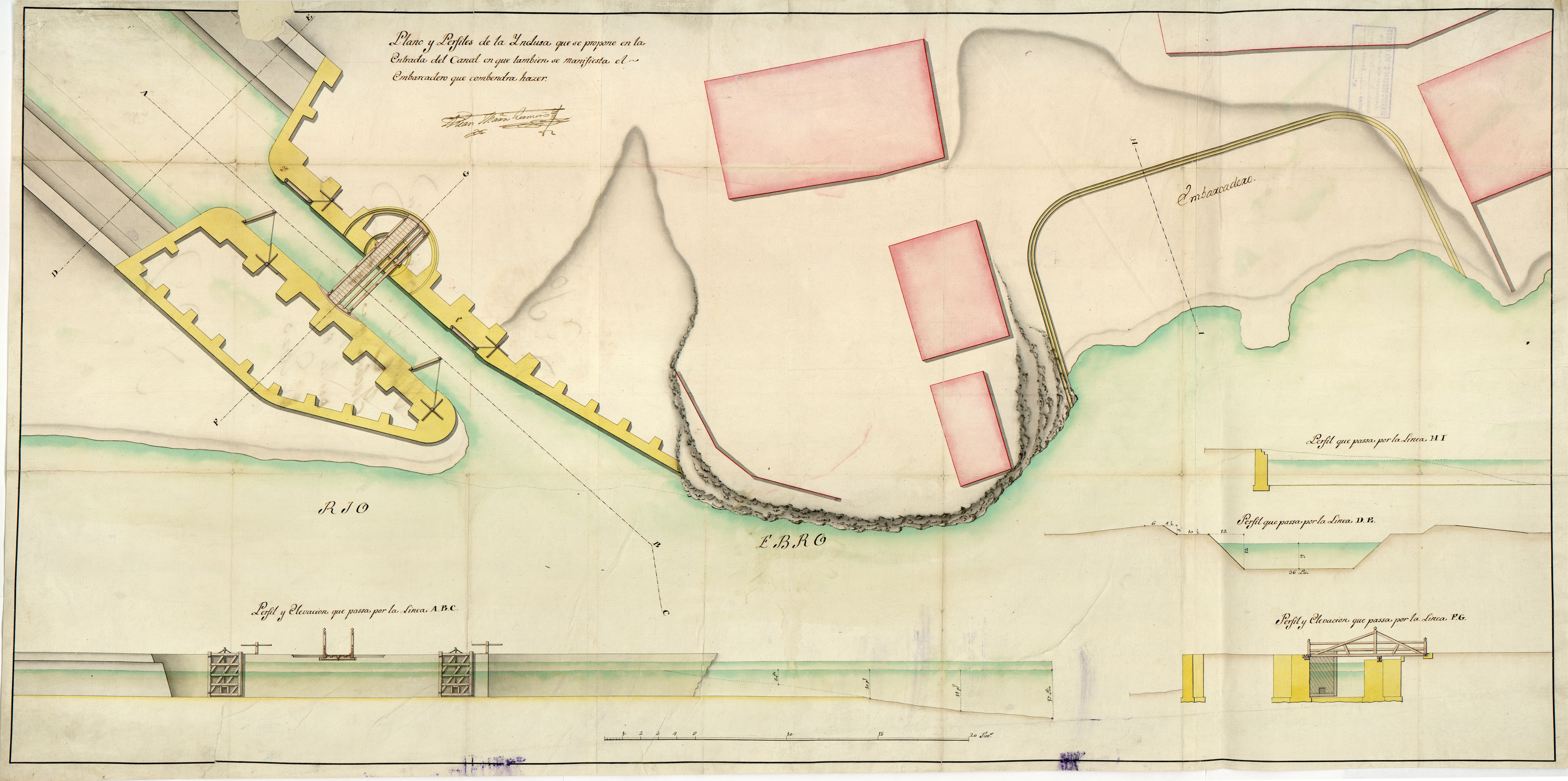
Plan and Profiles of the proposed Ynclusa at the entrance of the Canal, which also shows the wharf that will be built / Juan Martín Zermeño.

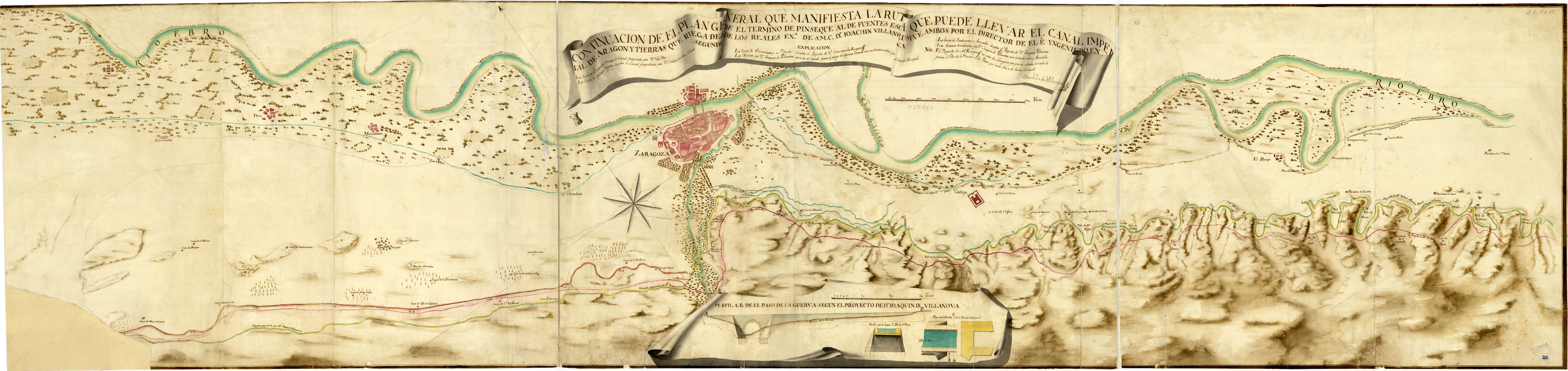
Continuation of the general plan that shows the route that can take the Imperial Canal of Aragon and lands it irrigates from the royal exs. of S.M.C. Dn. Joachin Vilanova including both by the Director of the second / Joachin de Villanova.

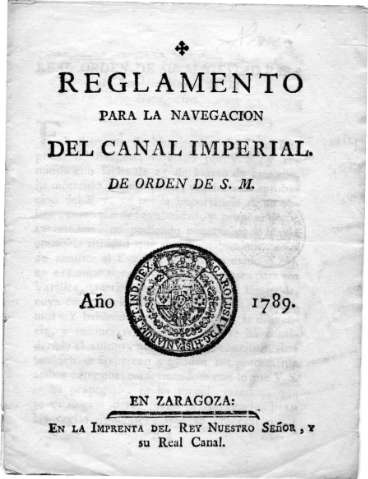
Regulations for the navigation of the Imperial Canal by order of S.M. (1789) - Spain. King (1788-1808: Charles IV).

He organized the navigation through it (1789) within a plan of integral navigation of the Ebro to communicate the Cantabrian and Mediterranean seas. He conditioned and included in the enterprise the Tauste Canal (1781).

On August 15, 1790, the 110 km Imperial Canal of Aragon was completed after laying the last stone of the El Bocal dam, in Navarre.

== Infrastructure and individual works ==
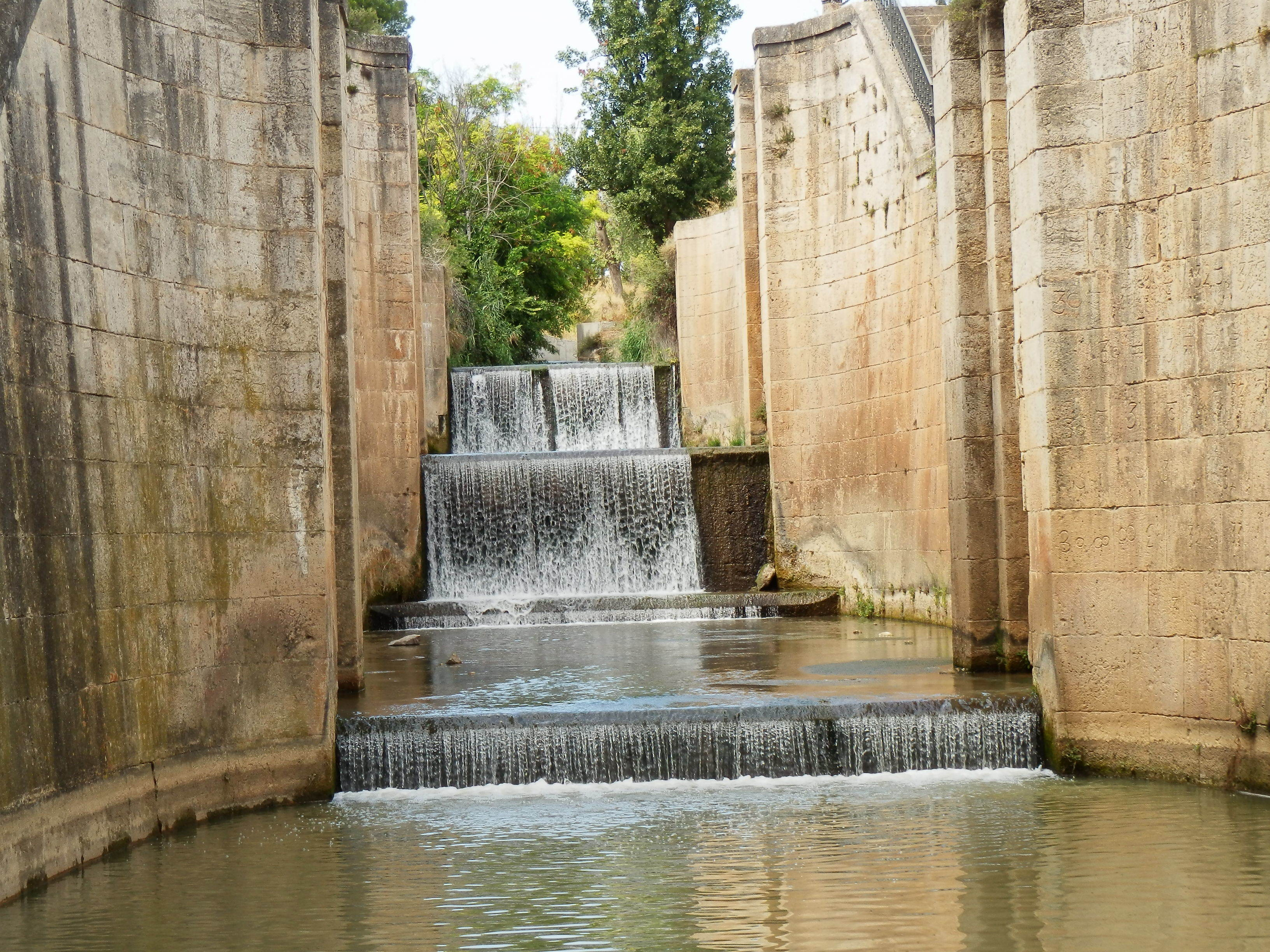
Valdegurriana locks of the Imperial Canal of Aragon in Zaragoza.

=== Locks ===
With a total gradient of 125 meters over its entire 110 km length, the slope of the Canal is only 80 cm/km (0.08%), which makes navigation in both directions possible.

Three groups of locks were built on the Canal, which are located in the municipality of Zaragoza, where the Canal has a gradient of 30 meters:

- At km 81: Casablanca locks. They regulated the level of the Canal before crossing the Huerva River and were part of the port of Casablanca. They are not currently in use. Next to them was a flour mill with 6 millstones.
- At km 89: Valdegurriana locks. The four locks of Valdegurriana, at the end of the Torrero mountains of Zaragoza, have a total waterfall of 13 meters. They have an oval floor plan and a meticulous ashlar construction. At the entrance to these locks is the Almenara de San Bernardo, which was in charge of the floodgates and the distribution of irrigation water. They are not currently in use.
- At km 91: The three locks on the Torrecilla road have a waterfall of 9.75 meters and are currently in ruins.

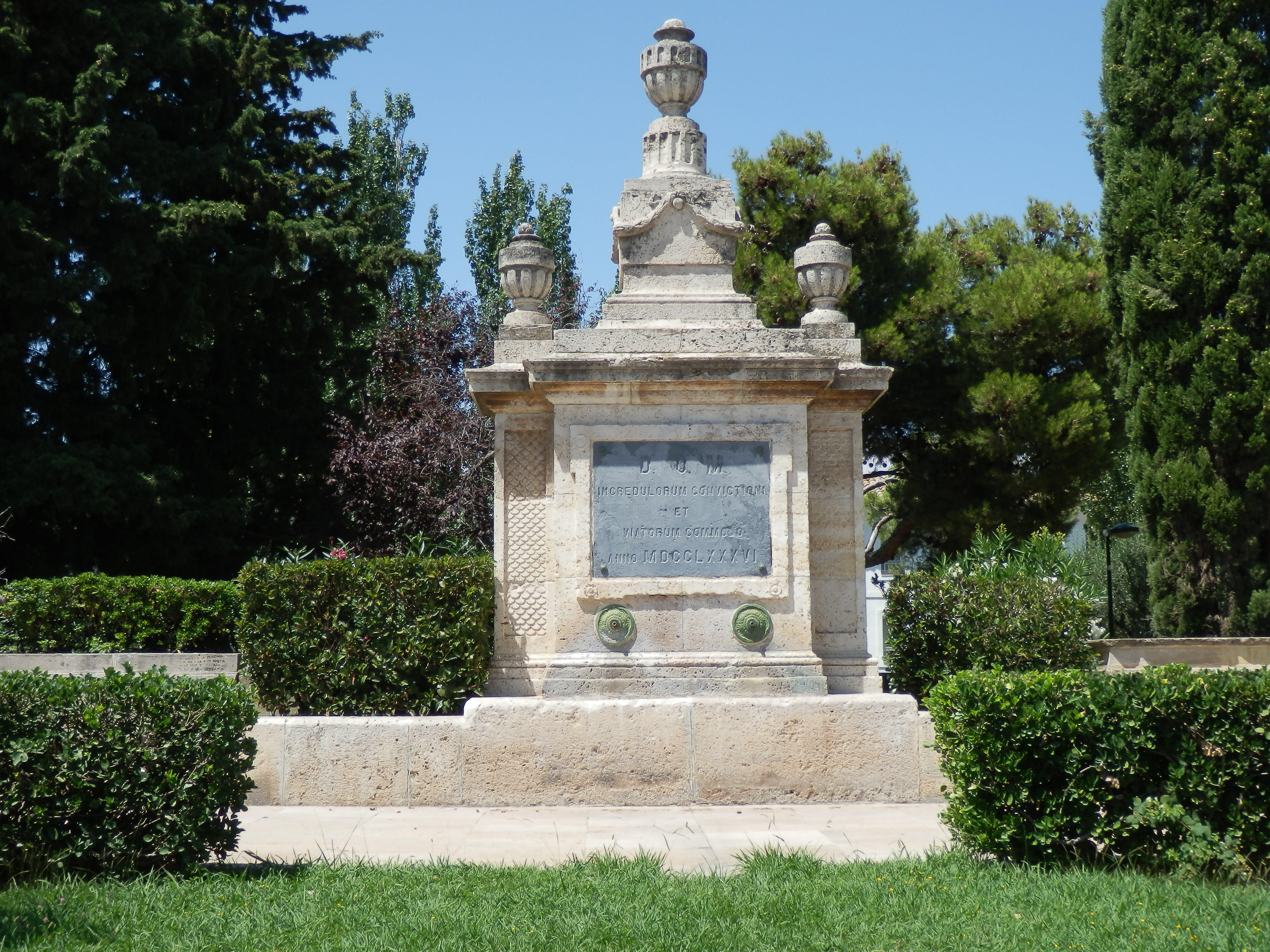
The Fountain of the Unbelievers commemorates the arrival of the waters of the Imperial Canal of Aragon to Zaragoza.

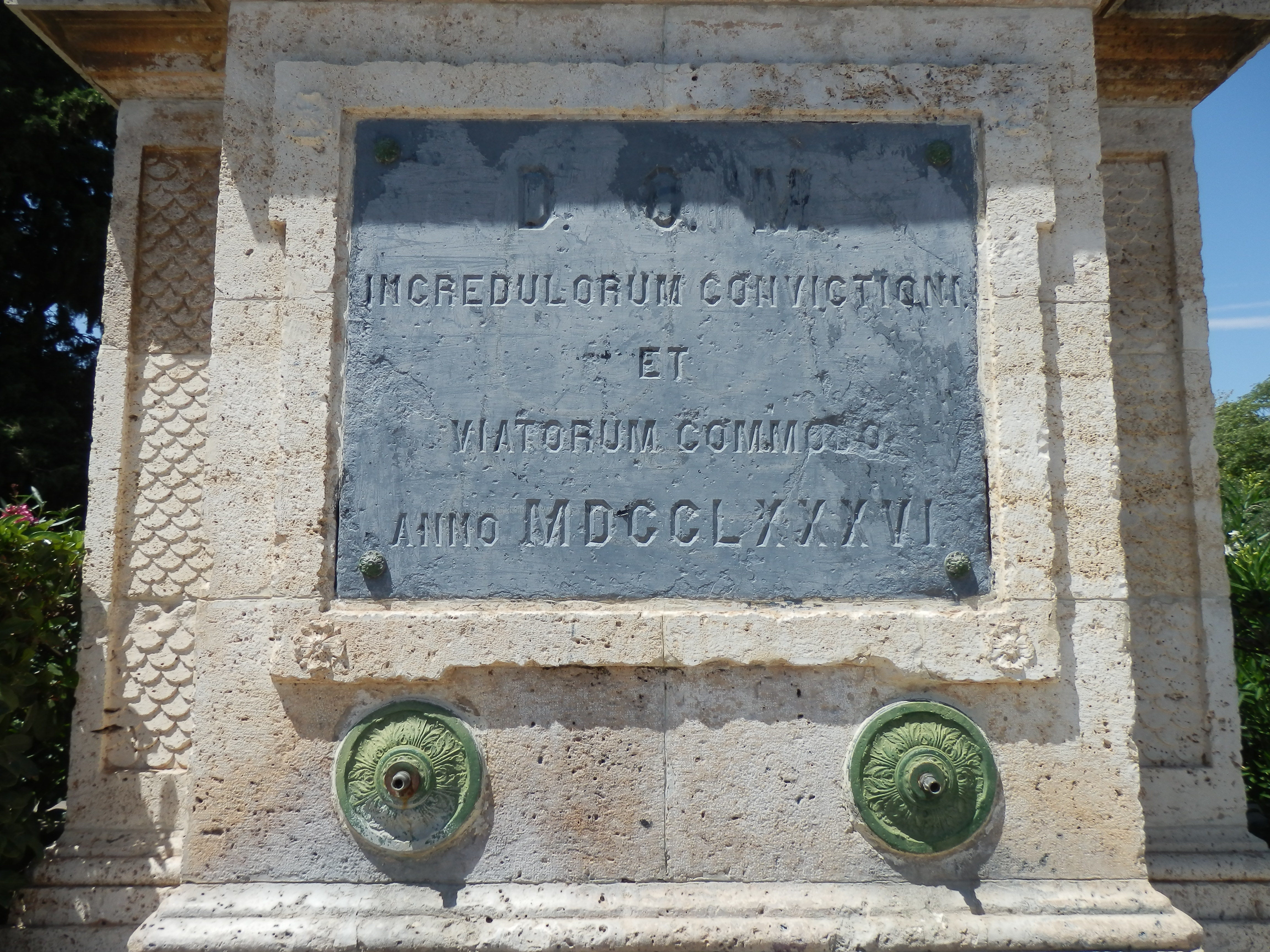
Incredulorum convictioni et viatorum commodo. Anno MDCCLXXXVI.

=== Fountain of the Unbelievers ===
In 1782, the works of the Imperial Canal of Aragon reached Zaragoza, the waters of the Ebro crossed the Jalón River, the bridge over the Huerva River, and the so-called locks of San Carlos were built.

The water reached Zaragoza on June 24, 1784, through a wooden canal and finally on October 14 of the same year, the architect of the work arrived in Zaragoza on board a barge, received by the people and authorities with joy.

The main works lasted two more years, so that on November 30, 1786, the Port of Casablanca was inaugurated, which included two locks for the passage of ships and a flour mill. The following day the Port of Torrero was inaugurated. A few days later, the first fountain ordered by Pignatelli was installed as proof of the arrival of water to Zaragoza, hence its inscription:

Incredulorum convictioni et viatorum commodo. Anno MDCCLXXXVI (English: To convince unbelievers and to bring rest to travelers. Year 1786)

== Agrarian reform ==
The main consequence of bringing water to Zaragoza through the Imperial Canal was an agrarian reform also carried out by Pignatelli. Its social impact was produced thanks to the extension of the irrigation extension that allowed everyone to ensure and regularize harvests avoiding subsistence or food crises, very common at the time. It also made it possible to cultivate and distribute uncultivated land.

Aware of the poverty of the peasantry, he conceived a great enterprise similar to those undertaken in France, Holland and England: a canal linking the Cantabrian Sea with the Mediterranean, an old Aragonese dream, to export their livestock and fruit and vegetable products. So that, in addition to serving as a commercial and postal communication because it would be navigable, with its abundant flow it would supply irrigation to fertile but dry lands, which would be bought at low prices by the less favored classes for whom the project was really intended. His political and social thinking was tinged with a radical reformism tending to favor the farmer over the privileged.

The need to irrigate all the land (from 1782) and to change and effectively collect the contribution for irrigation (from 1788), key points of the agrarian reform undertaken, led him to litigate with nobles such as the Marquis of Ayerbe, the Duke of Villahermosa, with the same chapter to which he belonged and the dreaded Ranchers' House of Zaragoza, which was a stronghold of the cattle oligarchy. The large landowners found it more profitable to leave certain lands uncultivated and use them for extensive grazing of their cattle.

== Navigation ==
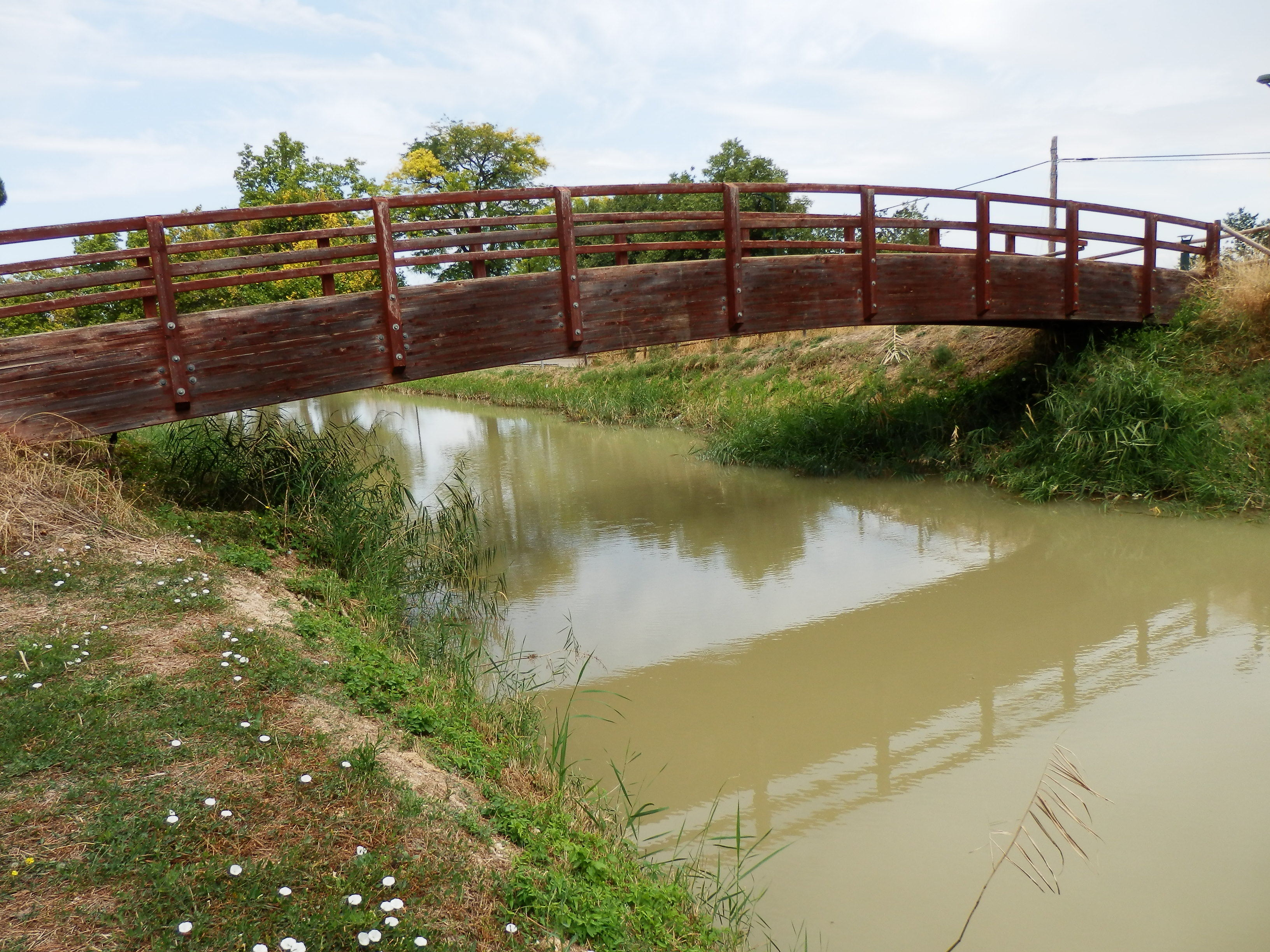
Imperial Canal of Aragon.

As for navigation, the other purpose of the canal, it was never fully achieved, since the riverbed was not extended below Zaragoza. In the 19th century, an attempt was made to extend the channel to Tudela and to build locks in Zaragoza to connect it with the Ebro, but this idea, due to the high costs involved, was never carried out.

Canal navigation, which has lasted until recently, was established by Pignatelli. It began operating in 1789 and offered a freight and Transport service. In 1833, J. Palacios wrote:

In the 16 leagues that the Canal has in the navigable day from the Bocal to Zaragoza, the public does not cease to have a known interest, since it transports by water all its goods and fruits of any kind they are, for which there are very well conditioned transport boats, and whose freight is extremely cheap and comfortable. The same happens with the transport of people, for which there is another class of boats, covered and in the shape of cars or tartans, with seats on both sides, which offer all possible comfort. Three of these boats go up and down every week from Zaragoza to Bocal, the two of these being the diligences that have been established since last year, which make the trip in one day, both going and returning, and in some seasons of the year they are full of people, not being in others so crowded with travelers, who in any case are very pleased to have a trip so soon and comfortable by water, being so doing it by land is much more painful, long and uncomfortable.

The existence of customs between Navarre and Aragon hindered the interregional traffic of goods; nevertheless, the canal effectively fulfilled its diminished role as a means of regional communication. Traffic reached a certain volume in the last years of the 18th century but was cut off due to the War of Independence. By the middle of the 19th century, it had recovered, but the establishment in 1861 of the new Zaragoza-Alsasua railroad, with a route parallel to that of the canal, brought traffic to a halt. The construction of other railroad lines caused the ideas of extending the canal and making the Ebro navigable to lose strength; however, neither disappeared.

== Map ==
The Imperial Canal of Aragon runs for 110 km between Fontellas (Navarre) and Fuentes de Ebro (Zaragoza).

Route of the Imperial Canal of Aragon

== Current status ==
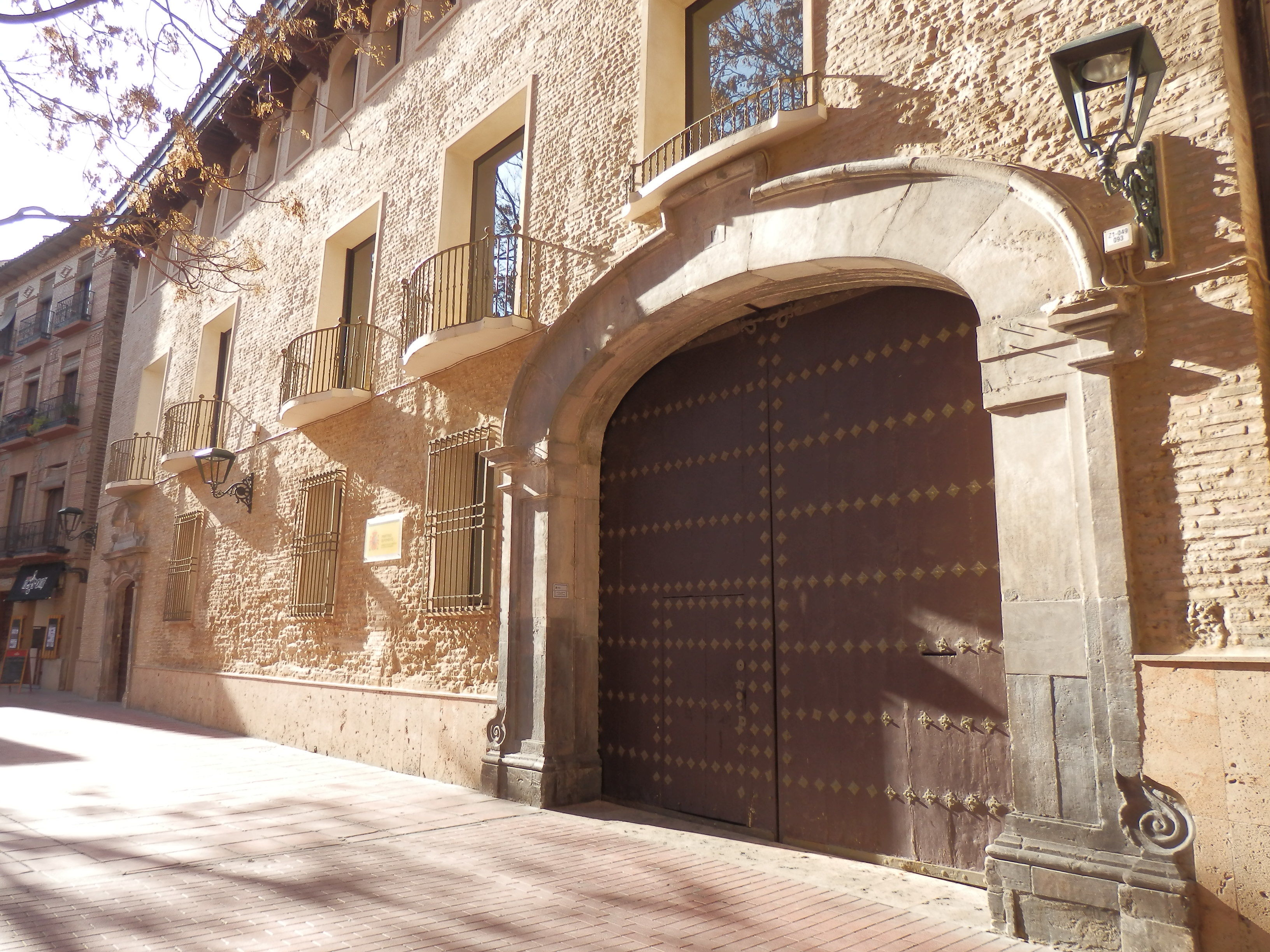
Casa del Canal or Casa de los Tarín.

Since 1818, the offices were located in the so-called Casa del Canal, in the Plaza de Santa Cruz in Zaragoza.

Currently the offices of the General Community of Users of the Imperial Canal of Aragon are located at number 1, Avenida de America in Zaragoza. The building contains the archives and library of the institution, with interesting collections of the eighteenth century.

The irrigation of the canal is divided into three zones composed of the following communities:

- Upper zone: Soto de la Noria del Marqués de Fontellas, Ribaforada, Buñuel, Cortes de Navarra, Mallén-Novillas, and Gallur.
- Middle zone: Boquiñeni, Luceni, Pedrola, Alcalá de Ebro, Cabañas de Ebro, Figueruelas, Acequia de Cascajo en Grisén, Jalón de Alagón, Garfilán de Torres de Berrellén, Castellar de Torres de Berrellén, Madrid-Centén, término de Almozara, Centén de Utebo, and Pinseque, Alagón and Peramán.
- Lower zone: Garrapinillos, Miralbueno, Miraflores and El Burgo de Ebro.

The canal is currently managed by the Confederación Hidrográfica del Ebro, which in turn is an autonomous agency of the Ministry of Agriculture, Fisheries, Food and Environment.

== Gallery ==
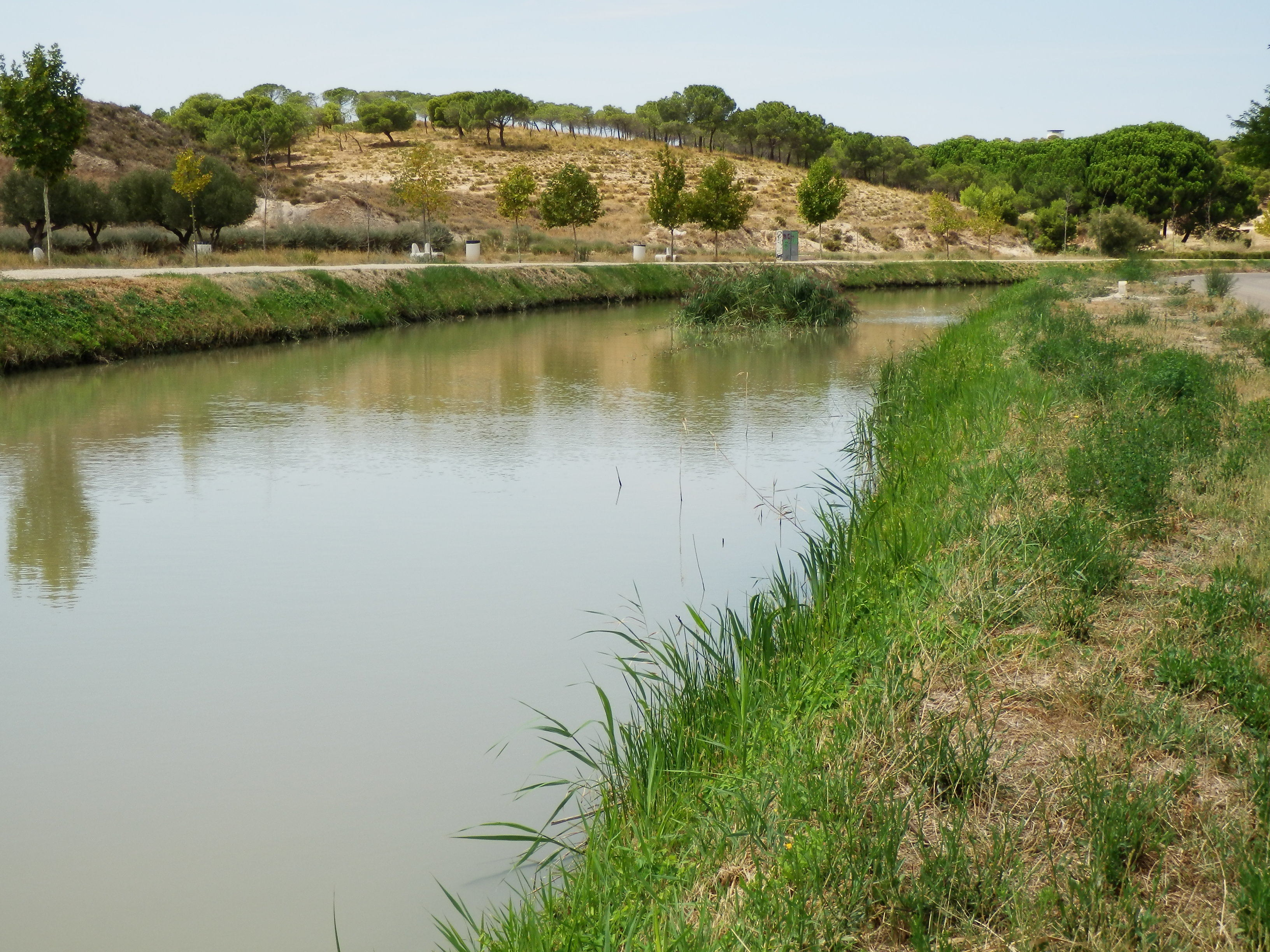
Canal in Zaragoza

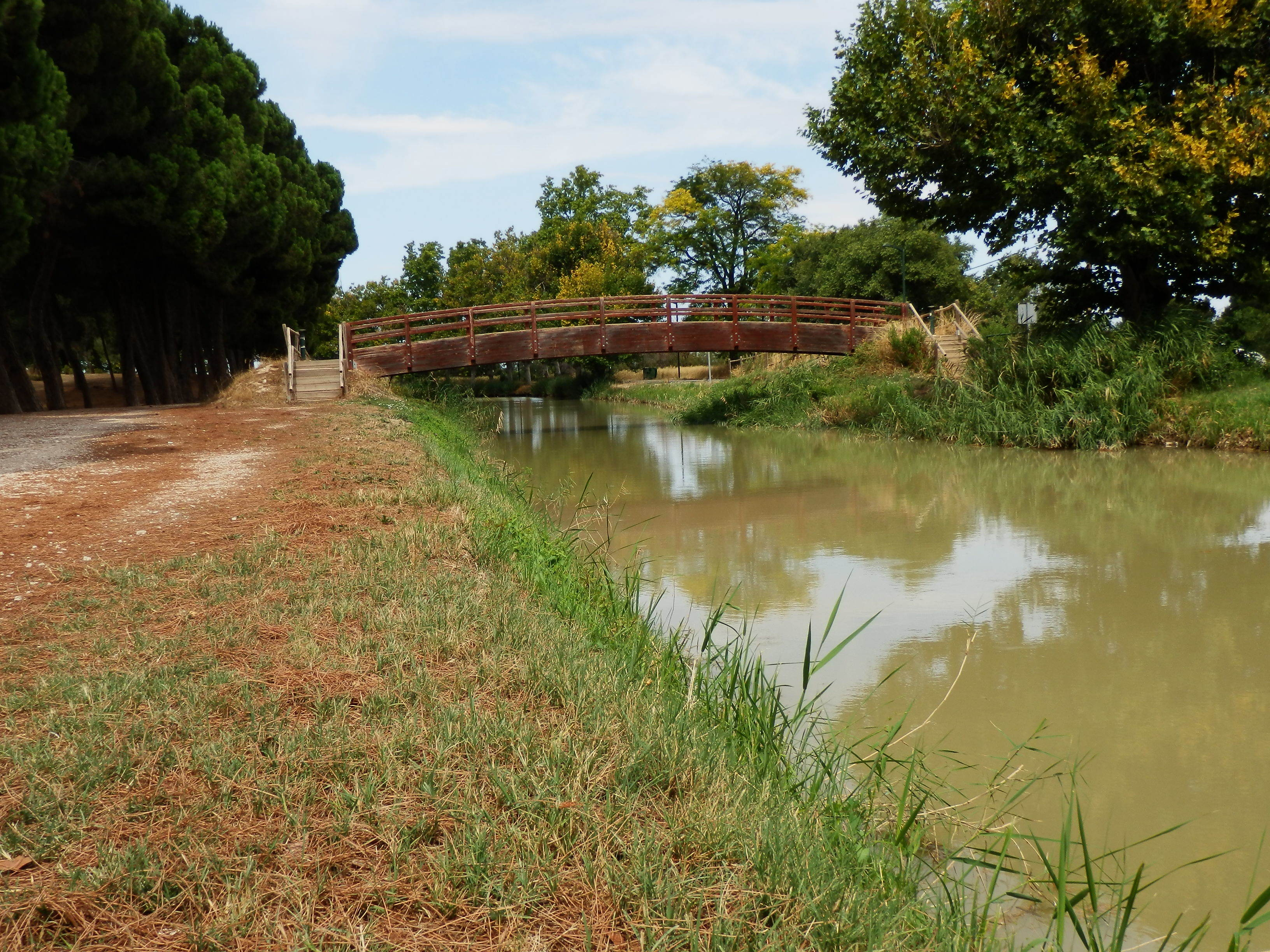
Canal in Zaragoza

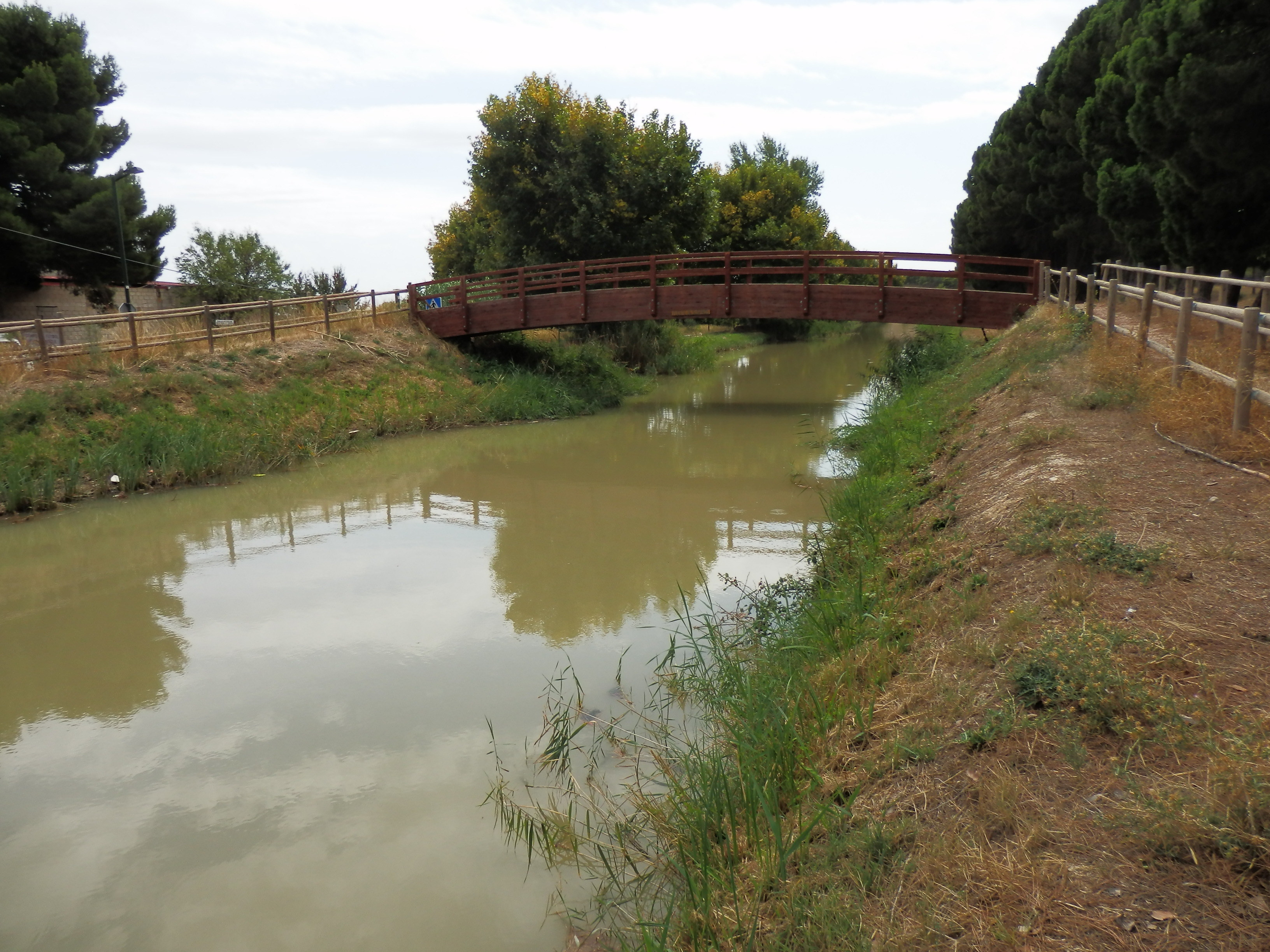
Canal in Zaragoza

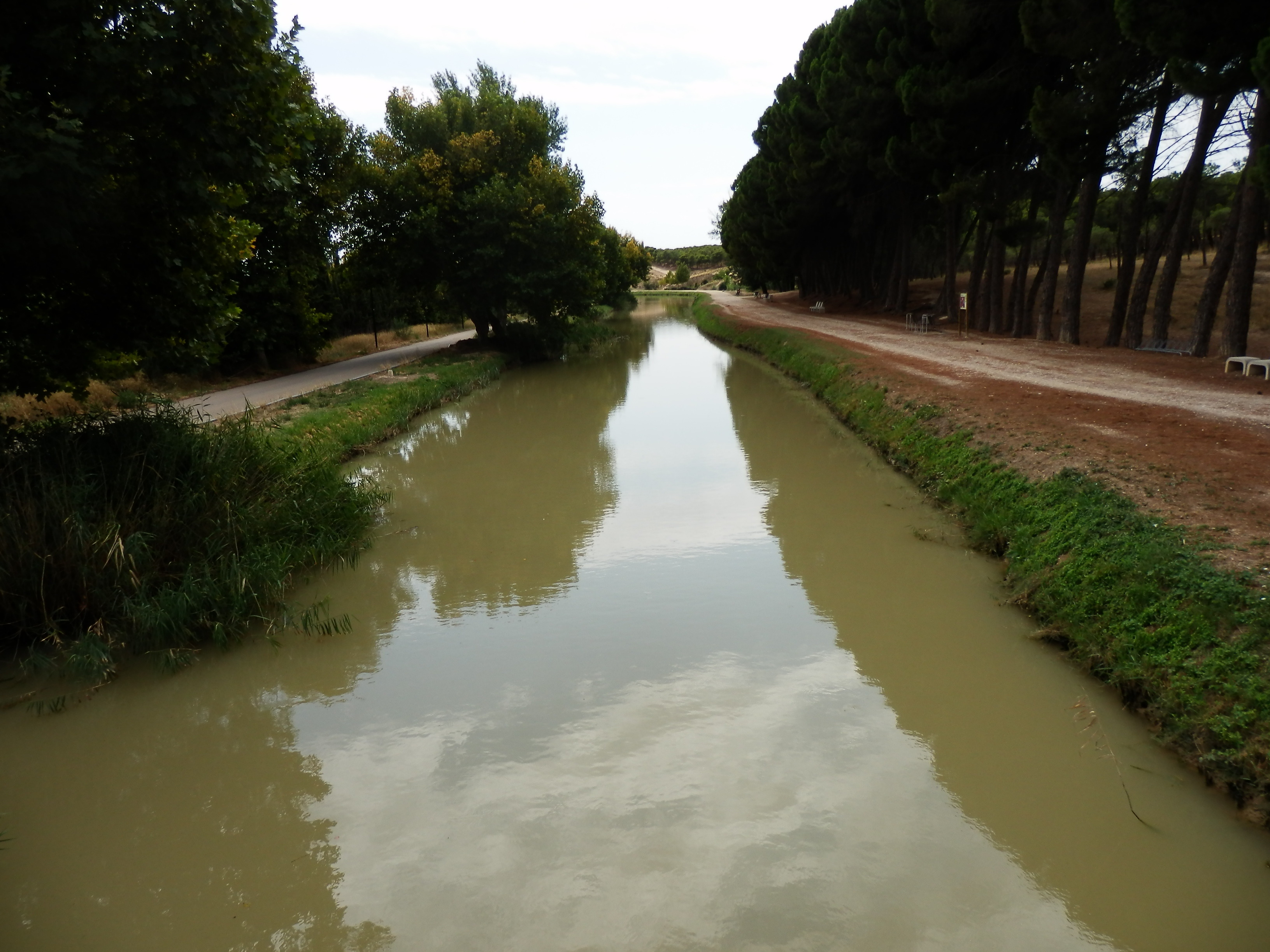
Canal in Zaragoza

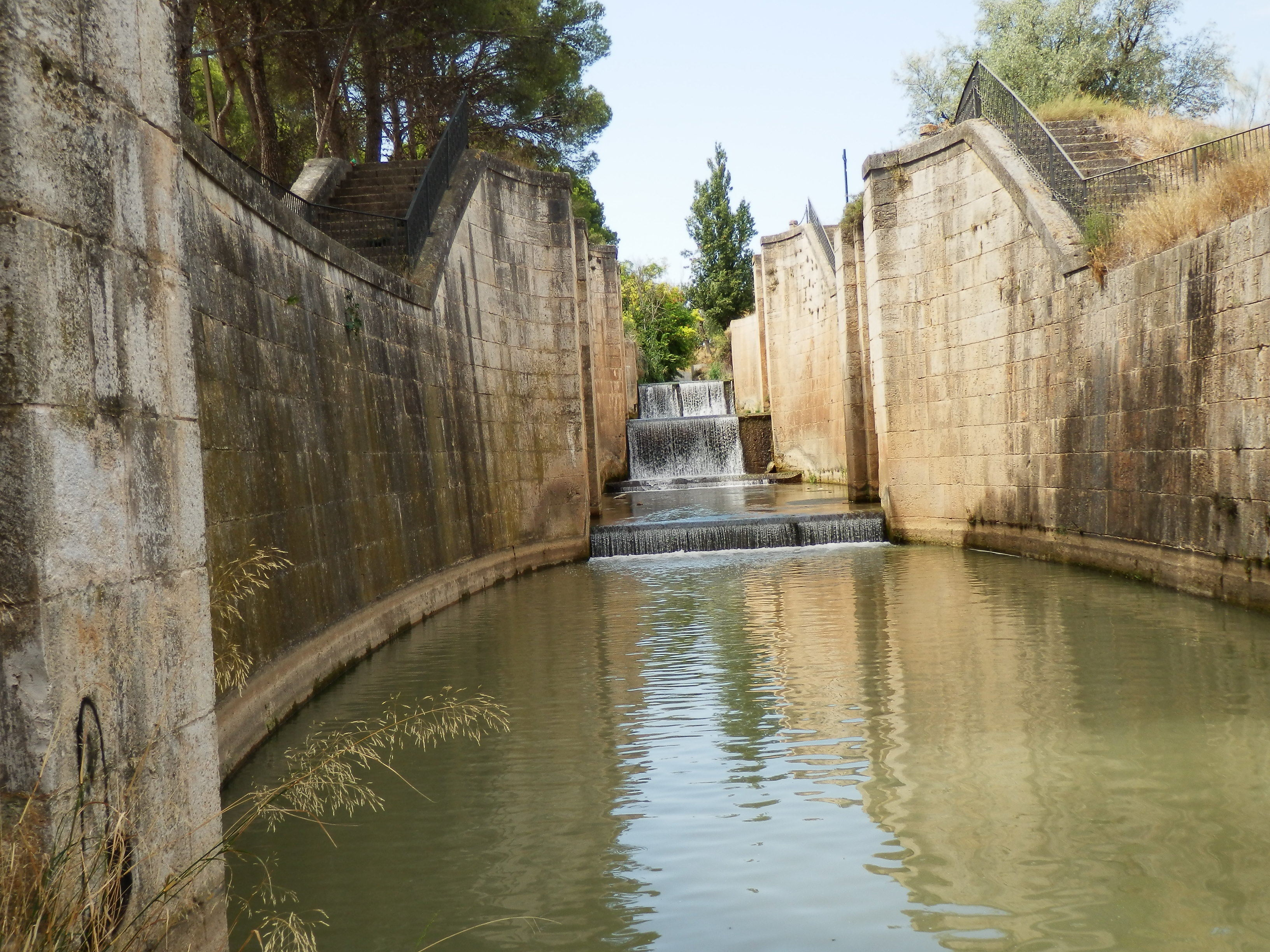
Valdegurriana locks

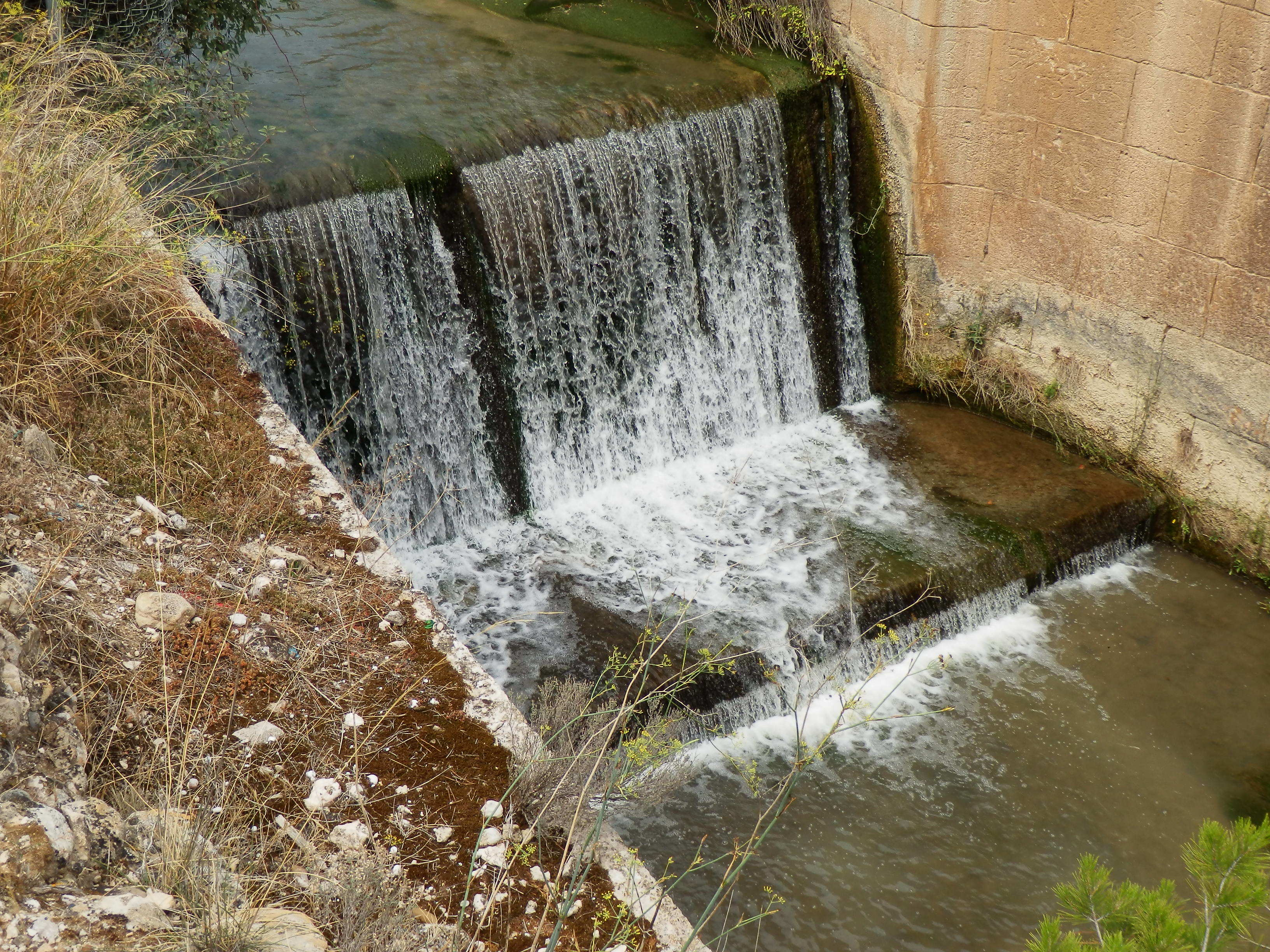
Valdegurriana locks

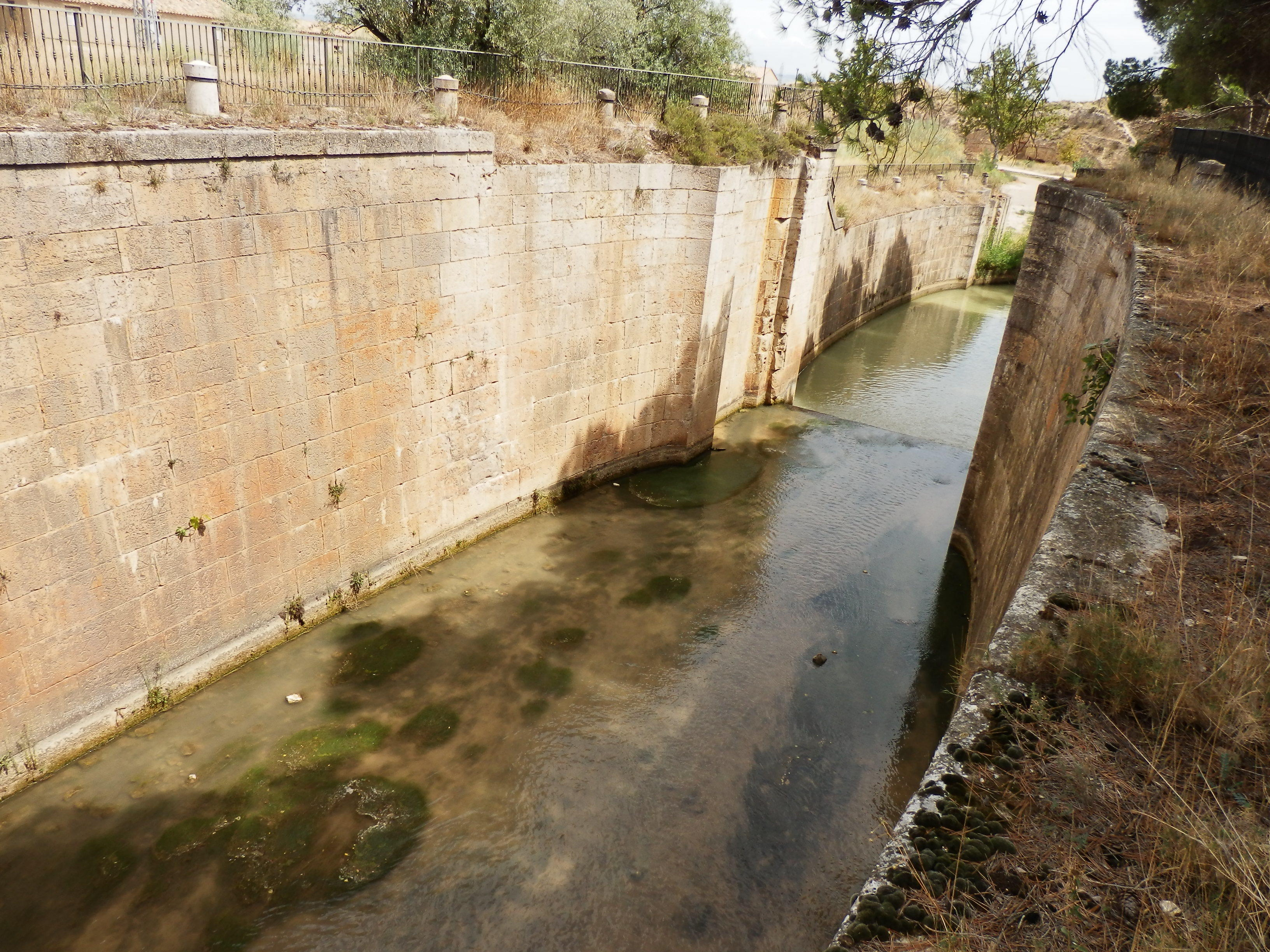
Valdegurriana locks

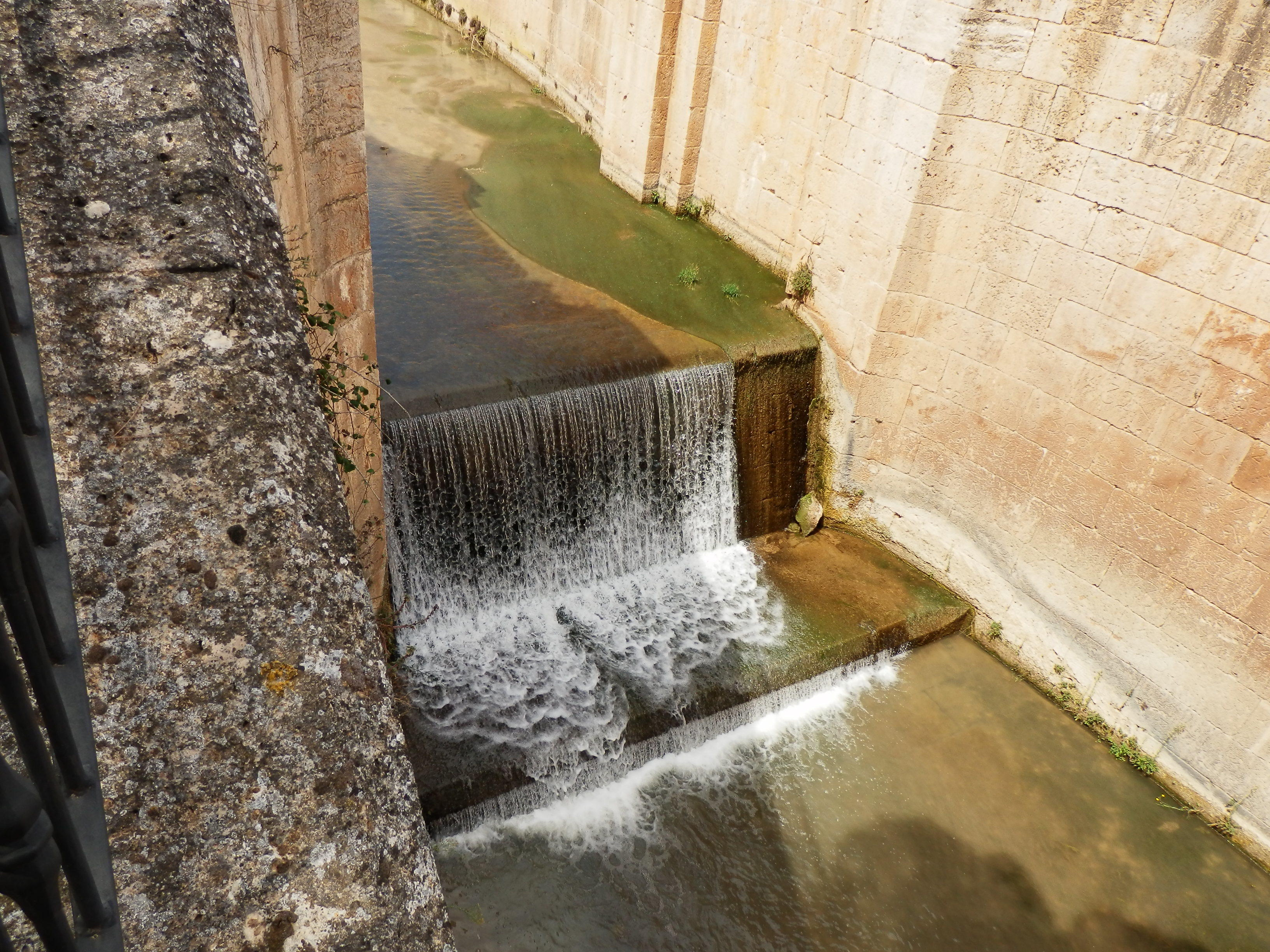
Valdegurriana locks

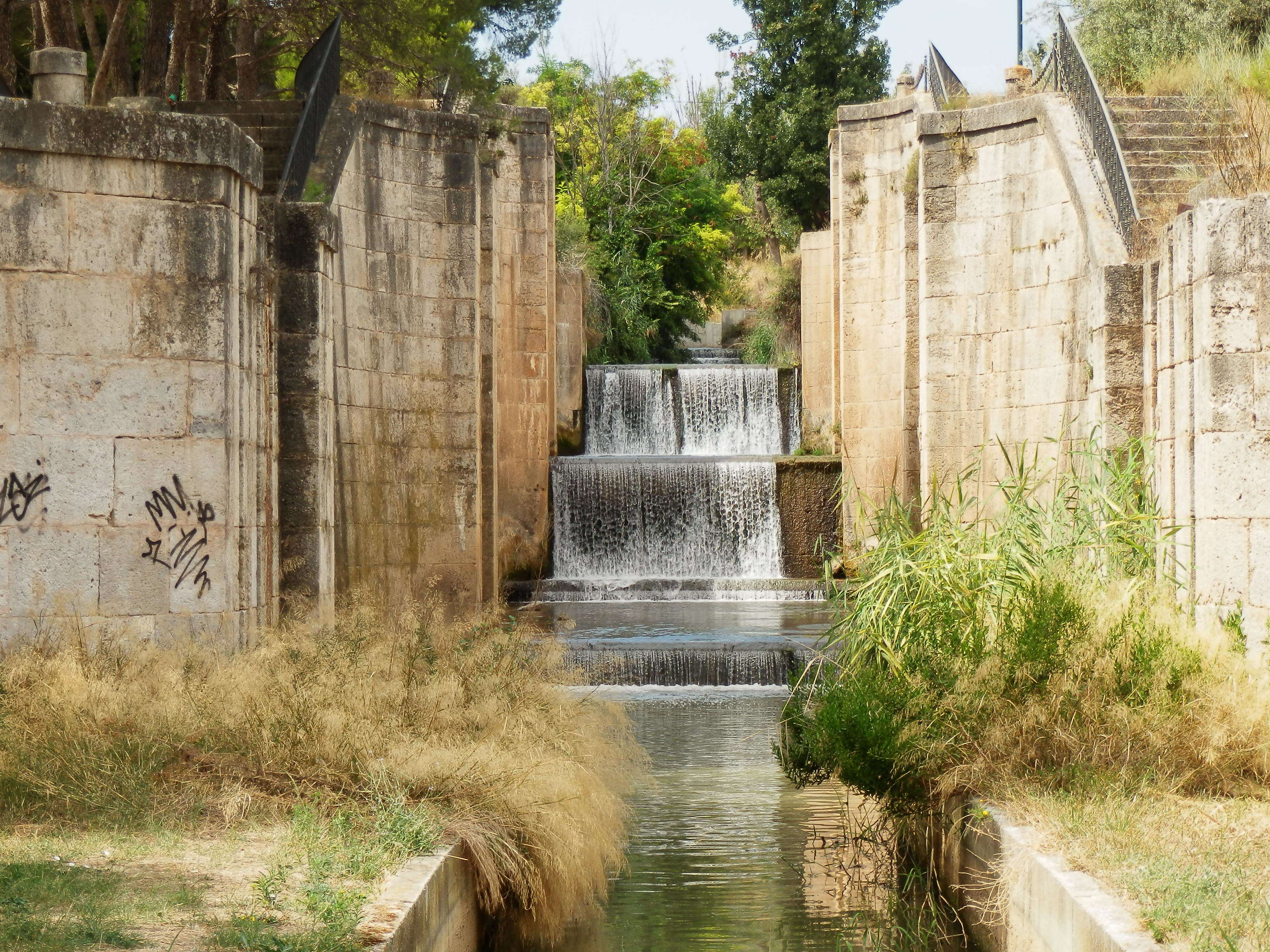
Valdegurriana locks

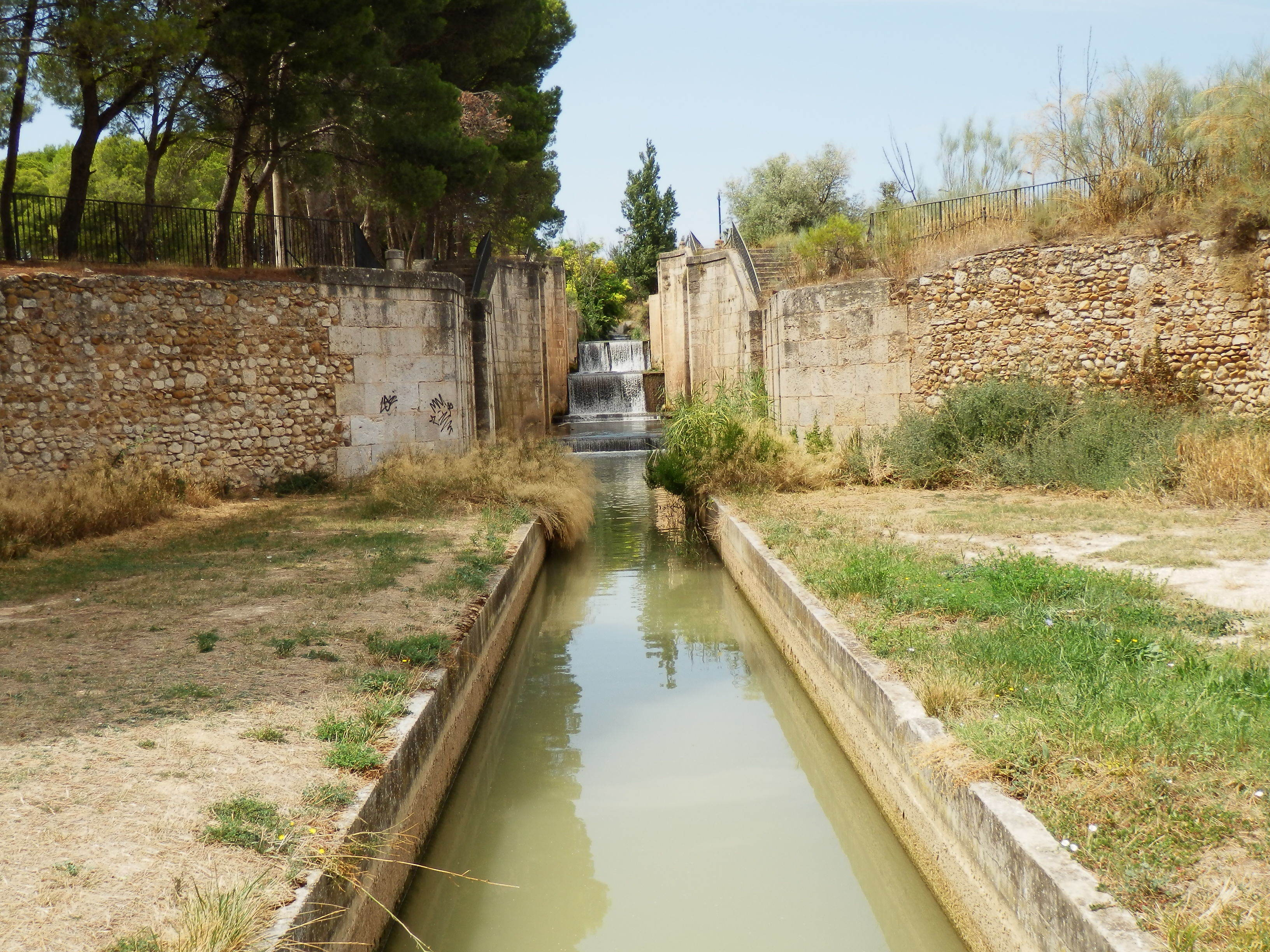
Valdegurriana locks

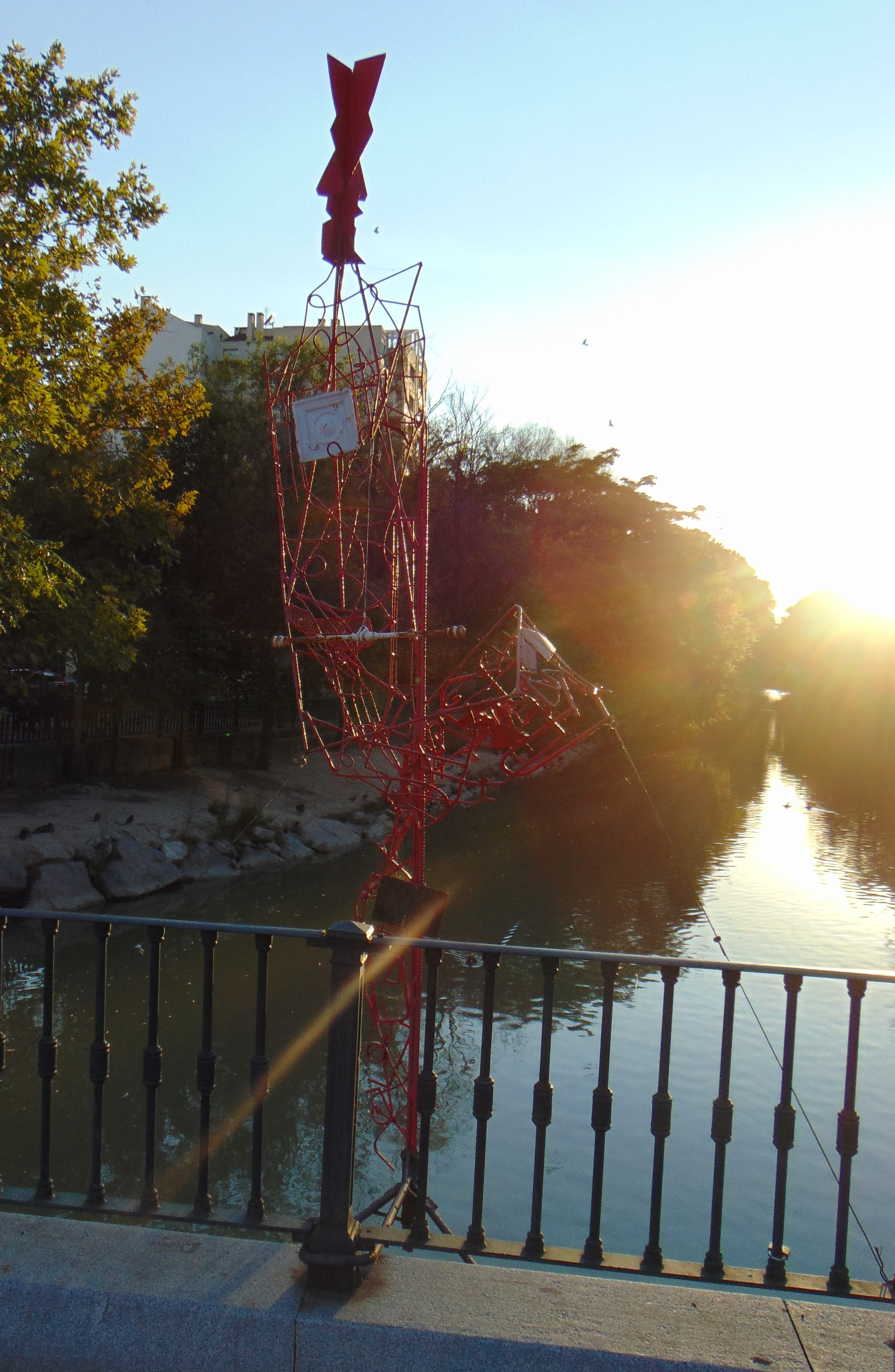

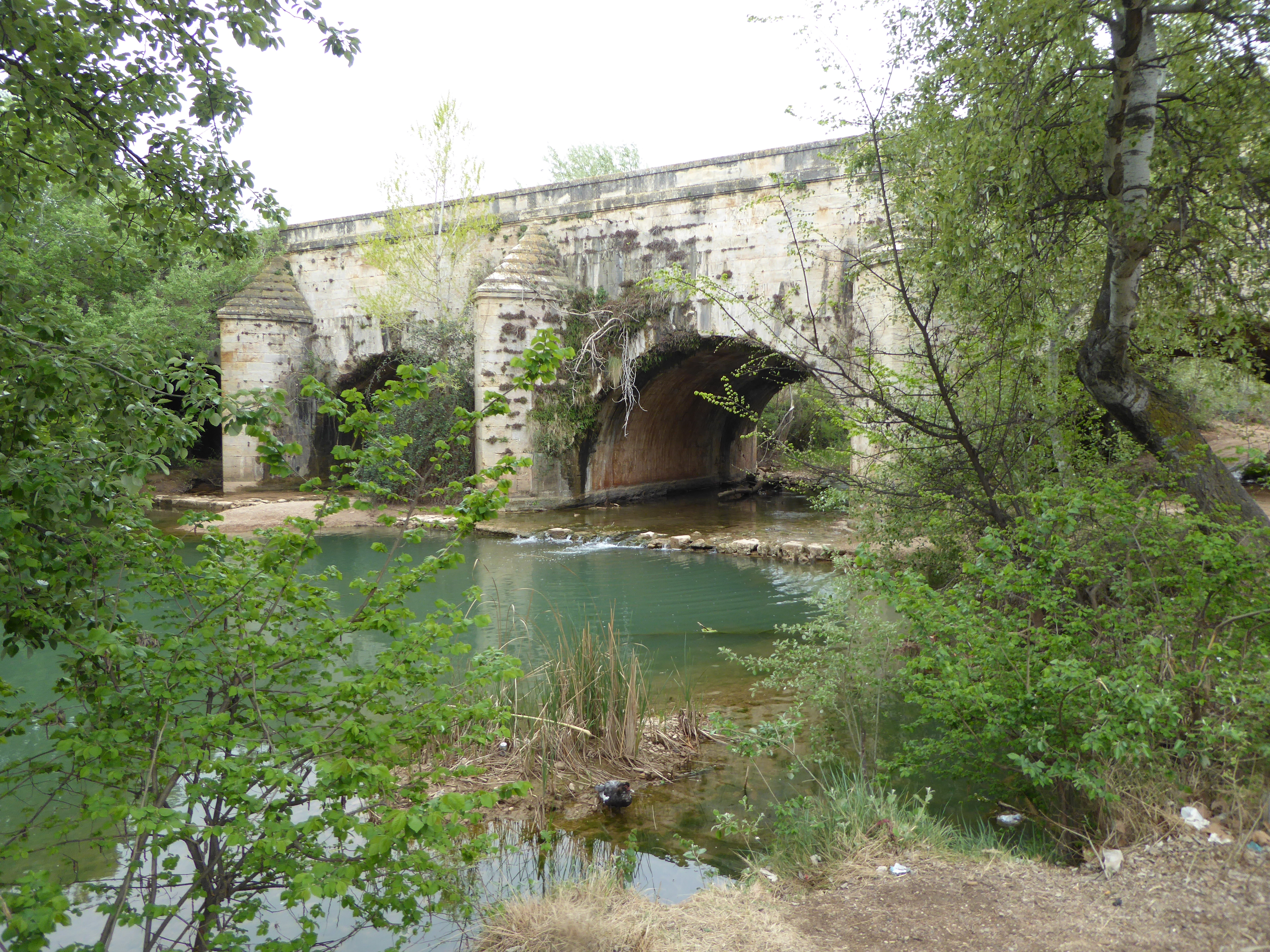
Acueducto del Jalón in Grisén

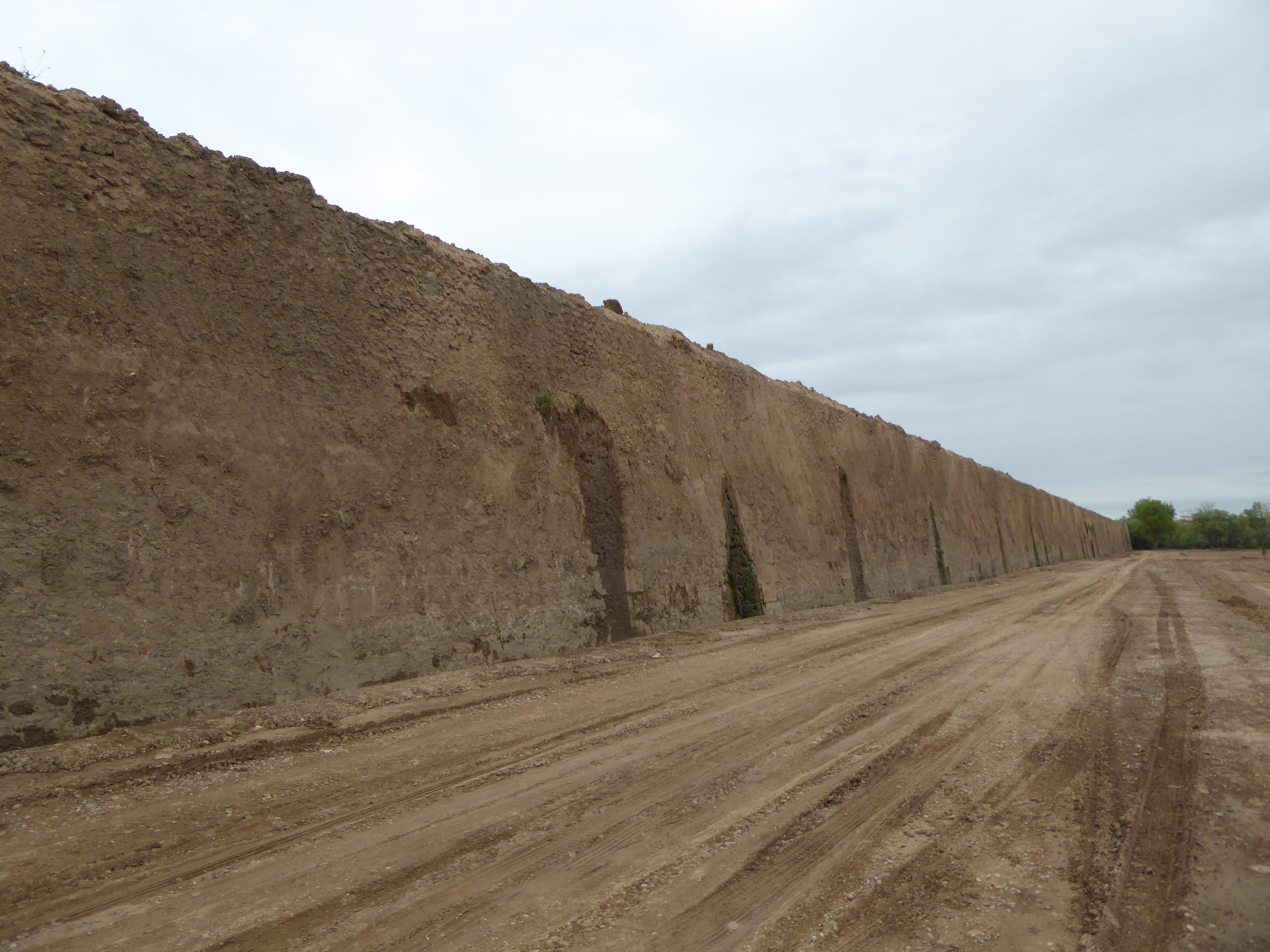
Grisén Walls

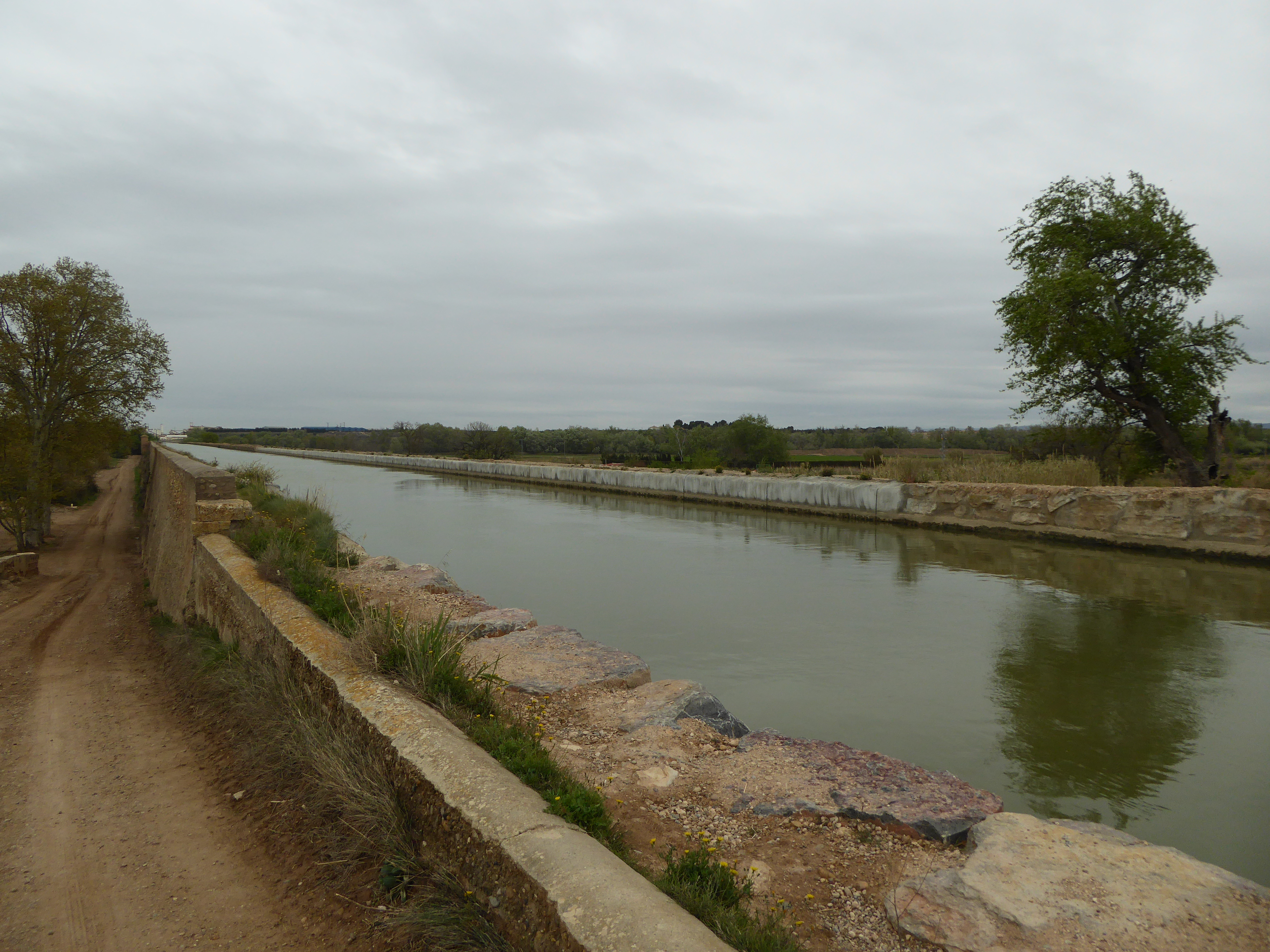
Canal in Grisén

== See also ==
- Canal de Isabel II
- Canal de Castilla
- Esclusas y molino de Casablanca
- Margaritifera auricularia

== Bibliography ==
- Cachau, Philippe (2015). Un Mansart au Pays Basque: le projet de canal Atlantique-Méditerranée de Jacques Hardouin-Mansart de Sagonne, dernier des Mansart (1767-1769) (in French). Bulletin de la Société des Sciences, Lettres et Arts de Bayonne. pp. 11–44.
- Palacios, J. (1833). Memoria histórica del Canal Imperial de Aragón (in Spanish). p. 22.
