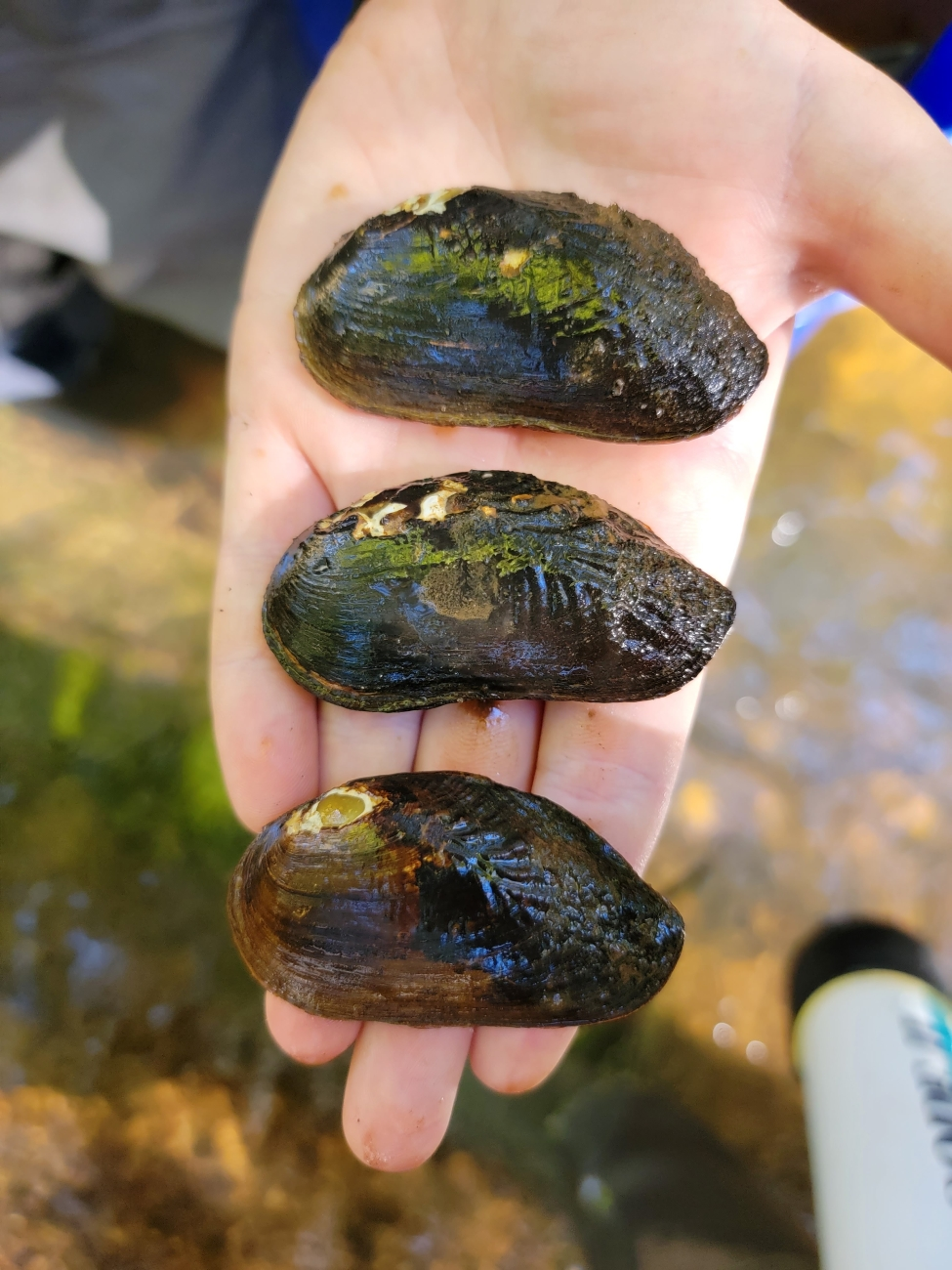

Conservation status
- Endangered (IUCN 3.1)

- Endangered (ESA)

Scientific classification
- Kingdom: Animalia
- Phylum: Mollusca
- Class: Bivalvia
- Order: Unionida
- Family: Margaritiferidae
- Genus: Margaritifera
- Species: M. marrianae

Binomial name
- Margaritifera marrianae R.I. Johnson, 1983

= Margaritifera marrianae =

Alabama pearlshell

Species of bivalve

Margaritifera marrianae, the Alabama pearlshell, is a species of freshwater mussel, an aquatic bivalve mollusk in the family Margaritiferidae, the freshwater pearl mussels.

This species is endemic to the United States. Its range is limited to the Alabama River and Conecuh/Escambia River drainages. It is threatened by habitat loss and declining water quality.

The Alabama pearlshell is a medium-size, oblong mussel that grows up to 3.8 inches (97 mm) in length. The shell is smooth and shiny and somewhat roughened along the posterior slope. The inside nacre is whitish or purplish and moderately iridescent.

In the past it was thought to be the same species as the Louisiana pearlshell (Margaritifera hembeli).
