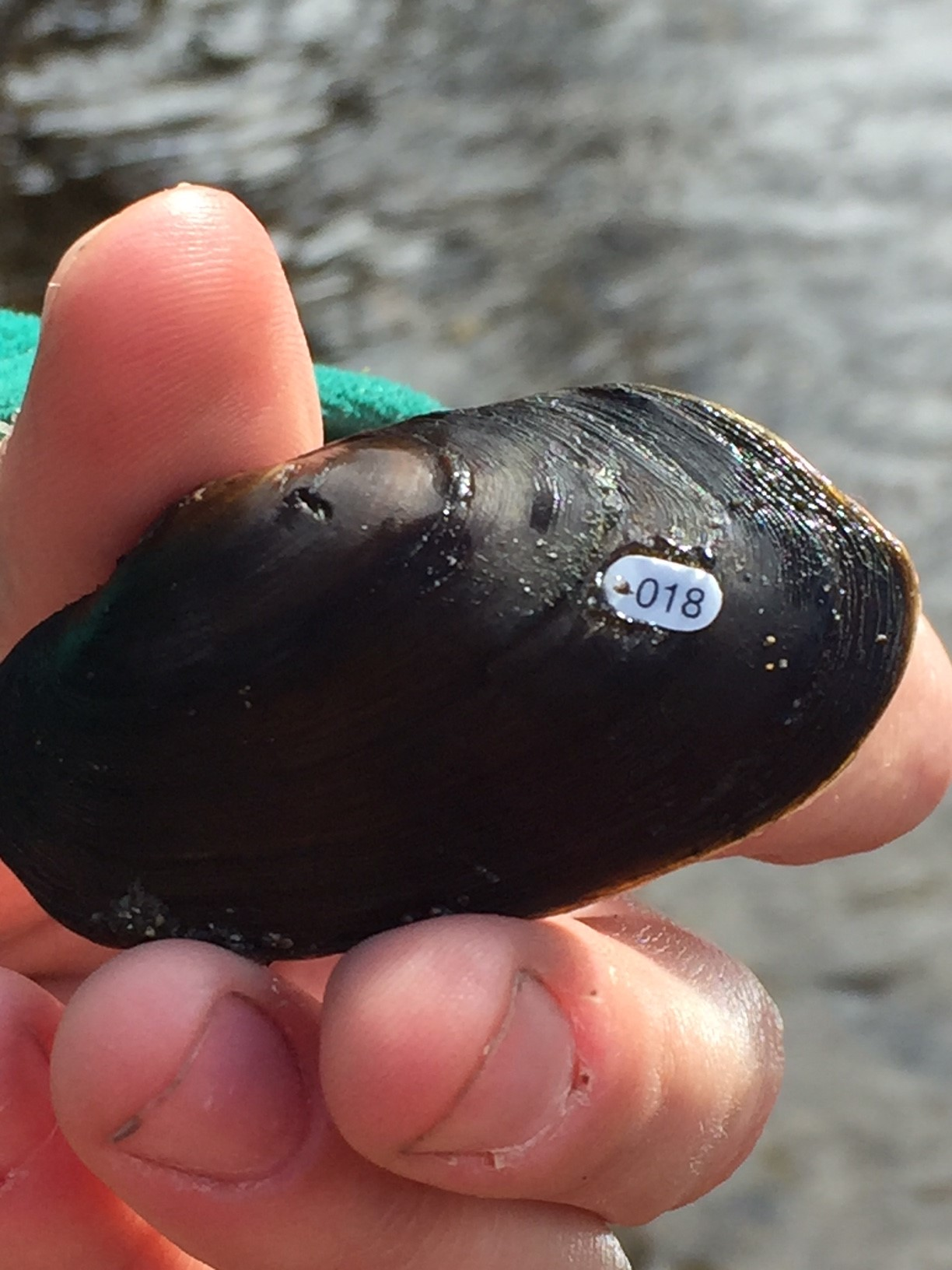
- Margaritifera falcata

Conservation status
- Near Threatened (IUCN 3.1)

- Vulnerable (NatureServe)

Scientific classification
- Kingdom: Animalia
- Phylum: Mollusca
- Class: Bivalvia
- Order: Unionida
- Family: Margaritiferidae
- Genus: Margaritifera
- Species: M. falcata

Binomial name
- Margaritifera falcata Gould, 1850

= Western pearlshell =

Species of bivalve

The western pearlshell (Margaritifera falcata) is a species of freshwater bivalve, a pearl mussel, a bivalve mollusk in the family Margaritiferidae. This species can be found only in the United States and Canada, where it occurs mostly west of the Rocky Mountains.

== Distribution ==
This species of pearl mussel is found in Pacific drainages from California north to British Columbia and southern Alaska. Some scientists consider a number of the coastal and large river populations of this species to be already extirpated, nearly extirpated, or declining rapidly. However, this species is still common throughout parts of the northern Rocky Mountains, although some populations in Montana may be declining.

The species is also found east of the Continental Divide in the headwaters of the Missouri River. Originally these populations were identified as the eastern species Margaritifera margaritifera, but recently scientists have confirmed that the populations are in fact M. falcata, which means that the species somehow was able to cross the divide. The most likely explanation for this distribution is headwater capture, where pre-glacial watersheds were cut and reconfigured by glacial advance or retreat. Westslope cutthroat trout are thought to have crossed the Continental Divide from the West into the headwaters of the present-day Missouri River during the Pleistocene glaciation, more that 20,000 years ago. Since cutthroat trout are an important host species for the glochidia larvae of M. falcata, it is likely that the mussels crossed the divide by hitching a ride on the trout.
