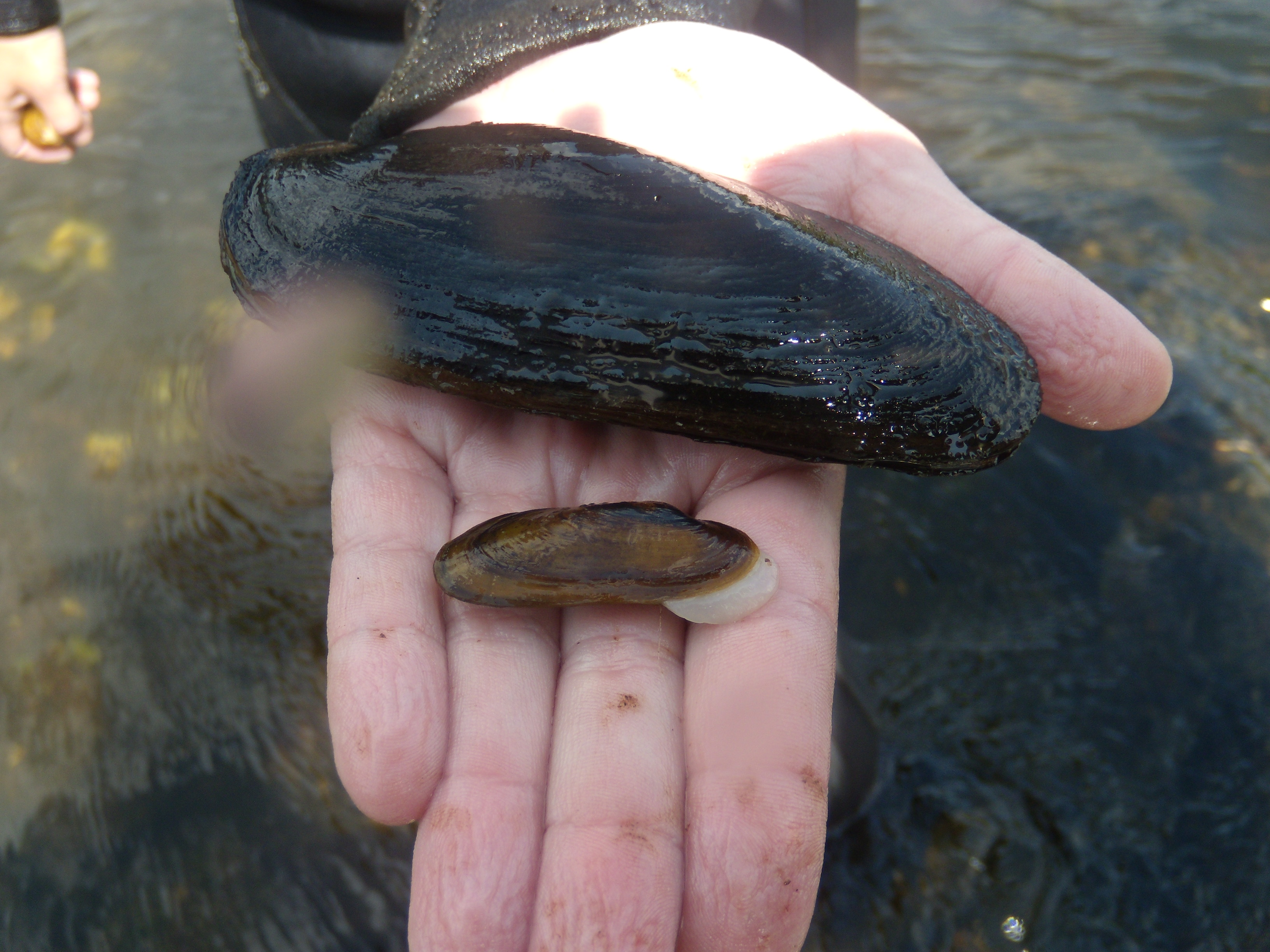
- Cumberlandia monodonta

Scientific classification
- Domain: Eukaryota
- Kingdom: Animalia
- Phylum: Mollusca
- Class: Bivalvia
- Order: Unionida
- Family: Margaritiferidae
- Genus: Cumberlandia; Ortmann, 1912

Species
- Cumberlandia monodonta; †Cumberlandia rhazensis; †Cumberlandia saharica

= Cumberlandia =

Cumberlandia Temporal range: Early Cretaceous to present

Genus of mussels

Cumberlandia is a genus of freshwater mussels, aquatic bivalve molluscs in the family Margaritiferidae, the freshwater pearl mussels.

The following single extant species is included in this genus:

- Cumberlandia monodonta (Say, 1829) — spectaclecase pearly mussel

In addition, two fossil species are also known from the Early Cretaceous Elrhaz Formation of Niger:

- †Cumberlandia rhazensis (Mongin, 1968)
- †Cumberlandia saharica (Mongin, 1968)

Both fossil species were previously classified in the genus Margaritifera, but were reclassified into Cumberlandia on the basis of their morphology in a 2018 revision of the family Margaritiferidae. This makes Cumberlandia a very ancient genus that was formerly more widespread. The common ancestor of Pseudunio and Cumberlandia is thought to have inhabited what is now the Mediterranean region during the Early Cretaceous, with some ancestral Cumberlandia dispersing south to Africa and others dispersing west to eastern North America, explaining their present and former distribution.
