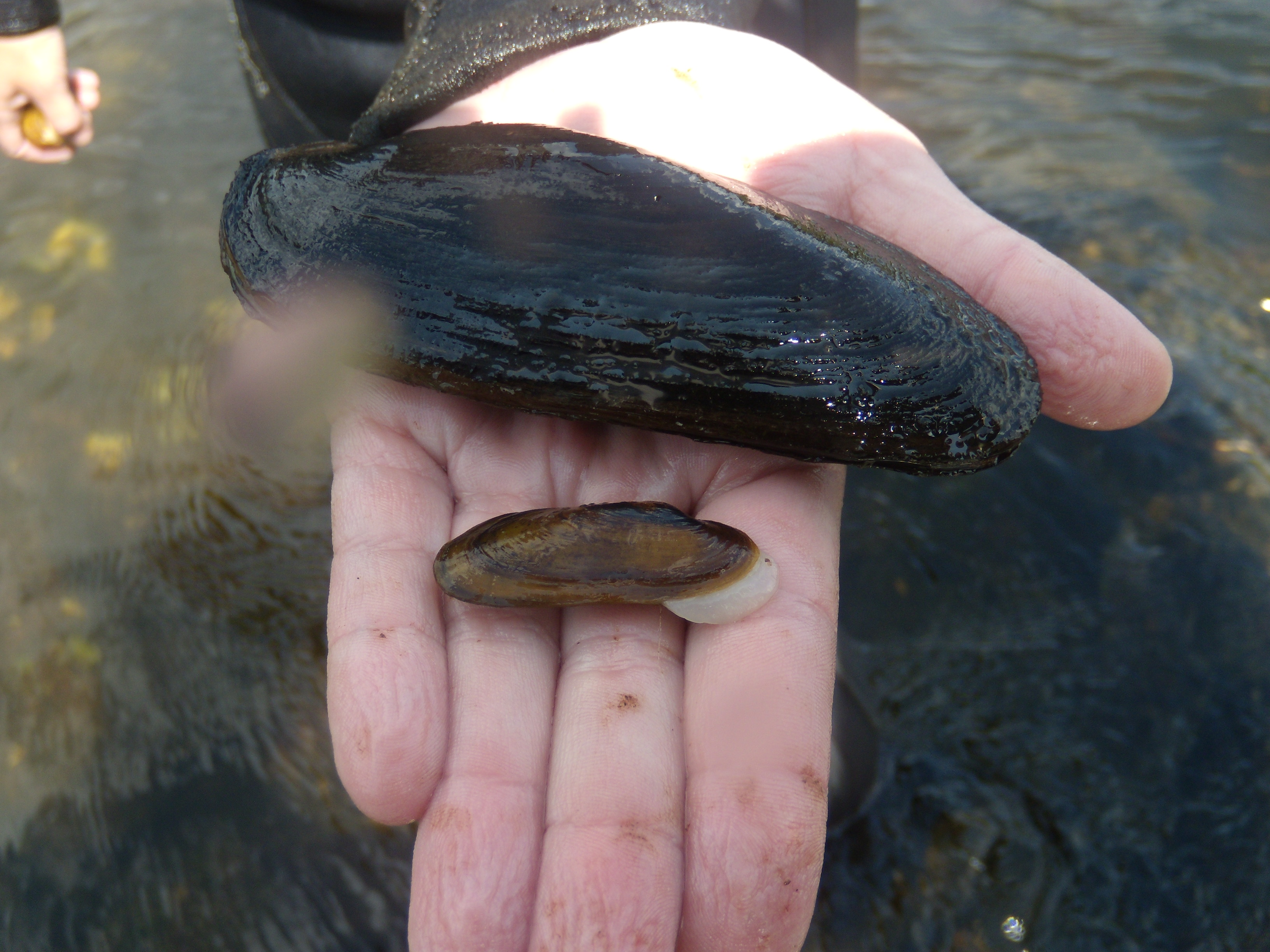
- Mature and young Cumberlandia monodonta

Conservation status
- Endangered (IUCN 3.1)

- Endangered (ESA)

Scientific classification
- Kingdom: Animalia
- Phylum: Mollusca
- Class: Bivalvia
- Order: Unionida
- Family: Margaritiferidae
- Genus: Cumberlandia
- Species: C. monodonta

Binomial name
- Cumberlandia monodonta (Say, 1829)

Synonyms
- Margaritifera monodonta Say, 1829

= Spectacle case pearly mussel =

Species of bivalve

Cumberlandia monodonta (common name spectaclecase) is a freshwater mussel endemic to the United States. Currently, C. monodonta is listed as an endangered species by the U.S. Fish and Wildlife Service and the International Union for Conservation of Nature.

Cumberlandia monodonta was first reported in a newspaper titled The Disseminator (New Harmony, Ind.) by Thomas Say in 1829 under the name Unio monodonta. The spectaclecase was then reclassified into the genus Cumberlandia by A. E. Ortmann in 1912.

Cumberlandia monodonta has experienced a drastic decline in population due to human activity, resulting in its listing as "Endangered" by the Endangered Species Act and the IUCN. In particular, the construction of dams has caused significant problems that disrupt C. monodonta's habitat and food supply. The Endangered Species Act classifies C. monodonta as a highly threatened (endangered) species with a low potential for recovery.

== Evolution ==
This is the only surviving member of the genus Cumberlandia, an ancient lineage of freshwater mussels with fossils known as far back as the Early Cretaceous (125 million years ago). Cumberlandia is also represented by two fossil species from North Africa; it is hypothesized that the ancestral Cumberlandia may have arose around what is now the Mediterranean region, and dispersed to eastern North America from there.

== Description ==
=== Physical characteristics ===
Cumberlandia monodonta have oblong shells that grow at least 9.25 inches (23.5 cm). The shell's texture is primarily smooth and will crack along the posterior end when dry. Younger C. monodonta shells appear a light yellowish-green but darken to a brown or black in older specimens.

=== Life history and reproduction ===
Specific life history requirements of C. monodonta's life cycle are still widely unknown. The mussel is estimated to reach sexual maturity at 4- to 5-years-old for males and 5- to 7-years-old for females. The life cycle of C. monodonta consists of many steps. Males release sperm into the water, and females intake the sperm while filter feeding. The fertilized eggs will grow into larvae called glochidia. When the glochidia mature in early April to late May, the females will release them into the water column. Glochidia have a brief but mandatory parasitic stage on fish—two host species have been confirmed (Hiodon tergisus and Hiodon alosoides), but further research is being conducted to identify additional hosts.

=== Diet ===
Adult C. monodonta will bury themselves under the river's substrate and filter feed, with a diet consisting of algae, bacteria, and dissolved organic material.

=== Population and range ===
Cumberlandia monodonta is endemic to the Mississippi, Ohio, and Missouri River basins and is found most often in larger rivers. They are most commonly found in aggregated clumps within mild water, between large rocks and wedged into firm mud. C. monodonta take shelter from the current by clustering beneath slab boulders or bedrock shelves.

Historically, C. monodonta has occurred in at least 44 streams within its three endemic basins. As of 2014, the mussel was known to occupy only 20 streams, representing a 55% decline in range. Furthermore, these populations are highly fragmented and cover only short stretches of a given river. The mussel's 5-Year Review reports that there has been no change in C. monodonta's range since its listing as Endangered. C. monodonta does not reside in any critical habitat. A map of C. monodonta's historical and present range can be found on its IUCN Red List web page.

== Human impacts ==
=== Habitat loss and degradation ===
Habitat loss and degradation has caused the decline of C. monodonta populations and continues to threaten the species today. Stressors include impoundments (such as dam building), channelization, chemical contaminants, mining, and sedimentation.

==== Impoundments and channelization ====
The effects of impoundments and channelization still pose an imminent threat to C. monodonta because they result in altered sedimentation patterns. Excess sedimentation has the potential to reduce the feeding and respiratory efficiency of the mussel.

==== Mining ====
In-stream and gravel mining negatively affect water quality. Coal, oil, and gas mining threaten C. monodonta by increasing siltation in streams, modifying hydrology patterns, and altering water quality. Furthermore, lead mining causes heavy metal leaching into sediments, which can be a vector for such chemical contaminants.

== Conservation concerns ==
=== Inadequacy of existing regulatory mechanisms ===
While point source discharges within C. monodonta's range have decreased due to the Clean Water Act, there is no information on the sensitivity of the mussel to various common industrial and municipal contaminants. Thus, a lack of adequate data and research prevents existing regulations, such as the Clean Water Act, from being used effectively.

=== Small isolated populations ===
The majority of remaining C. monodonta populations are small and geographically isolated. This leaves individual populations highly susceptible to eradication due to a single catastrophic event, such as a chemical contaminant spill. Furthermore, the re-propagation of this species into its historical range cannot occur due to its patchy distribution; without human intervention, its range will inevitably shrink as populations are extirpated. The exchange of genetic material between populations is also limited due to C. monodonta's distribution, which can result in inbreeding and decreased fitness in the species' offspring. A recent study found that this species has actually maintained high levels of genetic diversity due to gene flow in most populations, but that all populations have experienced some degree of fragmentation.

=== Exotic species ===
Zebra mussels are present in C. monodonta's current range and threaten all native mussels through direct fouling of their shells. Once attached to a live, native mussel shell, zebra mussels can impede locomotion (vertical and lateral), disrupt normal valve moments, deform valve margins, and deplete local food resources. C. monodonta could especially be susceptible to a zebra mussel infestation due to the spectaclecase's affinity to aggregate in clumps; a single zebra mussel attachment event has the potential to wipe out an entire C. monodonta population.

=== Temperature and climate change ===
Cumberlandia monodonta will have trouble adjusting its range in response to climate change due to the fragmentation of freshwater drainage systems and their lack of overall flexibility as a sessile creature. A study investigated the effects of climate change on population connectivity of C. monodonta. Modeled under two predicted climate scenarios (RCP2.6 and RCP8.5), scientists found that the genetic diversity and population connectivity would be significantly reduced because of the loss of suitable habitat.

== Conservation status ==
=== Conservation status listing history ===
Cumberlandia monodonta was first included in the "Review of Invertebrate Wildlife for Listing as Endangered for Threatened Species" in 1984. This list does not officially recognize species as endangered, threatened, or otherwise, but encourages species on the list to be more thoroughly researched in order to designate an Endangered Species Act listing.

The IUCN listed Cumberlandia monodonta (under its synonym Margaritifera monodonta) as "Near Threatened" in 1996 and updated its status to "Endangered" in 2012. On March 13, 2012, The United States Fish and Wildlife Services officially declared the species as endangered due to its declining populations. A recovery outline was developed for C. monodonta in January 2014, but a full recovery plan has not yet been developed. Since the species was declared endangered by the Endangered Species Act, there have been no changes in its listing status.

=== Current conservation efforts ===
==== Recovery plan and recovery priority ====
There is not a finalized recovery plan for C. monodonta, only a recovery outline. C. monodonta is listed as a 4 on the Endangered Species Act's recovery priority scale, indicating that the species faces severe threat in a monotypic genus but has a low recovery potential. However, Williams et al. 2017 proposes the reclassification of C. monodonta under the species Margaritifera. If this change were to occur, its recovery priority number would be changed to 5 to reflect its status as one of several species in a genus rather than a monotypic genus. Its potential for recovery, however, remains low.

==== Inventory and monitoring ====
The states of Alabama, Arkansas, Illinois, Iowa, Kentucky, Minnesota, Missouri, Tennessee, West Virginia, Wisconsin and Virginia have had or are currently monitoring the populations of various freshwater mussels through site-specific surveys.

==== Host research ====
When C. monodonta was originally listed, no species were known as a host species for its glochidia stage. Now, two host species are known (see: Life history and reproduction), and further research is being conducted to identify further host species.

==== Genetic research ====
Various genetic research has been conducted to determine population viability of current and theoretical augmented populations. Further research would contribute to greater understanding of how to properly manage and restore populations of C. monodonta throughout its range.

==== Habitat restoration and protection ====
Many parcels of public land (eg. state parks, state forests, wildlife management areas) encapsulate the historical and current range of C. monodonta. The Nature Conservancy (TNC) has created bio-reserves along two stream systems that contain populations of C. monodonta in Tennessee, Virginia, and Kentucky. Within these reserves, TNC has implemented many community-based projects that address aquatic species and their habitat conservation. Various State public lands and wildlife refuges span portions of C. monodonta's range, safeguarding the populations from further habitat degradation. A few Federal programs, such as the Wildlife Habitat Incentives Program and the Environmental Quality Incentive Program, emphasize stream habitat restoration and are being executed by Federal agency partners (eg., NRCS-WV).

==== Stream population summary table ====
A table was made summarizing the current status of the 20 known C. monodonta populations. The status listing is based on population trends since 1997, the current size of a population (small, medium large, extra large), and any evidence of recruitment. Status criterion can be found on page 6 of C. monodonta's 5-year-review. As of 2017-2018, there are 5 "stronghold", 5 "weakened", and 15 "unknown" C. monodonta populations. Keeping track of this data is important for scientists and others involved in C. monodonta conservation, because understanding historical and current population sizes can help them predict future changes.

==== Laboratory successes ====
The first successful in-vitro growth of several hundred individuals of C. monodonta occurred in 2018. The transplant of lab-grown C. monodonta into larger populations is a potential recovery tool for the species. Furthermore, qPCR markers have been developed to identify types of mussel larvae found on wild caught fish. These can be used to identify additional populations of C. monodonta.
