= Nore pearl mussel =

Conservation status
- Critically Endangered (IUCN 3.1)

Scientific classification
- Kingdom: Animalia
- Phylum: Mollusca
- Class: Bivalvia
- Order: Unionida
- Family: Margaritiferidae
- Genus: Margaritifera
- Species: M. durrovensis

Binomial name
- Margaritifera durrovensis (Phillips, 1928)

Species of mollusc

The Nore pearl mussel (Margaritifera durrovensis) is a critically endangered species of freshwater pearl mussel, an aquatic bivalve mollusc in the family Margaritiferidae.

The species is endemic to Ireland and was first identified by R.A. Phillips in 1926, who later declared it a new species in Volume 18 of the Proceedings of the Malacological Society. This designation was controversial, and the taxonomic status of the Nore pearl mussel remains inconclusive. It is often described as a rare ecophenotype of M. margaritifera. The European Union's Habitats Directive on the conservation of natural habitats and wild fauna placed Margaritifera durrovensis on Annex II and Annex V as a separate taxon.

== Distribution ==
The species is native to the Three Sisters - the rivers Barrow, Suir and Nore, the latter of which being the mussel's namesake. However, specimens have not been found outside of the River Nore since 1993. Unlike M. margaritifera, which can tolerate acidic conditions, the Nore pearl mussel requires highly calcareous waters, and generally inhabits sections of the River Nore which have CaCO_{3} concentrations of over 330 mg/L. The Nore pearl mussel also has a significantly shorter lifespan than M. margaritifera, typically living for 60 to 80 years.

== Threats and conservation ==
Studies conducted on Nore pearl mussel distribution revealed that the population of the species had declined by approximately 75% between 1991 and 2009. The primary pressure identified was agricultural intensification leading to elevated levels of phosphorus, nitrate and suspended solids across the mussel's native range. A captive breeding program was set up in 2005 by the National Parks and Wildlife Service, whereby juvenile mussels complete their first growing season in captivity before being re-introduced to the River Nore.
