= Zyuganov (surname) =

Zyuganov (Russian: Зюга́нов) is a Russian surname. Notable people with the surname include:

- Gennady Zyuganov (born 1944), Russian politician
- Valeriy Zyuganov (born 1955), Soviet and Russian biologist
- Leonid Zyuganov (born 1988), Russian politician
