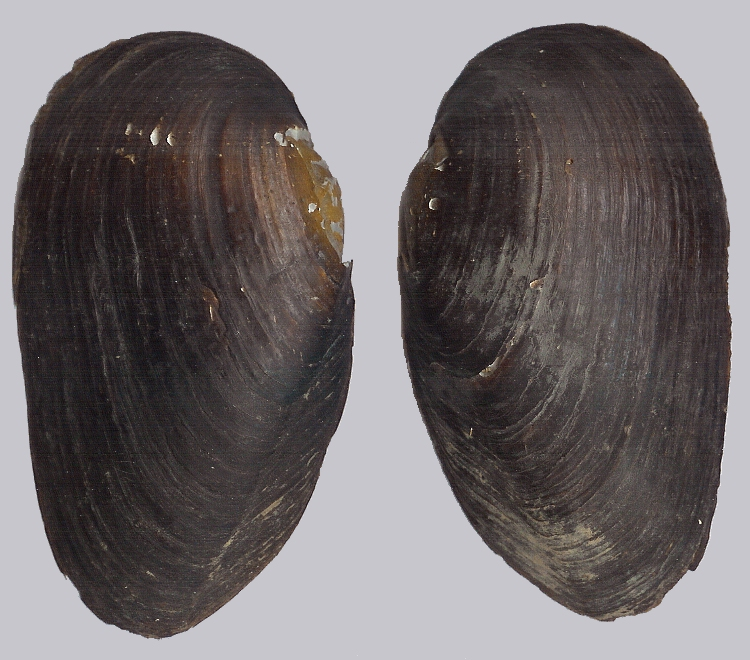
- Margaritifera margaritifera

Scientific classification
- Domain: Eukaryota
- Kingdom: Animalia
- Phylum: Mollusca
- Class: Bivalvia
- Order: Unionida
- Superfamily: Unionoidea
- Family: Margaritiferidae
- Genus: Margaritifera; Schumacher, 1816

Type species
- Margaritifera fluviatilis Schumacher, 1815

Synonyms
- Dahurinaia Starobogatov, 1970; † Hungaramblema Starobogatov, 1970 (junior subjective synonym); Margarita (Margaritana); Margaritana Schumacher, 1817 (objective synonym); Margaritana (Margaritiferana) Fagot, 1893; Margaritifera (Margaritanopsis) F. Haas, 1910; Margaritifera (Margaritifera) Schumacher, 1815; Margartifera Schumacher, 1815 (incorrect original spelling); Margatifera (incorrect subsequent spelling); † Plicatibaphia Starobogatov, 1970; † Pseudomargaritifera Q.-H. Ma, 1996 (junior subjective synonym); Schalienaia Starobogatov, 1970; † Solenoides Q.-H. Ma, 1996 (junior subjective synonym)

= Margaritifera =

Margaritifera Temporal range: Middle Cretaceous to present 110–0 Ma

Genus of bivalves

Margaritifera is a genus of freshwater mussels, aquatic bivalve molluscs in the family Margaritiferidae, the freshwater pearl mussels.

== Species ==
Species within the genus Margaritifera include:

- Margaritifera auricularia or Pseudunio auricularia
- Margaritifera falcata (Gould, 1850)
- Margaritifera hembeli (Conrad, 1838)
- Margaritifera margaritifera (Linnaeus, 1758) — Freshwater pearl mussel (includes Margaritifera margaritifera durrovensis Phillips, 1928)
- Margaritifera marrianae R. I. Johnson, 1983

The following fossil species are known from the mid-Cretaceous of Mongolia, being formerly classified in the genus Unio:

- †Margaritifera elongata (Martinson, 1982)
- †Margaritifera sainshandensis (Martinson, 1982)
- †Margaritifera glabra (Kolesnikov, 1956)

== References) ==
- Starobogatov, Y. I. (1970). Fauna Molliuskov i Zoogeograficheskoe Raionirovanie Kontinental'nykh Vodoemov Zemnogo Shara [The Molluscan Fauna and Zoogeographical Zoning of the Continental Water Bodies of the World]. Nauka. Leningrad. 372 p., 12 tables.
- Ma, Q.-H. (1996). Revision of Mesozoic Margaritiferidae in China and their development. Acta Palaeontologica Sinica. 35(4): 408-429.
