= Lorenz Spengler =

Danish turner and naturalist

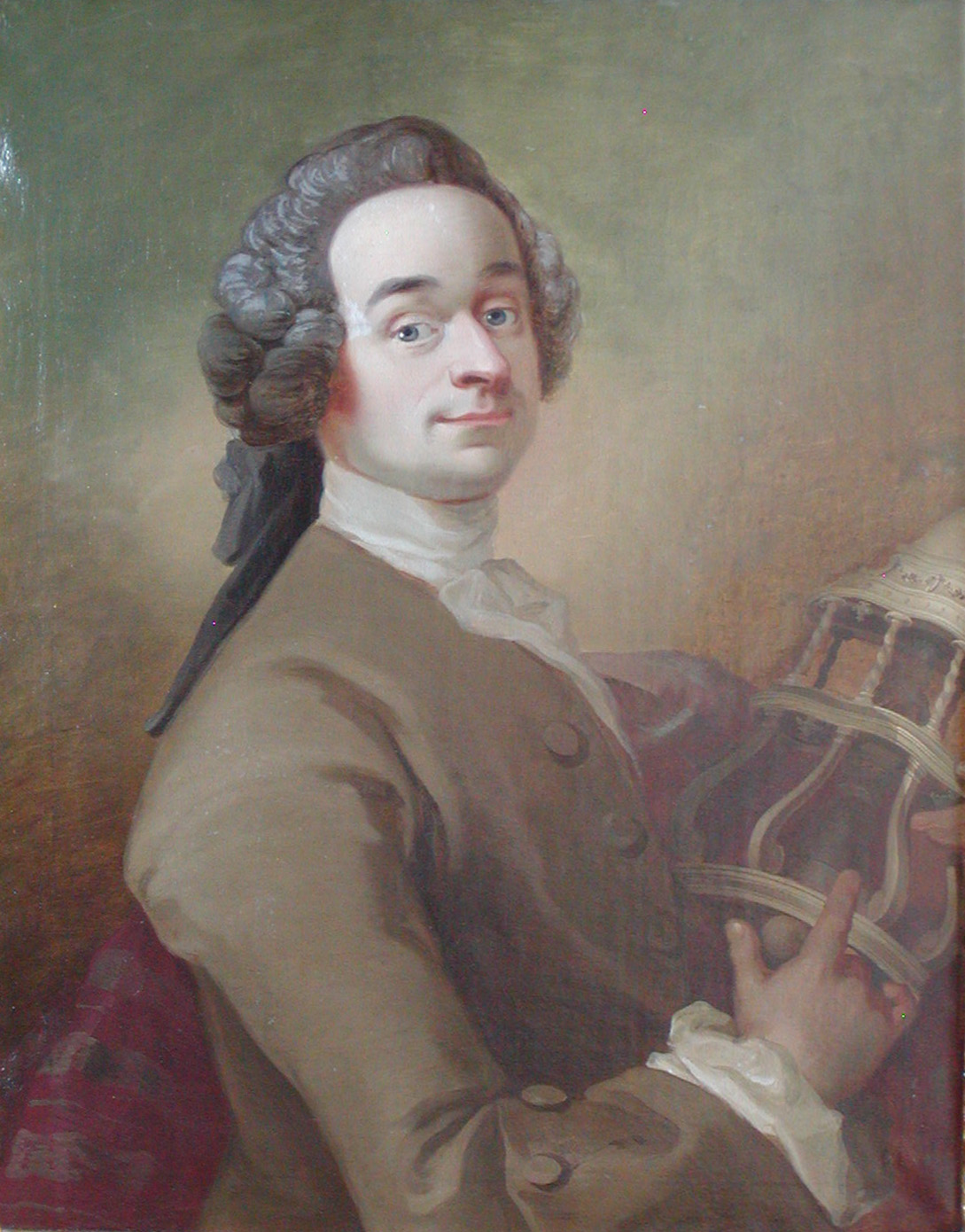
Lorenz Spengler in 1751 by Carl Gustaf Pilo.

Lorenz Spengler (22 September 1720 – 20 December 1807) was a Danish turner and naturalist. He served as director of the Royal Danish Cabinet of Art and Curiosities from 1771 to 1807.

== Early life ==
Spengler was born in Schaffhausen, Switzerland, the son of master builder Johann Conrad Spengler (1676–1748) and Maria Peter (c. 1683–1723).

== Career ==
He arrived at Copenhagen in 1743 and became a tutor to Christian VI of Denmark and later Frederick V of Denmark in the art of turning. From 1771 he was head of the Royal Art Chamber (Det Kongelige Kunstkammer), a position he held until his death in 1807. Among his works is "Beskrivelse og Oplysning over den hindindtil lidet udarbeidede Sloegt af mangeskallede Konchylier som Linnaeus har kaldet Lepas med tilfoiede nye og ubeskrevne Arter ", a treatise on shelled molluscs including many new species descriptions, of which six taxa are still valid. Spengler maintained a personal natural history collection, the Museo Spengleriano.

Spengler is commemorated in the scientific name of a species of Southeast Asian turtle, Geoemyda spengleri. He is also celebrated in the common name of the Spengler's freshwater mussel, Margaritifera auricularia.

== Personal life ==
On 30 July 1756, in the German Reformed Church, in Copenhagen, Spengler was wed to Gertrud Sabina Trott (1739-1789). She was the daughter of customs official Johan Caspar Trott (1701–61) and Bernhardine Munzinger (ca. 1708–74). Her father was from Saxony and her mother was from Basel.

His son Johan Conrad Spengler succeeded him as director of the Royal Danish Cabinet of Art and Curiosities in 1807. The daughter Bernhardine Frölich (Spengler) (1758-1813) wasmarried to the merchant Johan Jacob Frölich (1746-1801). Rge daughter Juliane Marie Spengler (1765-1799) was married to minister of the German Reformed congregation in Copenhagen Ferdinand Louis Mourier (1754-1831).
