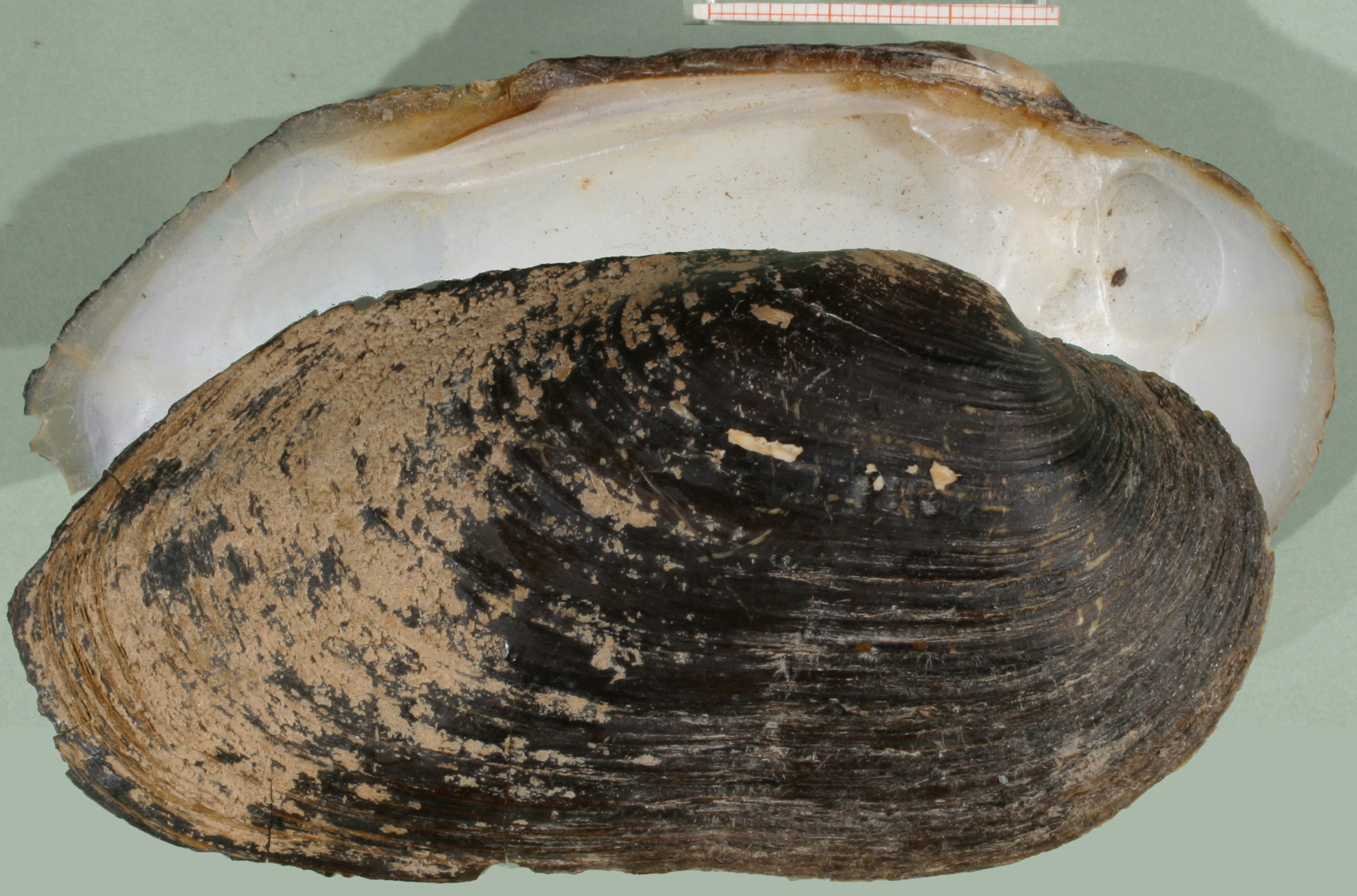
- A shell of Spengler's freshwater mussel collected by Fritz Haas in Spain

Conservation status
- Critically Endangered (IUCN 3.1)

Scientific classification
- Kingdom: Animalia
- Phylum: Mollusca
- Class: Bivalvia
- Order: Unionida
- Family: Margaritiferidae
- Genus: Margaritifera
- Species: M. auricularia

Binomial name
- Margaritifera auricularia (Spengler, 1793)
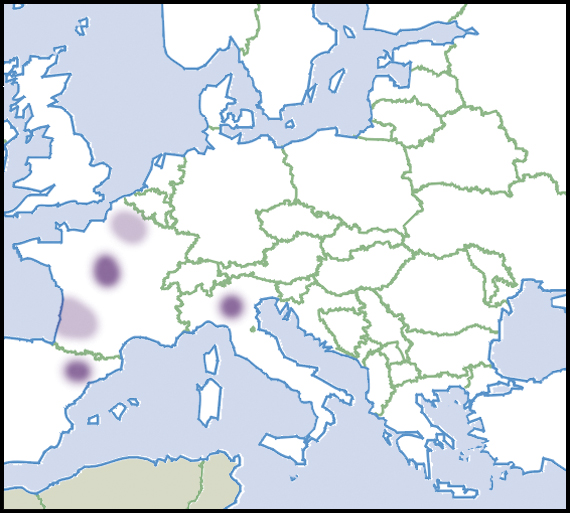

Synonyms
- Unio auricularius Spengler, 1793; Pseudunio auricularia (Spengler, 1793); Pseudunio auricularius auricularius (Spengler, 1793); Unio sinuata Lamarck, 1819

= Margaritifera auricularia =

Spengler's freshwater mussel

Species of bivalve

Margaritifera auricularia is a species of European freshwater mussel, an aquatic bivalve mollusk in the family Margaritiferidae, the freshwater pearl mussels. Formerly found throughout western and central Europe, the species is now critically endangered and is one of the rarest invertebrates worldwide, being confined to a few rivers in Spain and France. M. auricularia is commonly known as Spengler's freshwater mussel in honour of Lorenz Spengler, who first described this species.

== Description ==
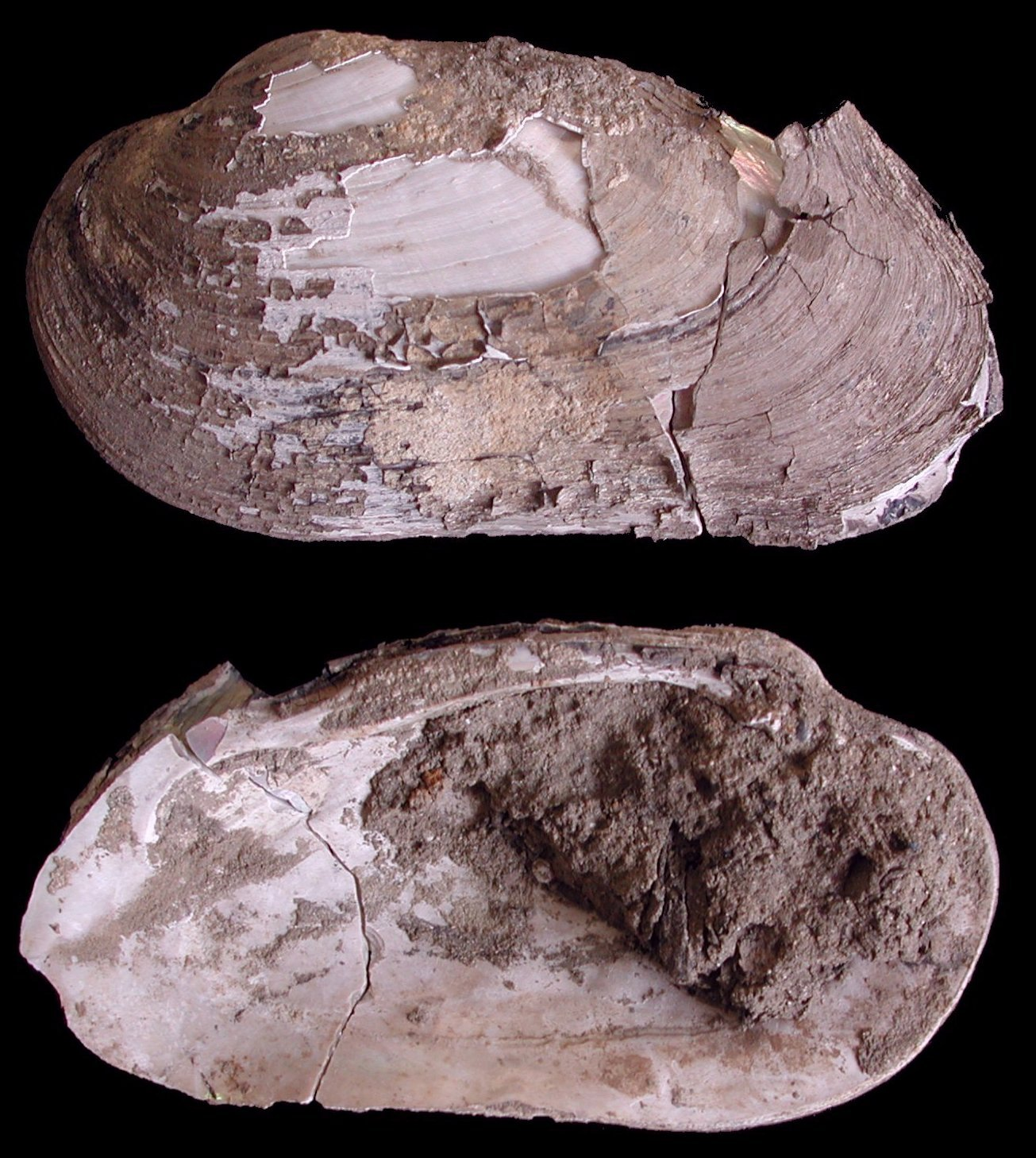
Spengler's freshwater mussel, a subfossil valve from the Holocene Scheldt deposits, in Belgium

Large shells are up to 180 mm in length.

== Taxonomy ==
There are different opinions on the taxonomy of this species.

The species was originally described as Unio auricularius Spengler, 1793.

When it is placed in the genus Margaritifera Schumacher, 1816, it is considered to be:

- Margaritifera auricularia (Spengler, 1793)

At other times it is placed in the genus Pseudunio F. Haas, 1910, in which case it is known as:

- Pseudunio auricularia (Spengler, 1793)

Sometimes it is given the masculine gender:

- Pseudunio auricularius auricularius (Spengler, 1793)

== Distribution ==
It is found in:

- France – recent distribution
- Italy – recent
- Spain – recent
- Portugal – recent(?) or fossil(?)
- maybe in some rivers in north Africa: Morocco
- Germany – locally extinct from upper Rhine after 1500
- Netherlands – extinct or fossil
- Belgium – extinct or fossil
- Luxembourg – extinct or fossil
- Czech Republic – only fossil records in layers with settlement from neolite: Ďáblice, Kobylisy, Roztoky, Podbaba.
- United Kingdom – ?

== Ecology ==
The fish hosts for the glochidium larvae of this species are: Salaria fluviatilis, Gambusia holbrooki, Acipenser baerii, Acipenser naccarii and Acipenser sturio.

The hosts for this species were unknown for a long time: as recently as 1998 they were still not known.

== See also ==
- Margaritifera laevis
- Esclusas y molino de Casablanca
