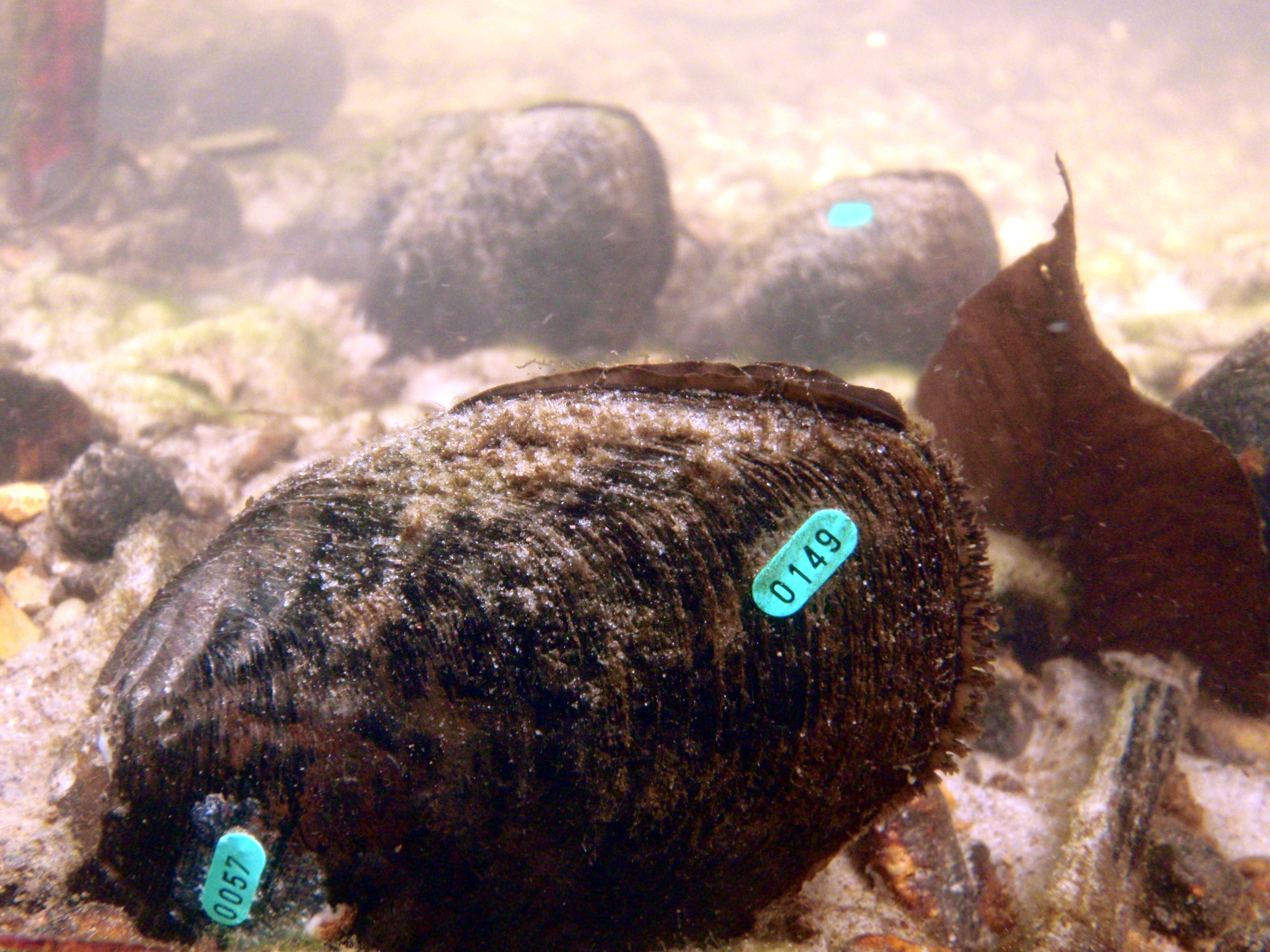

Conservation status
- Critically Endangered (IUCN 3.1)

- Threatened (ESA)

Scientific classification
- Kingdom: Animalia
- Phylum: Mollusca
- Class: Bivalvia
- Order: Unionida
- Family: Margaritiferidae
- Genus: Margaritifera
- Species: M. hembeli

Binomial name
- Margaritifera hembeli (Conrad, 1838)

Synonyms
- Unio hembeli Conrad, 1838

= Louisiana pearlshell =

Species of bivalve

The Louisiana pearlshell, Margaritifera hembeli, is a rare species of bivalve mollusk in the family Margaritiferidae. This freshwater mussel is native to Louisiana in the United States, and was previously present also in Arkansas. It grows to a length of about 10 cm (4 in) and lives on the sand or gravel stream-bed in riffles and fast flowing stretches of small streams. Its life cycle involves a stage where it lives parasitically inside a fish. This mollusk is sensitive to increased sedimentation and cannot tolerate impoundments. Because of its limited range and its population decline, the International Union for Conservation of Nature has rated this mollusk as being critically endangered.

== Description ==
This mussel reaches about 10 centimetres (3.9 in) long by 5 centimetres (2.0 in) wide and 3 centimetres (1.2 in) high. It is dark brown or black in color with a white nacre.

== Ecology ==
This mussel lives in small, shallow creeks with sandy or gravel bottoms. They are found more often in riffles and areas with faster currents than in stagnant pools. The water is clear and the substrate is stable.

Like other freshwater mussels, this species releases its larvae, termed glochidia, into the water where they enter the bodies of fish as parasites to develop into juvenile mussels. Host fish species for this mussel include striped shiner (Luxilus chrysocephalus), redfin shiner (Lythrurus umbratilis), golden shiner (Notemigonus crysoleucas), and brown madtom (Noturus phaeus).

== Status ==
When it was first placed on the Endangered Species List in 1988 the mussel was thought to remain only in the Bayou Boeuf river system in Rapides Parish, Louisiana. It was found in eleven streams with 90% of the total population found in four of the streams. The mussel was downlisted to threatened status in 1993 when more populations were discovered. It was found to inhabit eight streams in the Red River drainage in Grant Parish, Louisiana.

It also once occurred in Arkansas, but it has been extirpated from all the waterways there. It is a federally listed threatened species of the United States. This species is threatened by the loss and degradation of its habitat. These habitat changes are caused by impoundments of the waterways, including the effects of beaver dams. Some areas, including streams in the Kisatchie National Forest, undergo increased sedimentation from nearby silviculture, road maintenance, and livestock grazing. Gravel mining may also cause increased sediment. Genetic analysis reveals the species has low genetic variability, which makes it more vulnerable to changes in its environment. Because it is restricted to only two river drainages in central Louisiana, and declined by over 80% during the last few decades, the International Union for Conservation of Nature has rated this mollusk as being critically endangered.
