= Valeriy Zyuganov =

Russian biologist (1955–2021)

Valeriy Valeryevich Zyuganov
- Born: 31 July 1955; Yangiyo‘l (Uzbekistan)
- Died: 15 August 2021; Moscow (Russia)
- Citizenship: Russia
- Education: Moscow State University (1977)
- Known for: Discovered the fact of negligible senescence in the freshwater pearl mussel (scientific name Margaritifera margaritifera); author of the hypothesis: - "parasite-gooder, which prolongs the life-span of host"
- Scientific career
- Fields: Biogerontology, biology, hydrobiology, malacology
- Institutions: Koltzov institute of developmental biology of Russian Academy of Sciences
- Doctoral advisor: prof. V.V. Khlebovich

Notes
- website: http://www.arctic-plus.com

Valeriy Valeryevich Zyuganov (Russian: Зюганов Валерий Валерьевич, born 31 July 1955 in Yangiyo‘l city, Uzbekistan) is a Soviet and Russian biologist, (zoologist) and Doctor of Biological Sciences. He is the pupil and follower of professors V.V. Khlebovich,the Zoological Institute of the Russian Academy of Sciences and Yu. A. Labas.A.N. Severtsov Institute of Ecology and Evolution of the Russian Academy of Sciences

== Career ==
Valeriy Zyuganov graduated from the Faculty of Biology, Moscow State University in 1977.

Since 1977 Valeriy Zyuganov has been a researcher (graduate employee) at the Koltzov institute of developmental biology of Russian Academy of Sciences in (Moscow).

Since 1980, he has been a candidate of biological sciences. At Moscow State University, he presented a thesis on the topic: - "Mechanisms of formation of complex of Gasterosteus aculeatus sensu lato". After presenting his doctoral dissertation, he was appointed a junior researcher in the Koltzov institute of developmental biology of Russian Academy of Sciences in Moscow.

Since 1985, he has been a research fellow in the Koltzov institute of developmental biology of Russian Academy of Sciences in Moscow.

In 1989 he received the commission of chief scientific worker.

In 1994, Valeriy Zyuganov became a Doctor of Biological Sciences. At the St. Petersburg State University in Saint Petersburg, his doctoral thesis and scientific paper are on the specialty 03.00.10 — ichthyology on the theme: - "The family of stickleback (Gasterosteidae) in the world's fauna."

Since 2005, Valery Zyuganov is the head of the group of ecology and biological systems evolution in the Koltzov institute of developmental biology of Russian Academy of Sciences in Moscow.

== Scientific achievements ==
In the late 1980s and early 1990s, V.V. Zyuganov formulated the concept of freshwater pearl mussel–—Atlantic salmon symbiosis.

In the 1990s, V.V. Zyuganov and colleagues developed a number of biotechnologies for breeding rare and endangered species of freshwater mussels of a genus of Margaritifera, which are included in the IUCN Red List of the USSR. These inventions are protected inventor's certificates.

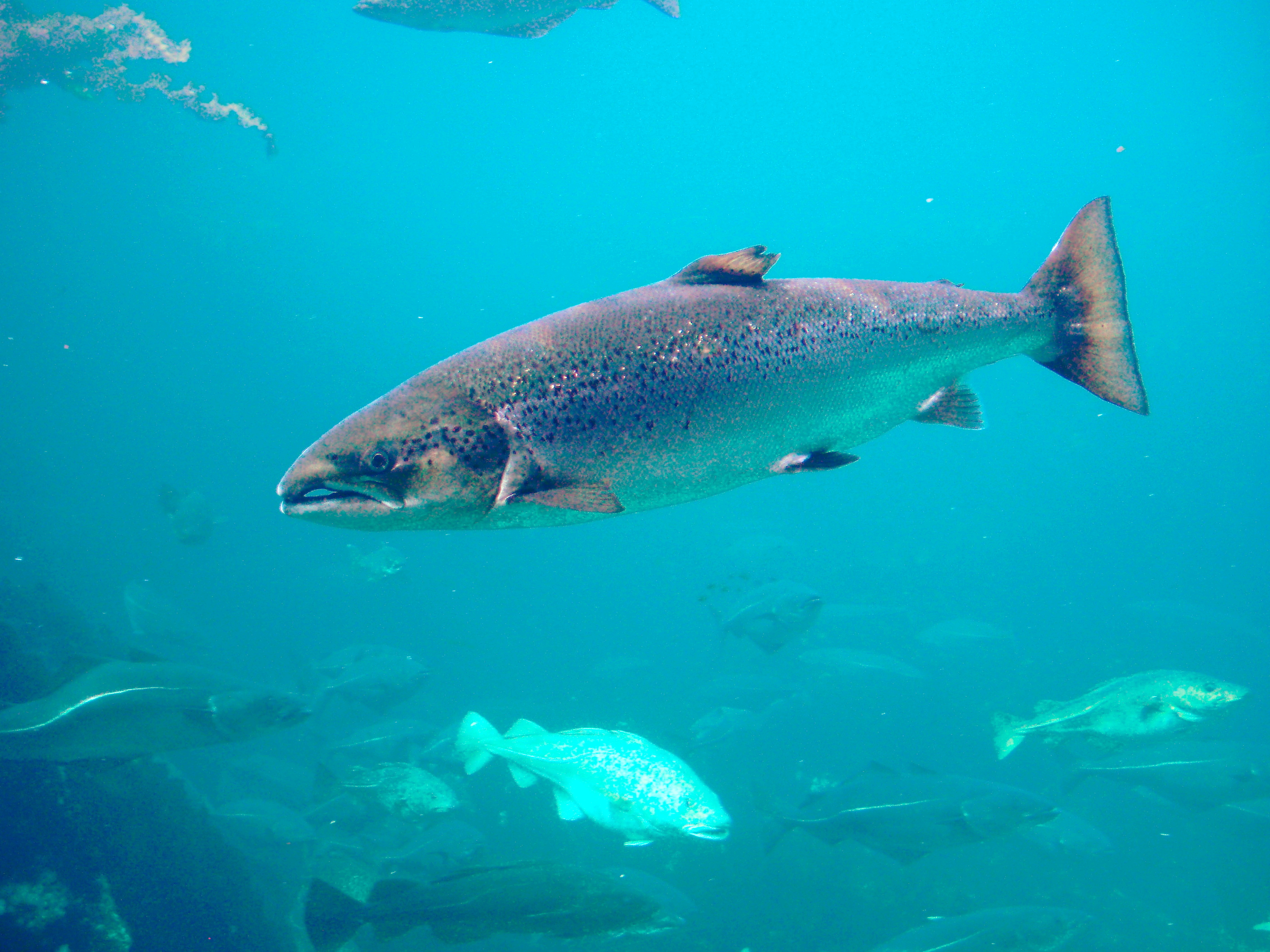
Atlantic Salmon

In the 1990s, V.V. Zyuganov, in the framework of the concept: - a freshwater pearl mussel - Atlantic salmon symbiosis, put forward the parasite-gooder hypothesis, which prolongs the life-span of the host. This hypothesis is supported by a number of known researchers. The debate has moved beyond the scientific community of Russia. The Zyuganov hypothesis was discussed at international conferences and was cited in scholarly journals and monographs of known researchers. The tone of the debate was relented after having been discovered similar facts of a life extension of a host by means of parasite in pairs: - parasitic worms - fish and crustacean - fish. For the Zyuganov hypothesis were appeared credible proponents and opponents

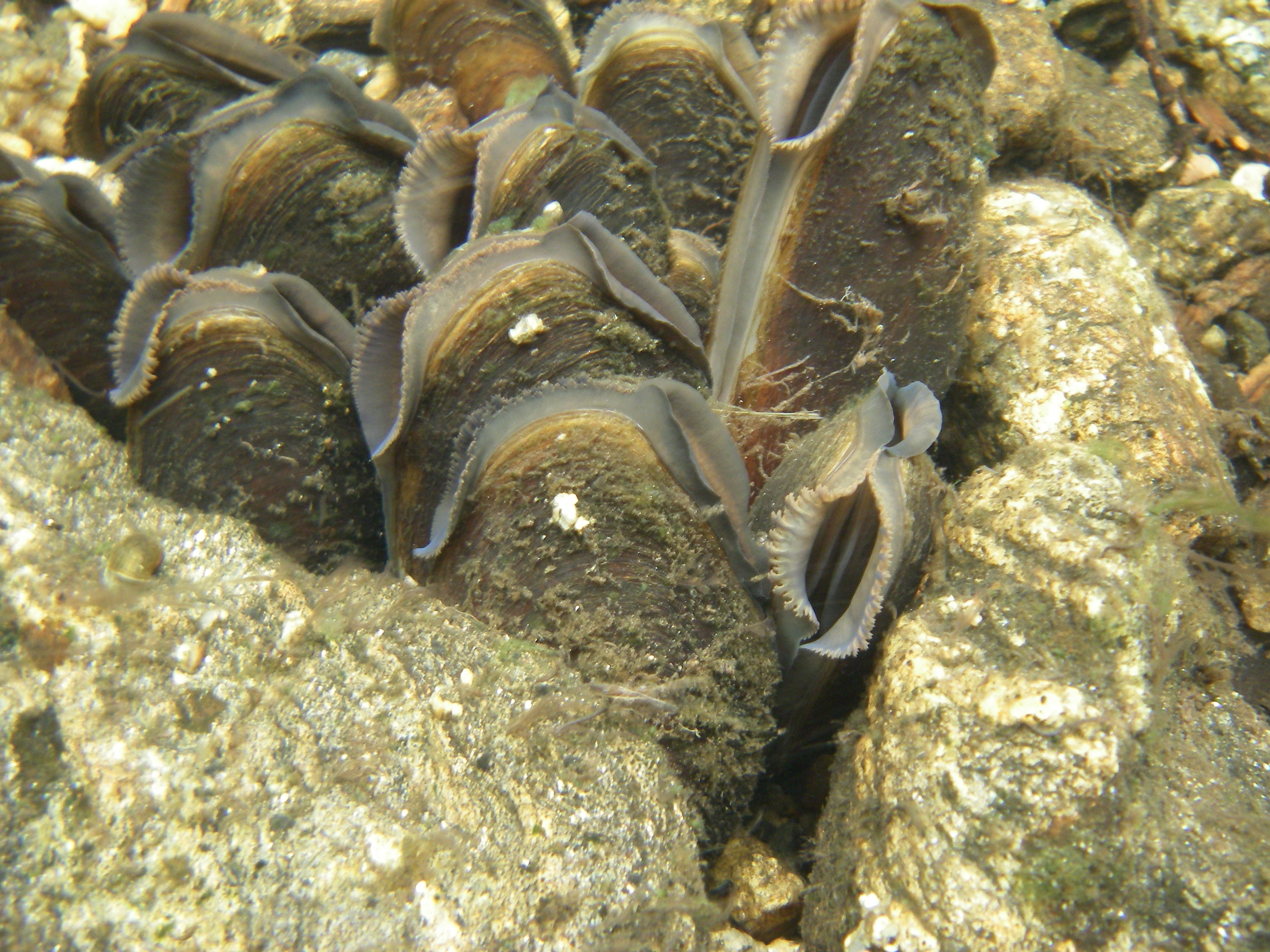
Group of live Margaritifera margaritifera in a river bed in Sweden

V.V. Zyuganov received worldwide reputation after he discovered the fact of a negligible senescence and determined the maximum lifespan (210–250 years) of the freshwater pearl mussel (Margaritifera margaritifera). The data of V.V. Zyuganov have been confirmed by the Finnish malacologists and gained general acceptance. In general, the V.V. Zyuganov is the author of 120 scientific papers, 6 monographs, and patents.

Zyuganov is known as the author of antineoplastic drugs "Elixir Arctic +" and as the author of publications in popular scientific literature about human aging.

Zyuganov is the president of the international "Society Conservation Margaritiferidae" (SCM). A new society was formed at the Twelfth International Malacological Congress in Vigo, Spain in September 1995 to promote the conservation and management of margaritiferid species around the world. The freshwater pearlshells of the family Margaritiferidae include 25 nominal genera that inhabit rivers of North America and Eurasia, with some species and many populations in imminent danger of extinction or extirpation, respectively. The SCM was formed by a multinational cadre of scientists for the purpose of coordinating international efforts for research, management, and the protection of habitats critical to these species. One of the long-term goals of SCM is to create an international monograph on the systematics, distribution, ecology, and status of margaritiferids globally.

Since 1992, V.V. Zyuganov is supervisor the Salmon wildlife preserve of Varzuga.

V.V. Zyuganov was repeatedly elected a member and chairman of the Far East of the Ministry of Natural Resources of Russia, which examines allowable catches of Pacific salmon.

== Scientific activity ==
Zyuganov studied the evolution of marine and freshwater fauna, ecological and physiological basis of animal and human longevity. He was the supervisor and member of environmental projects in Russia, Germany, Spain, France, Britain, Norway and Sweden. Zyuganov investigated non-aging aquatic organisms in the laboratory and in 70 expeditions in Russia, the United States, 20 countries in Europe, Africa, and Southeast Asia on the coast of the Pacific and Indian oceans. Recently, Zyuganov has focused on studying the negligible senescence phenomenon. He shows himself as an apologist of the astrocytic hypothesis of aging of mammals in polemics with opponents.

== Partial bibliography ==
=== In English ===
- Ziuganov V.V. (1983). "Genetics of osteal plate polymorphism and microevolution of threespine stickleback (Gasterosteus aculeatus L.)". Theor. Appl. Genet. 65 (3): 239–246. doi:10.1007/BF00308075. PMID 24263421. S2CID 19473626.
- Ziuganov V. Comeluk V. (1985). "Hybridization of two forms of ninespine stickleback, Pungitius pungitius and P. platygaster, under experimental conditions and attempt to predict the consequences of their contact in nature". Environ. Biol. Fish. 13 (4): 241–251. Bibcode:1985EnvBF..13..241Z. doi:10.1007/BF00002908. S2CID 12391711.
- Ziuganov V.; Golovatjuk G.; Savvaitova K.; Bugaev V. (1987). "Genetically isolated sympatric forms of threespine stickleback, Gasterosteus aculeatus, in Lake Azabachije (Kamchatka-peninsula, USSR)". Environ. Biol. Fish. 18 (4): 241–247. Bibcode:1987EnvBF..18..241Z. doi:10.1007/BF00004877. S2CID 26711687.
- Ziuganov V.; Zotin A.; Nezlin L.; Tretiakov V. (1994). The freshwater pearl mussels and their relationships with salmonid fish. VNIRO Publishing House. ISBN 5-85382-126-1.
- Nezlin L.; Cunjak R.; Zotin A.; Ziuganov V. (1994). "Glochidium morphology of the freshwater pearl mussel (Margaritifera margaritifera) and glochidiosis of Atlantic salmon (Salmo salar): a study by scanning electron microscopy". Can. J. Zool. 72 (1): 15–21. Bibcode:1994CaJZ...72...15N. doi:10.1139/z94-003.
- Ziuganov, Valery; Miguel, Eduardo San; Neves, Richard J.; Longa, Angeles; Fernández, Carlos; Amaro, Rafaela; Beletsky, Victor; Popkovitch, Ekaterina; Kaliuzhin, Sviatoslav; Johnson, Torbjörn (2000). "Life span variation of the freshwater pearlshell: a model species for testing longevity mechanisms in animals". Ambio. XXIX (2): 102–105. Bibcode:2000Ambio..29..102Z. doi:10.1579/0044-7447-29.2.102. S2CID 86366534.
- Ziuganov, V.; Kaliuzhin, S.; Beletsky, V.; Popkovitch (2001). "The Pearl Mussel-Salmon Community in the Varzuga River, Northwest Russia: Problems of Environmental Impacts". In Bauer, G.; Wachtler, K. (eds.). Ecology and Evolution of the Freshwater Mussels Unionoida. Ecological Studies. Vol. 145. Berlin; Heidelberg: Springer - Verlag. pp. 359–366. doi:10.1007/978-3-642-56869-5_20. ISBN 3-540-67268-0. ISSN 0070-8356.
- Ziuganov, V.V. (2005). "A long-lived parasite extending the host life span: the pearl mussel Margaritifera margaritifera elongates host life by turns out the program of accelerated senescence in salmon Salmo salar". Dokl. Biol. Sci. 403 (1–6): 291–294. doi:10.1007/s10630-005-0115-9. PMID 16358576. S2CID 555396.
- Ziuganov V.V.; Popkovich E.G. (2005). "Arctic Teleost Fishes with Canceled Accelerated Senescence Program Are a Potential Source of Stress Protectors and Cancer Drugs". Biology Bulletin. 32 (5): 478–483. Bibcode:2005BioBu..32..478Z. doi:10.1007/s10525-005-0128-9. S2CID 20354776.
- Ziuganov V.V. (2006). "Mussel larvae - infected Atlantic Salmon with Canceled "Death Program" and Long Lived Arctic Stickleback Are a Potential Sources of Stress Protectors and Cancer Medication" (PDF). Integrated Sci. J. 13 (173): 56–68. ISSN 1729-3707.
- Ziuganov, V.V.; Beletsky, VV..; Neves, R.J.; Tretiakov, V.A; Mikhno, I.V.; Kaliuzhin, S.M. (1998). The Recreational Fishery for Atlantic Salmon and the Ecology of Salmon and Pearl Mussels in the Varzuga River, Northwest Russia. Virginia, USA: Virginia Tech. ISBN 5-85382-126-1.

=== In Russian ===
- Зюганов В.В., Лабас Ю.А., Хлебович В.В. 1987. Ионные каналы, гены и эволюция // Природа. N 9. C. 92-99
- Зюганов, В.В.; Незлин, Л.П.; Зотин, А.А.; Розанов, А.С. (1990). "Взаимоотношения паразит-хозяин у глохидиев европейской жемчужницы Margaritifera margaritifera (Margaritiferidae: Bivalvia) и массовых видов рыб европейского севера СССР" [The parasite-host relationships between the glochidia of the European pearl oyster Margaritifera margaritifera (Margaritiferidae: Bivalvia) and mass fish species in the European north of the USSR]. Parazitologiia. 24 (4): 315–321. PMID 2147985.
- Зюганов В.В. (Ziuganov V.V.) (1991). Фауна СССР. Рыбы. Семейство колюшковых (Gasterosteidae) мировой фауны [Fauna of USSR. Fishes. The family Gasterosteidae of word fish fauna] (in Russian). Vol. 5. Leningrad: Nauka. ISBN 5-02-025682-X.
- Зотин А.И.; Зюганов В.В. (1994). "Иммунные основы паразит-хозяинных отношений пресноводных жемчужниц семейства Margaritiferidae и лососевых рыб" [Immune bases of parasite-host relationships of freshwater pearl mussels of the family Margaritiferidae and salmon fishes]. Изв. РАН. Сер. Биол. (in Russian) (4): 701–708. ISSN 0002-3329.
- Зюганов В.В., Зотин А.А. 2001. Обыкновенная жемчужница Margaritifera margaritifera - Красная Книга Российской Федерации. Животные. С. 61–69. АСТ. Астрель.
- Зюганов В. В. 2009. Жемчужные симбиозы в Акртике и в тропиках // Нептун № 5. С. 96 - 100.
- Зюганов В.В. (2010). "Рецепты бессмертия. Биология гидробионтов - нестареющих жителей моря" [Recipes of immortality. The biology of ageless inhabitants of the sea] (PDF). Нептун [Neptune] (in Russian). 68 (3): 96–100.

== See also ==
- Atlantic salmon
- Freshwater pearl mussel
- Negligible senescence
- Symbiosis
