= Freshwater bivalve =

Kind of freshwater mollusc

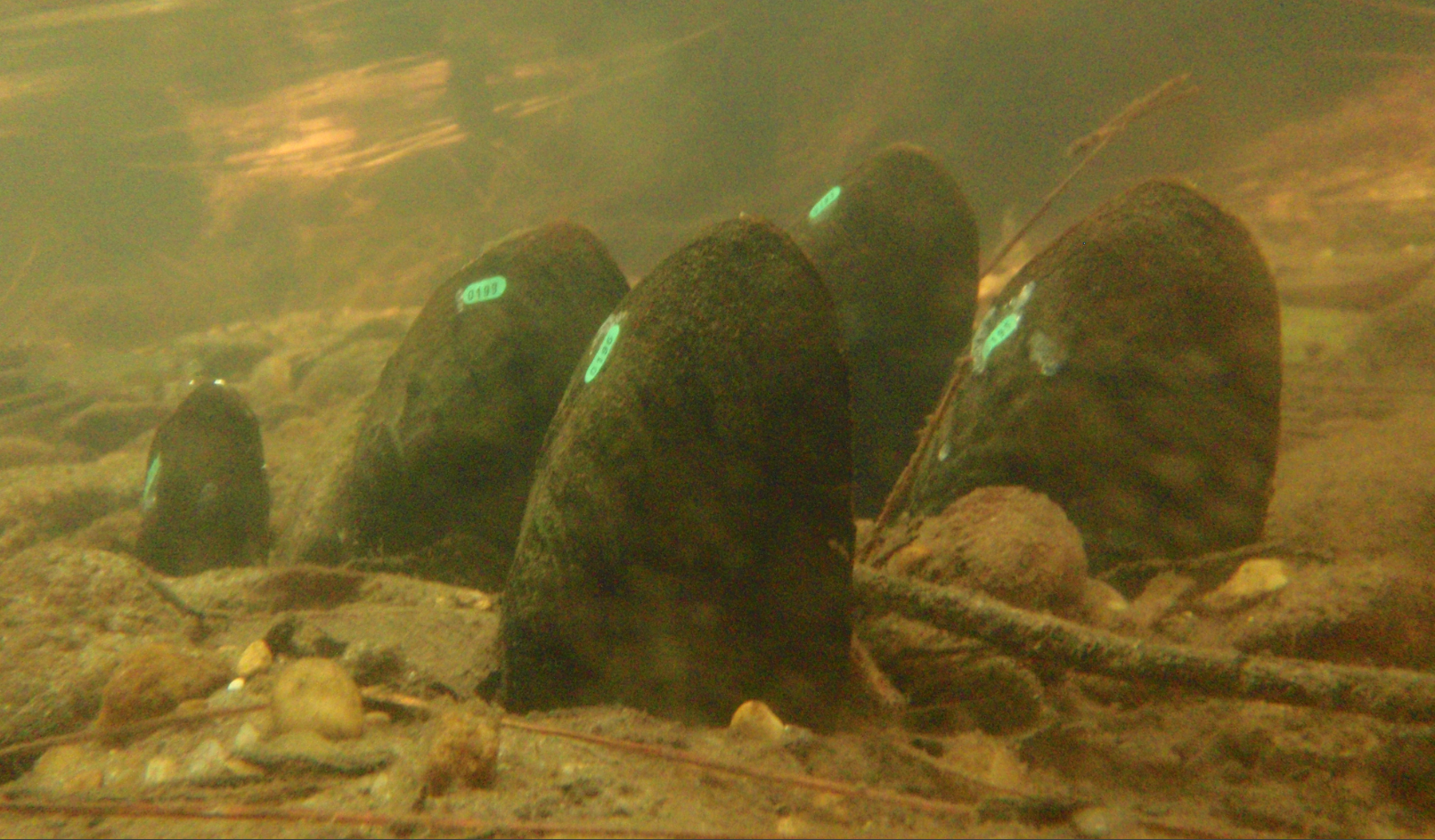
Margaritifera hembeli; these mussels were tagged with blue strips as part of a study

Freshwater bivalves are molluscs of the class Bivalvia that inhabit freshwater ecosystems. They are one of the two main groups of freshwater molluscs, along with freshwater snails. The majority of bivalve molluscs are saltwater species that live in the marine habitats, but a number of families have evolved to live in fresh water (and in some cases, also in brackish water). These belong to two different evolutionary lineages, i.e. freshwater mussels and freshwater clams, and the various groups are not closely related.

Freshwater bivalves are identified through differences in morphology that vary among taxa. While some species are short-lived, others can be quite long-lived, with some species registering longevity in the hundreds of years.

Freshwater bivalves are distributed throughout the world and can thrive in many different types of habitats, ranging from small ditches and ponds to large lakes, rivers, canals and wetlands. The ecology of freshwater bivalves varies among species with regard to differences in reproduction and predation. In spite of their variety of ecosystems, freshwater bivalves are some of the most endangered species on the planet. In North America, for instance, many freshwater mussel species have gone extinct, and of those remaining, 65 percent are rated as endangered, threatened or vulnerable. Droughts, forest clearing, farming, use of dams for water management, and changes in water temperature can all pose threats to freshwater bivalve populations. Restoration efforts focus on rebuilding lost mussel populations in the wild and using those mussels to improve and protect water quality and restore broader ecosystems.

Freshwater pearl mussels are economically important as a source of pearls and mother of pearl, and are sometimes consumed, though the destruction of their habitat along with overharvesting has greatly reduced their population.

== Morphology ==
Freshwater bivalve species vary greatly in size. Some pea clams (genus Pisidium) have an adult size of only 3 mm (0.12 in). In contrast, one of the largest species of freshwater bivalves is the swan mussel from the family Unionidae; it can grow to a length of 20 cm (7.9 in), and usually lives in lakes or slow-flowing rivers.

=== External ===
Freshwater bivalves, as their name implies, have a protective exoskeleton composed of two half-shells or "valves", connected via a soft ligament along a hinge (close to a protrusion on the shell called the umbo). These two valves are non-living, composed of both organic and inorganic substances that make up three major valve layers. The first, outermost layer is the thin epidermis (periostracum), followed by a second prismatic layer, containing calcium carbonate. The third and innermost layer is also the thickest and is most commonly referred to as the mother of pearl—a widely harvested source for the production of ornamental buttons.

The external appearances of these shells can be extremely variable when comparing members of different families, genera, species, as well as within a species (i;e between different populations). Valve surface appearances can range from smooth to dramatically sculpted, showcasing ornamental pustules, pimples, grooves, and ridges. The overall shape of the valve can also vary drastically, from laterally compressed and narrow, to wide and globular.

=== Internal ===
Within the shell, the living soft tissue can be found: the mantle is a multifunctional, generally thin and fragile structure that line bivalve interiors and encloses their bodies. This tissue secretes material to build the shell, and contains respiratory organs and facilitates feeding. The cavity that exists between the mantle and other soft tissues is aptly named the mantle cavity.

Anterior and posterior adductor muscles connect the left and right valves, facilitating shell opening and closure. The less major anterior and posterior retractor muscles extend from the shell and attach the body to a structure called the foot. This muscular foot is typical of most bivalves, extending anteriorly between the valves (via an anterior protractor muscle) and aiding in locomotion, burrowing and anchorage (holdfast).

Within the mantle cavity on either side of the foot are the gills, with the inner gills being adjacent to the foot and the outer gills nearest to the mantle and shell. As expected, these gills mainly act as a respiratory structure, performing gas exchange but can also facilitate filter feeding. Water enters the mantle cavity via an incurrent siphon, and passes over the gills where food particles are trapped by secreted mucus.

== Taxonomy ==
The study of freshwater bivalves predates Aristotle and has since been in a state of constant flux and dispute, regarding their identification and classification. As time has progressed, so too have different techniques and technologies that allow scientists to more comprehensively study the assemblages of organisms in the natural world, freshwater bivalves included. Modern genetic analysis has had major applications in the modern history of taxonomy and has been since utilized in the advancement of freshwater bivalve classification by allowing researchers to identify commonly used genes within these groups. The most commonly used method of identification/classification utilizes an exceptionally diverse set of ever-expanding morphological features, ranging from shell anatomy, variations in internal soft tissue, degrees of mantle fusion, to larval stage development.

=== Orders and families ===
- Anomalodesmata
  - Lyonsiidae
- Arcida
  - Arcidae (family)
  - Cardiidae
  - Corbiculidae
  - Sphaeriidae
  - Dreissenidae
  - Solenidae
  - Donacidae
- Mytiloida
  - Mytilidae
- Unionida
  - Etheriidae
  - Hyriidae
  - Iridinidae
  - Margaritiferidae
  - Mycetopodidae
  - Unionidae
- Venerida
  - Navavulidae
- Myida
  - Corbulidae
  - Erodonidae
  - Teredinidae

==== Unionida ====
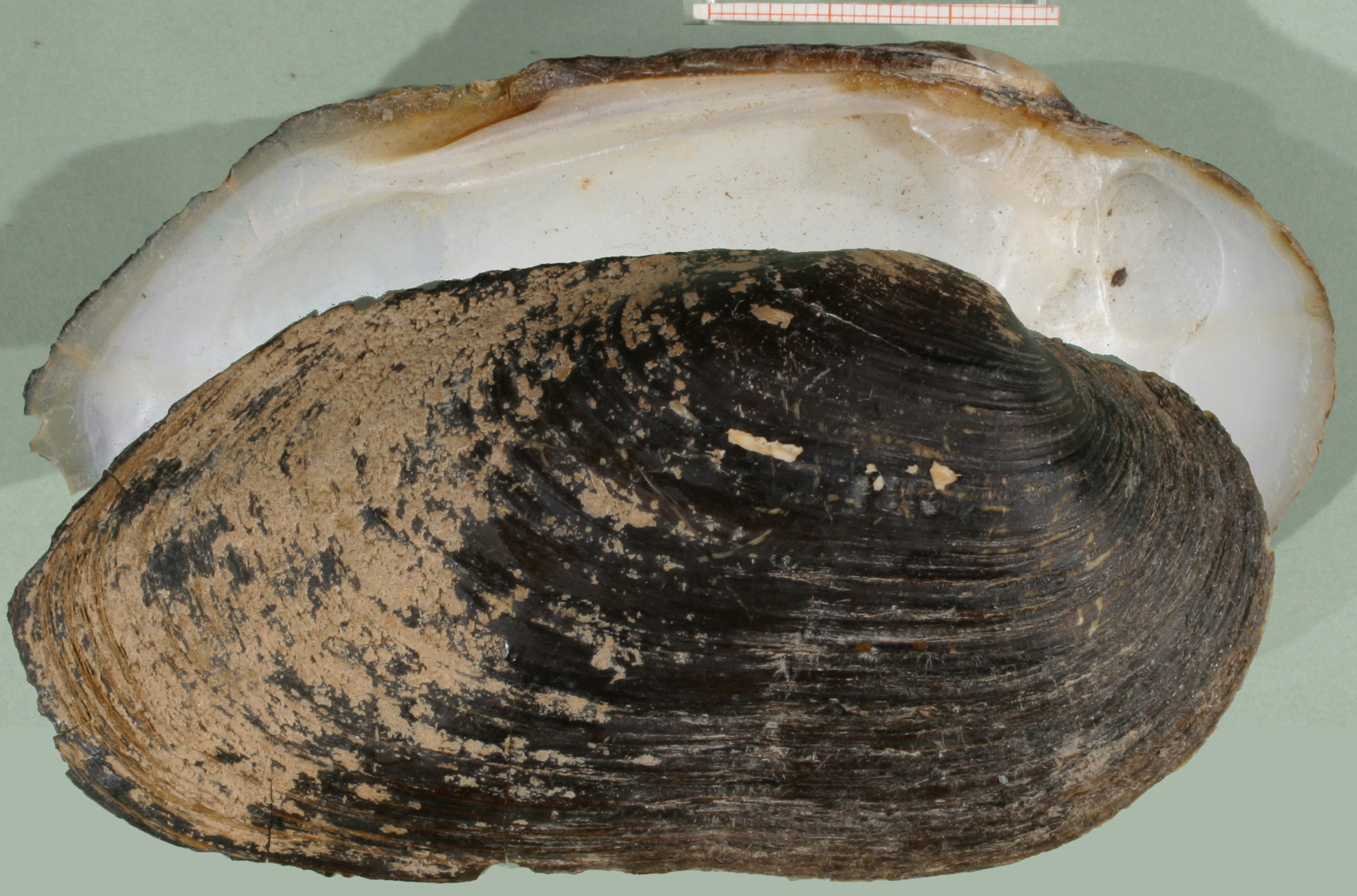
Family Margaritiferidae, a shell of Margaritifera auricularia

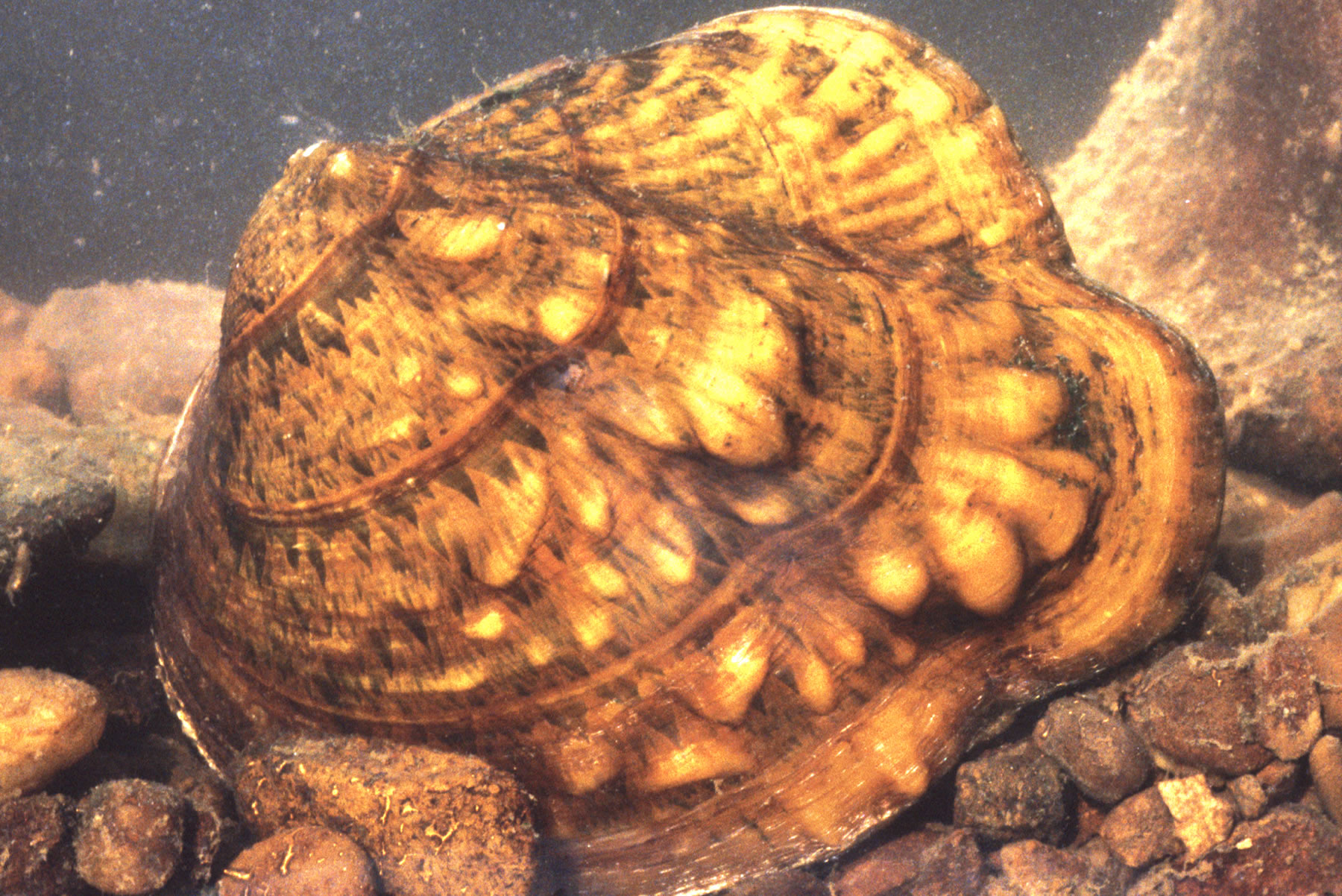
Family Unionidae, Quadrula metanevra, the monkeyface mussel

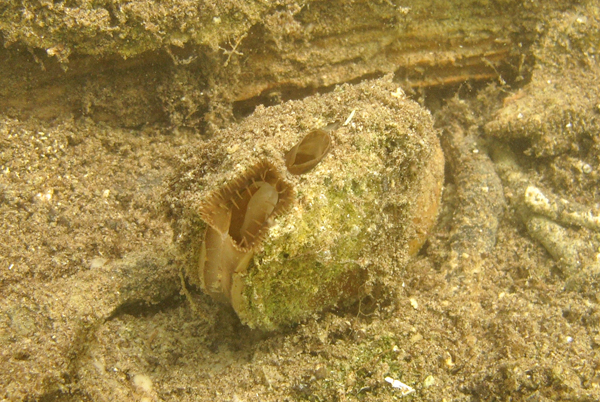
Family Unionidae, Anodonta cygnea, the swan mussel

The Unionida, of worldwide distribution, are the pearly freshwater mussels. All reproduce by means of a larval stage that is parasitic on a fish or salamander. Many species were historically utilized as sources of mother-of-pearl.

Families:

- Margaritiferidae
- Unionidae
- Hyriidae
- Etheriidae
- Mutelidae
- Mycetopodidae
- Iridinidae

==== Veneroida ====
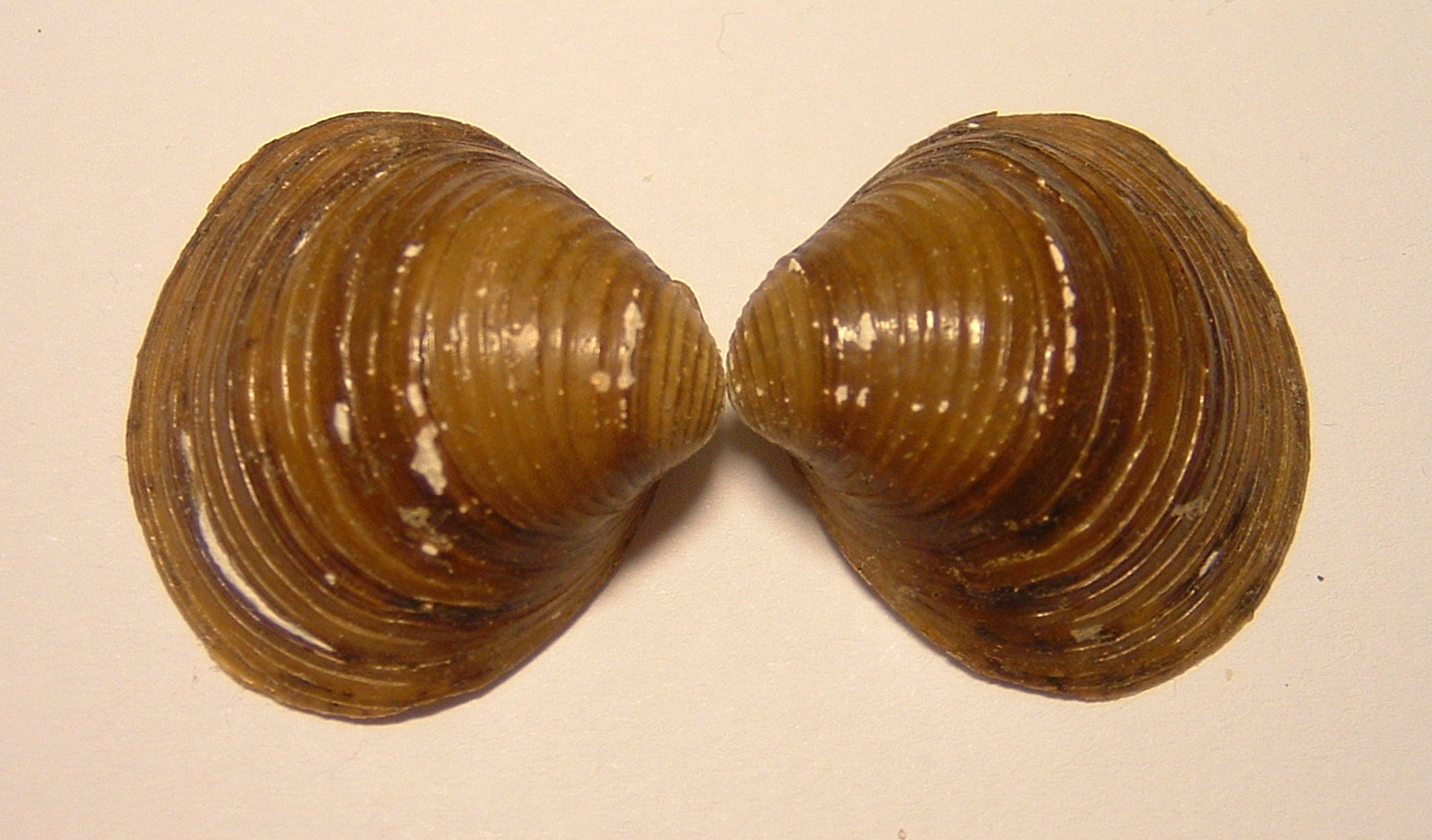
Family Corbiculidae, shell of Corbicula fluminea

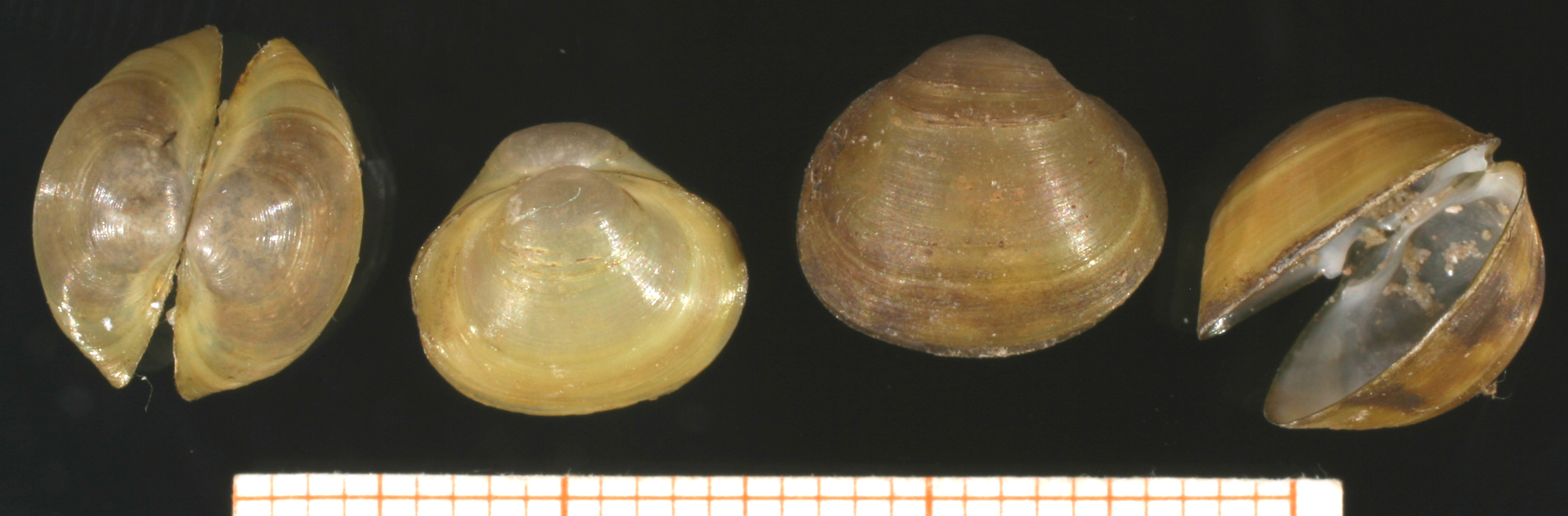
Family Sphaeriidae, Sphaerium corneum, one of the small fingernail clams.

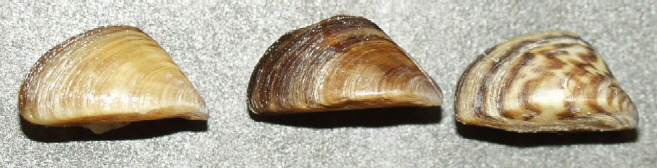
Family Dreissenidae, Dreissena polymorpha

The Veneroida is a large group of bivalve "clams", most of which are marine. However, several families occur in fresh and brackish waters.

Families:

- Corbiculidae
- Sphaeriidae
- Dreissenidae

== Distribution ==
The exact distribution of every freshwater bivalve genera cannot be ascertained because of the lack of data in certain areas of the world like Africa and South America, but freshwater bivalves have been found in all of Earth's biogeographic realms, except for the Antarctic biogeographic realm. There are 40 freshwater bivalve genera in the Palearctic biogeographic realm, 59 in the Nearctic, 23 in the Afrotropical, 51 in the Neotropical, 47 in the Oriental, 13 in the Australasian, and two in the Pacific Ocean Islands, for a total of 206 freshwater bivalve genera currently identified in the world. Some freshwater bivalves native to the Oriental and Nearctic biogeographic realms have been introduced to other regions: the two genera from the Pacific Ocean Islands were introduced to Hawaii. As new methods of identifying and locating freshwater bivalves improve, the distribution of where these freshwater bivalves occur can become more apparent.

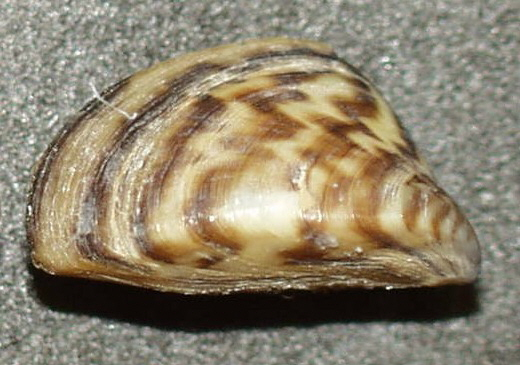
Dreissena polymorpha, the zebra mussel.

=== As invasive species ===
Dreissenidae are a family of freshwater mollusks found across Eurasia and North America. The most common types of dreissenids considered to be invasive species are Dreissena polymorpha (zebra mussel) and Dreissena rostriformis (quagga mussel). These mussels damage both ecological systems and human infrastructure. In North America, biofouling caused by dreissenids created an estimated 267 million dollars’ worth of damage between 1989 and 2004. When introduced to freshwater ecosystems, dreissenids lead to a decline in indigenous marine animal populations and are also known for causing benthic algae and cyanobacterial blooms. The total impact of dreissenids on freshwater ecosystems is still unknown.

== Biology ==
Freshwater bivalves are filter feeders and provide an ecological service by improving water quality in the bodies of water they inhabit, such as rivers, lakes, and wetlands. Water quality is improved by filtering out fine particles of silt, organic matter, and heavy metals as well as bacteria and phytoplankton in the water column to reduce turbidity. They are important bioindicators of freshwater ecosystems because they are the connection between the water column and the benthos, for they can provide information on the quality of the water based on the particles and toxins that bioaccumulate in the tissue of bivalves.

Freshwater bivalves are also important in the process of nutrient cycling because they deposit organic matter in the sediment through biodeposition created from the fine particles they filter in. Organic matter can be deposited in the sediment as feces or dead matter, and depending on if the right environmental conditions are present, such as hypoxia, sediment denitrification can occur, releasing nitrogen back into the atmosphere. However, other organisms are unable to utilize this inorganic form of nitrogen, so freshwater bivalves can also excrete dissolved nutrients in an accessible form for primary producers and consumers to assimilate. Any nutrients that were retained by the freshwater bivalve through its lifespan for building shell tissue can serve as a long-term nutrient storage in the benthos when the organism dies, depending on water chemistry and flow conditions. Considering freshwater bivalves can filter particles and process nutrients in the nutrient cycle, there are other species of freshwater bivalves that have more specialized ecosystem functions as well as different vulnerabilities.

=== Reproduction ===
Freshwater bivalves can utilize either ovoviviparous or viviparous reproduction strategies: ovoviviparity means that embryos develop and grow in eggs inside the female until they are ready to be released. The embryos get nutrition from egg yolk, but are not connected to the mother by a placental connection. In contrast, viviparity means the embryos develop inside the body of a female and usually gain nutrition by a placental connection. Females tend to have a single reproductive spawning period (when the ova moves to the gills) while males tend to have two spawning periods (a release of sperm into the water column). In the Tocantins River of Brazil, females have highest ovum count, or mature female reproductive cells, during September with a gradual decrease until December. Males spawn between September and December with a second spawning period between May and July. Males release their sperm into the water column for females to accept. Females take up the sperm along with water through their respiratory system and have the potential to become fertilized when the sperm meets the ova. In contrast to marine bivalves, most female freshwater bivalve species hold the fertilized embryos until they develop into larvae when they are released into the water.

=== Larvae ===
Once the larvae of Unionida are released into the water column, they become semi-parasitic and attach to a host where they grow into juveniles while doing little to no damage to the host; often, this is the gills of various freshwater fish. The Unionida have an obligate parasitic larval stage where the larvae are attached to the gills, fins or the body of a particular host fish: these are called glochidia.

Microbial water composition and sediment composition are important in larval nutrition.

=== Threats ===
In general, freshwater bivalves have predators such as raccoons, otters, some species of fish, and some species of turtles. Invasive species pose a risk to freshwater bivalve populations. In Europe, two invasive species of crayfish, Procambarus clarkii and Pacifastacus leniusculus, are predators of the freshwater bivalve species Anodonta anatina.

Droughts, floods, and heat waves are a few examples of major climatic events that are happening more frequently because of climate change; in concert, these are a huge killer of freshwater bivalve populations.

== Relation to humans ==
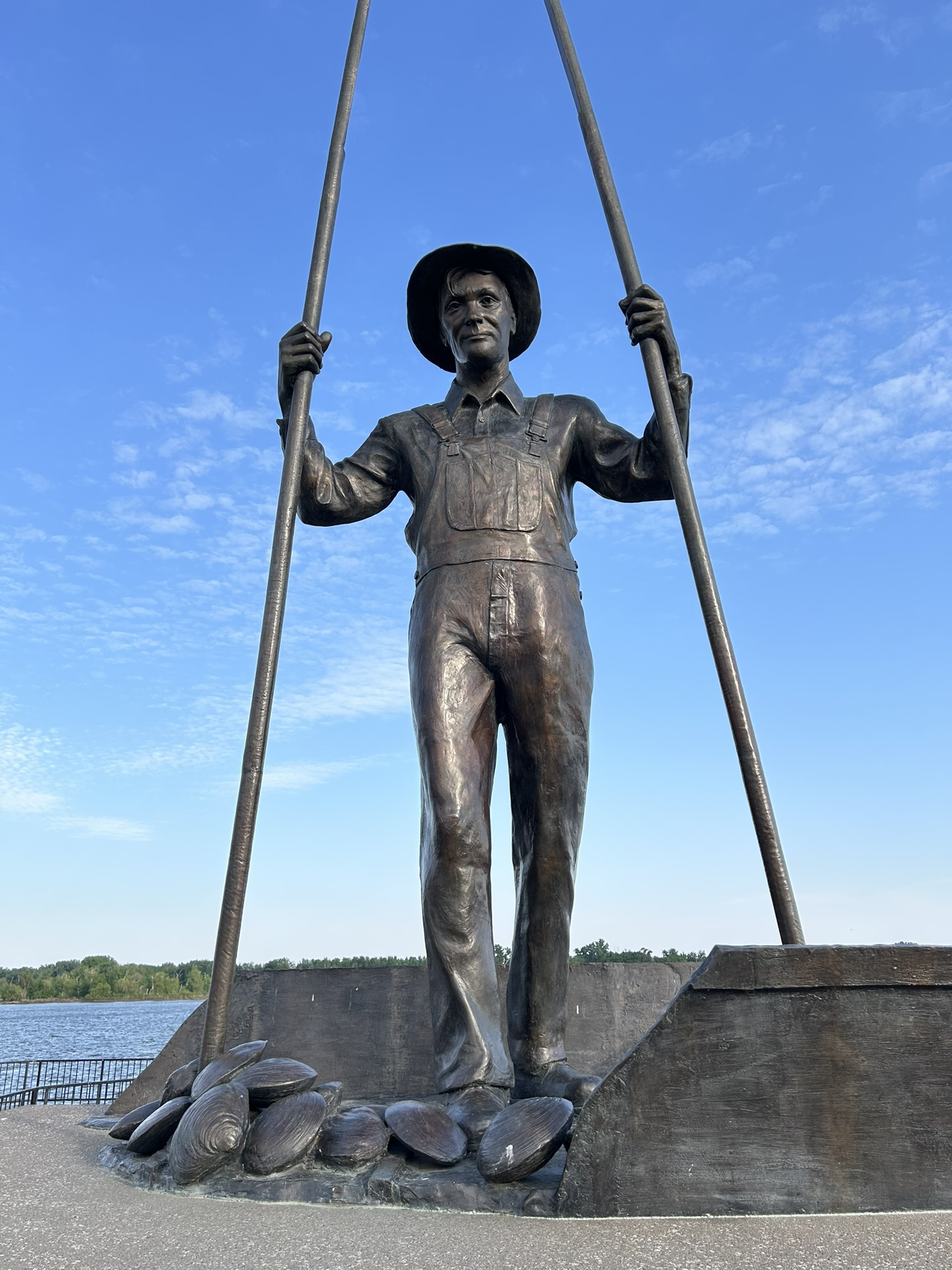
Statue of a clammer harvesting mussels in the Mississippi River at Muscatine, Iowa for the pearl button industry.

Pollution, human disturbance, invasive species, and ecosystem modification are the main threats to freshwater bivalves. In North America freshwater bivalves are extremely threatened, with 202 of 300 species considered critical, possibly extinct, or extinct. Of the dangers facing freshwater bivalves, eighty-five percent of them are considered to be “ongoing threats”. Ecosystem modification and pollution are currently the two biggest threats to molluscs and gastropods in Palearctic and Nearctic ecozones. Pollution is the dominant issue for these animals in the Afrotropic and Indomalayan biogeographic realms. For the Neotropics and Australasia biogeographic realms, ecosystem modification has the largest impact on freshwater bivalve species. Hydropower plants and dams are two examples of human ecosystem modification which contributes to loss of habitat as well as changes to channel morphology, river and floodplain connectivity and nutrient limitation. Rates of extinction among freshwater bivalves are higher than those of terrestrial groups which share the same ecosystem. Among those bivalves, freshwater gastropods are the most highly threatened due to smaller species distribution. Freshwater bivalves are at a heightened risk for endangerment and extinction because of the connectivity of river systems. Anthropogenic impacts on rivers spread throughout the whole ecosystem.
