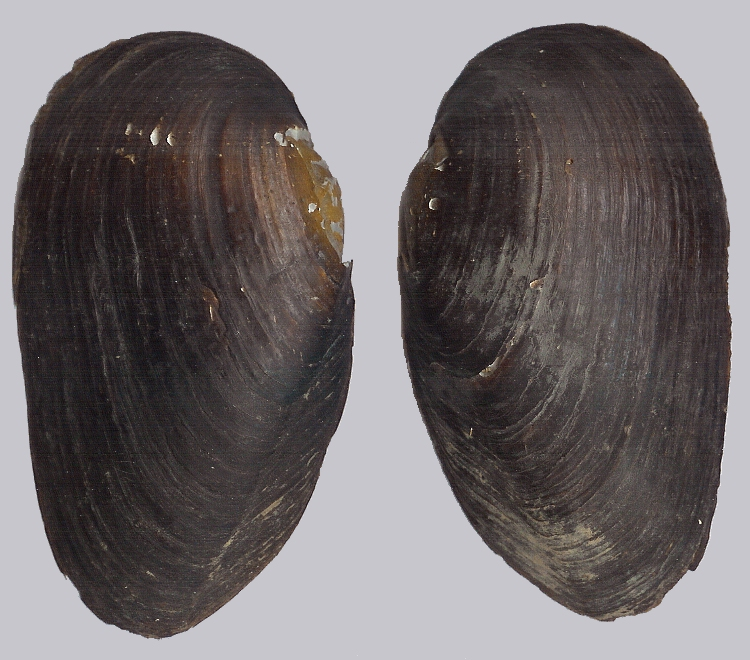
- Separated valves of a shell of Margaritifera margaritifera

Scientific classification
- Kingdom: Animalia
- Phylum: Mollusca
- Class: Bivalvia
- Order: Unionida
- Superfamily: Unionoidea
- Family: Margaritiferidae; Haas, 1940

Genera
- See text for genera

= Margaritiferidae =

Margaritiferidae Temporal range: Middle Jurassic - present, 170–0 Ma

Family of bivalves

Margaritiferidae is a family of medium-sized freshwater mussels, aquatic bivalve molluscs in the order Unionida. It is the most threatened of all unionid families.

The family is sometimes referred to as the freshwater pearl mussel family, but "freshwater pearl mussel" more often applies to the species Margaritifera margaritifera. The name refers to the thick layer of nacre (mother of pearl) lining the interior of the shell of the species, which enables them to produce pearls.

== Taxonomy ==
A 2018 study suggested a new phylogeny and systematics of the Margaritiferidae, comprising two subfamilies, Gibbosulinae and Margaritiferinae, and four genera, Gibbosula, Cumberlandia, Margaritifera, and Pseudunio.

This family has ancient origins, having diverged from the ancestors of the Unionidae during the Late Triassic with the crown group of the Margaritiferidae arising by the Middle Jurassic, and both extant subfamilies diverging by the Late Jurassic. All extant genera diverged from one another by the Late Jurassic or Early Cretaceous.

=== Genera ===
Genera within the family Margaritiferidae include:

==== Subfamily Margaritiferinae ====
- Cumberlandia Ortmann, 1912
- Margaritifera Schumacher, 1815
- Pseudunio Haas, 1910

==== Subfamily Gibbosulinae ====
- Gibbosula Simpson, 1900

==== Fossil genera ====
Several fossil genera are known, dating back to the Middle Jurassic:

- †Palaeomargaritifera Ma, 1984 (Middle Jurassic of Sichuan, China)
- Subfamily Margaretiferinae
  - †Asturianaia Van Damme & Bogan, 2015 (Middle to Late Jurassic of Niger and Spain)
  - †"Margaritifera" crosthwaitei (Newton, 1909) (Late Jurassic of Egypt)
  - †Paraheudeana (Early Cretaceous of Spain)
