= Syngamus merulae =

Scientific classification
- Domain: Eukaryota
- Kingdom: Animalia
- Phylum: Nematoda
- Class: Chromadorea
- Order: Rhabditida
- Family: Syngamidae
- Genus: Syngamus
- Species: S. merulae

Binomial name
- Syngamus merulae Baylis, 1926

Species of roundworm

Syngamus merulae is a parasitic nematode worm infecting the tracheas of birds including thrushes. It is closely related to the gapeworm, Syngamus trachea.

== Cited texts ==
- Rothschild, Miriam; Clay, Theresa (1953). Fleas, Flukes and Cuckoos. A study of bird parasites. London: Collins.
