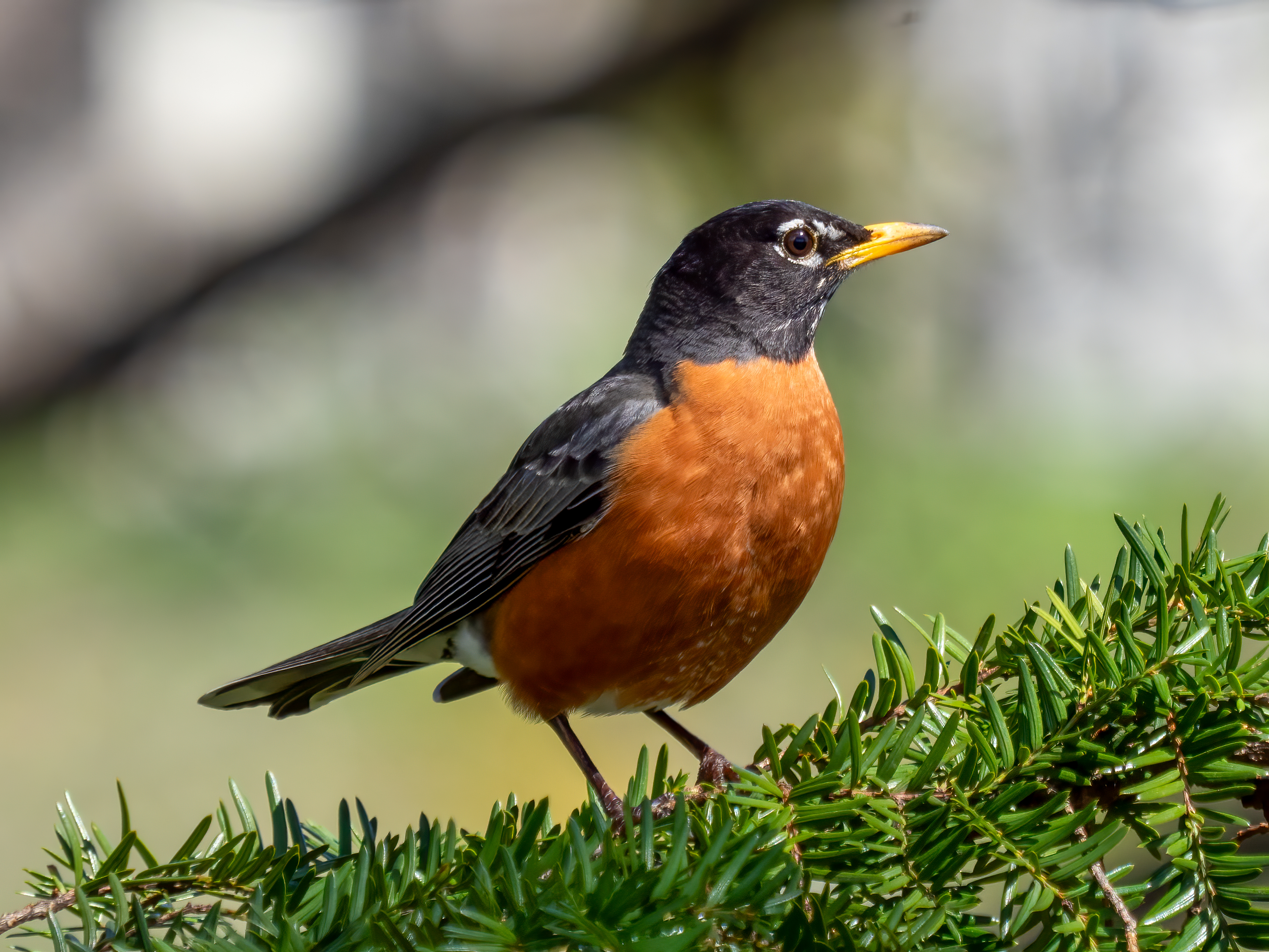
- Nominate T. m. migratorius, male, Brooklyn, New York

Conservation status
- Least Concern (IUCN 3.1)

- Secure (NatureServe)

Scientific classification
- Kingdom: Animalia
- Phylum: Chordata
- Class: Aves
- Order: Passeriformes
- Family: Turdidae
- Genus: Turdus
- Species: T. migratorius

Binomial name
- Turdus migratorius Linnaeus, 1766
- Breeding range Year-round range Wintering range

Synonyms
- Merula migratoria; Planesticus migratorius

= American robin =

American robin Temporal range: Late Pleistocene – present

Species of bird

The American robin (Turdus migratorius) is a migratory bird of the true thrush genus and Turdidae, the wider thrush family. It is named after the European robin because of its reddish-orange breast, though the two species are not closely related, with the European robin belonging to the Old World flycatcher family. The American robin is widely distributed throughout North America, wintering from southern Canada to central Mexico and along the Pacific coast.

According to the Partners in Flight database (2019), the American robin is the most abundant landbird in North America (with 370 million individuals), ahead of red-winged blackbirds, introduced European starlings, mourning doves and house finches. It has seven subspecies.

The species is active mostly during the day and assembles in large flocks at night. Its diet consists of invertebrates (such as beetle grubs, earthworms, and caterpillars), fruits, and berries. It is one of the earliest bird species to lay its eggs, beginning to breed shortly after returning to its summer range from its winter range. The robin's nest consists of long coarse grass, twigs, paper, and feathers and is smeared with mud and often cushioned with grass or other soft materials. It is among the earliest birds to sing at dawn, and its song consists of several discrete units that are repeated.

The adult's main predator is the domestic cat; other predators include hawks and snakes. When feeding in flocks, it can be vigilant, watching other birds for reactions to predators. Brown-headed cowbirds (Molothrus ater) lay their eggs in robin nests (see brood parasite), but the robins usually reject the egg.

== Taxonomy ==
This species was first described in 1766 by Carl Linnaeus in the twelfth edition of his Systema Naturae as Turdus migratorius. The binomial name derives from two Latin words: turdus, "thrush", and migratorius from migrare "to migrate". The term robin for this species has been recorded since at least 1703.

A 2020 genetic study has shown that the American robin is closest to the rufous-collared thrush (T. rufitorques) of Central America, confirming a 2007 study which also placed this as its closest relative. A 2026 genetic study has suggested rufous-collared thrush may even be genetically embedded within American robin populations, but that conversely, the Baja California Sur population of American robin (T. m. confinis) is basal to both, and may deserve treatment as a separate species. Though having distinct plumage, the two species are similar in vocalization and behavior. Beyond this, it lies in a group of other Central American thrushes, suggesting a recent spread northwards into North America; the 2007 study suggested rufous-backed thrush (T. rufopalliatus; not included in the 2020 study) as the next closest relative, with both studies giving the next-closest relatives beyond this trio as the species pair of black thrush (T. infuscatus) and sooty thrush (T. nigrescens), also of Central America.

These results contrast markedly with two older studies of the mitochondrial cytochrome b gene which had suggested, though only with weak support, that the American robin might be more closely related to the Kurrichane thrush (T. libonyanus) and the olive thrush (T. olivaceus), both African species, rather than other American thrushes.

=== Subspecies ===
Seven subspecies are accepted. These, except for the isolated T. m. confinis, intergrade with each other and are only weakly defined.

- T. m. nigrideus Aldrich, JW & Nutt, DC, 1939 – breeds from coastal northern Quebec to Labrador and Newfoundland and winters from southern Newfoundland south through most of the eastern U.S. states to southern Louisiana, southern Mississippi, and northern Georgia. It is uniformly darker or blackish on the head, with a dark gray back. The underparts are slightly richer red than those of the nominate subspecies.
- T. m. migratorius Linnaeus, C, 1766 – the nominate subspecies, breeds in the U.S. and Canada, other than down the West Coast, to the edge of the tundra from Alaska and northern Canada east to New England and then south to Maryland, northwestern Virginia, and North Carolina. It winters in southern coastal Alaska, southern Canada, most of the U.S., Bermuda, the Bahamas and eastern Mexico.
- T. m. achrusterus (Batchelder, CF, 1900) – breeds from southern Oklahoma east to Maryland and western Virginia and south to northern Florida and the Gulf Coast states. It winters through much of the southern part of the breeding range. It is marginally smaller than the eastern subspecies. The black feathers of the forehead and crown have pale gray tips. The underparts are paler than those of the eastern subspecies.
- T. m. caurinus (Grinnell, J, 1909) – breeds in southeastern Alaska through coastal British Columbia to Washington and northwestern Oregon. It winters from southwestern British Columbia south to central and southern California and east to northern Idaho. It is slightly smaller than the eastern subspecies and very dark-headed. The white on the tips of the outer two tail feathers is restricted.
- T. m. propinquus Ridgway, R, 1877 – breeds from southeastern British Columbia, southern Alberta, and southwestern Saskatchewan south to southern California and northern Baja California. It winters throughout much of the southern breeding range and south to Baja California. It is the same size as, or slightly larger than, the eastern subspecies, but paler and tinged more heavily brownish-gray. It has very little white on the tip of the outermost tail feathers. Some birds, probably females, lack almost any red below. Males are usually darker and may show pale or whitish sides to the head.
- T. m. phillipsi Bangs, O, 1915 – is resident in Mexico south to central Oaxaca. It is slightly smaller than the western subspecies, but has a larger bill; the male's underparts are less brick-red than the eastern subspecies and have a rustier tone.
- T. m. confinis Baird, SF, 1864 – breeds above 1,000 m (3,300 ft) in the Sierra de la Laguna mountains of southern Baja California. This isolated non-migratory subspecies is particularly distinctive. It is relatively small, and the palest subspecies, with uniform pale gray-brown on the head, face, and upperparts, and pale buffy orange underparts. It usually lacks any white spots to the tips of the outer tail feathers, which have white edges. It has sometimes been classed as a separate species, but both the American Ornithologists' Union and the IOC World Bird List regard it as only a subspecies, albeit in a different group from the other six subspecies.
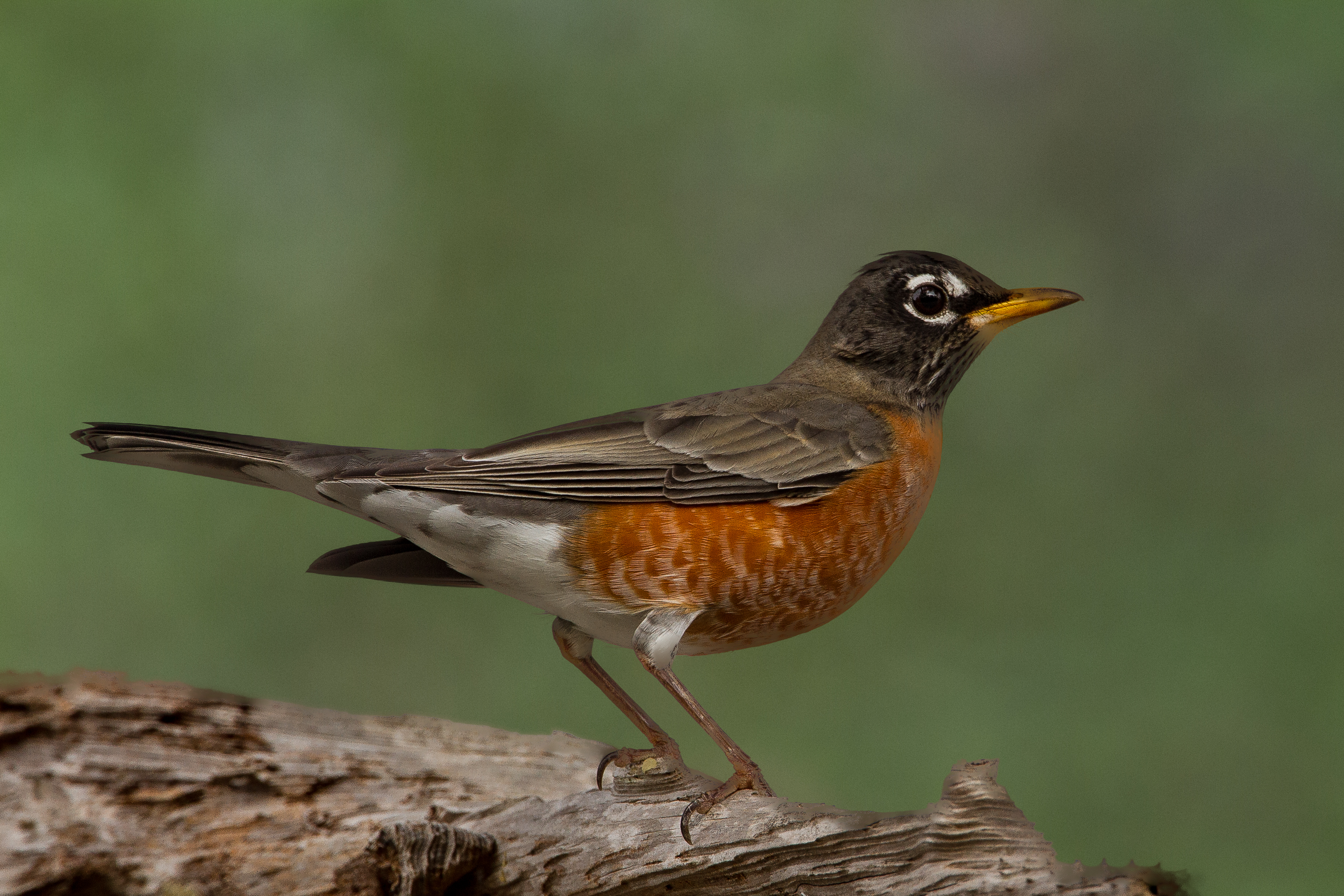
T. m. achrusterus, female
Florida

T. m. caurinus
Tofino, BC, Canada

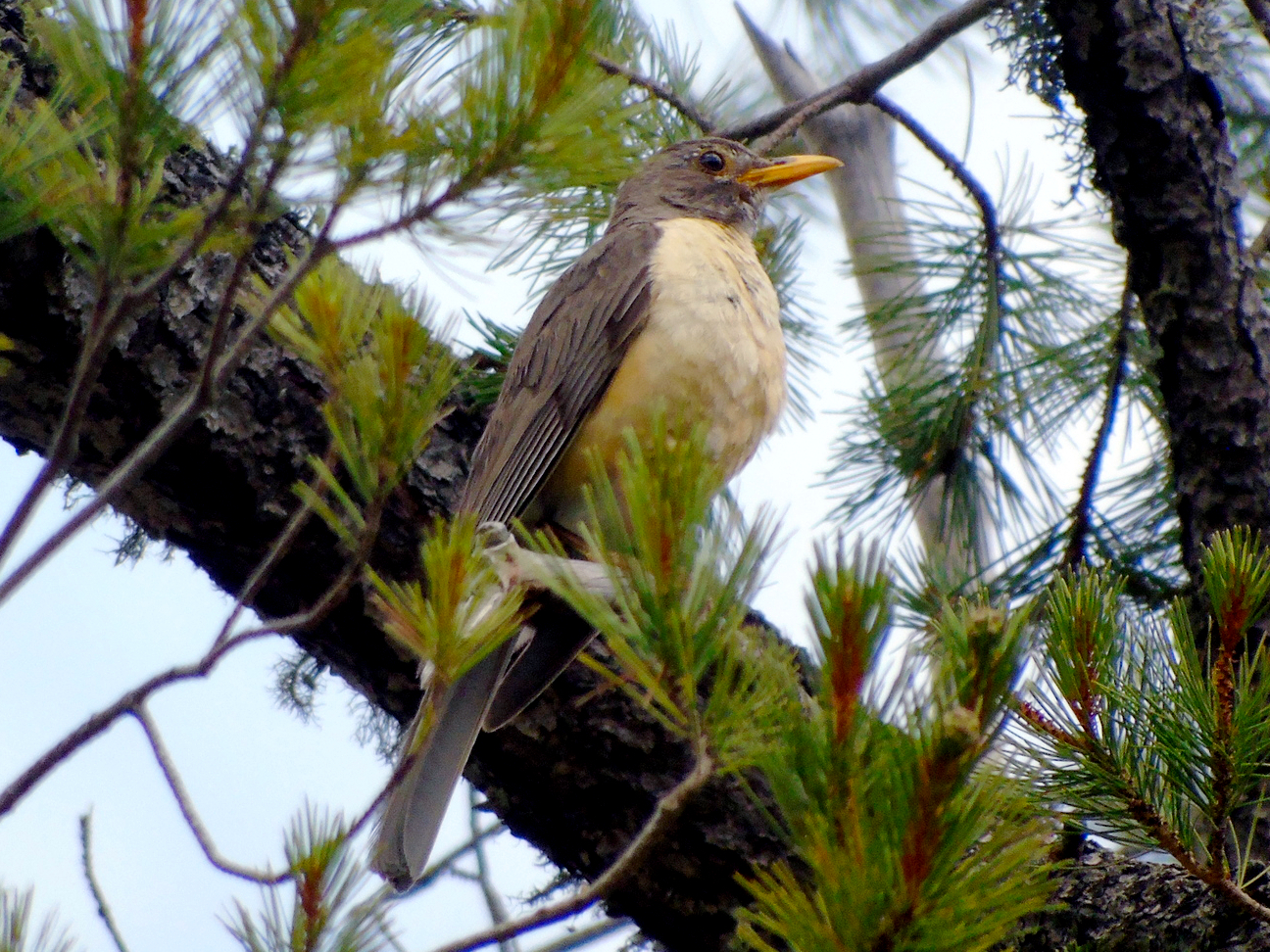
T. m. confinis
Baja California Sur, Mexico

== Description ==
Video of a male robin singing

American robin song (with a black-capped chickadee in background)

The eastern subspecies (T. m. migratorius) is 23 to 28 cm (9.1 to 11.0 in) long with a wingspan ranging from 31 to 41 cm (12 to 16 in), with similar size ranges across all subspecies. The species averages about 77 g (2.7 oz) in weight, with males ranging from 72 to 94 g (2.5 to 3.3 oz) and females ranging from 59 to 91 g (2.1 to 3.2 oz). Among standard measurements, the wing chord is 11.5 to 14.5 cm (4.5 to 5.7 in), the culmen is 1.8 to 2.2 cm (0.71 to 0.87 in) and the tarsus is 2.9 to 3.3 cm (1.1 to 1.3 in). The head varies from jet black to gray, with white eye arcs and white supercilia. The throat is white with black streaks, and the belly and undertail coverts are white. The adult has a brown back and a reddish-orange breast, varying from a rich red maroon to peachy orange. The bill is mainly yellow with a variably dark tip, the dusky area becoming more extensive in winter, and the legs and feet are brown.

The sexes are similar, but females tend to be duller in color than males, with a brown tint to the head, brown upperparts, and less-bright underparts. However, some birds cannot be accurately sexed on the sole basis of plumage. Juveniles are paler in color than adult males and have dark spots on their breasts and whitish wing coverts. First-year birds are not easily distinguishable from adults, but they tend to be duller, with first-year males resembling adult females, and a small percentage retain a few juvenile wing coverts or other feathers.

== Distribution and habitat ==
The species breeds throughout most of North America, from Alaska and Canada southward to northern Florida and Mexico. While robins occasionally overwinter in the northern part of the United States and southern Canada, most migrate to winter south of Canada from Florida and the Gulf Coast to central Mexico, as well as along the Pacific Coast. Most depart south by the end of August and begin to return north in February and March (exact dates vary with latitude and climate). The distance by which they migrate varies significantly depending on their initial habitat; a study found that individual robins tagged in Alaska are known to travel as much as 3.5 times farther across seasons than robins tagged in Massachusetts.

The species is a rare vagrant to western Europe, where the majority of records have been in Great Britain, where 30 had been recorded up to the end of 2024. The species has occurred as a vagrant to Greenland, Sweden, Jamaica, Hispaniola, Puerto Rico and Belize. Vagrants to Europe, where identified to subspecies, are the eastern subspecies (T. m. migratorius), but the Greenland birds included the Newfoundland subspecies (T. m. nigrideus), and some of the southern overshots may have been the southern subspecies (T. m. achrusterus).

The breeding habitat is woodland and more open farmland and urban areas. It becomes less common as a breeder in the southernmost part of the Deep South of the United States and there prefers large shade trees on lawns. Its winter habitat is similar but includes more open areas.

=== Diseases ===
The species is a known reservoir (carrier) for West Nile virus spread by Culex mosquitoes. While crows and jays are often the first noticed deaths in an area with West Nile virus, the American robin is suspected to be a key host and holds a larger responsibility for the transmission of the virus to humans. This is because, while crows and jays die quickly from the virus, the American robin survives the virus longer, hence spreading it to more mosquitoes, which then transmit the virus to humans and other species.

A successful West Nile virus vaccine has been administered to six 3-5 week old American robins. A DNA vaccine injected intramuscularly resulted in a 400-fold decrease in average viral load that would likely make robins noninfectious and unable to spread disease. An oral bait is the preferred method of distribution of the vaccine as it would be easier and cheaper than intramuscular injection, but more research would be needed as the existing formulation did not work orally.

== Behavior ==
The American robin is active mostly during the day, and on its winter grounds, it assembles in large flocks at night to roost in trees in secluded swamps or dense vegetation. The flocks break up during the day when the birds feed on fruits and berries in smaller groups. During the summer, males defend a breeding territory and are less social.

=== Diet ===
The diet generally consists of around 40 percent small invertebrates (mainly insects), such as earthworms, beetle grubs, caterpillars, and grasshoppers, and 60 percent wild and cultivated fruits and berries. Their ability to switch to berries allows them to winter much farther north than most other North American thrushes. They will flock to fermented Pyracantha berries, and after eating sufficient quantities will exhibit intoxicated behavior, such as falling over while walking. Robins forage primarily on the ground for soft-bodied invertebrates, and find worms by sight (and sometimes by hearing), pouncing on them and then pulling them up. Nestlings are fed mainly on earthworms and other soft-bodied animal prey. In some areas, robins, particularly of the northwestern subspecies (T. m. caurinus), will feed on beaches, taking insects and small mollusks. American robins are common pests of fruit orchards in North America. Due to their insectivorous and frugivorous diet they have evolved to lose sucrase. Sucrose is unpalatable to them and can be used by humans as a deterrent.

The species uses auditory, visual, olfactory and possibly vibrotactile cues to find prey, but vision is the predominant mode of prey detection. It is frequently seen running across lawns picking up earthworms, and its running and stopping behavior is a distinguishing characteristic. In addition to hunting visually, it also has the ability to hunt by hearing. Experiments have shown that it can find earthworms underground by simply using its listening skills. It typically will take several short hops and then cock its head left, right or forward to detect movement of its prey. In urban areas, robins will gather in numbers soon after lawns are mowed or where sprinklers are in use.

=== Threats ===
Juveniles and eggs are preyed upon by squirrels, snakes, and some birds. Adults are primarily taken by Accipiter hawks, cats, and larger snakes such as black rat snakes and gopher snakes. Canids such as foxes and dogs take fledglings from the ground. Raccoons often prey upon nests, while small agile carnivores such as American martens, ringtails and long-tailed weasels hunt adults. The greatest predatory impact is probably from raptorial birds. 28 raptorial bird species hunt American robins. Adult robins are most vulnerable while breeding activities, whereas feeding flocks are vigilant for predators.

The American robin rejects cowbird eggs, so brood parasitism by the brown-headed cowbird is rare, and the parasite's chick does not often survive to fledging. In a study of 105 juvenile robins, 77.1% were infected with endoparasites, Syngamus sp. being the most commonly encountered, in 57.1% of the birds.

=== Breeding ===
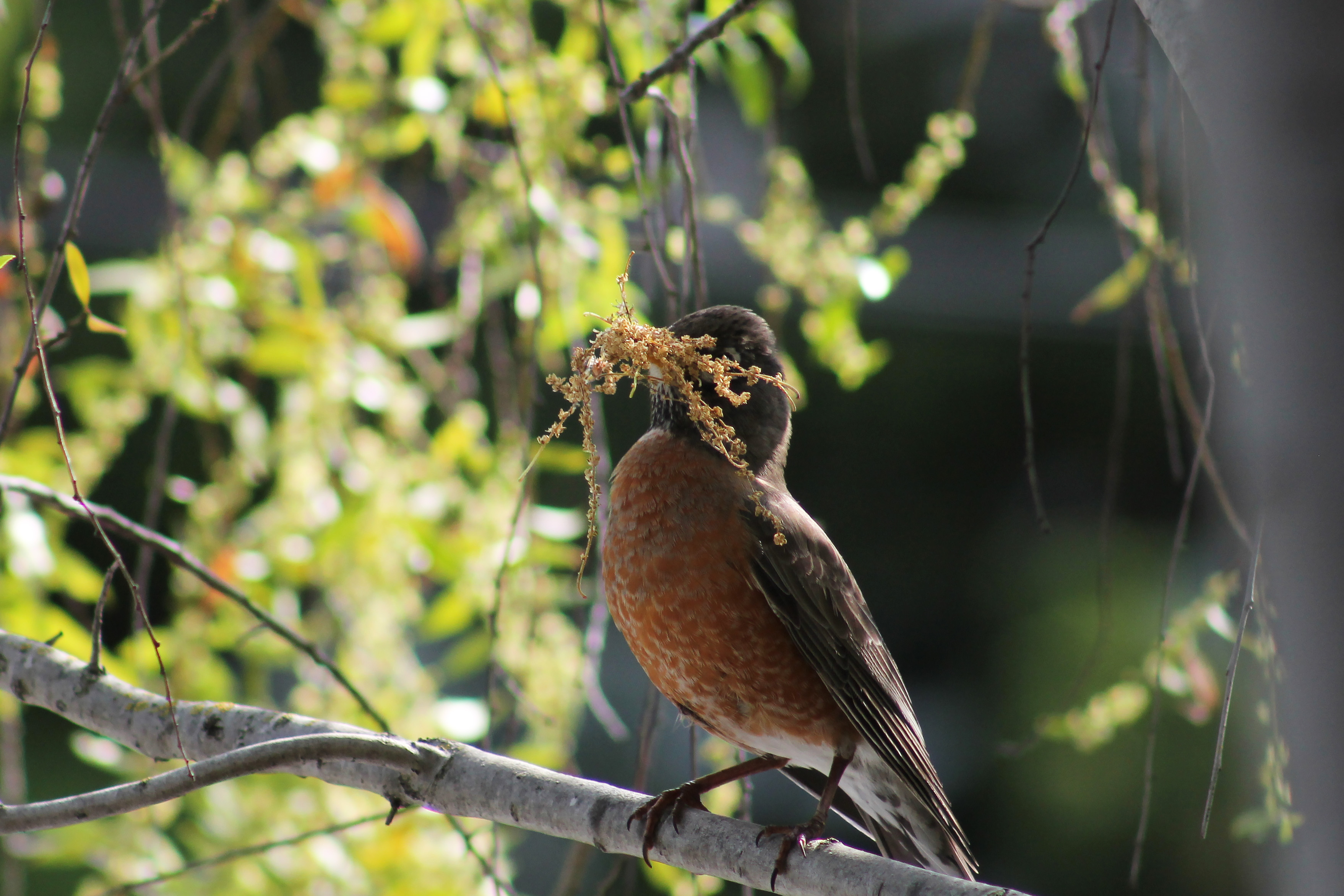
With nest-making materials

Breeding begins shortly after the returning to the summer range. The species is one of the first North American birds to lay eggs, and normally has two to three broods per breeding season, which lasts from April to July.

The nest is most commonly located 1.5–4.5 m (4.9–14.8 ft) above the ground in a dense bush or in a fork between two tree branches, and is built by the female alone. The outer foundation consists of long coarse grass, twigs, paper, and feathers. This is lined with smeared mud and cushioned with fine grass or other soft materials. The American robin builds a new nest for each brood; in northern areas the nest for the first clutch will usually be located in an evergreen tree or shrub, while later broods are raised in deciduous trees. The species is not shy about nesting close to human habitations.

A clutch consists of three to five cyan-colored eggs, and is incubated by the female alone. The eggs hatch after 14 days, and the chicks leave the nest a further two weeks later. The altricial chicks are naked and have their eyes closed for the first few days after hatching.

The chicks are fed earthworms, insects, and berries. Waste accumulation does not occur in the nest because the adults collect and take it away. Chicks are fed, and then raise tails for elimination of waste, a solid white clump that is collected by a parent prior to flying off. All chicks in the brood leave the nest within two days of each other. Juveniles become capable of sustained flight two weeks after fledging. Chicks become sexually mature at one year of age. Bird banders have found that only 25% of young robins survive their first year. The longest known lifespan of an American robin in the wild is 14 years; the average lifespan is about two years.

=== Vocalization ===
Calls: 'scold' call at beginning & 'alarm' call at 42^{s} (very end)

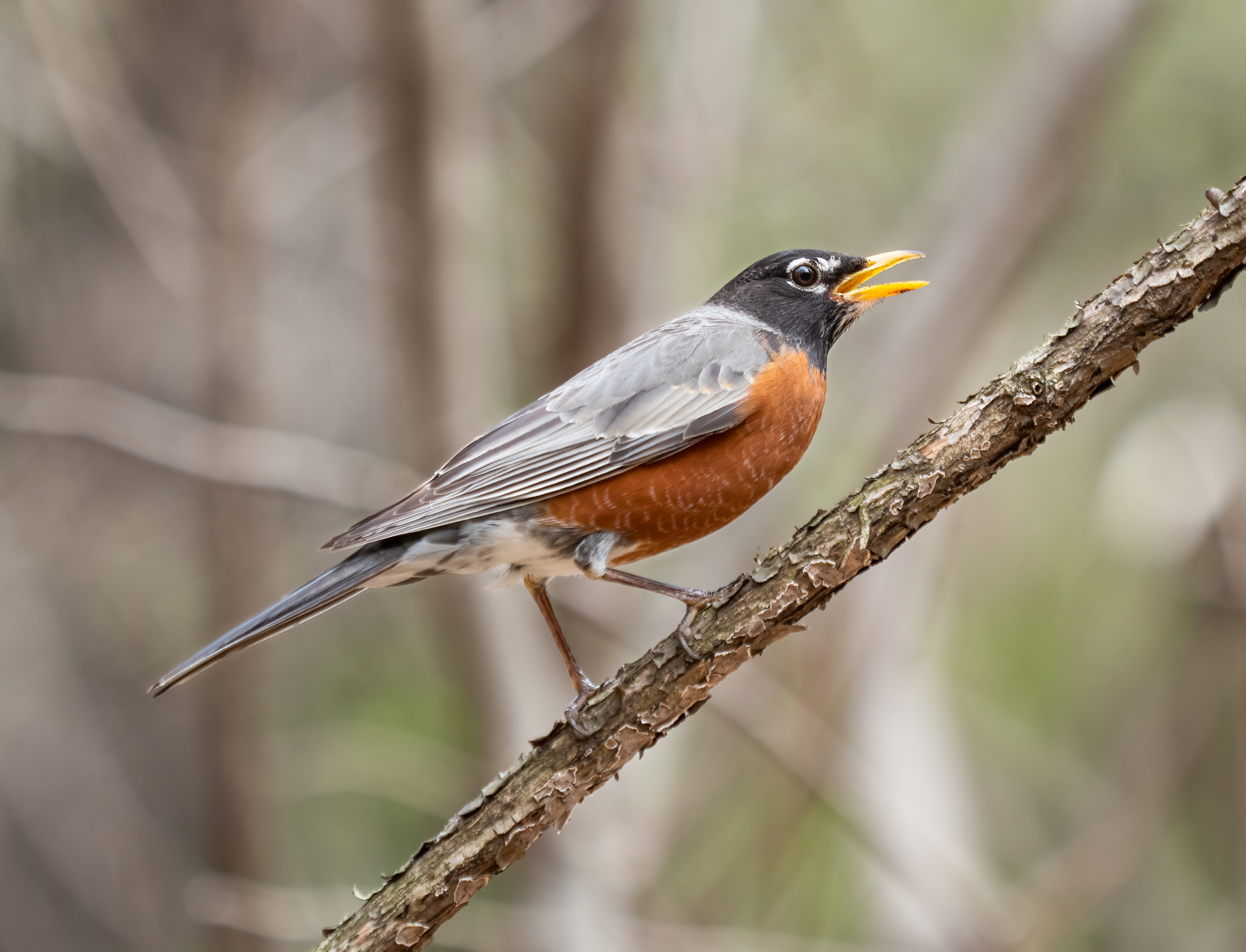
An adult while making an alarm call

The male, as with many thrushes, has a complex and almost continuous song. It is commonly described as a cheery carol, made up of discrete units, often repeated, and spliced together into a string with brief pauses in between. The song varies regionally, and its style varies by the time of day. The song period is from late February or early March to late July or early August; some birds, particularly in the east, sing occasionally into September or later. They are often among the first songbirds to sing as dawn rises or hours before, and last as evening sets in. It usually sings from a high perch in a tree. The song of the San Lucas subspecies (T. m. confinis) is weaker than that of the eastern subspecies (T. m. migratorius), and lacks any clear notes.

In addition to its song, the species has a number of calls used for communicating specific information, such as when a ground predator approaches and when a nest or another American robin is being directly threatened. Even during nesting season, when they exhibit mostly competitive and territorial behavior, they may still band together to drive away a predator.

== Conservation status ==
The species has an extensive range, estimated at 16,000,000 km^{2} (6,200,000 sq mi), and a large population of about 370 million individuals. The western subspecies (T. m. propinquus) in central California is considered to be expanding its range, as is likely the case elsewhere in the United States. It is threatened by climate change and severe weather, but the population trend appears to be stable, and the species does not approach the vulnerable species thresholds under the population trend criterion (>30% decline over ten years or three generations), and therefore International Union for Conservation of Nature evaluated it as least concern. At one point, the bird was killed for its meat, but it is now protected throughout its range in the United States by the Migratory Bird Treaty Act.

== In culture ==
The American robin is the state bird of Connecticut, Michigan, and Wisconsin. It was depicted on the 1986 Birds of Canada series Canadian $2 note (this note was subsequently withdrawn.) It has a place in Native American mythology. The story of how the robin got its red breast by fanning the dying flames of a campfire to save a Native American man and a boy is similar to those that surround the European robin. The Tlingit people of northwestern North America held it to be a culture hero created by Raven to please the people with its song. The Peace Bridge robins were a family of American robins that attracted minor publicity in the mid-1930s for their prominent nest on the Canadian side of the Peace Bridge connecting Buffalo, New York, to Fort Erie, Ontario.

American popular songs featuring this bird include "When the Red, Red Robin (Comes Bob, Bob, Bobbin' Along)", written by Harry M. Woods. Although the comic book superhero Robin was inspired by an N. C. Wyeth illustration of Robin Hood, a later version had his mother nicknaming him Robin because he was born on the first day of spring.

The species is considered a symbol of spring. A well-known example is a poem by Emily Dickinson titled "I Dreaded That First Robin So". Among other 19th-century poems about the first robin of spring is "The First Robin" by William Henry Drummond, which, according to the author's wife, is based on a Quebec superstition that whoever sees the first robin of spring will have good luck. The association has continued down to the present day, as, for example, in one Calvin and Hobbes cartoon from 1990 that had Calvin celebrating his inevitable wealth and fame after seeing the first robin of spring. The harbinger of spring sobriquet is borne out by the fact that American robins tend to follow the 3 °C (37 °F) average temperature isotherm north in spring, but also south in fall. In a study of 209 psychology students at the University of California, Berkeley, Eleanor Rosch found that the robin was, in the students' minds, the most prototypical example of a bird (though the students did not have the opportunity to specify the species of robin). Robin egg blue is a color named after the color of the bird's eggs.

== Gallery ==
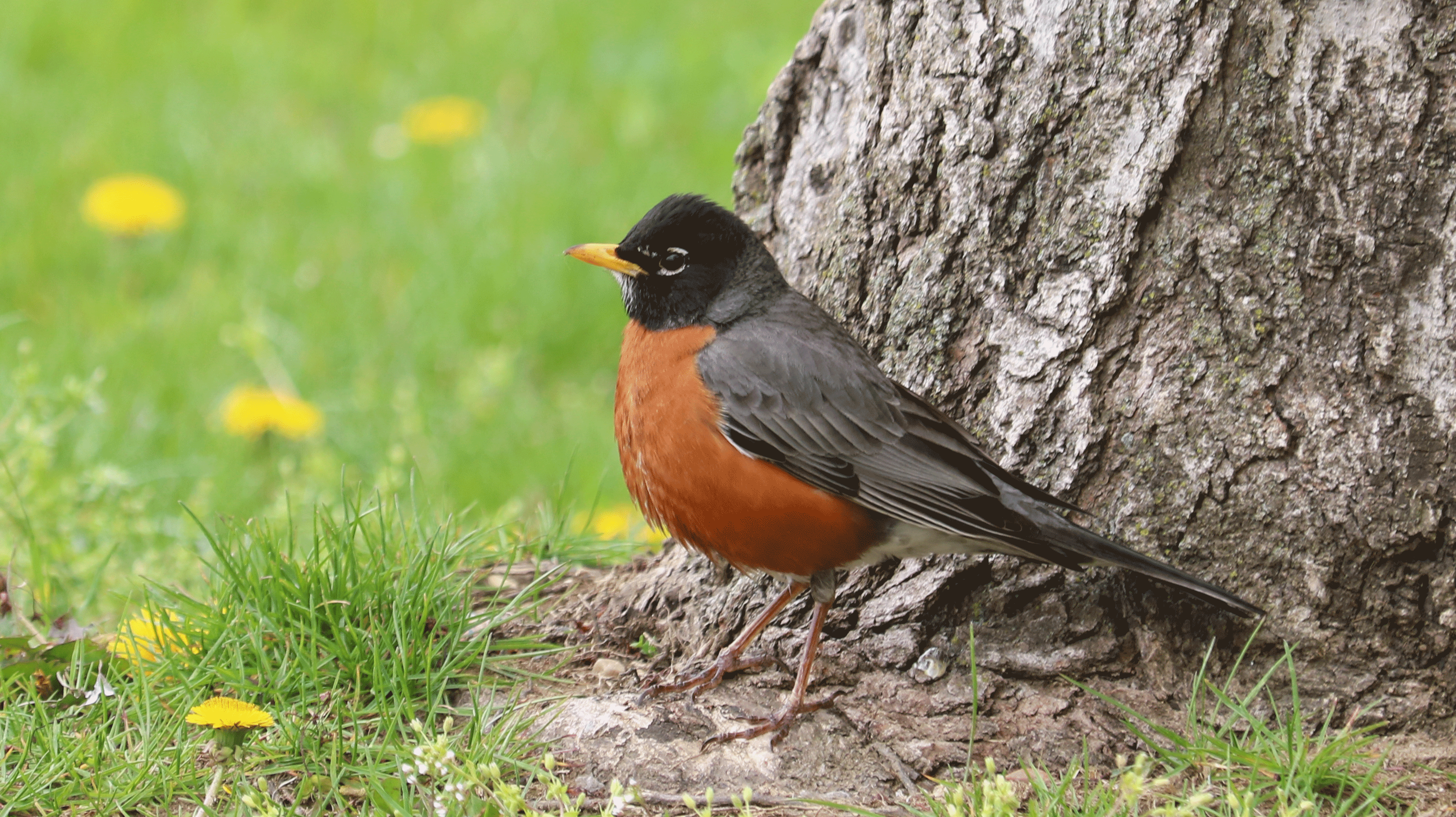
Fluffed-up American robin

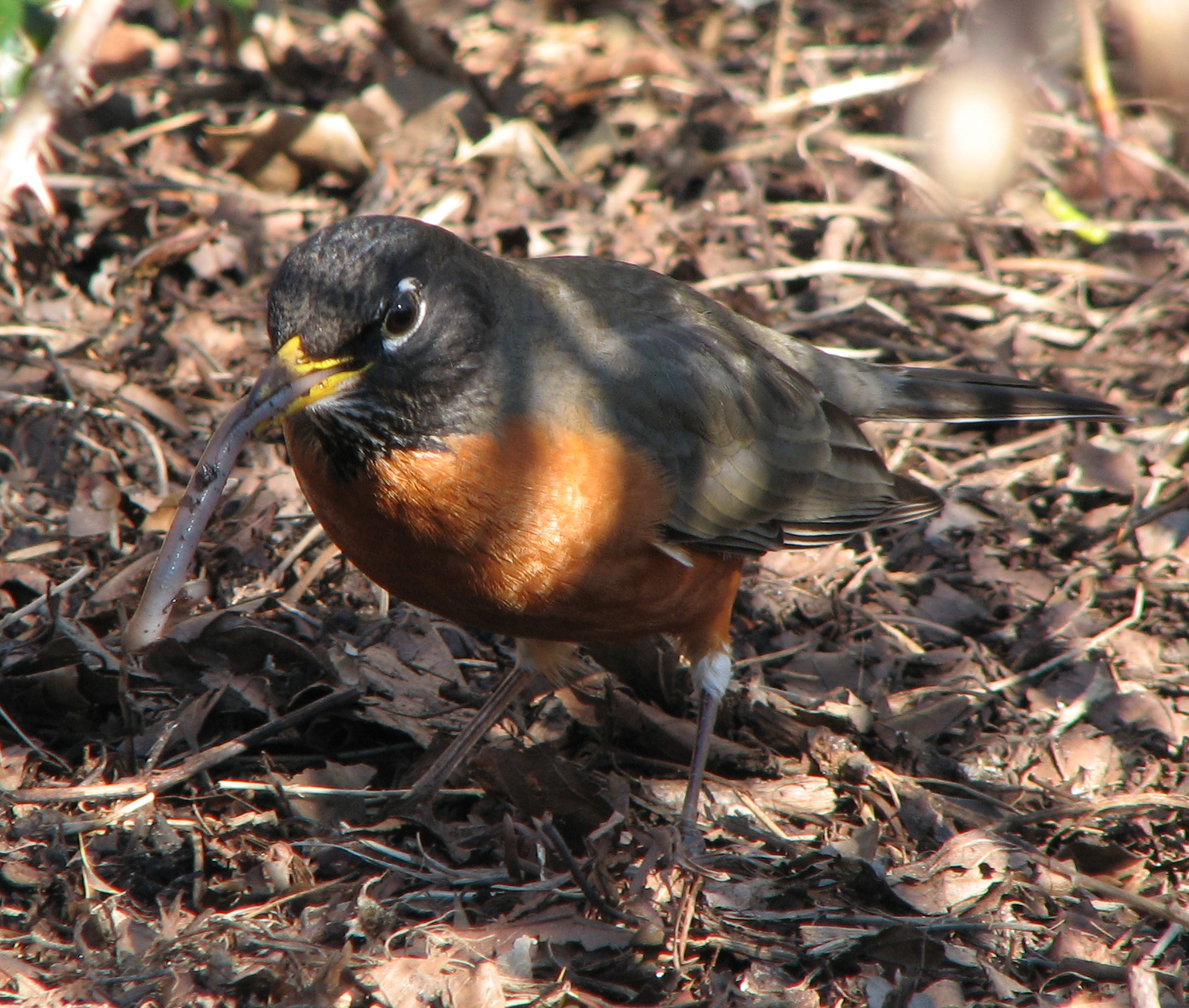
Eating an earthworm

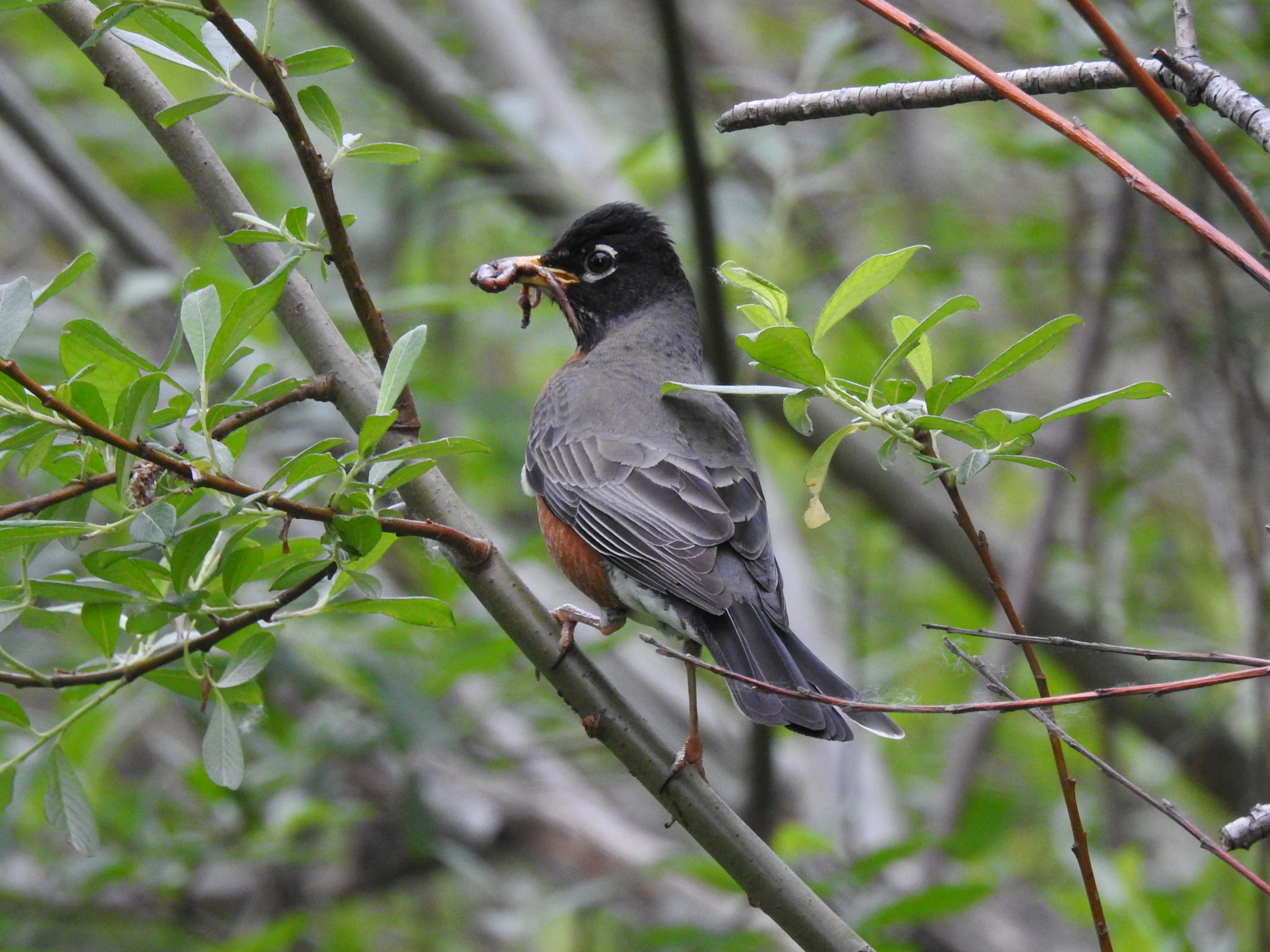
Male carrying an earthworm

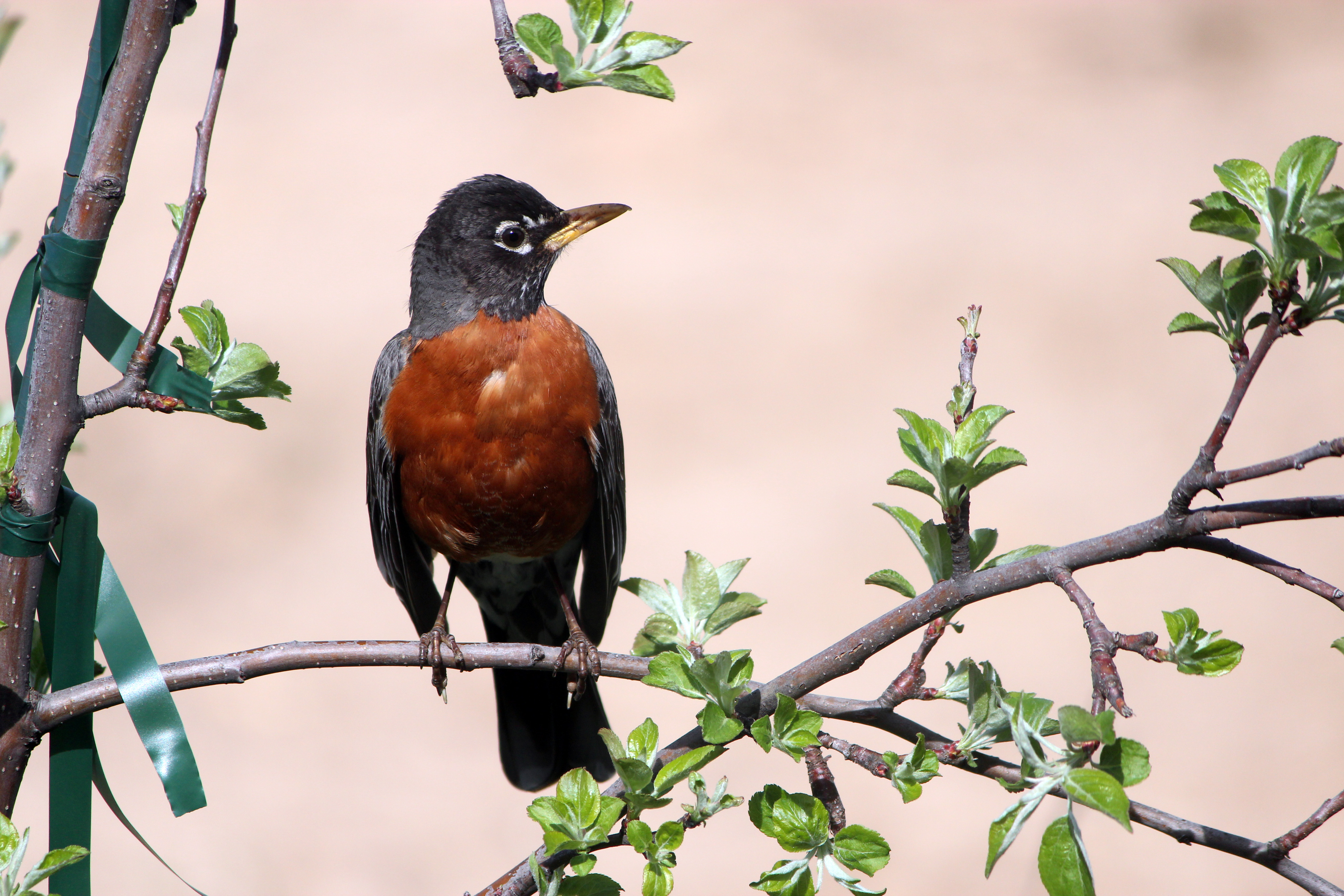
Perching in a tree

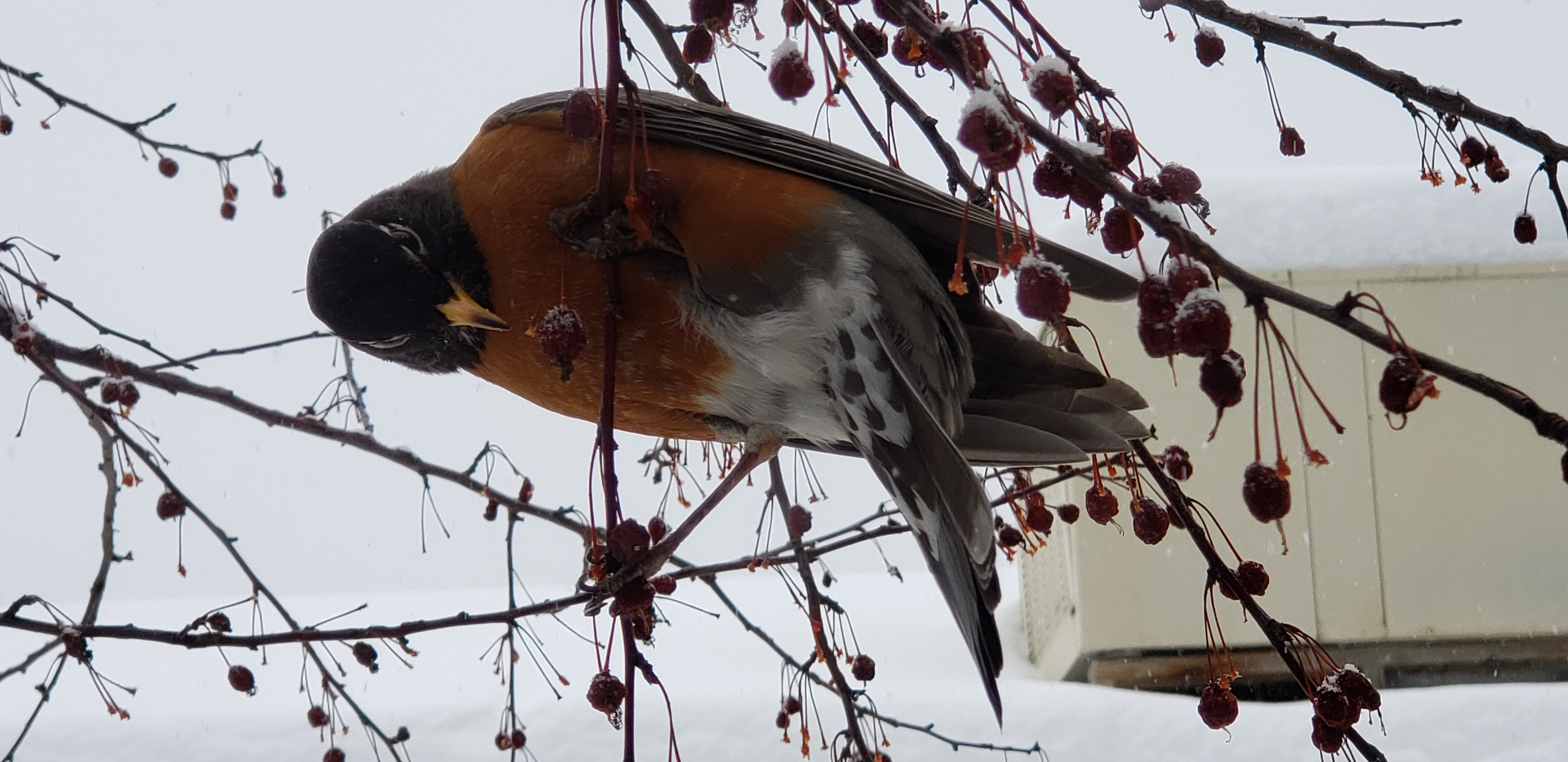
Feeding on crab apples

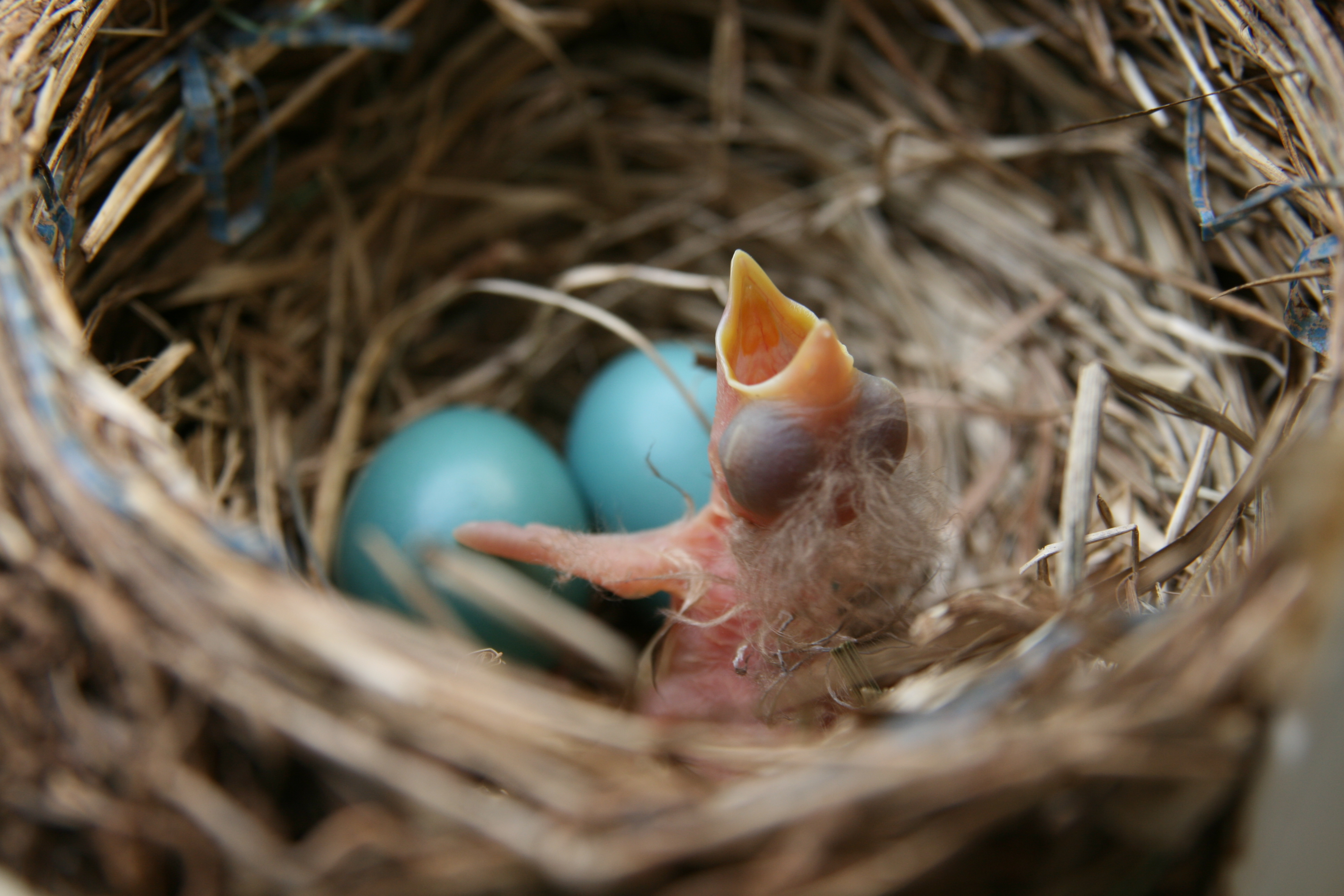
Newly hatched chick among unhatched young

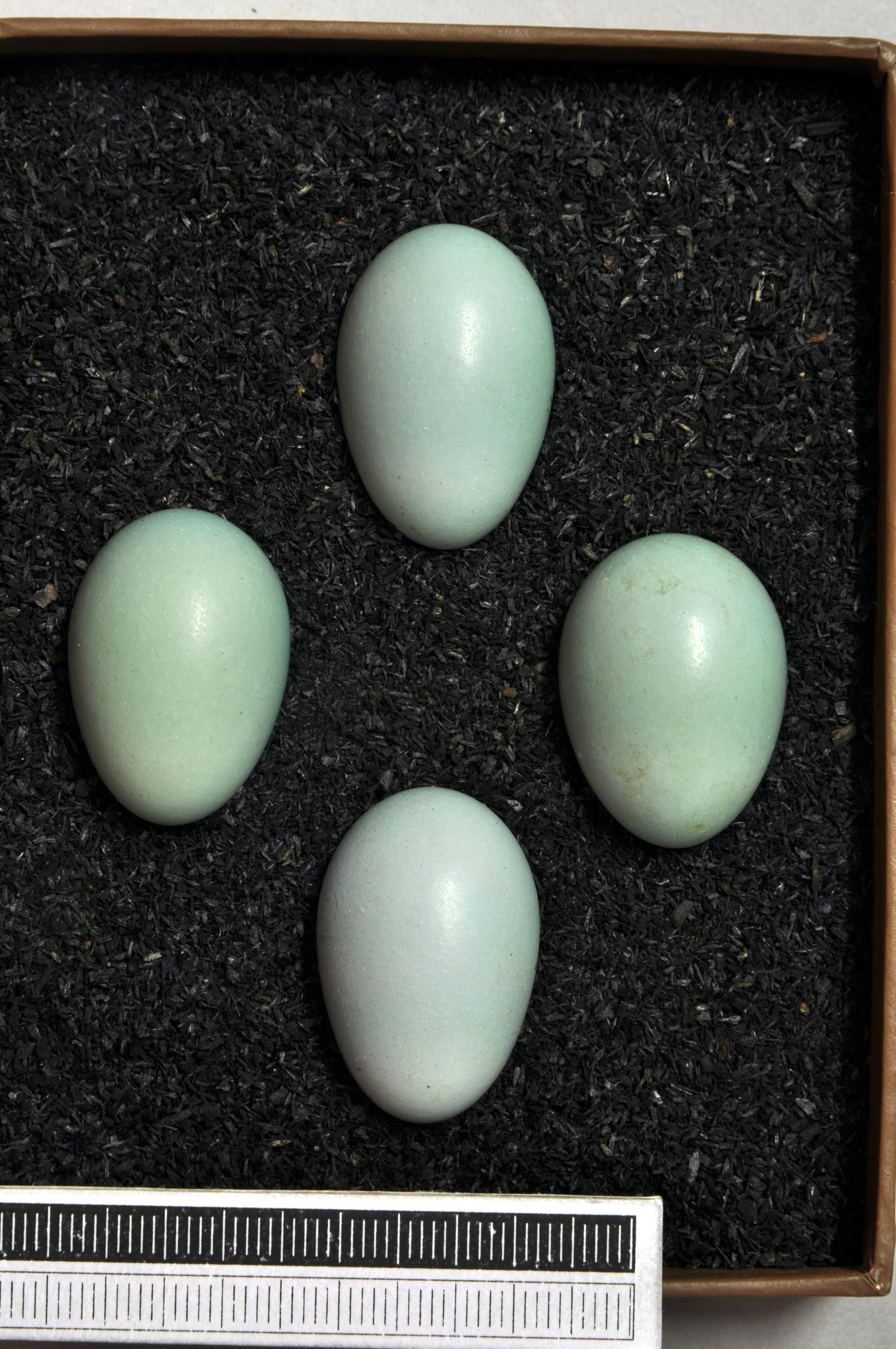
Eggs, Collection Museum Wiesbaden

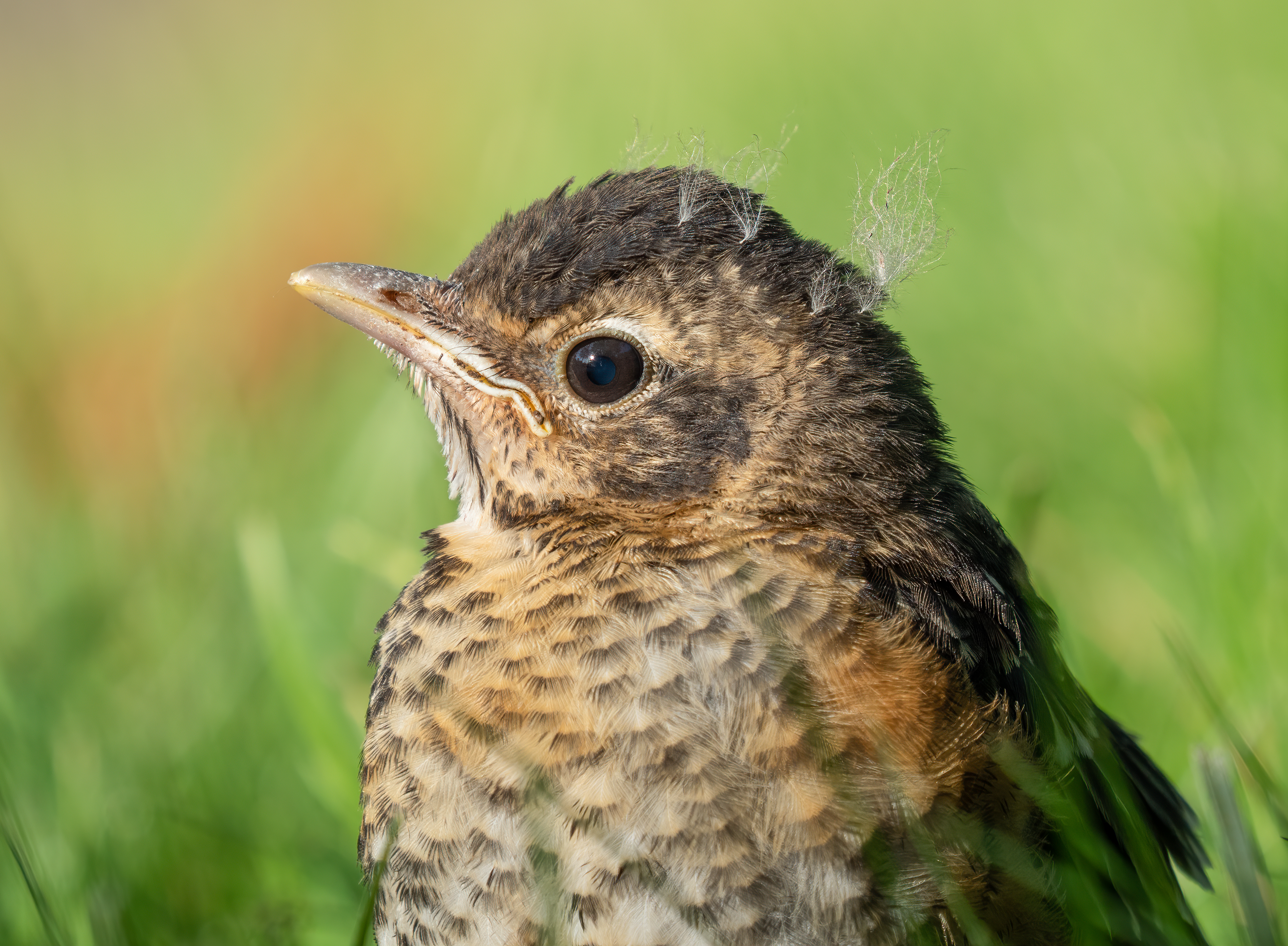
Juvenile in New York

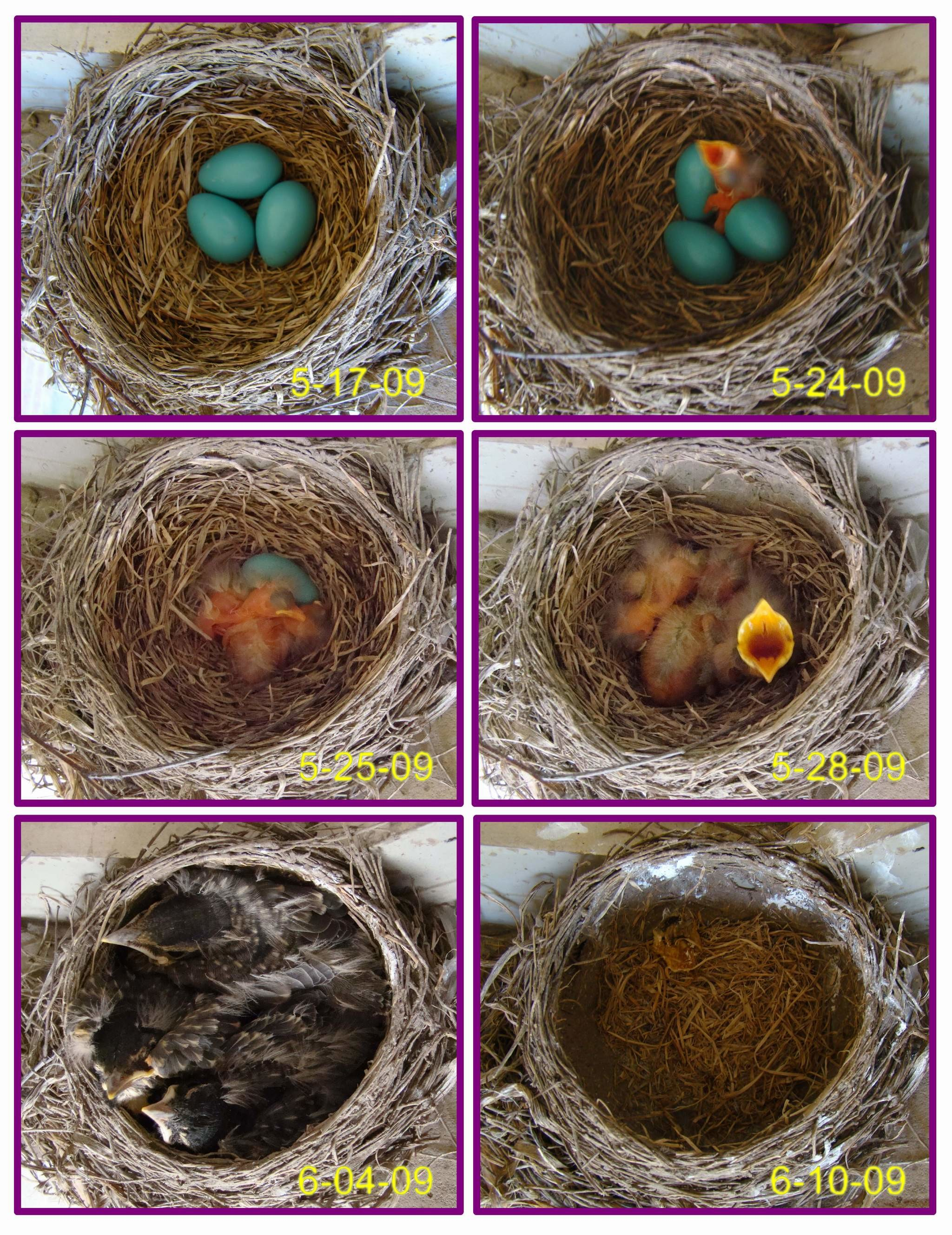
Sequence of dated images showing the progress from eggs to fledging in three weeks

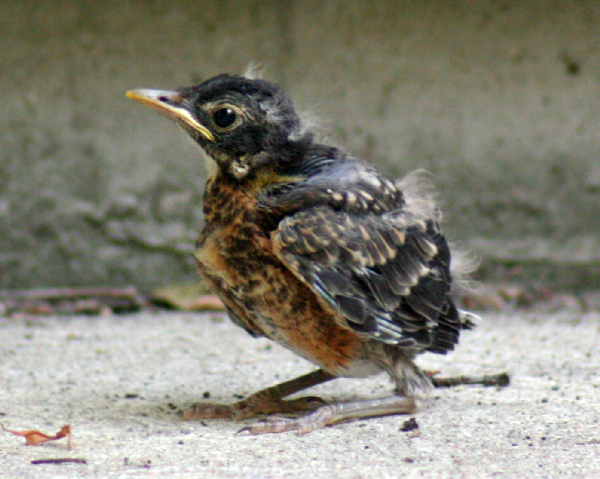
Chick

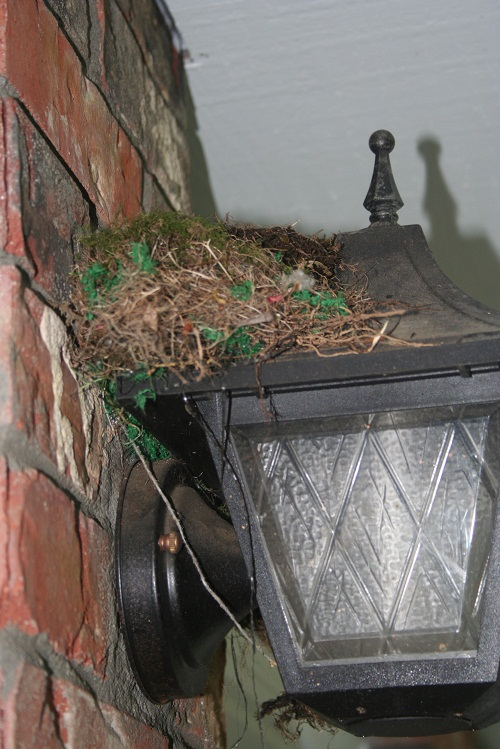
Nest amidst human habitat

== See also ==
- Australasian robins of the genus Petroica
