= Mammomonogamus =

Scientific classification
- Kingdom: Animalia
- Phylum: Nematoda
- Class: Chromadorea
- Order: Rhabditida
- Family: Syngamidae
- Genus: Mammomonogamus
- Species: M. laryngeus

Binomial name
- Mammomonogamus laryngeus Ryzhikovk, 1948

Genus of roundworms

Mammomonogamus is a genus of parasitic nematodes of the family Syngamidae that parasitise the respiratory tracts of cattle, sheep, goats, deer, cats, orangutans, and elephants. The nematodes can also infect humans and cause the disease called mammomonogamiasis. Several known species fall under the genus Mammomonogamus, but the most common species found to infest humans is M. laryngeus. Infection in humans is very rare, with only about 100 reported cases worldwide, and is assumed to be largely accidental. Cases have been reported from the Caribbean, China, Korea, Thailand, and Philippines.

The worm usually inhabits the upper-respiratory region in the trachea, bronchus, or larynx, and can elicit chronic coughing and asthma-like symptoms. One interesting case from Thailand reported finding worms in the patient's duodenum, suggesting M. laryngeus can also be a gastrointestinal parasite. More research is needed because the life cycle is not completely known. Diagnosis is made by recovering the worms on bronchoscopy or oesophagogastroduodenoscopy. Due to the scant amount of information available on this parasite in literature, increased awareness is necessary, especially in endemic areas near M. laryngeus’ reservoir hosts, for clinicians, the local population in the endemic area, and traveling tourists, to effectively recognize and prevent mammomonogamiasis.

== Taxonomic classification ==
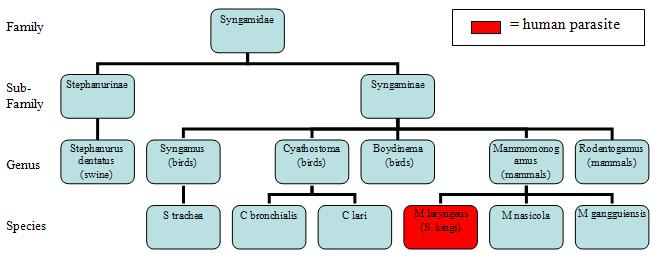
Taxonomic family tree of Mammomonogamus

Mammomonogamus is classified in the family Syngamidae. The Syngamidae are in the superfamily Strongyloidae and order Strongylata, making them close relatives to hookworms and other nematodes.

The generic name Mammomonogamus is derived from the Latin term mamma ('breast'), and the Greek terms monos (μόνος 'single') and gamos (γάμος 'marriage'), which most likely is referring to the distinct characteristic of the male and female worm acting as a single unit through the male being joined in permanent copulation to the middle portion of the female's body.

Species within this genus are M. laryngeus, M. nasicola, M. gangguiensis, and M. auris. Only M. laryngeus is known to infect and cause disease in humans. Because of the close resemblance of M. laryngeus to the gapeworm from the genus Syngamus that commonly infect birds, M. laryngeus was originally called Syngamus laryngeus and Syngamus kingi. The classification was revised in 1948 when Ryzhikov reconstructed the phylogenetic relationship of the family Syngamidae and recategorized the parasite as M. laryngeus.

Infestation with M. laryngeus has been called mammomonogamiasis, mammomonogamosis, syngamosis', or 'syngamiasis.

== History ==
The parasite in this genus of greatest significance to humans is M. laryngeus, due to the occasional, incidental cases reported in humans. While M. laryngeus commonly infects domestic ungulates and ruminants, the first reported case of a human infection was by Dr. King, who diagnosed the parasite in a woman from St. Lucia, Antilles. The next case originated in Brazil in the 1920s, where the connection with bovine species was confirmed.

== Morphology ==
The most distinct feature of M. laryngeus is the “Y” shape formed when the male is joined to the female in copula. The smaller male uses its posterior bursa to attach to the female vulva located on the side near the middle of the female worm. The adult worms usually remain permanently joined in this “Y” formation as they settle on the mucosal epithelium of the larynx, trachea, or bronchi.

Adult M. laryngeus worms are red to reddish-brown in color due to their hemophagous nature. They possess spicules ranging from 23-30 μm in length and cup-shaped buccal capsules (mouths) that open at the anterior end. Located deep in the buccal cavity are eight to 10 teeth that are not thought to be used for attachment.

The adult male is about half the length of the female. Case reports have found male worms ranging from 3–6.3 mm in length and 360-380 μm in width. The larger females were reported to be 8.7-23.5 mm long and 550-570 μm wide. The female also has a pointed posterior end with a long or short tail. The female while in copula lays many ellipsoid-shaped eggs that are about 40 x 80 μm in size, not operculated, and usually possess thicker shells than hookworm eggs.

== Life cycle ==
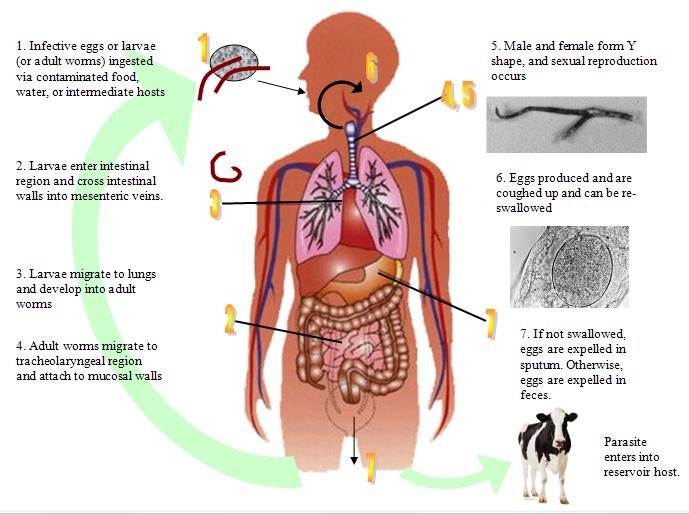
Hypothesized lifecycle of Mammomonogamus laryngeus

Although the complete lifecycle of M. laryngeus is not fully known due to the rareness of the parasite in humans, the parasite is thought to adopt a lifecycle similar to Syngamus trachea, the common gapeworm infection in birds that was initially thought to be mammomonogamiasis. Currently, two existing hypotheses may help aid medical diagnostics, especially in endemic areas such as the tropics, the Caribbean, and Brazil.

Hypothesis #1: Infection initially begins by the ingestion of foods, water, or intermediate hosts contaminated by adult worms. The infective adults migrate to the larynx or trachea and attach to the mucosal walls. Sexual reproduction occurs here, and the females begin to lay eggs in the upper respiratory region. Eggs do not develop at body temperature, and are expelled in sputum or reswallowed and excreted in feces.

Hypothesis #2: The infective agent may be embryonated eggs or infective larvae, and infection is due to ingestion of contaminated food, water, or intermediate hosts. As larvae are released into the intestinal area, they can burrow through intestinal walls, travel into the mesenteric veins, and migrate to the alveoli. Here, they undergo a pulmonary cycle, where the larvae develop into adult worms in a process that may take seven days. After reaching adulthood, M. laryngeus migrates upwards to the trachea, larynx, or bronchi, where sexual reproduction occurs. Egg production begins about three weeks later, and eggs are coughed up and expelled in sputum, or excreted in feces. Larvae may hatch from embryonated eggs outside of the mammalian host.

More research is needed to fully elucidate the lifecycle, but both larvae and adults appear to be infective. One recent case reported finding adult worms in the duodenum, which is the first presentation of adult worms not in the upper respiratory region. The adult worms might have been coughed up and reswallowed before settling in the duodenum. The development from larvae to adults is about three weeks, but the existence of a larval pulmonary cycle is uncertain. Intermediate hosts, although not fully known, may be earthworms (an intermediate host for the genus Syngamus), snails, or arthropods. Other than intermediate hosts, no mention of other biological or mechanical vectors has been made.

== Symptoms of infection in humans ==
Symptoms usually began to appear six to 11 days after initial infection, beginning with a fever and cough. Most cases reported a progression to a persistent cough, leading to expectoration and sometimes hemoptysis. Worms in the bronchial region can trigger a chronic, nonproductive cough and asthma-like symptoms due to the obstruction of airways by the worms. These symptoms, along with a low-grade fever, can last several months if not initially diagnosed correctly. A scratching or crawling sensation can be felt in the throat if the worms are attached in the larynx. Weight loss and pneumonitis have been reported as possible long-term consequences, but not anemia.

Recently, M. laryngeus worms were found in the duodenum of a Thai patient, which was the first gastrointestinal case of ammomonogamiasis. The patient complained of chest pain, haematemesia, melaena, and abdominal bloating, but no respiratory symptoms. Although nothing conclusive was determined, the adult worms perhaps were dislodged from the larynx, reswallowed, and later found in the duodenum.

== Pathogenesis ==
Little is known about how M. laryngeus causes disease. Symptoms do not arise until the worms have reached the adult stage and obstruct the bronchial airways leading to asthma-like symptoms and coughing. Similar symptoms are seen in humans, as well as the domestic ungulates and ruminant hosts. Bronchial inflammation or hemotypsis may occur due to the worms attaching to the mucosal walls and ingesting red blood cells.

The incubation period is usually six to 11 days after infection. This supports the second hypothesis of a possible pulmonary cycle that explains the one- to two-week delay in the presentation of symptoms.

Eosinophilia is not a reliable measure of extent of infection because it varies from individual to individual. Some cases with multiple pairs of worms have reported low eosinophil levels, while other cases with a single pair had very high eosinophil counts. Such variation may be due to the lack of host tissue invasion by the parasite, since M. laryngeus attaches to the mucosal epithelium in the tracheolaryngeal region. A singular case even found worms within a cyst.

Past cases have demonstrated that simple removal of the worms from upper respiratory area led to a cessation of symptoms and was a sufficient cure with or without antihelmintics. No lasting pathological tissue damage was reported.

Thus far, no reinfection mechanism for M. laryngeus has been posited, so all adult worms found inside a human must be the result of ingested embryonated eggs, larvae, or adult worms. Most of the time, only one pair of worms is found, but occasionally, the patient may have multiple pairs that must all be removed.

== Diagnosis ==
The definitive diagnosis is the recovery of adult worms either by coughing them up or removing them with forceps, a bronchoscope, or endoscopic instruments. However, worms might be difficult to remove if firmly attached to the bronchial walls. Finding M. laryngeus eggs in the sputum or feces is another sure sign of infection.

The eggs closely resemble hookworm eggs, but Mammomonogamus eggs have a much thicker shell.

== Treatment ==
Mammomonogamiasis is relatively easy to treat. Manual or bronchoscopic removal of worms has been successful. One case followed up with aspiration. Although no controlled study on the efficacy of antihelmintics in treating mammomonogamiasis has been conducted, most patients were given albendazole, mebendazole or thiabendazole with no adverse effects. Patients given albendazole were instructed to take 400 mg for three days or if given a combination of drugs, albendazole is given 200 mg, three times a day for three days, with mebendazole at 100 mg, three times a day for three days. The drug regimens ranged from 200–3000 mg/day for three to 20 days.

== Epidemiology ==
Mammomonogamiasis is a very rare human infection yet a common veterinary parasite. Only 100 human cases of M. laryngeus have been reported, thus far. Its reservoir hosts are largely in tropical regions, most commonly the domestic cattle, cats, orangutans, and other ruminants and ungulates. Therefore, humans are accidental hosts, where infections are most likely to due close exposure to bovine or feline species.

While the complete life cycle is still not fully known, transmission is thought to be oral-fecal, where infection comes from ingesting contaminated food or water containing embryonated eggs, hatched larvae, or intermediate hosts. Possible intermediate host candidates include earthworms, snails, and arthropods. Eggs are expelled in sputum or feces. Most often, travelers to tropical climate places become exposed to contaminated sources and are diagnosed upon return to their country. The best preventative measure is to ensure proper food preparation and water sanitation.

From the numerous case reports, endemic areas include Martinique, Brazil, Puerto Rico, Dominica, Santa Lucia, Trinidad, Guyana, Guadeloupe, India, tropic regions in Africa, Malaysia, the Philippines, Vietnam, China, Korea, and Thailand.

Due to the frequency of travelers contracting this disease, countries such as Australia, Canada, United States, UK, France have reported cases, although these countries are not considered to be endemic for the parasite.

== Public health ==
Mammomonogamiasis is not considered an emerging disease because of the rarity of cases. Consequently, no control measures are currently being implemented. Very little information about this disease can be found in literature, so physicians especially in endemic areas should be aware of the parasitic disease, the clinical presentations, and treatment for humans.
