= Mammomonogamus auris =

Scientific classification
- Domain: Eukaryota
- Kingdom: Animalia
- Phylum: Nematoda
- Class: Chromadorea
- Order: Rhabditida
- Family: Syngamidae
- Genus: Mammomonogamus
- Species: M. auris

Binomial name
- Mammomonogamus auris (Faust & Tang, 1934)

Species of roundworm

Mammomonogamus auris is a free-living nematode has been reported to infect cats. M. auris is a species of nematodes in the family Syngamidae. They are parasites of the nasal sinuses and trachea of mammals.

Cases of M. auris infection have been reported in Asia and Micronesia (Saipan), causing otitis interna.

Treatment involved saline flushing under heavy sedation. Follow-up treatment included topical thiabendazole/dexamethasone/neomycin ointment as well as selamectin.
