= Peace Bridge robins =

Group of American robins

The Peace Bridge robins were a family of American robins that nested for several years in the 1930s on the Canadian side of the Peace Bridge, which connects Buffalo, New York to Fort Erie, Ontario. The robins became a minor tourist attraction for visitors to the area in 1935 after spending 15 days in a futile attempt to build a nest on a narrow ledge at the Canadian immigration office adjacent to the bridge. Only after officials widened the ledge did the robins successfully nest and thereupon returned to the spot for several years afterward. The robins were featured in postcards and were somewhat tamed by frequent feedings from government workers.

== See also ==
- List of individual birds
