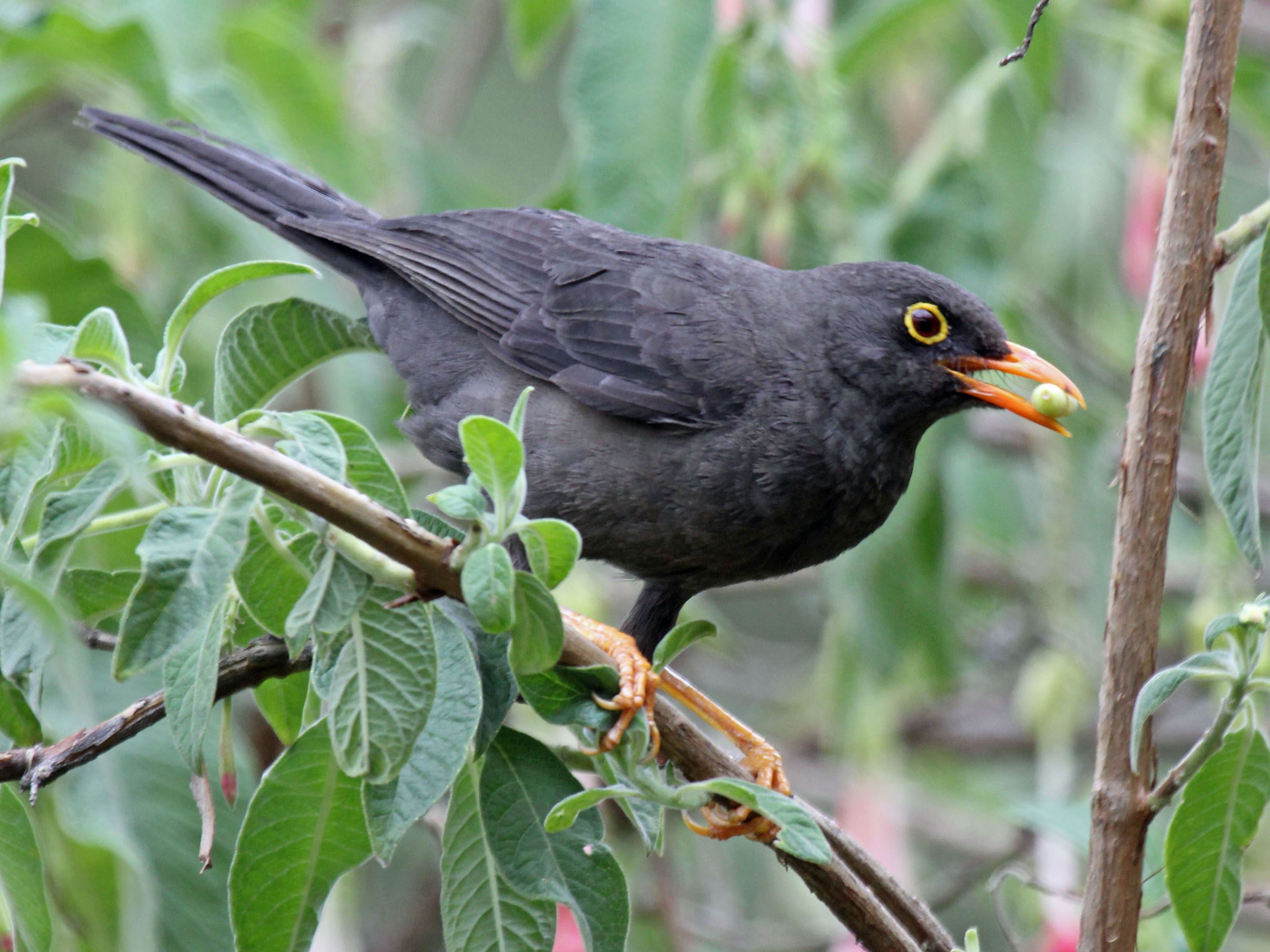
- In Quito, Ecuador

Conservation status
- Least Concern (IUCN 3.1)

Scientific classification
- Kingdom: Animalia
- Phylum: Chordata
- Class: Aves
- Order: Passeriformes
- Family: Turdidae
- Genus: Turdus
- Species: T. serranus

Binomial name
- Turdus serranus Tschudi, 1844

= Glossy-black thrush =

Species of bird

The glossy-black thrush (Turdus serranus) is a species of bird in the family Turdidae. It is found from Venezuela to Argentina.

== Taxonomy and systematics ==
The glossy-black thrush was originally described with its current binomial Turdus serranus. Its further taxonomy is unsettled. The IOC, AviList, and the Clements taxonomy assign it these five subspecies:

- T. s. cumanensis (Hellmayr, 1919)
- T. s. atrosericeus (Lafresnaye, 1848)
- T. s. fuscobrunneus (Chapman, 1912)
- T. s. serranus Tschudi, 1844
- T. s. continoi Fraga & Dickinson, 2008

However, as of late 2025, BirdLife International's Handbook of the Birds of the World did not recognize T. s. continoi, including it within T. s. serranus.

Subspecies T. s. continoi had originally been named T. s. unicolor in 1970. Because T. unicolor had been previously assigned to Tickell's thrush, by the principle of priority Fraga and Dickinson proposed its current subspecific epithet.

What is now the black thrush (T. infuscatus) was previously treated as another subspecies of T. serranus, but molecular studies in the early 2000s determined that they are separate species and not closely related.

This article follows the five-subspecies model.

== Description ==
The glossy-black thrush is 23 to 25 cm (9.1 to 9.8 in) long and weighs 70 to 90 g (2.5 to 3.2 oz). The species is sexually dimorphic. Adult males of the nominate subspecies T. s. serranus are almost entirely glossy black with a yellow eye-ring and a yellow bill. Adult females have a dark olive-brown head and upperparts, slightly paler and redder underparts, a brownish bill, and no eye-ring. Both sexes have yellow legs and feet. Juvenile males have dark sooty brown upperparts and juvenile females have warm brown upperparts, both with buff spots and streaks. Both have mottled buff and dark underparts.

Subspecies T. s. cumanensis males are dark chocolate-brown with rufous-brown edges on their wing feathers. Females have medium brown upperparts and deep sooty-gray underparts. Males of T. s. atrosericeus are like the nominate; females have pale olive-brown upperparts and grayish brown underparts. Males of T. s. fuscobrunneus are also like the nominate; females are uniform dark brown with a thin orange-yellow eye-ring. T. s. continoi is very like T. s. fuscobrunneus.

== Distribution and habitat ==
The subspecies of the glossy-black thrush are found thus:

- T. s. cumanensis: mountains of northeastern Venezuela's Anzoátegui, Sucre, and Monagas states
- T. s. atrosericeus: Venezuelan Coastal Range from Carabobo to Miranda, Serranía de Perijá on the Venezuelan-Colombia border, and Andes from Lara in Venezuela south into Colombia's Eastern Andes
- T. s. fuscobrunneus: Colombia's Central and Western Andes and south on both slopes of the Andes through Ecuador and on the western slope slightly into northwestern Peru
- T. s. serranus: eastern slope of the Andes from San Martín Department in northern Peru south through Bolivia
- T. s. continoi: northwestern Argentina's Jujuy and Salta provinces

The glossy-black thrush primarily inhabits the interior of a variety of landscapes in the subtropical and temperate zones, most of which are humid to wet. These include montane forest, cloudforest, and mature secondary forest. It is also found in dry forest in northwestern Peru. In Venezuela it ranges in elevation between 950 and 2,900 m (3,100 and 9,500 ft), in Colombia between 1,400 and 3,000 m (4,600 and 9,800 ft), and in Ecuador mostly between 1,500 and 2,800 m (4,900 and 9,200 ft). In northwestern Peru it is found between 1,200 and 2,900 m (3,900 and 9,500 ft) and on the eastern slope between 1,400 and 3,450 m (4,600 and 11,300 ft) but mostly between 1,800 and 3,000 m (5,900 and 9,800 ft).

== Behavior ==
=== Movement ===
The glossy-black thrush is mostly a sedentary year-round resident though some elevational movements have been noted in Colombia, Ecuador, and Venezuela.

=== Feeding ===
The glossy-black thrush feeds on fruits and berries. It is almost entirely arboreal, very seldom found on the ground. It typically forages from the forest's mid-story to its canopy. It regularly gathers in fruiting trees with small groups of the same and other species but only rarely joins mixed-species feeding flocks.

=== Breeding ===
The glossy-black thrush's breeding seasons have not been fully defined but span March to August in Colombia. It includes February and June in Ecuador, July and August in Peru, and September in Bolivia. The one known nest was a cup made from mosses near the ground in a vine tangle on a tree. It contained two eggs that were pale blue with light brown and purple spots. Nothing else is known about the species' breeding biology.

=== Vocalization ===
The glossy-black thrush sings mostly before dawn, usually from an exposed perch in the forest canopy. Its song is unmusical, "a rapidly mumbled te-do-de-de-do-deet, all notes run together, rather shrill, gradually rising throughout, and monotonously repeated at short intervals". Another author similarly describes it as "uninspired, a short and tirelessly repeated phrase that rises toward [the] end, e.g. tee-do-do-eét?". Its calls include "tjick tjick tji-tji-tji in flight, rasping rrrrrt-rrrrrt in agitation at dusk, and kip-kip or cop-cop-kip-kip in alarm".

== Status ==
The IUCN has assessed the glossy-black thrush as being of Least Concern. It has a large range; its population size is not known and is believed to be decreasing. No immediate threats have been identified. It is considered locally common in Venezuela and fairly common in Colombia, Ecuador, and Peru. It is found in at least one national park in most of its countries.
