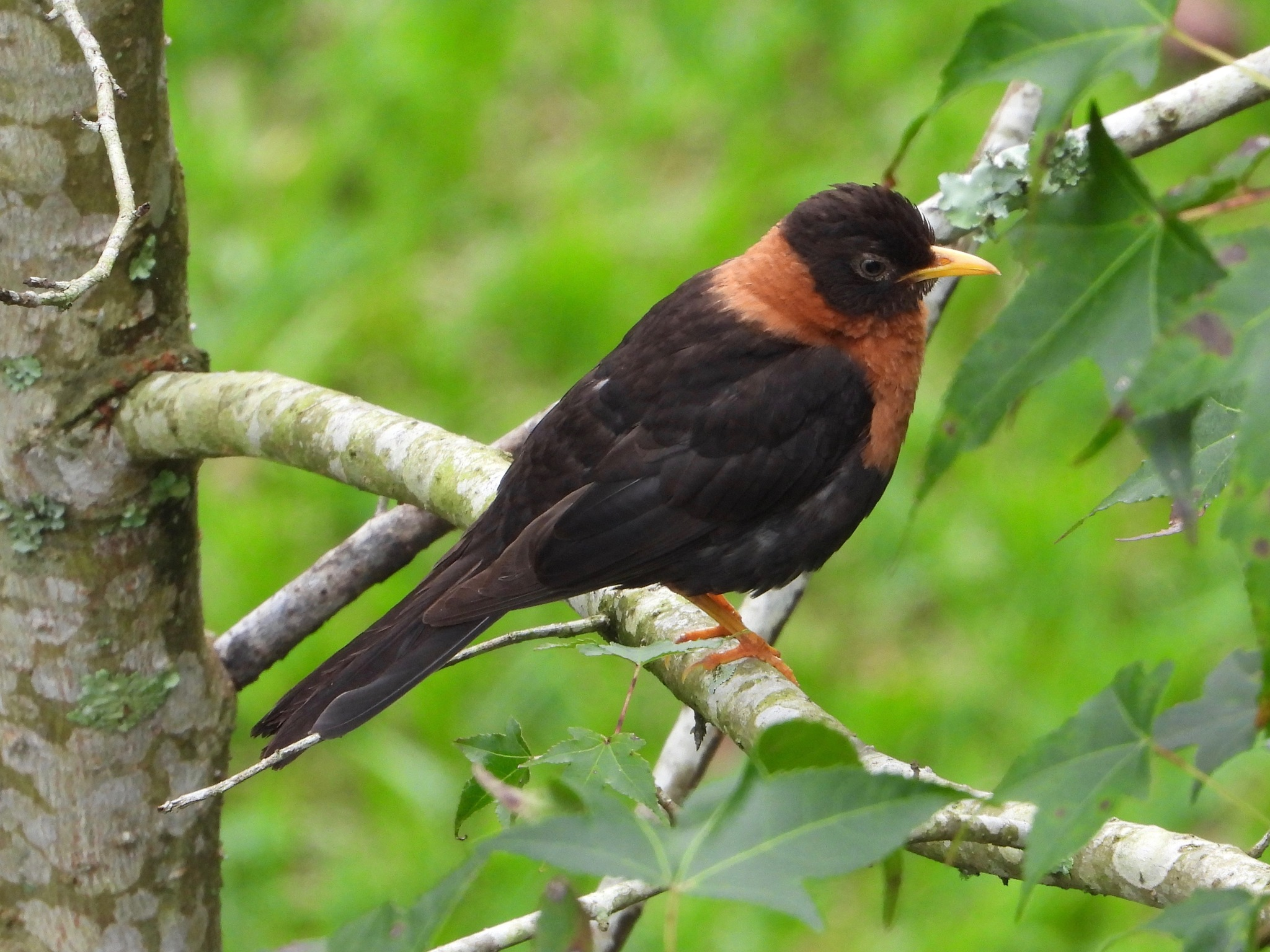
- Male
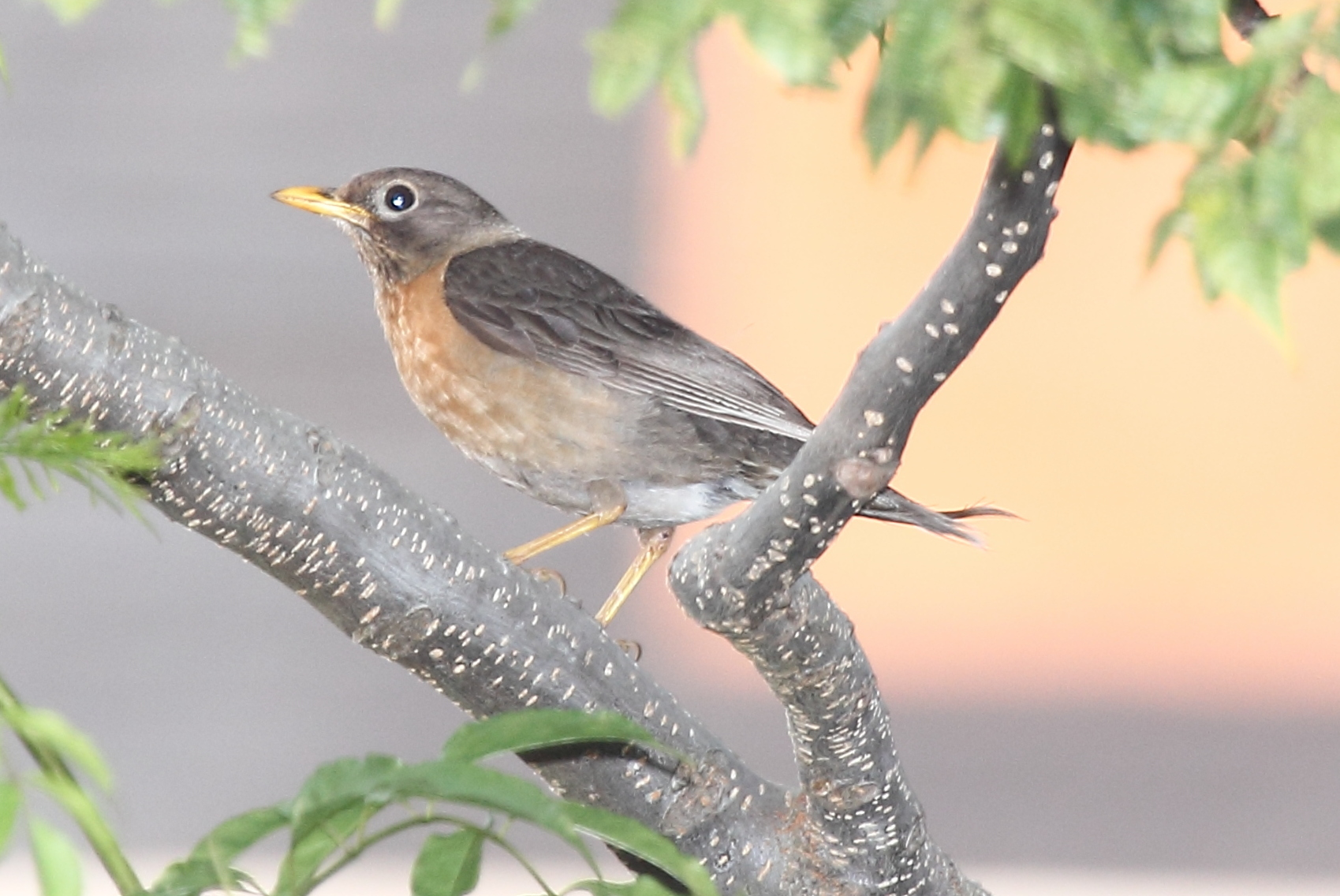
- Female

Conservation status
- Least Concern (IUCN 3.1)

Scientific classification
- Kingdom: Animalia
- Phylum: Chordata
- Class: Aves
- Order: Passeriformes
- Family: Turdidae
- Genus: Turdus
- Species: T. rufitorques

Binomial name
- Turdus rufitorques Hartlaub, 1844

= Rufous-collared thrush =

Species of bird

The rufous-collared thrush (Turdus rufitorques) is a species of bird in the family Turdidae, the thrushes and allies. It is found in El Salvador, Guatemala, Honduras, and Mexico. Some taxonomic systems call it the rufous-collared robin.

== Taxonomy and systematics ==
The rufous-collared thrush was originally described in 1844 as Turdus (Merula) rufitorques.

The rufous-collared thrush is monotypic. Its closest relative appears to be the American robin (T. migratorius); a 2026 genetic study has suggested it may even be genetically embedded within American robin populations.

== Description ==
The rufous-collared thrush is 23 to 25.5 cm (9.1 to 10 in) long; three individuals weighed 70 to 74 g (2.5 to 2.6 oz). The species is sexually dimorphic. Adult males have a mostly black head with a whitish chin and a throat streaked with black and cinnamon-rufous. They have a wide collar of cinnamon-rufous or chestnut-rufous on the nape and sides of the neck that in front extends to include the breast. Their flanks, belly, and undertail coverts are black. Adult females have a pattern similar to the male's but with lighter and duller colors. Their crown is brownish with darker streaks. The rest of their head is mostly grayish brown with a dusky-streaked dull white to dull cinnamon chin and throat. Their upperparts are grayish brown with gray feather edges on the back and rump. Their collar and breast are buffy cinnamon or tawny. Their flanks, belly, and undertail coverts are buffy grayish with white streaks on the coverts. Juveniles have brown upperparts. Their underparts are brownish buff with black or dusky spots. Immature males are similar to adult females with a brighter collar and breast and often a cinnamon wash on the belly. Immature females are like adults but with a less contrasting collar and dusky grayish underparts with little or no cinnamon. Juveniles have a dark brown head and upperparts with cinnamon-buff spots, a whitish throat, and cinnamon-buff underparts with dark brown spots. All ages have a dark brown iris. Adult males have a bright yellow-orange bill, legs, and feet. Immature males have a dull yellow-orange bill, legs, and feet. Adult and immature females a light orange-brown bill, legs, and feet. Juveniles have a dark brown bill with a paler base on the mandible.

== Distribution and habitat ==
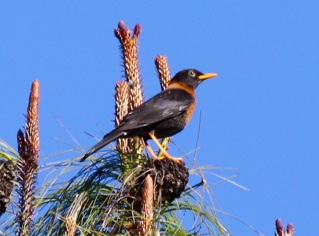
Male rufous-collared thrush in Chiapas, Mexico

The rufous-collared thrush has a disjunct distribution. One population is in the central part of the southern Mexican state of Chiapas. Another extends from southern Chiapas across most of southern Guatemala. A third extends across south-central Honduras and the last is in western El Salvador.

The rufous-collared thrush inhabits primary montane evergreen forest, pine-oak forest, and secondary forest in the subtropical and lower temperate zones. It also occurs in grassy clearings, villages, and urban areas. In elevation it ranges between 1,500 and 3,300 m (4,900 and 10,800 ft).

== Behavior ==
=== Movement ===
The rufous-collared thrush is a year-round resident.

=== Feeding ===
The rufous-collared thrush's diet has not been studied but is assumed to be similar that of the American robin, which is mostly insects with some small fruits. It generally forages alone or with its mate but outside the breeding season may gather in small flocks. It feeds at all levels of the forest from the ground to the canopy.

=== Breeding ===
The rufous-collared thrush's breeding season centers on April and May. It builds a bulky cup of moss, grass, and small roots and sometimes includes mud or cow manure. The clutch is two or three eggs that are unmarked bright blue. The incubation period, time to fledging, and details of parental care are not known.

=== Vocalization ===
The rufous-collared thrush sings from a prominent high perch. Its song is described as "evenly spaced high-pitched warbling whistles and trills...tre'e'e'e'e-chur'e'e'e'e'e'e-We dirt!-Tea'a'a'a-pretty'dirt'pretty'dirt'irt'irt'irt'irt--We'dirt-tseet!-Tea'Tea'ear'ear'ear'ear'ear". Its call is "chut'chut'chut".

== Status ==
The IUCN has assessed the rufous-collared thrush as being of Least Concern. It has a large range; its population size is not known and is believed to be decreasing. No immediate threats have been identified. It is considered fairly common to common overall and fairly common south of Mexico. "Human activity probably has little short term effect on [the] Rufous-collared Robin, which occupies open forests and edge and disturbed habitats, including villages."
