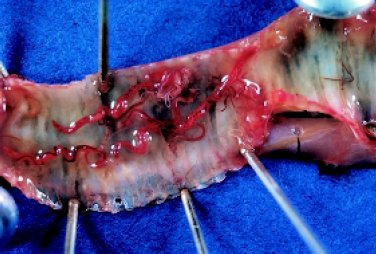
- Syngamus trachea

Scientific classification
- Kingdom: Animalia
- Phylum: Nematoda
- Class: Chromadorea
- Order: Rhabditida
- Family: Syngamidae
- Genus: Syngamus; Siebold, 1836

= Syngamus =

Genus of worms

Syngamus is a genus of nematodes belonging to the family Syngamidae.

The genus has almost cosmopolitan distribution.

Species:

- Syngamus anterogonimus Ryjikov, 1949
- Syngamus gibbocephalus Ryjikov, 1949
- Syngamus merulae Baylis, 1926
- Syngamus microspiculum Skrjabin, 1915
- Syngamus palustris Ryjikov, 1949
- Syngamus taiga Ryjikov, 1949
- Syngamus trachea (Montagu, 1811)
- Syngamus trachealis Siebold, 1836
