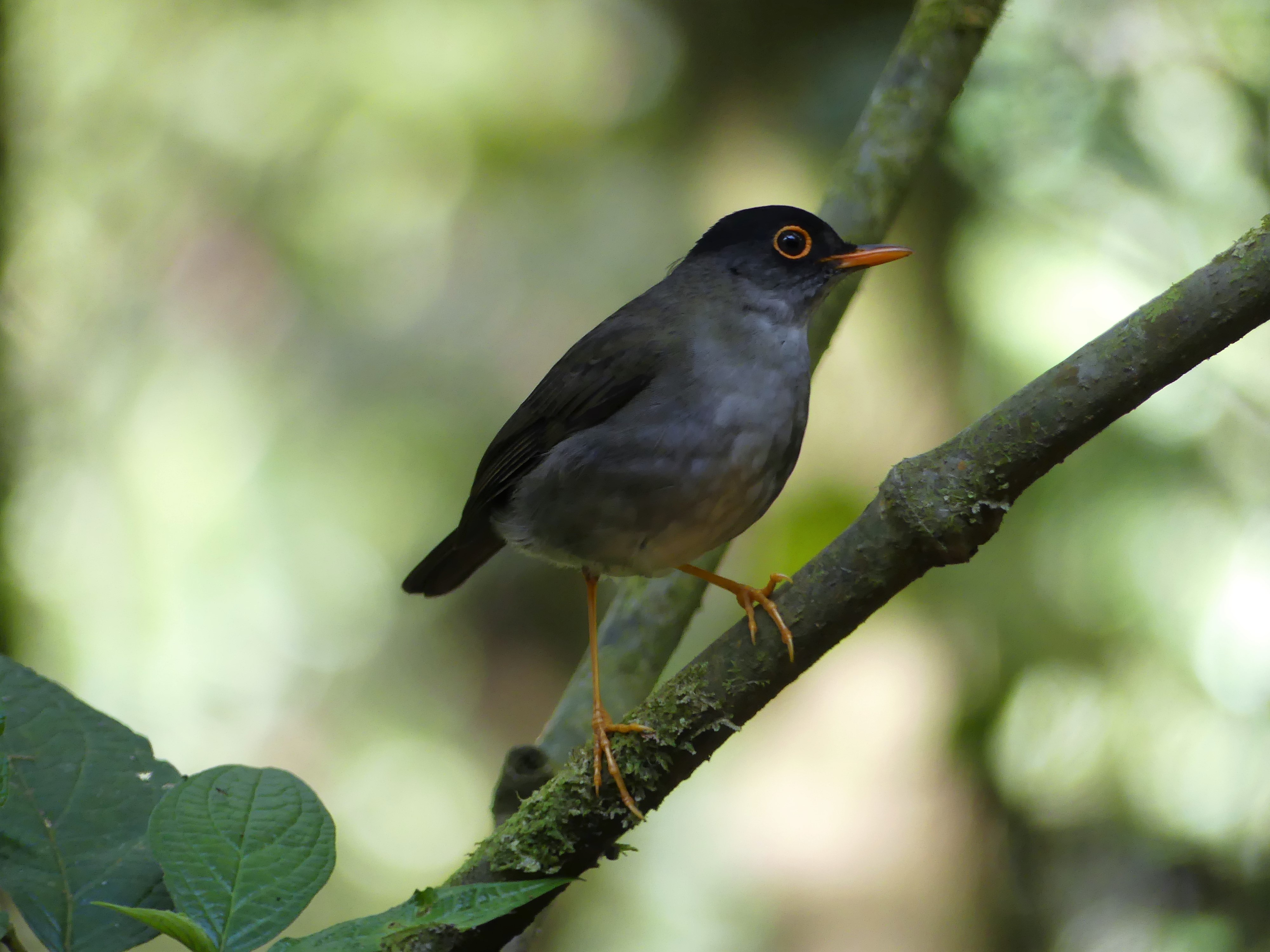

Conservation status
- Least Concern (IUCN 3.1)

Scientific classification
- Kingdom: Animalia
- Phylum: Chordata
- Class: Aves
- Order: Passeriformes
- Family: Turdidae
- Genus: Turdus
- Species: T. infuscatus

Binomial name
- Turdus infuscatus (Lafresnaye, 1844)

= Black thrush =

Species of bird

The black thrush (Turdus infuscatus) is a species of bird in the family Turdidae, the thrushes and allies. It is found in El Salvador, Guatemala, Honduras, and Mexico. It was formerly known as the black robin.

== Taxonomy and systematics ==
The black thrush was originally described in 1844 as Merula infuscata. It was later reassigned to its present genus Turdus that had been erected in 1758. For a time it and the glossy-black thrush (T. serranus) were treated as conspecific but molecular studies determined that they are separate species and not closely related. The black thrush's closest relative is the sooty thrush (T. nigrescens).

The black thrush is monotypic.

== Description ==
The black thrush is 22 to 23 cm (8.7 to 9.1 in) long and weighs about 60 to 90 g (2.1 to 3.2 oz). The species is sexually dimorphic. Adult males are almost entirely black with a slightly duller and more slaty belly and undertail coverts. They have a bright yellow ring of bare skin around the eye. Adult females have an olive brown head with dusky brown streaks on the cheeks and a dark brown eye ring. Their upperparts, tail, and upper surface of the wings are olive brown. Their chin and throat are whitish with dusky brown streaks on the latter. Their underparts are paler olive brown that is lightest on the belly and undertail coverts. Their underwing coverts are cinnamon. Juveniles have brown upperparts. Their underparts are brownish buff with black or dusky spots. All ages have a dark brown iris. Adult males have a bright yellow bill and adult females a blackish bill. Both sexes of adults have bright yellow legs and feet. Juveniles have a mostly dark bill dull yellow legs and feet.

== Distribution and habitat ==
The black thrush has a disjunct distribution. It is found in eastern Mexico's Sierra Madre Oriental from Tamaulipas south to Veracruz and in western Mexico's Sierra Madre del Sur from central Guerrero to Chiapas. Vagrants have been recorded in Jalisco, Morelos, and Tabasco. Separate populations are in west-central Guatemala, El Salvador, and approximately the western half of Honduras. It has relatively recently been found in extreme northwestern Nicaragua, and "[i]t is unclear whether this represents a range extension or whether the species had simply been overlooked previously".

The black thrush inhabits montane evergreen and pine-oak forest in the subtropical and temperate zones. It also occurs in semi-deciduous forest and cloudforest. Overall it ranges in elevation between 900 and 3,100 m (3,000 and 10,200 ft) but is most common between 1,600 and 2,600 m (5,200 and 8,500 ft). South of Mexico it ranges between 1,000 and 3,050 m (3,300 and 10,000 ft).

== Behavior ==
=== Movement ===
The black thrush is considered a year-round resident though there are anecdotal reports of elevational movements.

=== Feeding ===
The black thrush feeds on insects and fruit. It is probably an important disperser of some plant seeds. It generally forages alone or with its mate but outside the breeding season may gather at fruiting trees in flocks of up to about 20 black thrushes and other frugivorous species. It feeds mostly in the forest's mid-to upper levels but at times at all levels from the ground to the forest canopy.

=== Breeding ===
The black thrush's breeding season has not been fully defined but apparently spans at least from April to July. It builds a cup nest from moss lined with rootlets and fungal rhizomes; nests have been found as high as about 20 m (65 ft) above the ground. The clutch is one or two unmarked blue eggs. The incubation period, time to fledging, and details of parental care are not known.

=== Vocalization ===
Black thrush males sing only in the breeding season. The species is "an accomplished singer with a rich vocal repertoire that includes mimicry of other cloud forest species". Its vocalizations have been compared to those of some mockingbirds. One description of the song is "a long, varied series of well-spaced, sweet clear whistled phrases: chaao-sit!-peer!-tleeet-pip'pip-peeeer!-seeet!-weeeer!-peeer'peeer'peeer..." that is sung over several minutes. Its calls include "a clucking chuh-chuh-chuh-chuh given in mild alarm", "a more agitated harsh chatter chehk-chehk-chehk-chehk given in more acute alarm", and "a high thin ssii given in flight".

== Status ==
The IUCN has assessed the black thrush as being of Least Concern. It has a large range; its population size is not known and is believed to be decreasing. No immediate threats have been identified. The majority of the species' population is in Mexico, and it is considered threatened there. It is uncommon south of Mexico. Though it is a relatively common cage bird in Mexico this does not appear to be a threat. "Nonetheless, the species has been classified as sensitive to forest fragmentation and human disturbance." It occurs in several nominally protected areas, most of which get very little active management or oversight.
