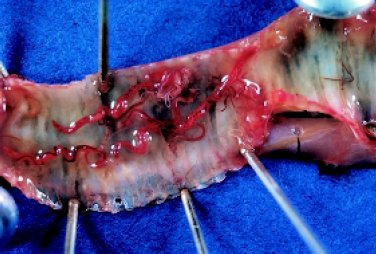
- Gapeworms in the trachea of a common pheasant

Scientific classification
- Kingdom: Animalia
- Phylum: Nematoda
- Class: Chromadorea
- Order: Rhabditida
- Family: Syngamidae
- Genus: Syngamus
- Species: S. trachea

Binomial name
- Syngamus trachea Montagu, 1811

= Gapeworm =

Species of roundworm

A gapeworm (Syngamus trachea), also known as a red worm and forked worm, is a parasitic nematode worm that infects the tracheas of certain birds. The resulting disease, known as "gape", occurs when the worms clog and obstruct the airway. The worms are also known as "red worms" or "forked worms" due to their red color and the permanent procreative conjunction of males and females. Gapeworms are common in young, domesticated chickens and turkeys.

When the female gapeworm lays her eggs in the trachea of an infected bird, the eggs are coughed up, swallowed, then defecated. Birds are infected with the parasite when they consume the eggs found in the feces, or by consuming a transport host such as earthworms or snails (Planorbarius corneus, Bithynia tentaculata and others).

== Morphology ==
Males and females are joined in a state of permanent copulation forming, a Y shape (forked worms). They are also known as the red worms because of their color. Females (up to 20mm long) are much longer than males (up to 6mm long). The life cycle of the gapeworm is peculiar in that transmission from bird to bird may be successfully accomplished either directly (by ingesting embryonated eggs or infective larvae) or indirectly (by ingestion of earthworms containing free or encysted gapeworm larvae they had obtained by feeding on contaminated soil).

== Life cycle and pathogenesis ==
In the preparasitic phase, third stage infective larvae (L3) develop inside the eggs at which time they may hatch. Earthworms serve as transport (paratenic) hosts. Larvae have been shown to remain viable for more than three years encapsulated in earthworm muscles. Other invertebrates may also serve as paratenic hosts, including terrestrial snails and slugs.

The parasitic phase involves substantial migration in the definitive host to reach the predilection site. Young birds are most severely affected with migration of larvae and adults through the lungs causing a severe pneumonia. Lymphoid nodules form at the point of attachment of the worms in the bronchi and trachea. Adult worms also appear to feed on blood. Worms in the bronchi and trachea provoke a hemorrhagic tracheitis and bronchitis, forming large quantities of mucus, plugging the air passages and, in severe cases, causing asphyxiation.

Pheasants appear to be particularly susceptible to infections resulting in mortality rates as high as 25% during outbreaks. The rapidly growing worms soon obstruct the lumen of the trachea, causing suffocation. Turkey poults, baby chicks and pheasant chicks are most susceptible to infection. Turkey poults usually develop gapeworm signs earlier and begin to die sooner after infection than young chickens. Lesions are usually found in the trachea of turkeys and pheasants but seldom if ever in the tracheas of young chickens and guinea fowl.

The male worm, in the form of lesions, remains permanently attached to the tracheal wall throughout the duration of its life. The female worms apparently detach and reattach from time to time in order to obtain a more abundant supply of food.

== Epidemiology ==
Earthworm transport hosts are important factors in the transmission of Syngamus trachea when poultry and game birds are reared on soil. The longevity of L3s in earthworms (up to 3 years) is particularly important in perpetuating the infection from year to year.

Wild birds may serve as reservoirs of infection and have been implicated as the sources of infections in outbreaks on game-bird farms as well as poultry farms. Wild reservoir hosts may include pheasants, ruffed grouse, partridges, wild turkeys, magpies, meadowlarks, American robins, grackles, jays, jackdaws, rooks, starlings and crows.

There is also evidence to suggest that strains of Syngamus trachea from wild bird reservoir hosts may be less effective in domestic birds; if they have an earthworm transport host rather than direct infections via ingestion of L3s, or eggs containing L3s.

== Clinical signs ==
Blockage of the bronchi and trachea with worms and mucus will cause infected birds to gasp for air. They stretch out their necks, open their mouths and gasp for air producing a hissing noise as they do so. This "gaping" posture has given rise to the common term "gapeworm" to describe Syngamus trachea.

These clinical signs first appear approximately 1–2 weeks after infection. Birds infected with gapeworms show signs of weakness and emaciation, usually spending much of their time with eyes closed and head drawn back against the body. An infected bird may give its head a convulsive shake in an attempt to remove the obstruction from the trachea so that normal breathing may be resumed.

Severely affected birds, particularly young ones, will deteriorate rapidly; they stop drinking and become anorexic. At this stage, death is the usual outcome. Adult birds are usually less severely affected and may only show an occasional cough or even no obvious clinical signs.

== Diagnosis ==
A diagnosis is usually made on the basis of the classical clinical signs of "gaping". Subclinical infections with few worms may be confirmed at necropsy by finding copulating worms in the trachea and also by finding the characteristic eggs in the feces of infected birds. Examination of the tracheas of infected birds shows that the mucous membrane is extensively irritated and inflamed. Coughing is apparently the result of this irritation to the mucous lining.

== Control and treatment ==
=== Prevention ===
In the artificial rearing of pheasants, gapes are a serious menace. Confinement rearing of young birds has reduced the problem in chickens compared to a few years ago. However, this parasite continues to present an occasional problem with turkeys raised on range. Confinement rearing of broilers/pullets and caging of laying hens, have significantly influenced the quantity and variety of nematode infections in poultry.

For most nematodes, control measures consist of sanitation and breaking the life cycle rather than chemotherapy. Confinement rearing on litter largely prevents infections with nematodes using intermediate hosts such as earthworms or grasshoppers, which are not normally found in poultry houses. Conversely, nematodes with direct life cycles or those that utilize intermediate hosts such as beetles, which are common in poultry houses, may prosper.

Treatment of the soil or litter to kill intermediate hosts may be beneficial. Insecticides suitable for litter treatment include carbaryl, tetrachlorvinphos (stirofos). However, treatment is usually done only between grow-outs. Extreme care should be taken to ensure that feed and water are not contaminated. Treatment of range soil to kill ova is only partially successful.

Changing litter can reduce infections, but treating floors with oil is not very effective. Raising different species or different ages of birds together or in close proximity is a dangerous procedure as regards parasitism. Adult turkeys, which are carriers of gapeworms, can transmit the disease to young chicks or pheasants, although older chickens are almost resistant to infection.

=== Treatment ===
Flubendazole (Flubenvet) is the only licensed anthelmintic for use in poultry and game birds. Continuous medication of pen-reared birds has been recommended, but is not economical and increases the possibility of drug resistance. Several other compounds have been shown effective against S. trachea under experimental conditions. Methyl 5-benzoyl-2-benzimidazole was 100% efficacious when fed prophylactically to turkey poults. 5-Isopropoxycarbonylamino-2-(4-thizolyl)-benzimidazole was found to be more efficacious than thiabendazole or disophenol.

The level of control with three treatments of cambendazole on days 3–4, 6–7, and 16-17 post-infection was 94.9% in chickens and 99.1% in turkeys. Levamisole (Ergamisol), fed at a level of 0.04% for 2 days or 2 g/gal drinking water for 1 day each month, has proven effective in game birds. Fenbendazole (Panacur) at 20 mg/kg for 3–4 days is also effective. Ivermectin injections may be effective in treating resistant strains.

== Sources ==
1. https://web.archive.org/web/20100703145151/http://cal.vet.upenn.edu/projects/merial/Strongls/strong_4.htm
2. https://web.archive.org/web/20110717194656/http://www.vetsweb.com/diseases/syngamus-trachea-d75.html#effects
