= Peace Bridge =

Truss arch bridge connecting US to Canada

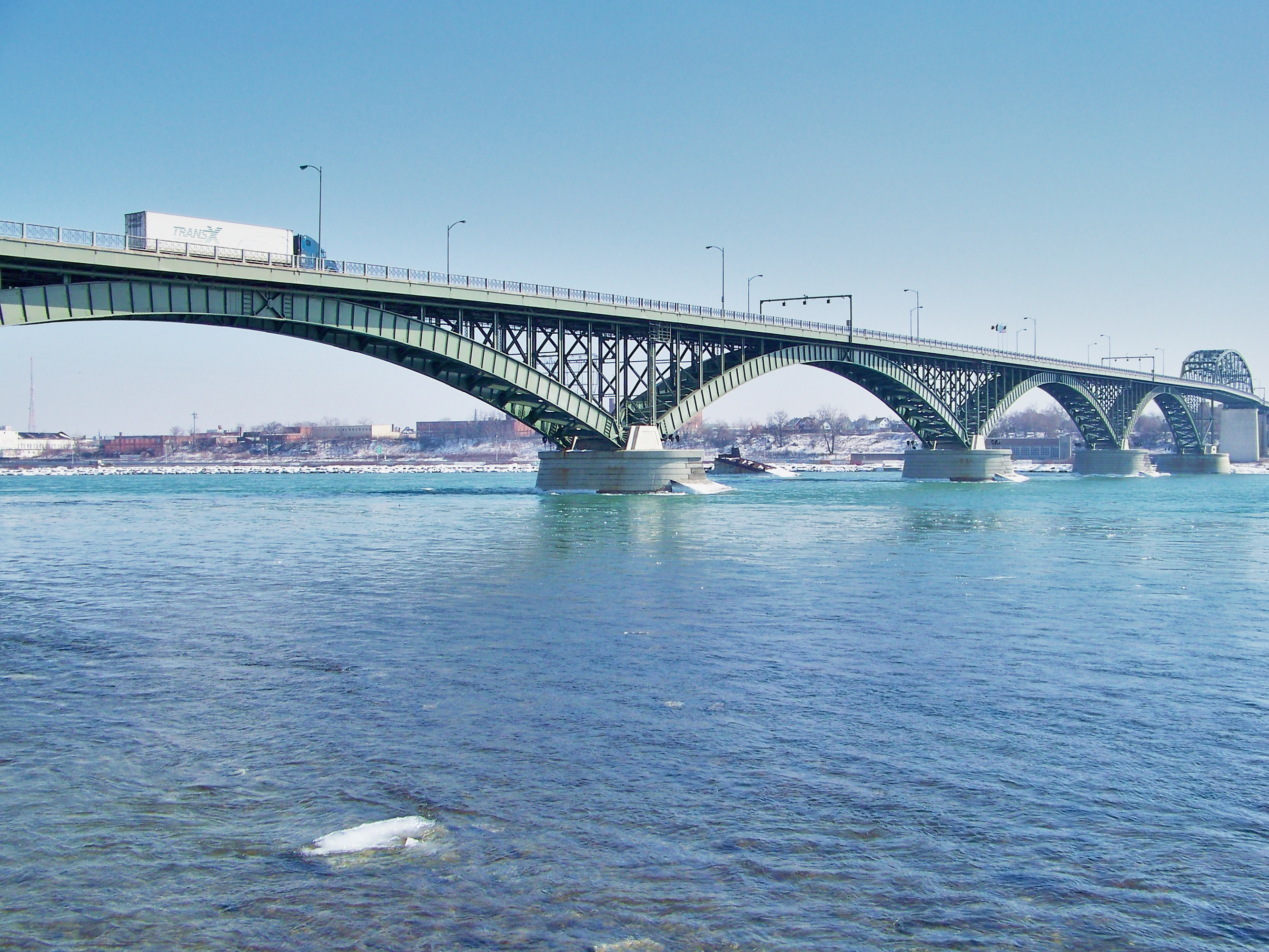
- Peace Bridge from the Canadian side.
- Coordinates: 42.90694°N 78.90556°W
- Carries: 3 reversible lanes of NY 955B / Queen Elizabeth Way
- Crosses: Niagara River
- Locale: Fort Erie, Ontario and Buffalo, New York
- Maintained by: Buffalo and Fort Erie Public Bridge Authority (Peace Bridge Authority)

Characteristics
- Design: Deck type truss and arch bridge
- Total length: 5,800 feet (1.77 km)
- Longest span: 130 m

History
- Opened: June 1, 1927; 99 years ago

Statistics
- Toll: Canada-bound only: $4.00 USD (E-ZPass), $8.00 USD (card), or $11 CAD (card)

Location
- Interactive map of Peace Bridge

The Peace Bridge is an international bridge over the Niagara River between Canada and the United States, located just north of the river's source at the east end of Lake Erie about 20 kilometres (12.4 mi) upriver of Niagara Falls. It connects Buffalo, New York, in the United States to Fort Erie, Ontario, in Canada. It is operated and maintained by the bi-national Buffalo and Fort Erie Public Bridge Authority, incorporated as both a Class D public benefit corporation in the State of New York and a Crown corporation federally in Canada, governed under the terms of an agreement between New York and the Canadian federal government.

The Peace Bridge consists of five arched spans over the Niagara River and a Parker deck-type truss span over the Black Rock Canal on the American side of the river. The length is 5,800 feet (1.77 km). Material used in the construction included 3,500 feet (1.07 km) of steelwork, 9,000 tons of structural steel and 800 tons of reinforcing steel in the concrete abutments. The Peace Bridge was named to commemorate 100 years of peace between the United States and Canada. It was constructed as a highway bridge to address pedestrian and motor vehicle traffic which could not be accommodated on the International Railway Bridge, built in 1873.

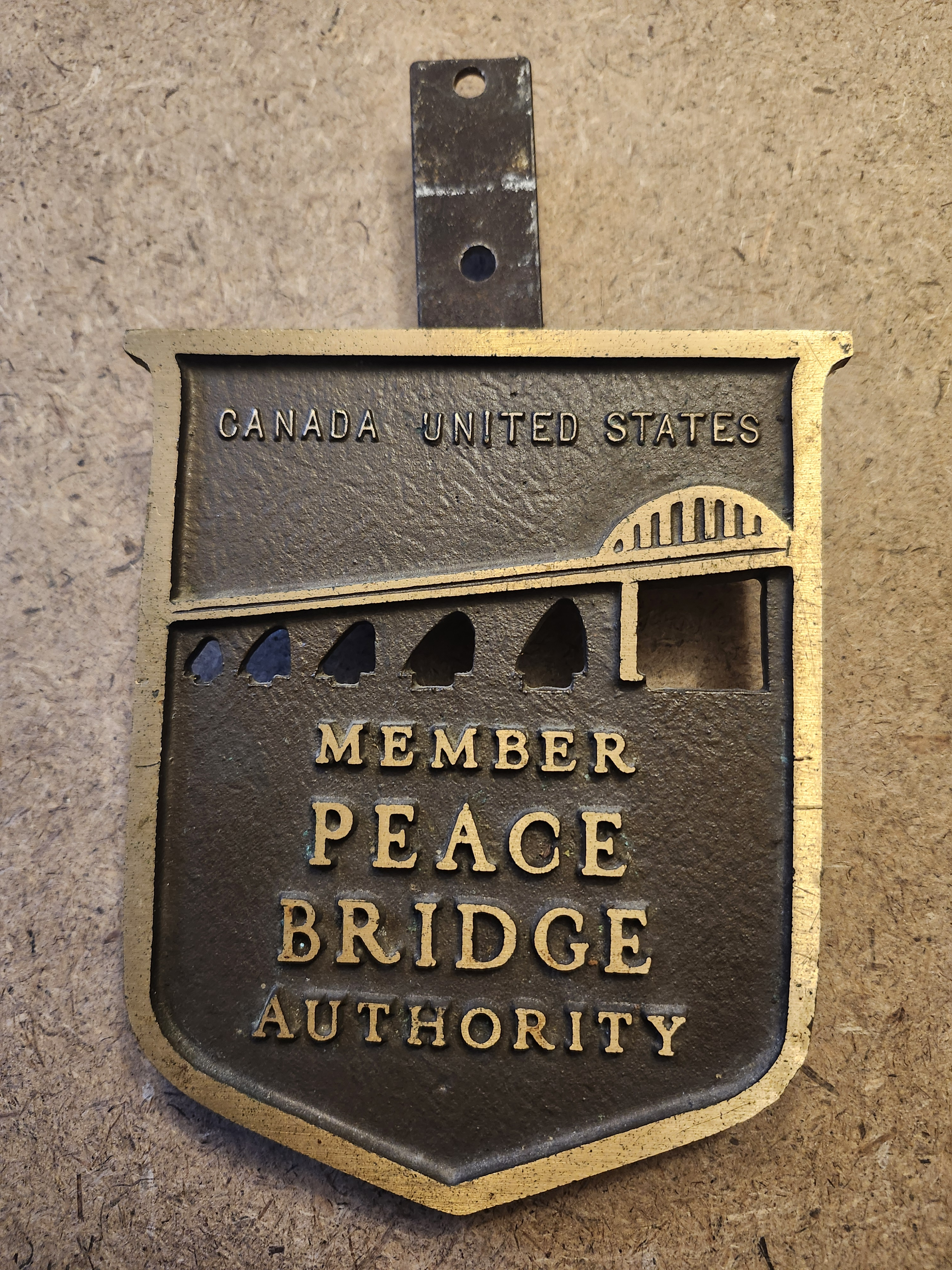
Peace Bridge Board Member License Plate Topper

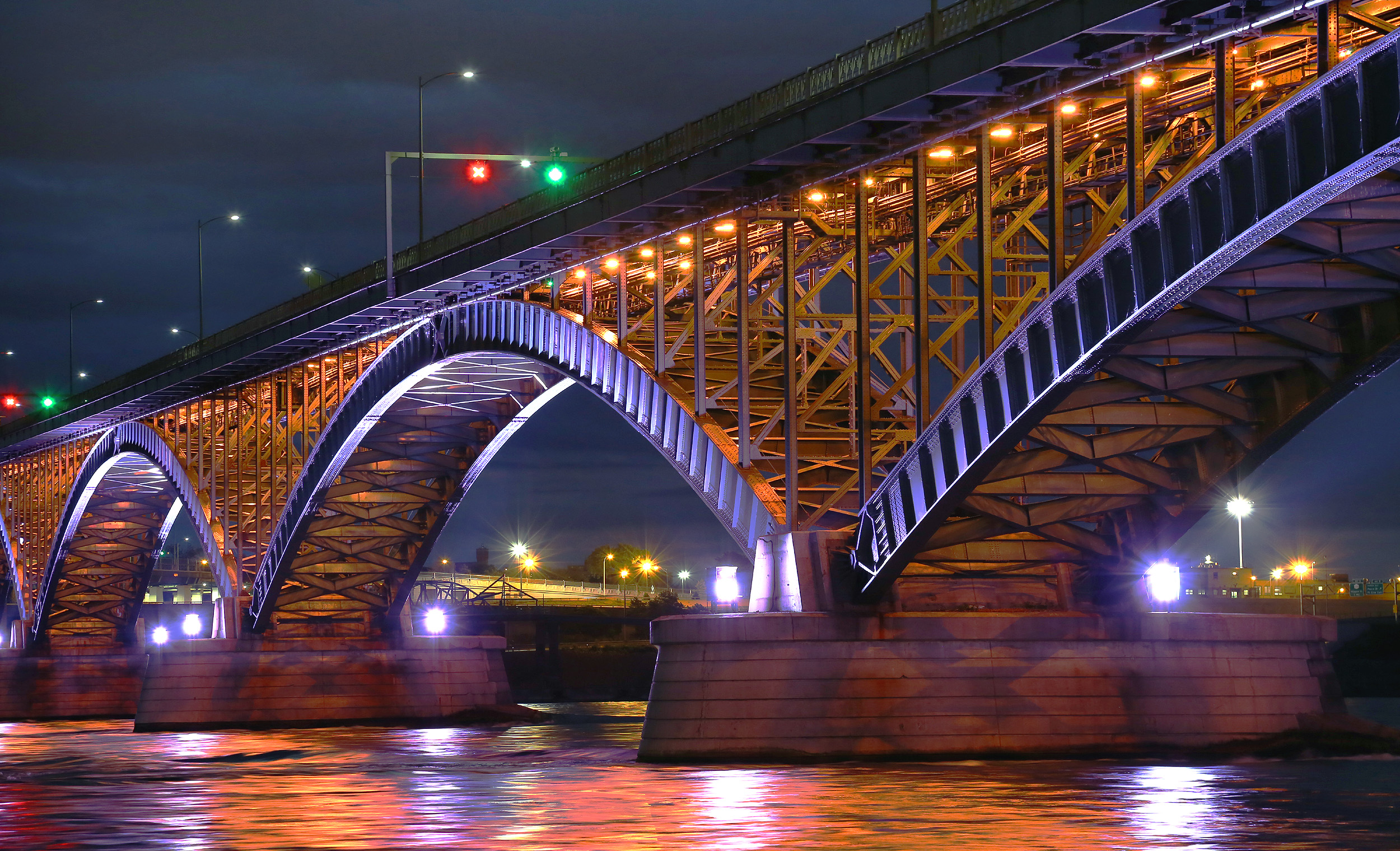
Peace Bridge from Fort Erie, with new lighting retrofit

== Peace Bridge archeological site ==
The peace bridge site is an archeological site under the foot of the Peace Bridge in Fort Erie, Ontario and surrounding areas which is the source of millions of artifacts from pre-colonial indigenous history. The site contained a quarry for Onondaga chert which was significant source flint for ancient indigenous peoples. The site also has gravesites and artefacts that range from the ancient Archaic period up to the 16th century. Archeological operations have taken place on the site and surrounding areas since 1909, when Frederick Houghton of the Buffalo Museum of Science began to seriously research the area.

Items found in the archeological site are on display at the Mewinzha Archaeology and Indigenous History Gallery in the lobby of the Peace Bridge Administration Building of Fort Erie.

== History ==
The building of the Peace Bridge was approved by the International Joint Commission on August 6, 1925. Edward Lupfer served as chief engineer. A major obstacle to building the bridge was the swift river current, which averages 7.5 to 12 miles per hour (12.1 to 19.3 km/h). Construction began in 1925 and was completed in the spring of 1927. On March 13, 1927, Lupfer drove the first car across the bridge. On June 1, 1927, the bridge was opened to the public.

The official opening ceremony was held two months later, on August 7, 1927, with about 20,000 in attendance. The festivities were transmitted to the public via radio in the first international coast-to-coast broadcast. Newspapers at the time estimated that as many as 50 million listeners may have heard the broadcast.

The dignitaries who took part in the dedication ceremonies included The Prince of Wales (the future Edward VIII), Prince George, Canadian Prime Minister William Lyon Mackenzie King, British Prime Minister Stanley Baldwin, U.S. Vice President Charles Dawes, Secretary of State Frank Kellogg, New York Governor Al Smith and Ontario Premier Howard Ferguson.

When the bridge opened, Buffalo and Fort Erie each became the chief port of entry to their respective countries from the other. At the time it was the only vehicular bridge on the Great Lakes from Niagara Falls to New York. The bridge remains one of North America's important commercial ports with four thousand trucks crossing it daily.

After several years of paying one-way tolls already, new toll facilities were installed on the Canadian side as of January 20, 2002, the Peace Bridge became the first E-ZPass facility outside the United States. There are no fees for entering the US.

== Alternatives ==
The Peace Bridge is one of the busiest on the Canada–United States border, with over one million trucks crossing it each year and delays of up to almost four hours. Other nearby bridges between the United States and Canada include the Rainbow Bridge, the Queenston-Lewiston Bridge and the Whirlpool Rapids Bridge. The Queenston-Lewiston Bridge and the Peace Bridge are the only Niagara River crossings that allow heavy trucks.

== Customs inspection and toll plazas ==
There are customs plazas at both ends of the bridge, with the Canadian plaza the newer and larger of the two.

The inbound customs plaza in the United States has seven lanes for trucks and nine for cars. Pedestrians and cyclists are processed to the left of the truck inspection area.

The inbound customs plaza in Canada was designed by NORR Limited Architects and Engineers and completed in 2010. There are 14 booths/lanes for cars and a separate area for trucks (handling five trucks at a time). Pedestrians and cyclists are processed in an area on the right side of the inspection area for cars.

Once vehicles leave the customs plaza in Canada, vehicles approach a smaller toll plaza to pay toll for using the Peace Bridge. Payment for tolls are accepted by credit / debit cards ($8.00 USD or $11 CAD), E-ZPass ($4.00 USD), or old Peace Bridge tokens. There are no toll booths when entering the U.S. and no tolls for pedestrians or cyclists.

=== Preclearance ===
In October 2012, it was announced by the DHS and Public Safety Canada that a pilot program, years in the works, to preclear all truck traffic from Canada into Buffalo would be commenced. The pilot would start in late December 2012 and run for 18 months, after which the economic benefits would be assessed and its feasibility to make permanent would then be recommended to both the U.S Congress and the Parliament of Canada.

== Regulation ==
The Buffalo and Fort Erie Public Bridge Authority is led by a ten-member board, five from each country. The chairmanship alternates annually between a Canadian representative and an American representative.

Two of the five US members are appointed by the Governor of New York with confirmation by the New York State Senate. The remaining members are the Commissioner of the New York State Department of Transportation, Chairman of the Niagara Frontier Transportation Authority, and the Attorney General of New York (or their delegates).

All five of the Canadian members are appointed by the Governor-in-Council as per recommendation by the federal Minister of Transport.

== Road connections ==
The New York State Department of Transportation designates the bridge as NY 955B, an unsigned reference route. Interstate 190 adjoins the bridge and has a direct northbound off-ramp (exit 9) to it. The Queen Elizabeth Way begins at the Canada–United States border.

== Commemorations ==
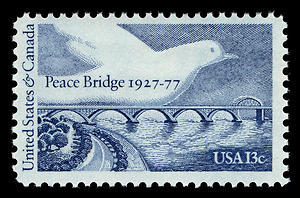
US Peace Bridge stamp

- Buffalo resident Emma M. Herold-Haft composed the Peace Bridge March in honor of the bridge's opening in 1927.
- On August 4, 1977, Canada Post and the United States Postal Service brought out a joint issue of postage stamps to commemorate the 50th anniversary of the bridge. Unusual for joint issues, the two designs are radically different, with the US print being all blue and the Canadian print in full colour).

== See also ==
- List of bridges documented by the Historic American Engineering Record in New York
- List of bridges in Canada
- List of international bridges in North America
- List of crossings of the Niagara River
- List of reference routes in New York
- Peace Bridge robins
