= Syngamidae =

Scientific classification
- Kingdom: Animalia
- Phylum: Nematoda
- Class: Chromadorea
- Order: Rhabditida
- Superfamily: Strongyloidea
- Family: Syngamidae; Leiper, 1912

Family of roundworms

The Syngamidae are a family of nematodes which commonly parasitize mammals, birds, and rarely humans. They are classified in the Strongyloidae superfamily and Strongylata order.

Notable species within the family Syngamidae include Syngamus trachea, commonly known as the gapeworm, which infests birds, and Mammomonogamus laryngeus, which is a parasite of ungulates, cats, and orangutans, and which can accidentally infect humans.

Parasitic infection occurs when the host ingests the parasite via contaminated food, water, or intermediate hosts like earthworms, snails, and arthropods. Worms usually migrate and inhabit the respiratory tract of hosts, where the male and female worms join in permanent copulation.

Syngamidae nematodes are globally distributed and are important in veterinary parasitology.

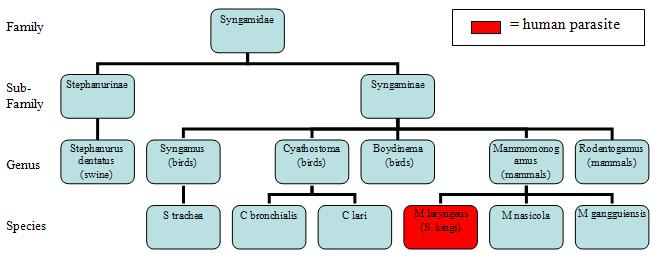
Taxonomic Syngamidae tree
