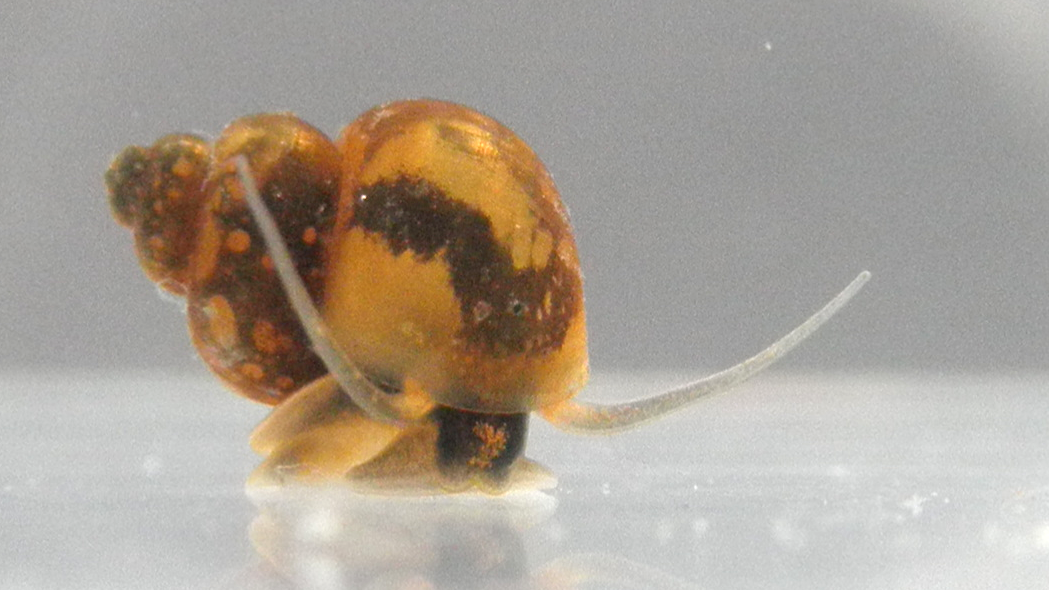
- A live Bithynia leachii

Conservation status
- Least Concern (IUCN 3.1)

- Extinct (IUCN 3.1)

Scientific classification
- Kingdom: Animalia
- Phylum: Mollusca
- Class: Gastropoda
- Subclass: Caenogastropoda
- Order: Littorinimorpha
- Superfamily: Truncatelloidea
- Family: Bithyniidae
- Genus: Bithynia
- Species: B. leachii

Binomial name
- Bithynia leachii (Sheppard, 1823)

Synonyms
- Bithynia leachi (Sheppard, 1823); Codiella leachii Sheppard, 1823

= Bithynia leachii =

Species of gastropod

Bithynia leachii is species of small freshwater snail with an operculum, an aquatic prosobranch gastropod mollusk in the family Bithyniidae.

== Distribution ==
It is a Palearctic species found in North Africa and Europe to East Siberia.

- Czech Republic – near Morava River and near Thaya river in the southernmost Moravia near Hlohovec, Kostice and Tvrdonice, critically endangered (CR)
- Germany – high endangered (Stark gefährdet)
- Netherlands
- Poland
- Slovakia – in Danube drainage basin (mainly in Žitný ostrov) and in Tisza drainage basin
- Sweden
- Great Britain
- Ireland
- Hungary

== Shell description ==
The width of the shell is 3–7 mm. The height of the shell is 4–8 mm. The colour is brown or grey. There are 4 to 4.5 very convex whorls forming a short cone with a very deep suture in comparison to Bithynia tentaculata. The spire is shorter and less sharp than in Bithynia tentaculata. The aperture and operculum upside are smoothly rounded. The aperture is without a sharp point on the upper corner.

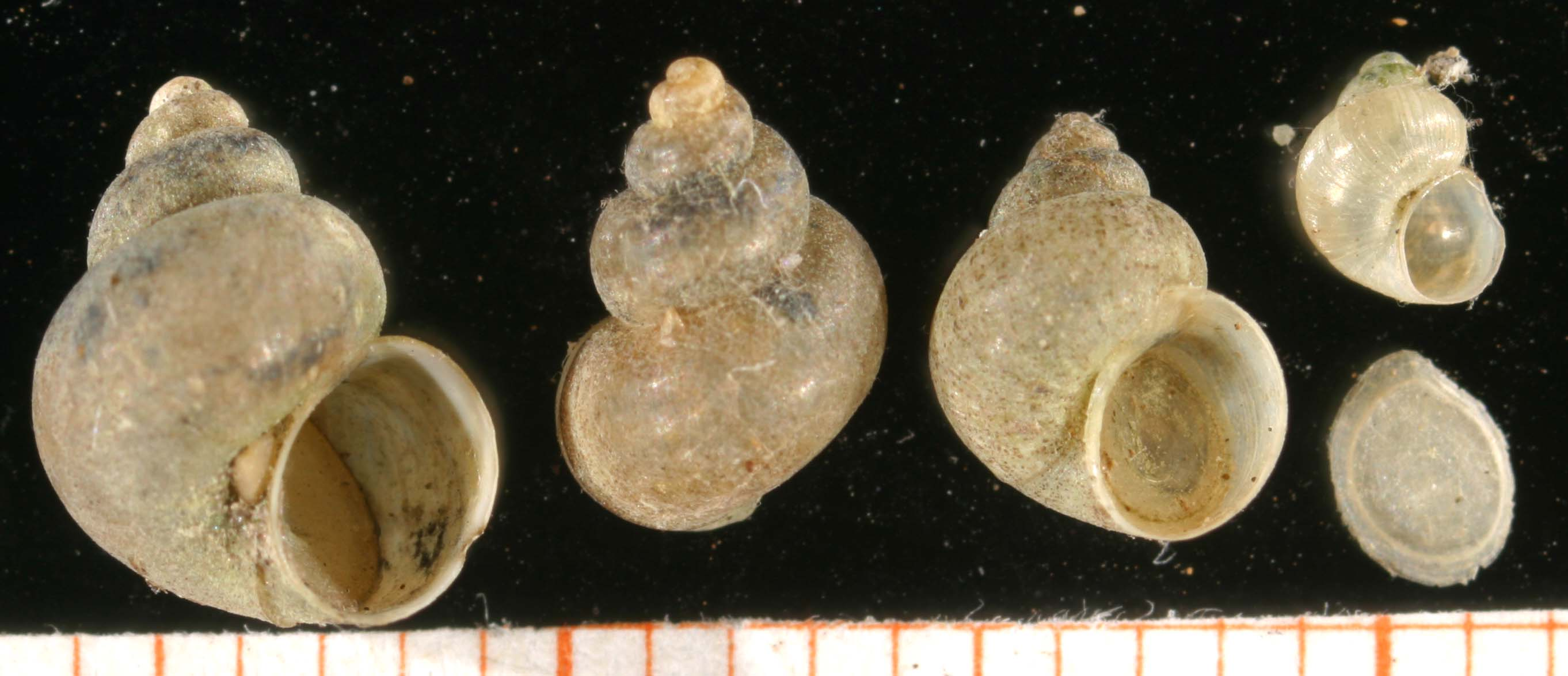
Shells of Bithynia leachii

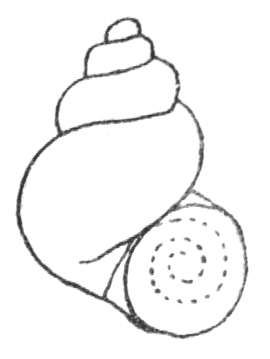
Drawing of shell and operculum of Bithynia leachii

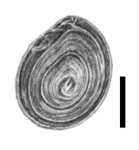
Operculum of Bithynia leachii

== Habitat ==
This species requires clean, calcium-rich water, which is slow-running and thickly weeded.

== Parasites ==
Parasites of Bithynia leachii include:

- Prosthogonimidae: Bithynia leachii can act as first intermediate host for Prosthogonimus ovatus.
- Opisthorchiidae: Bithynia leachii serves as the first intermediate host for Opisthorchis felineus.
