= Prosthogonimus ovatus =

Scientific classification
- Kingdom: Animalia
- Phylum: Platyhelminthes
- Class: Trematoda
- Order: Plagiorchiida
- Family: Prosthogonimidae
- Genus: Prosthogonimus
- Species: P. ovatus

Binomial name
- Prosthogonimus ovatus (Rudolphi, 1803)

Species of fluke

Prosthogonimus ovatus is a species of a trematodes, or fluke worms, in the family Prosthogonimidae.

== Life cycle ==
The first intermediate hosts of Prosthogonimus ovatus include freshwater snails:

- Anisus spirorbis
- Bithynia leachii
- Bithynia tentaculata
- Planorbarius corneus

The definitive host lives in the oviducts of corn crake Crex crex.
