= Planorbarius scoliostoma =

Scientific classification
- Kingdom: Animalia
- Phylum: Mollusca
- Class: Gastropoda
- Superorder: Hygrophila
- Family: Planorbidae
- Genus: Planorbarius
- Species: P. scoliostoma

Binomial name
- Planorbarius scoliostoma (Westerlund, 1898)

Synonyms
- Planorbis (Spirodiscus) scoliostoma Westerlund, 1898; unaccepted, superseded combination

Species of gastropod

Planorbatius scoliostoma is a species of freshwater gastropod in the family Planorbidae. It can be found in Greece, where it is endangered.

== Taxonomy ==
Planorbarius scoliostoma was originally described by Carl Agardh Westerlund in 1898 under the name Planorbis (Spirodiscus) scoliostoma. One preserved specimen is held in the UF Invertebrate Zoology collection in Hungary.

== Description ==
Planorbarius scoliostoma has a shell diameter of about 36 mm (1.4 in) and a shell height of about 14 mm (0.55 in). There are 5 revolutions of the shell (whorls).

== Distribution and conservation ==
Planorbarius scoliostoma is known from Greece, where it is considered an endangered species. It may be found in the region of Acarnania, with one specific occurrence at Lake Trichonida.
