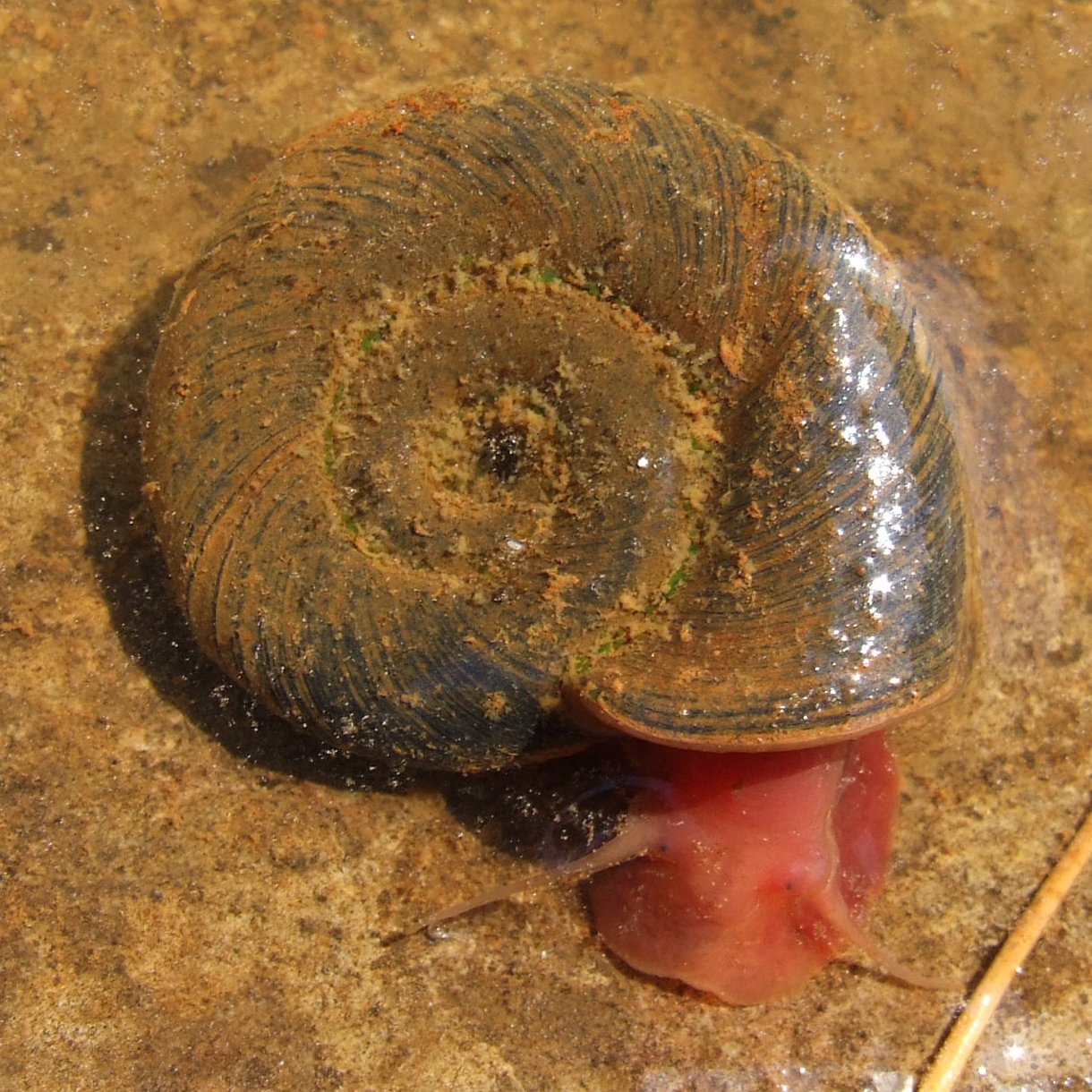
- A live individual of Planorbarius corneus, carrying the shell with the umbilicus uppermost
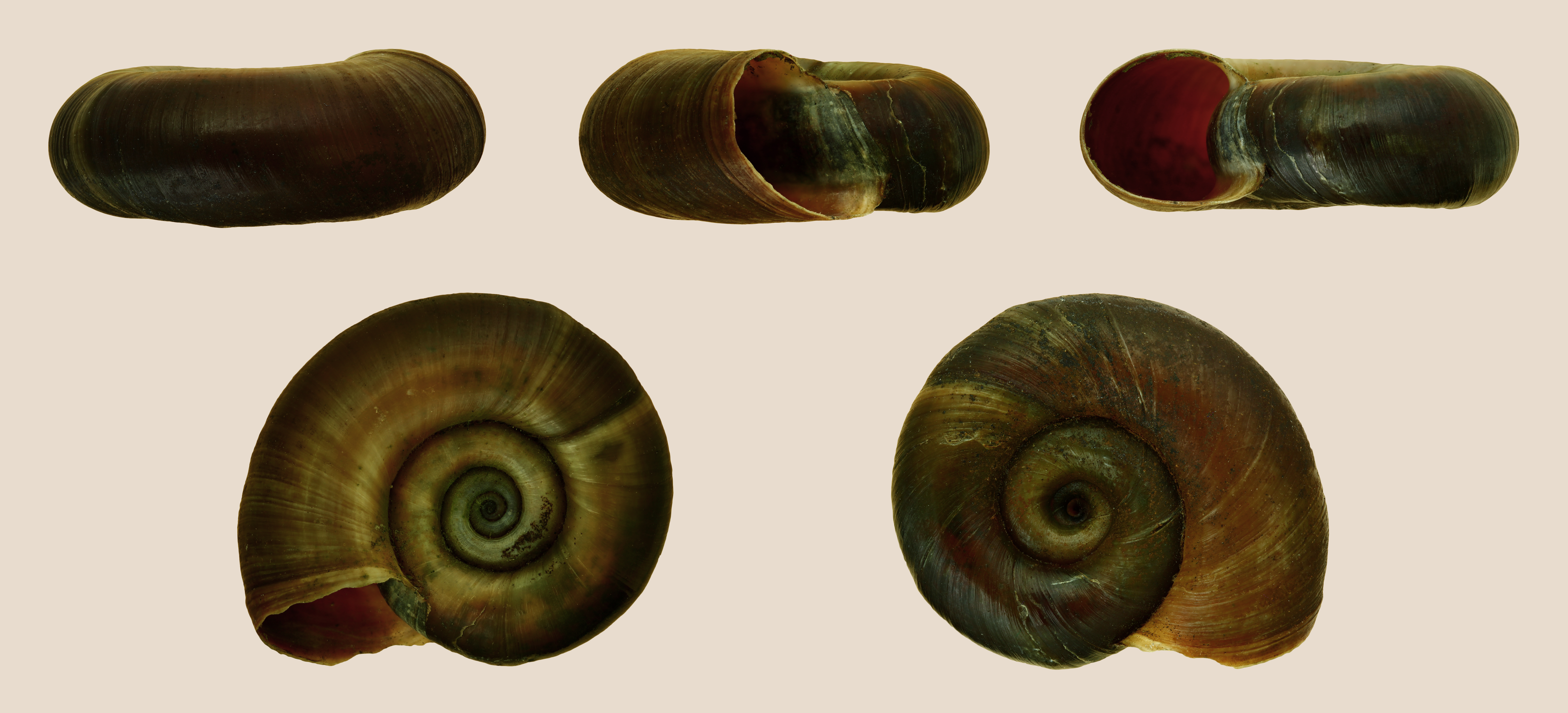
- A shell of Planorbarius corneus

Conservation status
- Least Concern (IUCN 3.1)

Scientific classification
- Kingdom: Animalia
- Phylum: Mollusca
- Class: Gastropoda
- Superorder: Hygrophila
- Family: Planorbidae
- Genus: Planorbarius
- Species: P. corneus

Binomial name
- Planorbarius corneus (Linnaeus, 1758)

Synonyms
- List: Coretus corneus (Linnaeus, 1758); junior objective synonym; Coretus corneus corneus (Linnaeus, 1758); junior objective synonym; Coretus corneus etruscus (Mousson, 1859); junior synonym; Helix cornea Linnaeus, 1758; superseded combination; Planorbarius corneus corneus (Linnaeus, 1758); unaccepted; Planorbarius corneus etruscus (Mousson, 1859); junior synonym; Planorbarius penchinati (Bourguignat, 1870); unaccepted; Planorbarius purpurea (O. F. Müller, 1774); junior synonym; †Planorbis (Helisoma) clathratus F. Sandberger, 1880; junior subjective synonym; †Planorbis clathratus F. Sandberger, 1880; junior subjective synonym; Planorbis corneus (Linnaeus, 1758); superseded combination; Planorbis corneus var. praetextus Hilbert, 1917; junior subjective synonym; Planorbis etruscus Mousson, 1859; junior synonym; Planorbis megistus (Bourguignat, 1870); junior subjective synonym; Planorbis penchinati (Bourguignat, 1870); junior synonym; Planorbis purpura (Bourguignat, 1870); junior synonym; Planorbis similis O. F. Müller, 1774; junior synonym; Planorbis similis M. Bielz, 1851; unaccepted

= Planorbarius corneus =

Species of gastropod

Planorbarius corneus, common name the great ramshorn, is a relatively large species of air-breathing freshwater snail, an aquatic pulmonate gastropod mollusk in the family Planorbidae, the ram's horn snails. It is native to Europe, though is most common in central Europe and the Balkans region. This species possesses the protein hemoglobin in its blood, which allows it to live in oxygen-poor environments. It may live for up to 6 years in captivity, and likely has a reproductive cycle of about 1 year.

The shell of this species appears to be dextral in coiling, even though it is in fact sinistral or left-handed.

== Taxonomy ==
Planorbarius corneus is known by a long list of taxonomic synonyms, the earliest of which was Helix cornea in 1758. Carl Linnaeus was the first to describe the species in the 10th edition of the Systema Naturae.

This species formerly had 4 subspecies; Planorbarius corneus arabatzis, Planorbarius corneus corneus, Planorbarius corneus etruscus, and Planorbarius corneus grandis. P. arabatzis and P. grandis are now considered distinct species, while the other two are no longer valid as subspecies.

== Distribution ==
Planorbarius corneus is distributed from western Europe, through central Europe and into the Caucasus, north into Siberia and south into the Middle East. Additionally, as the species is commonly sold in the aquarium trade, it may be found outside of its main range in ponds where they have been introduced. The species is very common in central Europe and the Balkans, where it has been recorded at densities of up to 40 individuals per square meter. It is not as common in southwestern Europe.

In western Europe, it has been recorded in Belgium, France and the British Isles (including Britain, Ireland, the Isle of Man, Guernsey and Jersey). It is not found in Spain, but it has been recorded on some Spanish and Portuguese islands, including Madeira, the Azores, the Canary Islands. In the Nordic countries, it has been recorded in Denmark, Finland, Sweden and Norway. In central Europe, it is found in Austria, Germany, the Netherlands, Luxembourg, Lichtenstein, Switzerland and the Czech Republic, and in southern Europe it has been recorded in Greece and Italy. In eastern Europe and the Caucasus, its range includes Albania, Armenia, Azerbaijan, Bosnia and Herzegovina, Bulgaria, Croatia, Estonia, Hungary, Latvia, Lithuania, North Macedonia, Montenegro, Poland, Romania, Serbia, Slovakia, Slovenia and Ukraine. The species is also found in western Asia, having been recorded in Kazakhstan, Iran, western regions of Russia, Turkey, Turkmenistan and Uzbekistan.

== Description ==
Planorbarius corneus is the largest European species of ramshorn snail (family Planorbidae), with a shell typically measuring 35 mm (1.4 in) in diameter and 12 mm (0.47 in) in width when fully-grown. The shell is a reddish-brown or olive color, though albino variants may have lighter colors. The shell is somewhat reflective, with visible growth lines, and juvenile snails possess hairs along the shell's surface. There are between 5–5.5 whorls, or revolutions of the shell. Each whorl is round, with no observable keel. Each successive whorl grows in size, leaving the center of the shell (the umbilicus) sunken. Sutures between whorls are deep. The opening of the shell, called the aperture, is kidney-shaped. The animal's skin can be brown or black in coloration, but albino variants may appear red or white. A protrusible siphon is present near the front edge of the shell, connecting to a chamber in which the lungs reside.

The 10–17 by 22–40 millimetres (0.39–0.67 by 0.87–1.57 in) coiled shell has between 3 and 4.5 rounded whorls with deep sutures, the last whorl predominating. The upper side is weakly depressed and the lower side is deeply depressed (flattened on the underside but spire recessed on the upper side). There is no keel. The shell is light yellowish with a brown, reddish or greenish periostracum, radially and spirally weakly striated. The aperture is wide and almost circular. All species within family Planorbidae have sinistral shells.

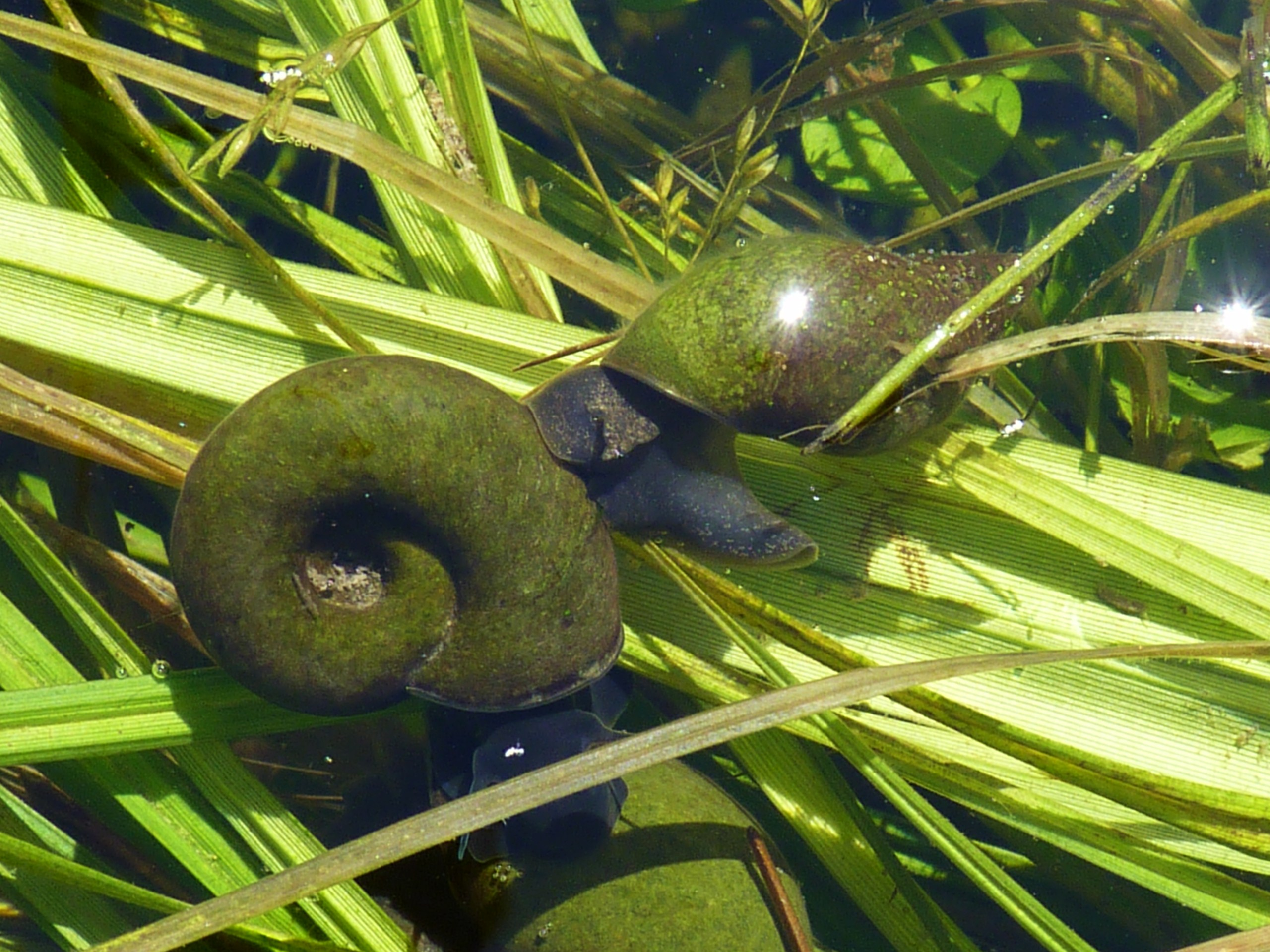
Together with a Lymnaea stagnalis snail.

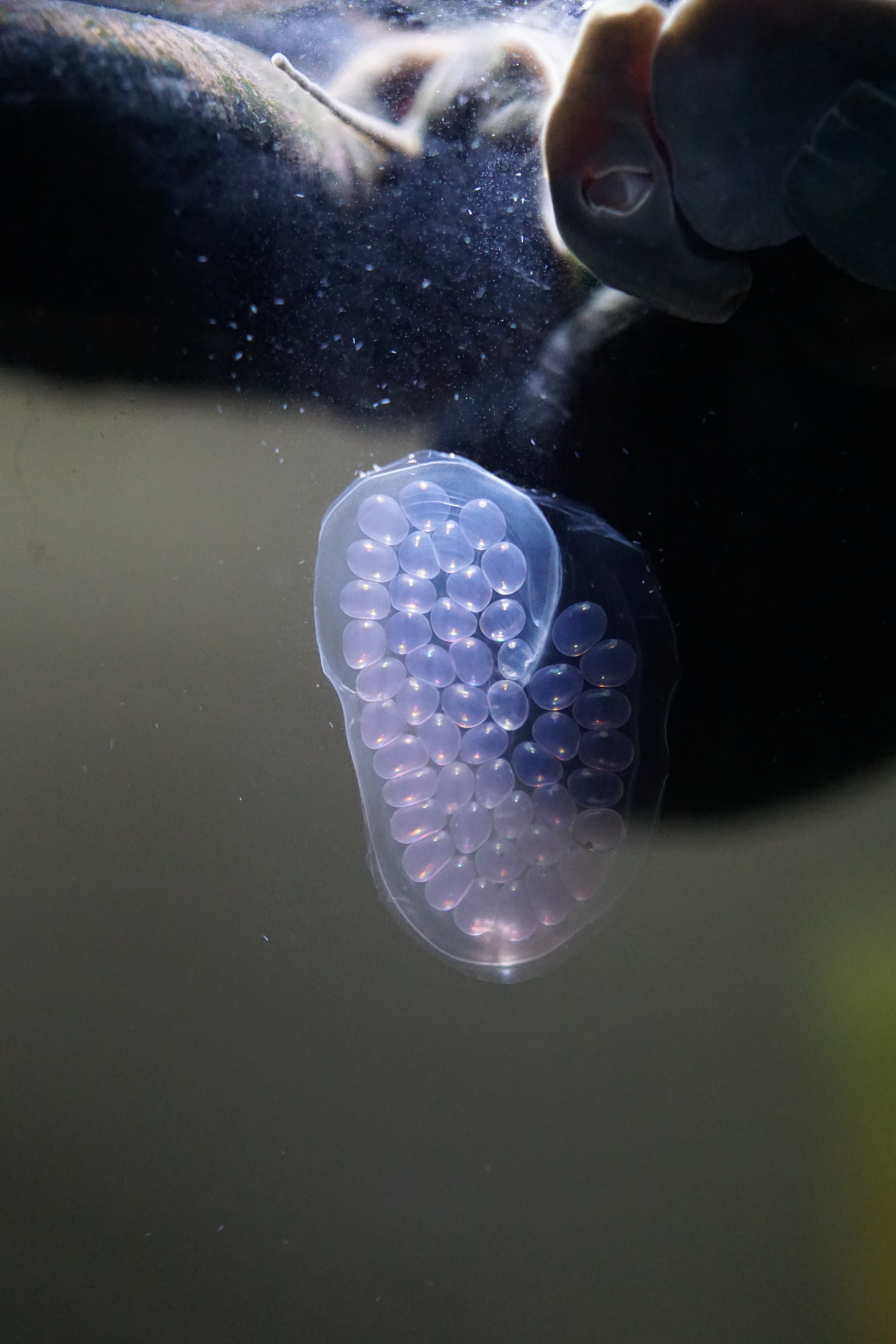
Eggs, not more than one day old, together with several feeding adults. The clutch is 12 millimeters long. Also, a snail's mouth with its radula can be seen clearly.

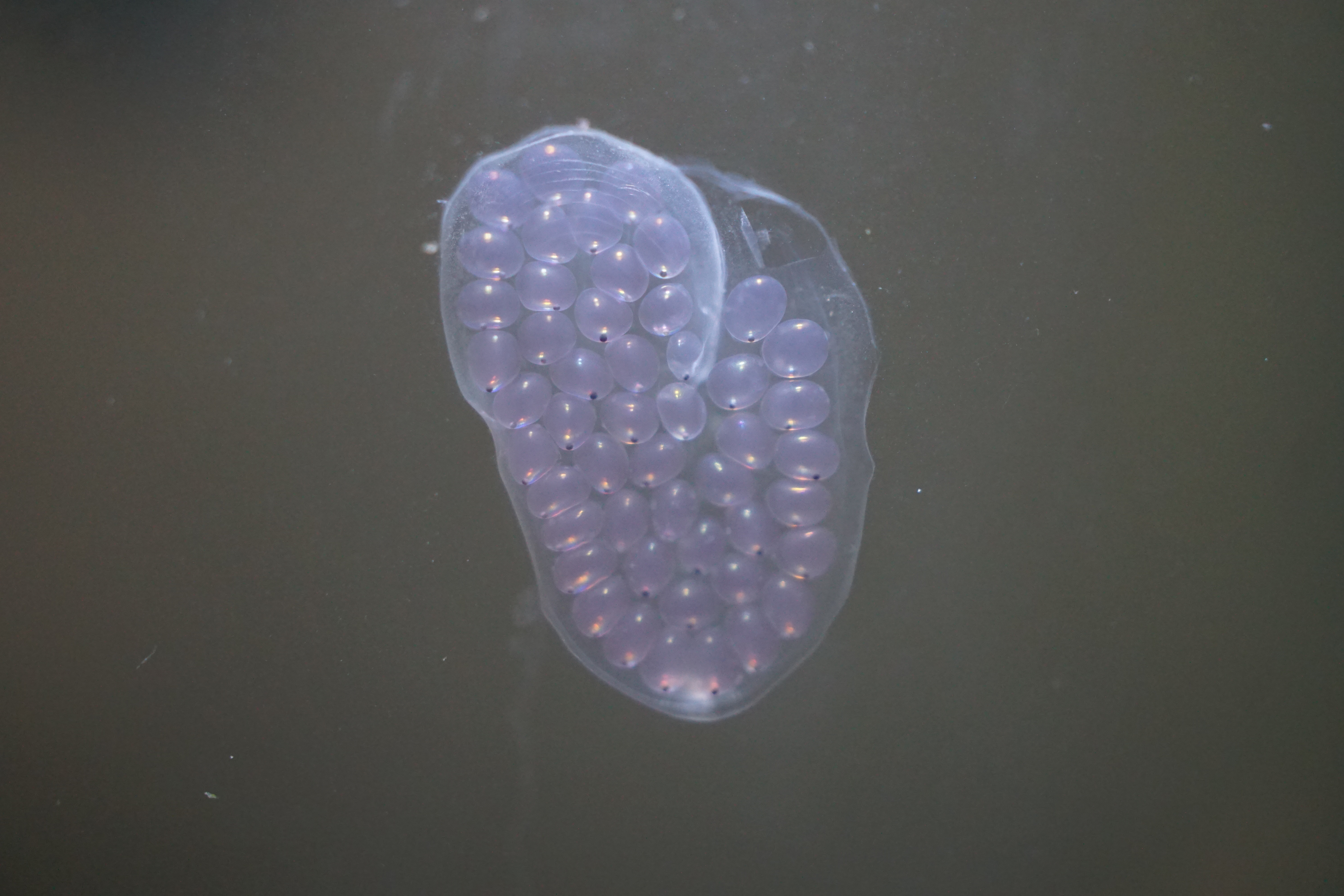
The same eggs, two days later. Snail fetuses are visible.

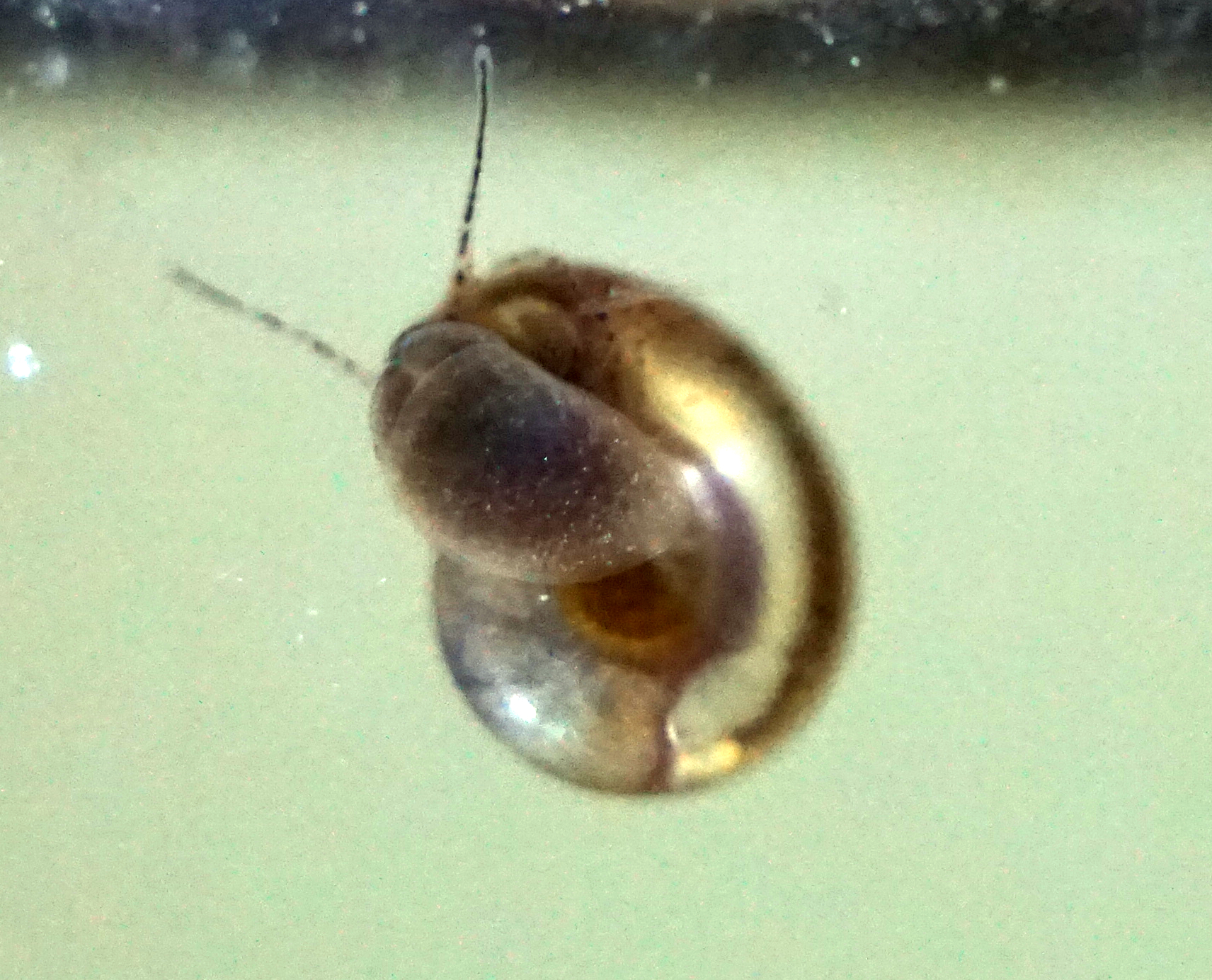
Young specimen, about 3 millimeters long.

== Habitat, physiology, and ecology ==
Planorbarius corneus may be found in freshwater ponds, rivers, and canals, where it clings to vegetation. The species seemingly prefers water which is slow moving, highly vegetated, and contains lots of dissolved minerals. The water in which it inhabits may sometimes be poorly oxygenated. It is thought that, similar to Peregriana peregra, this species stays close to shallow water, as the emergent plants growing there provide access to the surface for oxygen. The snail has two methods of respiration. In well-oxygenated waters, it is able to breathe through simple diffusion of oxygen through its skin. However, in poorly oxygenated waters, it must extend its siphon above the surface of the water to fill its lungs. Additionally, its blood contains the protein hemoglobin, acting as an oxygen transporter in low-oxygen environments.

P. corneus under high temperatures has been studied by Kartavykh & Podkovkin (2002).

This species seems to be a generalist in its diet; what they eat may depend on what is available and how hungry the animal is. It has been observed to eat the egg capsules of Anisus vortex, though this may have been incidental.

== Reproduction ==
Like most freshwater pulmonates, Planorbarius corneus probably follows a yearly reproduction cycle. In a 1963 study in southern England, eggs were thought to hatch in May, with the reproductive period ending before June. However, the snails may be able to live for longer than one year, with reports of them living as long as 6 years in captivity.

In an experiment, this species was shown to lay pinkish egg masses on aquatic plants such as Elodea and Ceratophyllum, as well as on the glass walls of the aquarium. The egg masses were cylindrical or oval-shaped, and had average dimensions of 12 by 8 mm (0.47 by 0.31 in). Each egg mass contained between 12–49 light yellow eggs, though by one account, this can reach up to 60. Eggs first began hatching within 31–65 days of being laid, though not all embryos hatched at once. An additional 9–21 days were observed for the final embryos to emerge from the egg capsules. In the experimenter's opinion, these observations are likely to be consistent between both captive and wild specimens.

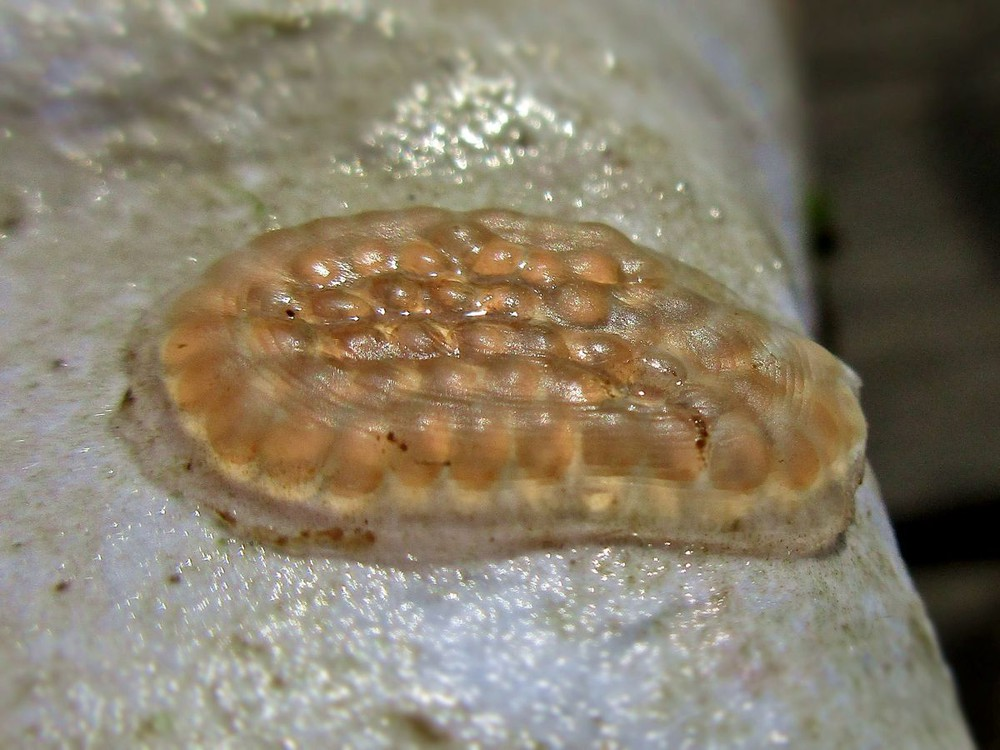
An egg mass of Planorbarius corneus in the Netherlands.

Reproduction in spring and autumn at water temperatures above 15 °C, eggs (diameter 1.2-1.7 mm) are laid in mostly elongate capsules of 8–15 mm width, each strain containing 12-40 eggs, fixed to aquatic plants, embryos are reddish with transparent shells, juveniles hatch after 14–16 days, life span up to 3 years. Self-fertilization is possible, one single released animal can establish a stable population, but only 5% of the juveniles in self-fertilized eggs will hatch.

== Parasites ==
This species of snail functions as a host for several parasite species:

- First intermediate host for Prosthogonimus ovatus
- First intermediate host for Apatemon gracilis
- First and as second intermediate host for Hypoderaeum conoideum
- Intermediate host for Syngamus trachea
- Intermediate host for Typhlocoelum sisowi

== As aquarium pets ==
P. corneus are available from commercial breeders, and they are easy to keep, as they do not need a minimum aquarium size, do not need heating, and likewise, the tank usually does not need to be oxygenated – though it helps to supply the microorganisms that process snail manure and food leftovers. They are said to only feed on living plants when other food sources (like algae and plant detritus) have become rare. They need calcium-rich water, so depending on the water source, they need additional calcium from cuttlebones or ground egg shells. The snails can be fed with any fish food, and vegetables like spinach leaves, green lettuce leaves and zucchini slices. In case of leafy or vegetable food, leftovers should be quickly removed in order to keep ammonium and nitrate levels low. Depending on the locale, a water conditioner is needed to remove copper, chlorine and other harmful ions from the water. Poor water quality may cause the animals to leave the water to escape.

The species has been recorded to eat the leaves of water lilies in captivity, though this seems to be a rare occurrence, and may benefit from the inclusion of aquarium plants. The species has been recorded to create slimy threads that allow it to climb and descend vertically in the water column, though it has also been observed to have great buoyancy control without the threads.

Both the European-Asian P. corneus and the smaller, North-American Planorbella duryi are known as "Ramshorn snails" in the aquarium trade and can be kept the same way, yet the adult Planorbella ones are significantly smaller, and their shells are smooth, shining and not striated.

== Sources ==
This article incorporates text from a free content work. Licensed under CC BY-SA (license statement/permission). Text taken from Species summary for Planorbarius corneus, F. Welter Schultes, Zoological Institute of the University of Göttingen. AnimalBase.
