= Prosthogonimus =

Scientific classification
- Kingdom: Animalia
- Phylum: Platyhelminthes
- Class: Trematoda
- Order: Plagiorchiida
- Family: Prosthogonimidae
- Genus: Prosthogonimus; Lühe, 1899

Genus of flukes

Prosthogonimus is a genus of trematodes belonging to the family Prosthogonimidae.

The species of this genus are found in Europe, Northern America, Southeastern Asia, Australia.

Species:

- Prosthogonimus anatinus Markov, 1903
- Prosthogonimus crecci Bhutta & Khan, 1975
- Prosthogonimus cuneatus (Rudolphi, 1809)
- Prosthogonimus dollfusi Jaiswal, 1957
- Prosthogonimus gracilis Skrjabin, 1941
- Prosthogonimus guiyangensis K.u.Chin, 1976
- Prosthogonimus hyderabadensis Jaiswal, 1957
- Prosthogonimus ketupi Jaiswal, 1957
- Prosthogonimus limani Gnedina, 1941
- Prosthogonimus longus Seifreid, 1924
- Prosthogonimus macrorchis Macy, 1934
- Prosthogonimus malaysiae Fischthal & Kuntz, 1973
- Prosthogonimus mesolecithus Jaiswal, 1957
- Prosthogonimus orientalis Yamaguti, 1933
- Prosthogonimus ovatus (Rudolphi, 1803)
- Prosthogonimus pellucidus (von Linstow, 1873)
- Prosthogonimus querquedulae Yamaguti, 1933
- Prosthogonimus robdollfusi Anantaraman, 1966
- Prosthogonimus ryjikowi Ablasov, 1955
- Prosthogonimus singhi Jaiswal, 1957
- Prosthogonimus skrjabini Zakharov, 1920
- Prosthogonimus sobolevi Leonov & Belogurov, 1963
- Prosthogonimus vitellatus Nicoll, 1914
- Schistogonimus rarus (Braun, 1901)
