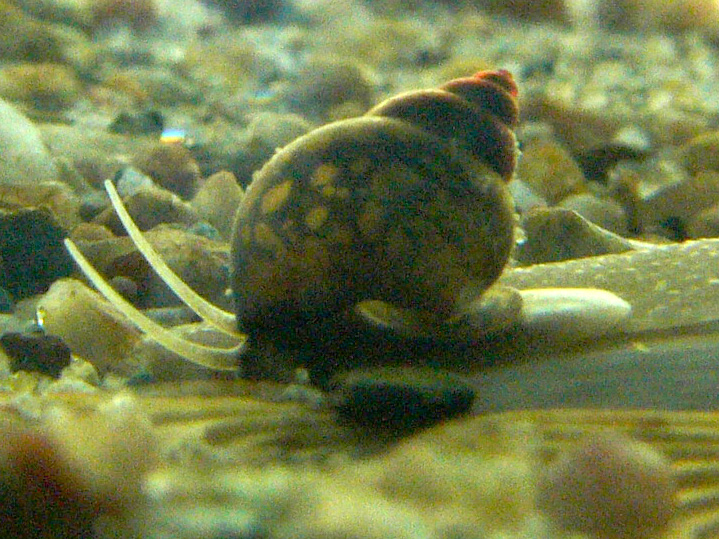
- Left side view of a live Bithynia tentaculata

Conservation status
- Least Concern (IUCN 3.1)

- Secure (NatureServe)

Scientific classification
- Kingdom: Animalia
- Phylum: Mollusca
- Class: Gastropoda
- Subclass: Caenogastropoda
- Order: Littorinimorpha
- Superfamily: Truncatelloidea
- Family: Bithyniidae
- Genus: Bithynia
- Species: B. tentaculata

Binomial name
- Bithynia tentaculata (Linnaeus, 1758)

Synonyms
- Amnicola (Amnicola) meridionalis (von Frauenfeld, 1862); Bithinia tentaculata Linnaeus, 1758; Bithinia tentaculata var. gigas Mörch, 1864; Bithinia tentaculata var. pellucida Wattebled, 1889; Bithynia (Bithynia) curta (Garnier, 1840); Bithynia (Bithynia) decipiens (Millet, 1813); Bithynia (Bithynia) producta Moquin-Tandon, 1856; Bithynia (Bithynia) tentaculata (Linnaeus, 1758); Bithynia (Milletelona) decipiens Millet, 1843; Bithynia decipiens (Millet, 1843); Bithynia hambergerae Reischütz, Reischütz & Reischütz, 2008; Bithynia majewskyi von Frauenfeld, 1862; Bithynia meridionalis von Frauenfeld, 1862; Bithynia producta Moquin-Tandon, 1856; Bithynia tentaculata var. producta Moquin-Tandon, 1856; Bulimus tentaculatus (Linnaeus, 1758); Bulimus tentaculatus var. magnalacustris Baker, 1928; Bythinia allopoma Westerlund, 1886; Bythinia ardussonica Ray, 1884; Bythinia gravida Ray, 1884; Bythinia parva Locard, 1893; Bythinia potamica Locard, 1893; Bythinia sebethina Coutagne, 1881; Bythinia stramicensis Locard, 1893; Bythinia tentaculata Linnaeus, 1758; Bythinia tentaculata var. bottnica Clessin, 1878; Bythinia tentaculata var. decollata Jeffreys, 1862; Bythinia tentaculata var. excavata Jeffreys, 1862; Cyclostoma impurum Draparnaud, 1801; Helix tentaculata Linnaeus, 1758; Nerita jaculator Müller, 1774; Nerita jaculatrix Schrank, 1803; Paludina decipiens Millet, 1843; Paludina impura (Draparnaud, 1801); Paludina impura var. curta Picard, 1840; Paludina impura var. producta Menke, 1830; Turbo janitor Vallot, 1801; Turbo nucleus da Costa, 1778

= Bithynia tentaculata =

Species of gastropod

Bithynia tentaculata, common names the mud bithynia, common bithynia, or faucet snail is a relatively small species of freshwater snail in the family Bithyniidae.

== Taxonomy ==
Bithynia tentaculata is the type species of the genus Bithynia.

Forms of Bithynia tentaculata include:

- Bithynia tentaculata f. codia
- Bithynia tentaculata f. excavata
- Bithynia tentaculata f. gigas
- Bithynia tentaculata f. producta Menke, 1828
- † Bithynia tentaculata tellinii Sacco, 1886

The variety † Bithynia tentaculata var. allobrogica Fontannes, 1881: synonym of † Bithynia minor Locard, 1878

== Distribution ==
=== Indigenous distribution ===
The distribution of Bithynia tentaculata is Palearctic. The species occurs in:

Northern Europe:

- Scandinavia

Central Europe:

- Czech Republic – least concern (LC)
- Germany – common species overall in Germany, but is listed as endangered (gefährdet) in Saxony and in Thuringia
- Poland
- Slovakia

Western Europe:

- British Isles: Great Britain and Ireland
- Netherlands

Eastern Europe:

- Ukraine

Southeastern Europe:

- Bulgaria – There is southern distribution border of Bithynia tentaculata in northern Bulgaria.
- Croatia

Bithynia tentaculata has been mentioned from Greece, but it does not occur there. It probably does not occur in Turkey and in Iran.

=== Nonindigenous distribution ===
Bithynia tentaculata is nonindigenous in the United States and in Canada.

Great Lakes Region: Bithynia tentaculata was first recorded in Lake Michigan in 1871, but was probably introduced in 1870. It spread to Lake Ontario by 1879, the Hudson River by 1892, and other tributaries and water bodies in the Finger Lakes region during the 20th century. It was introduced to Lake Erie sometime before 1930. This snail's range extends in 1992 from Quebec and Wisconsin to Pennsylvania and New York. It has been recorded from Lake Huron, but only a few individuals were found in benthic samples from Saginaw Bay in the 1980s and 1990s.

In the Mid-Atlantic Region it is found in Lake Champlain and is widespread across New York, south to the Potomac River in Virginia. It is established in the Chesapeake Bay, Maryland.

== Description ==
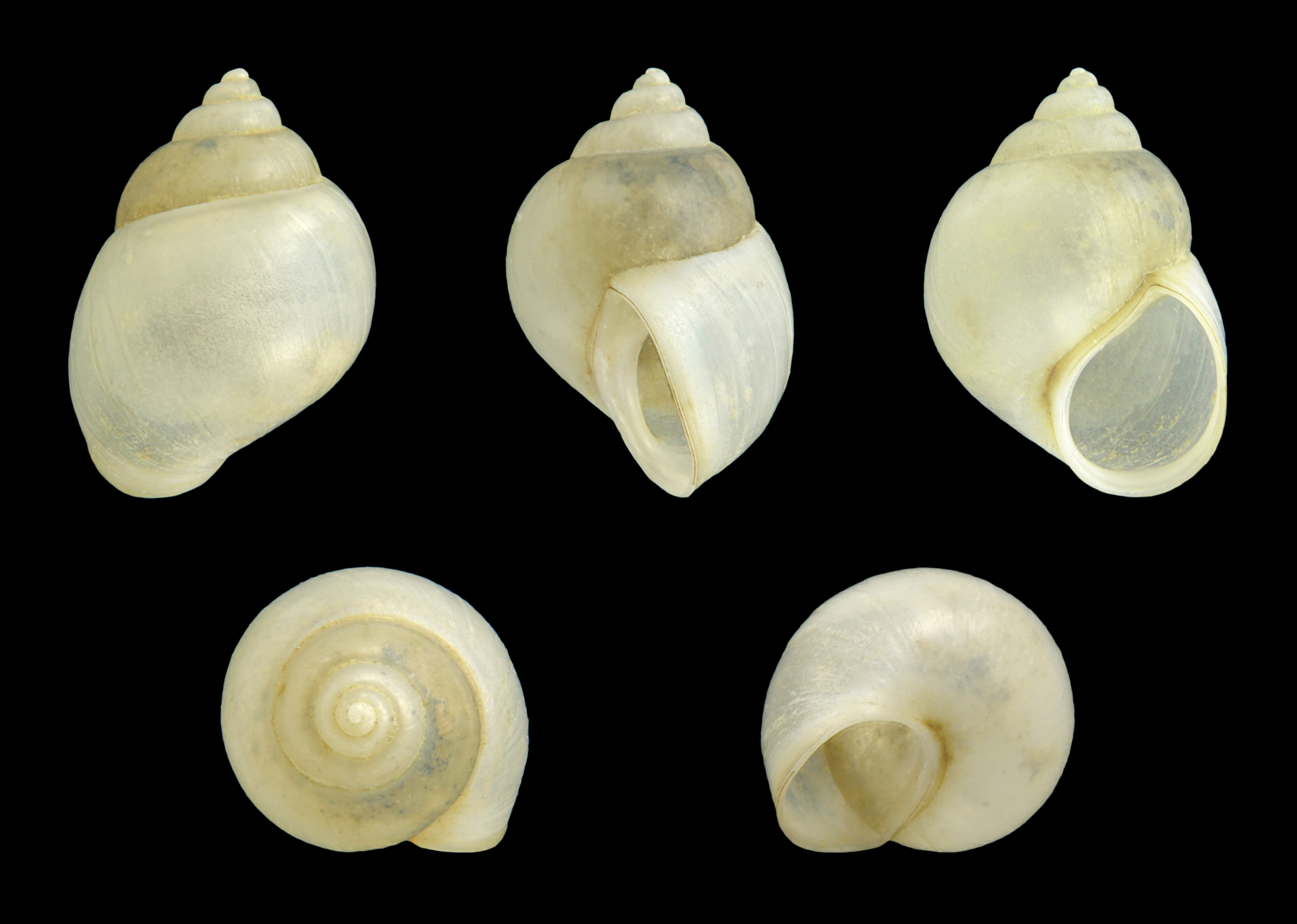
A shell of Bithynia tentaculata

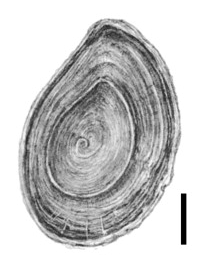
Operculum of Bithynia tentaculata

The height of shell is usually no larger than 12–15 mm. The snail is sexually mature by the time the height of shell reaches 8 mm in size.

The width of the shell is 5–7 mm.

The faucet snail has a shiny pale brown shell, oval in shape, with a relatively large and rounded spire consisting of 5–6 somewhat flattened whorls, no umbilicus, and a very thick lip. The aperture is less than half the height of the shell.

Adult Bithynia tentaculata possess a white, calcareous, tear-drop to oval-shaped operculum with distinct concentric rings. The operculum of juveniles, however, is spirally marked. The operculum (on the back of the foot) is always situated very close to the aperture of the shell. The animal itself has pointed, long tentacles and a simple foot with the right cervical lobe acting as a channel for water.

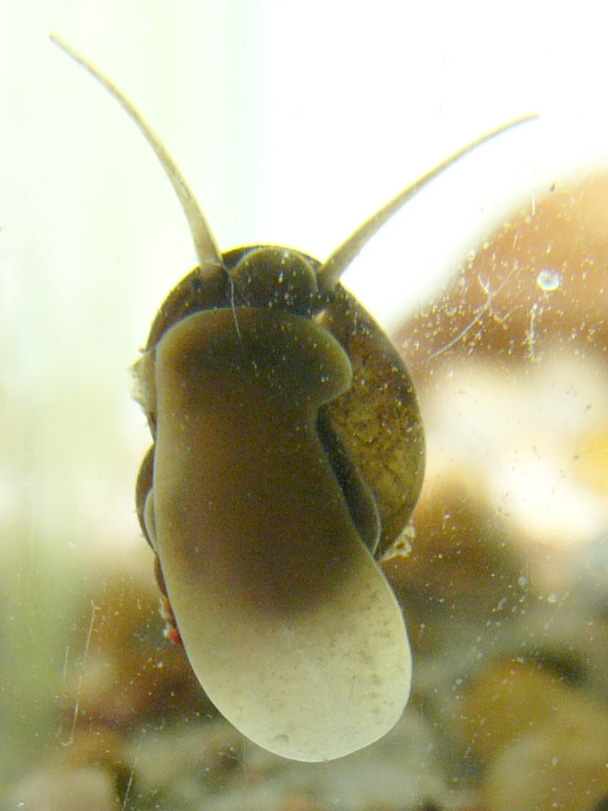
Foot of Bithynia tentaculata

== Ecology ==
=== Habitat ===
This snail lives in slow-running freshwater habitat such as low-velocity rivers, and standing-water bodies such as lakes. The species flourishes in calcium-rich waters.

It is commonly found in freshwater ponds, shallow lakes, and canals. This species is found on the substrate in fall and winter (including gravel, sand, clay, mud or undersides of rocks) and on aquatic macrophytes (including milfoil, Myriophyllum spicatum and muskgrass, Chara spp.) in warmer months. It lives mostly in shoals, but is also found at depths of up to 5 m. Bithynia tentaculata inhabits intertidal zones in the Hudson River But in general, this snail inhabits waters with pH of 6.6–8.4, conductivity of 87–2320 μmhos/cm, Ca^{2+} of 5–89 ppm, and Na^{+} of 4–291 ppm. It can potentially survive well in water bodies with high concentrations of K^{+} and low concentrations of NO_{3}^{−}. In the Saint Lawrence River, it tends to occur in relatively unpolluted, nearshore areas and amongst dreissenid mussel beds.

=== Feeding habits ===
This species functions as both a scraper and a collector-filterer, grazing on algae on the substrate, as well as using its gills to filter suspended algae from the water column. When filter feeding, algae is sucked in, condensed, and then passed out between the right tentacle and exhalant siphon in pellet-like packages which are then eaten. The ability to filter feed may play a role in allowing populations of the faucet snail to survive at high densities in relatively eutrophic, anthropogenically influenced water bodies. Bithynia tentaculata feeds selectively on food items. The faucet snail is known in Eurasia to feed on black fly larvae.

=== Life cycle ===
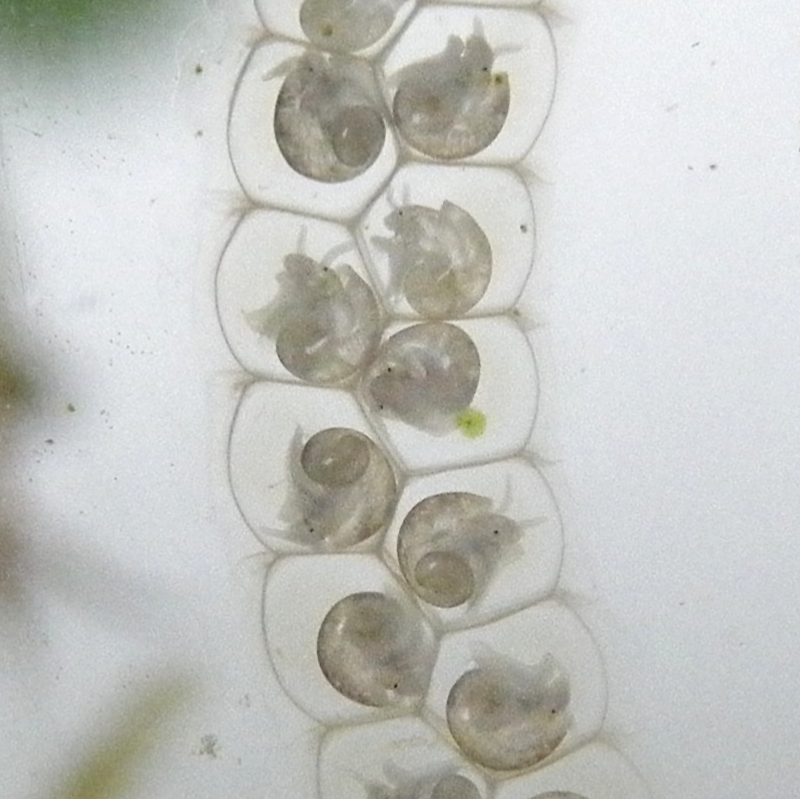
Egg capsules of Bithynia tentaculata with gastropods shortly before hatching.

Bithynia tentaculata is dioecious (it has two separate sexes) and lays its eggs on rocks, wood and shells in organized aggregates arranged in double rows, in clumps of 1 to 77. Egg-laying occurs from May to July when water temperature is 20 °C (68 °F) or higher, and sometimes a second time in October and November by females born early in the year. The density of eggs on the substrate can sometimes reach 155 clumps/m^{2} (14.4 clumps/sq ft). Fecundity may reach up to 347 eggs and is greatest for the 2nd year class. Eggs hatch in three weeks to three months, depending on water temperature. Oocytes develop poorly at temperatures of 30 to 34 °C (86 to 93 °F). Growth usually does not occur from September to May. The lifespan varies regionally and can be anywhere from 17 to 39 months.

The faucet snail has the potential to be a good biomonitor for contaminants such as Cd, Zn, and methylmercury (MeHg) because there are good correlations between environmental concentrations and snail tissue concentrations with respect to these toxic compounds.

=== Parasites ===
In its native Eurasian habitat, the faucet snail is host to many different species of digeneans, cercariae, metacercariae, cysticercoids, and other parasites.

- As first intermediate host for Prosthogonimus ovatus
- As an intermediate host for Sphaeridiotrema globulus
- As first intermediate hosts and as second intermediate host for Cyanthocotyle bushiensis.
- As second intermediate host for Echinostoma revolutum
- As intermediate host for Syngamus trachea
- Capillariidae, probably Capillaria obsignata
- Bithynia tenataculata is a suspected intermediate host for Leyogonimus polyoon

Parasites of Bithynia tentaculata include trematode Aspidogaster conchicola.

=== Other interspecific relationship ===
Natural dispersal of this snail is known to occur by passive transport in birds.

Bithynia tentaculata is capable of detecting the presence of molluscivorous leeches through chemoreception and of closing its operculum to avoid predation.
