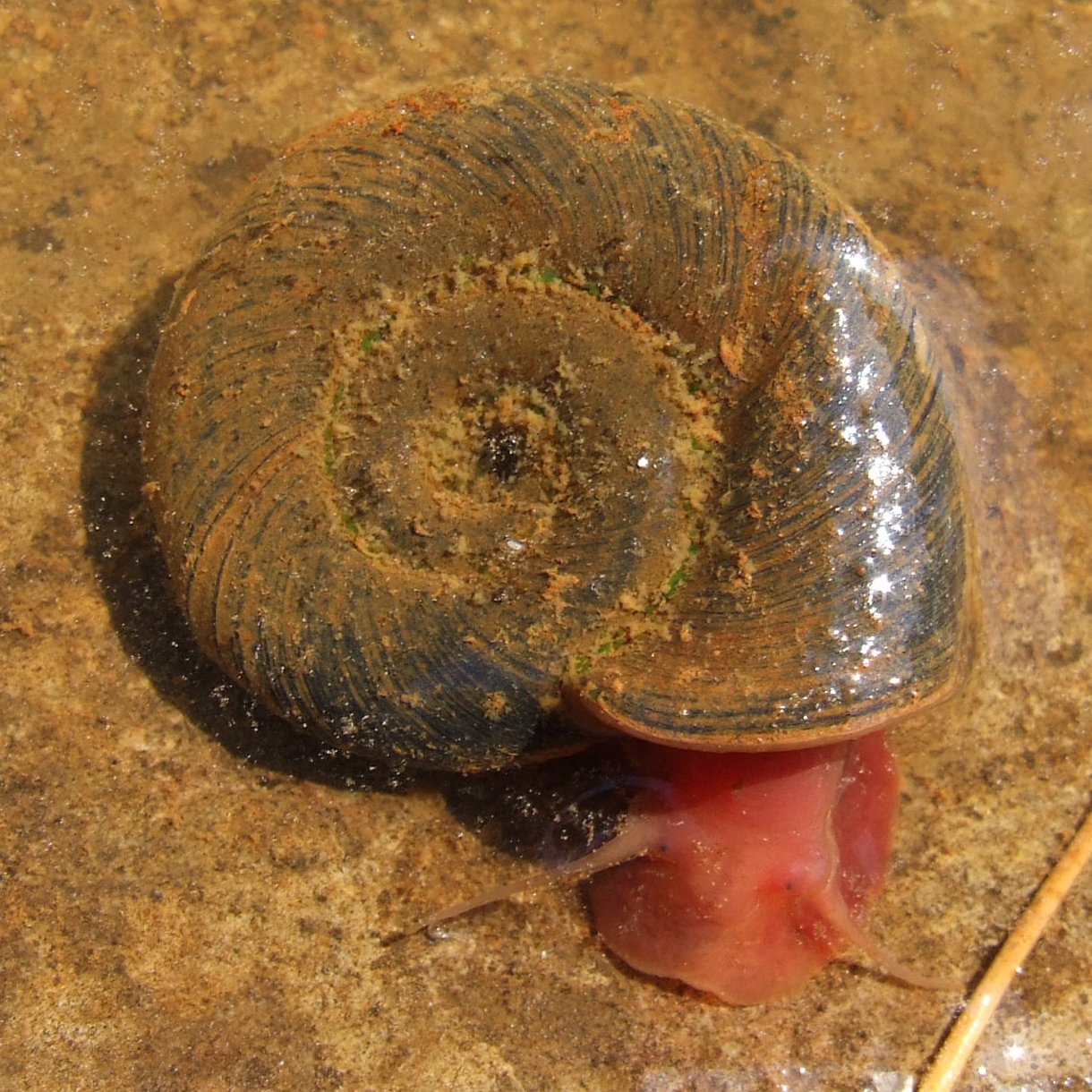
- A live individual of Planorbarius corneus carrying the shell with the umbilicus uppermost as normal

Scientific classification
- Kingdom: Animalia
- Phylum: Mollusca
- Class: Gastropoda
- Superorder: Hygrophila
- Family: Planorbidae
- Subfamily: Planorbinae
- Tribe: Coretini
- Genus: Planorbarius; Duméril, 1806

Type species
- Planorbarius corneus (Linnaeus, 1758)

Species
- See text

Synonyms
- Coretus Gray, 1847; (junior synonym); Planorbis (Deserticoretus) Starobogatov, 1990; (junior synonym); Planorbis (Coretus) Gray, 1847; (junior synonym); Planorbis (Corneana) Servain, 1888; (junior subjective synonym); Planorbis (Spirodiscus) Stein, 1850; (junior homonym of Spirodiscus Ehrenberg, 1830)

= Planorbarius =

Genus of gastropods

Planorbarius is a genus of air-breathing freshwater snails, aquatic pulmonate gastropod mollusks in the family Planorbidae (the ramshorn snails), which all have sinistral or left-coiling shells.

== Description ==
All species within family Planorbidae have sinistral shells.

Many species in this genus have been found to be diploid with 18 pairs, or 36 total, chromosomes. Differences in chromosomal length and other indicators were not different enough to distinguish individual species.

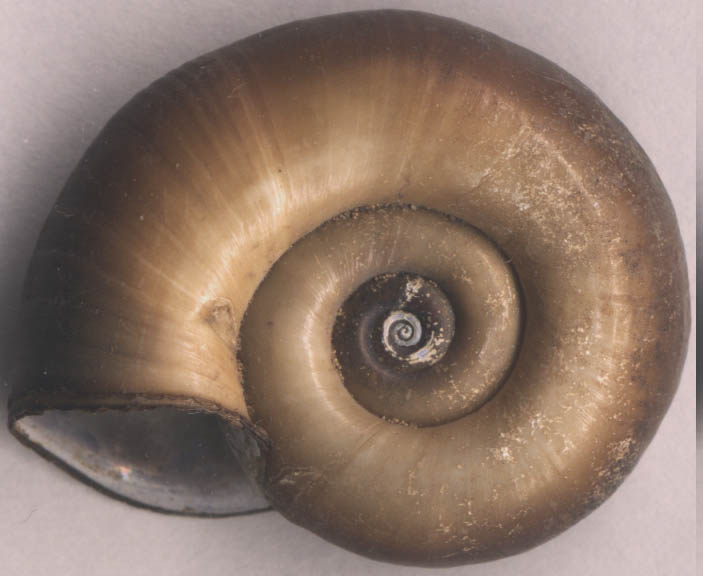
Planorbarius corneus. View of the sunken spire (held facing downwards in life)

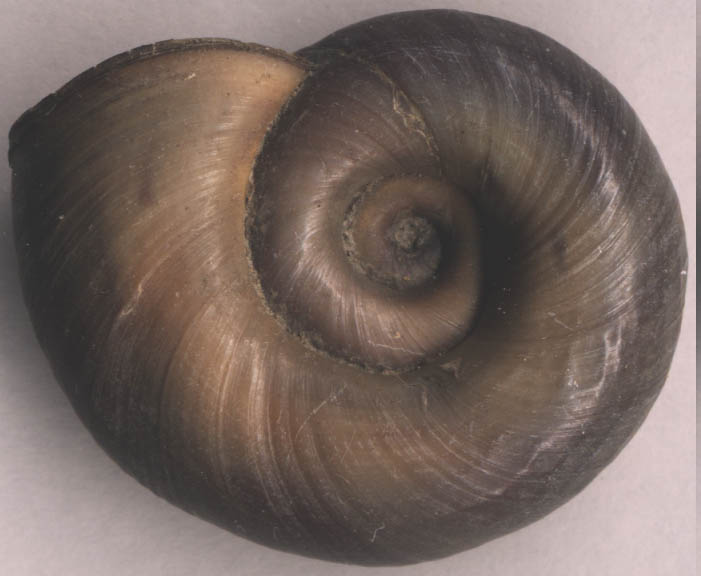
Planorbarius corneus. View of umbilicus (held uppermost in life)

== Species ==
Species within this genus include:

Extant

- Planorbarius arabatzis Reischütz, Reischütz, & Fischer, 2008
- Planorbarius corneus (Linnaeus, 1758)
- Planorbarius grandis (Dunker, 1850)
- Planorbarius metidjensis (Forbes, 1838)
- Planorbarius scoliostoma (Westerlund, 1898)

Extinct

- † Planorbarius alcalensis (Jodot, 1958)
- † Planorbatius ammonitiformis (de Serres, 1844)
- † Planorbarius ampullus Tolstikova, 1979
- † Planorbarius barettii (Sacco, 1886)
- † Planorbarius belnesis (Tornouër, 1866)
- † Planorbarius boniliensis (Fontannes, 1892)
- † Planorbarius borellii (Brusina, 1892)
- † Planorbarius calcareus Tolstikova, 1979
- † Planorbarius choffati (Maillard, 1886)
- † Planorbarius cornu (Brongniart, 1810)
- † Planorbarius cornucopia (Baily, 1858)
- † Planorbarius crassus (Serres, 1844)
- † Planorbarius garsdorfensis Schlickum & Strauch, 1979
- † Planorbarius goupouensis Li, 1984
- † Planorbarius halavatsi Neubauer, Harzhauser, Kroh, Georgopoulou & Mandic, 2014
- † Planorbarius heriacensis (Fontannes, 1876)
- † Planorbarius incrassatus (Rambur, 1862)
- † Planorbarius isseli (Sacco, 1886)
- † Planorbarius jobae (Bourguignat, 1862)
- † Planorbarius junci Marquet, Lenaerts, Karnekamp, & Smith, 2008
- † Planorbarius landonensis (Dollfus, 1906)
- † Planorbarius major (Blanckenhorn, 1897)
- † Planorbarius mantelli (Dunker, 1848)
- † Planorbarius margoi (Lörenthey, 1894)
- † Planorbarius mongolicus Popova, 1981
- † Planorbarius peetersi Meijer, 1990
- † Planorbarius philippei (Locard, 1883)
- † Planorbarius praecorneus (Fischer & Tournouër, 1873)
- † Planorbarius reticulatus Roshka, 1973
- † Planorbarius romani (Jodot, 1958)
- † Planorbarius royoi (Jodot, 1958)
- † Planorbarius sansaniensis (Noulet, 1854)
- † Planorbarius solidus (Thomä, 1845)
- † Planorbarius striatus Roshka, 1973
- † Planorbarius subalbus (Martinson, 1954)
- † Planorbarius subdiscus Yü & Pan, 1982
- † Planorbarius sulekianus (Brusina, 1874)
- † Planorbarius thiollieri (Michaud, 1855)
- † Planorbarius turkovici (Gorjanović-Kramberger, 1899)
- † Planorbarius vezici (Brusina, 1897)
- † Planorbarius vialai (Saporta, 1889)
- † Planorbarius villatoyensis (Jodot, 1958)
- † Planorbarius yidouensis Li, 1987

Uncertain (Taxon Inquirendum)

- Planorbarius adelosius (Bourguignat, 1859)
- Planorbarius banaticus (Dunker, 1850)

Species brought into synonymy (Selection)

- † Planorbarius borelli (Brusina, 1892): synonym of † Planorbarius borellii (Brusina, 1892)
- † Planorbarius cornus (Brongniart, 1810): synonym of † Planorbarius cornu (Brongniart, 1810)
- † Planorbarius grandis (Halaváts, 1903): synonym of † Planorbarius halavatsi Neubauer, Harzhauser, Kroh, Georgopoulou & Mandic, 2014
- † Planorbarius thiollierei (Michaud, 1855): synonym of † Planorbarius thiollieri (Michaud, 1855)
