= Planorbarius arabatzis =

Conservation status
- Endangered (IUCN 3.1)

Scientific classification
- Kingdom: Animalia
- Phylum: Mollusca
- Class: Gastropoda
- Superorder: Hygrophila
- Family: Planorbidae
- Genus: Planorbarius
- Species: P. arabatzis

Binomial name
- Planorbarius arabatzis (A. Reischütz, P. L. Reischütz & W. Fischer, 2008)

Synonyms
- Planorbarius corneus arabatzis A. Reischütz, P. L. Reischütz & W. Fischer, 2008

Species of gastropod

Planorbarius arabatzis is a species of planorbid snail endemic to the Great Prespa Lake in the Balkans.

== Taxonomy ==
Planorbarius arabatzis was originally described as Planorbarius corneus arabatzis, a subspecies of Planorbarius corneus. It was named after Vasilis Arabatzis, who was a friend of the original authors. It is unclear if P. arabatzis is a separate species from P. corneus.

== Description ==
Planorbarius arabatzis is distinct from Planorbarius corneus by the smaller, more flared shell with fewer whorls. In P. arabatzis, the brown shell is about 16 mm (0.63 in) in width, and 12.4 mm (0.49 in) in height. The aperture is oval-shaped and measures about 9.7 by 8.3 mm (0.38 by 0.33 in). There are between 4–5 whorls.

== Distribution and habitat ==
Planorbarius arabatzis is only known from the larger of the two Prespa Lakes, though its range may extend to the other since they share a water connection. The estimated area of this habitat is about 361 km^{2} (139 mi^{2}), though only 20 km^{2} (7.7 mi^{2}) is actually used. Its habitat consists of large gravel and reeds, which it shares with other gastropod species. It may be found at depths of up to 1 m (3.3 ft).

The habitat of this species is declining in quality due to a number of factors, including eutrophication, drought, pesticide usage, dams, and more.
