= Planorbarius grandis =

Scientific classification
- Kingdom: Animalia
- Phylum: Mollusca
- Class: Gastropoda
- Superorder: Hygrophila
- Family: Planorbidae
- Genus: Planorbarius
- Species: P. grandis

Binomial name
- Planorbarius grandis (Dunker, 1850)

Synonyms
- Planorbarius (Deserticoretus) stenostoma (Bourguignat,1882); junior subjective synonym; Planorbarius corneus grandis (Dunker, 1850); superseded rank; Planorbarius stenostoma (Bourguignat,1882); junior synonym; Planorbis grandis Dunker, 1850; superseded combination; Planorbis inflatus Dunker, 1848; junior homonym; Planorbis stenostoma Bourguignat,1882; junior subjective synonym

Species of gastropod

Planorbarius grandis is a species of freshwater gastropod in the family Planorbidae.

== Taxonomy ==
Planorbarius grandis was originally described as Planorbis grandis by Wilhelm Dunker in 1850. Dunker did not know where the specimens he described came from, so there is no type locality. Some sources do not recognize the legitimacy of this species, instead regarding it as a junior synonym of Planorbarius corneus.

== Description ==
Planorbarius grandis has a large shell with about 4 whorls, or revolutions.The whorls are convex and increase in size rapidly with each successive whorl. The shell opening, called the aperture, is shaped like a kidney.

(Original description in German) The shell is large and uncommonly ventricose (or bulging), it is quite glossy, and it is finely striated (or grooved) with 4 very inflated whorls, which are separated by a deep suture and are much higher than they are wide. The shell is deeply umbilicate at the top with a hidden protoconch, [and it is] concave below, showing the entire spire right into the center.

It is very similar in appearance to Planorbarius corneus, and very few differences between the two have been found.

== Distribution and habitat ==
Planorbarius grandis can be found in Europe, and has been recorded in the basin of the Danube River, as well as around Transylvania, the Black Sea and Baltic Sea. Reports of this species extending into Southern Europe and Western Siberia also exist. Its distribution may be similar to that of Planorbis corneus.
