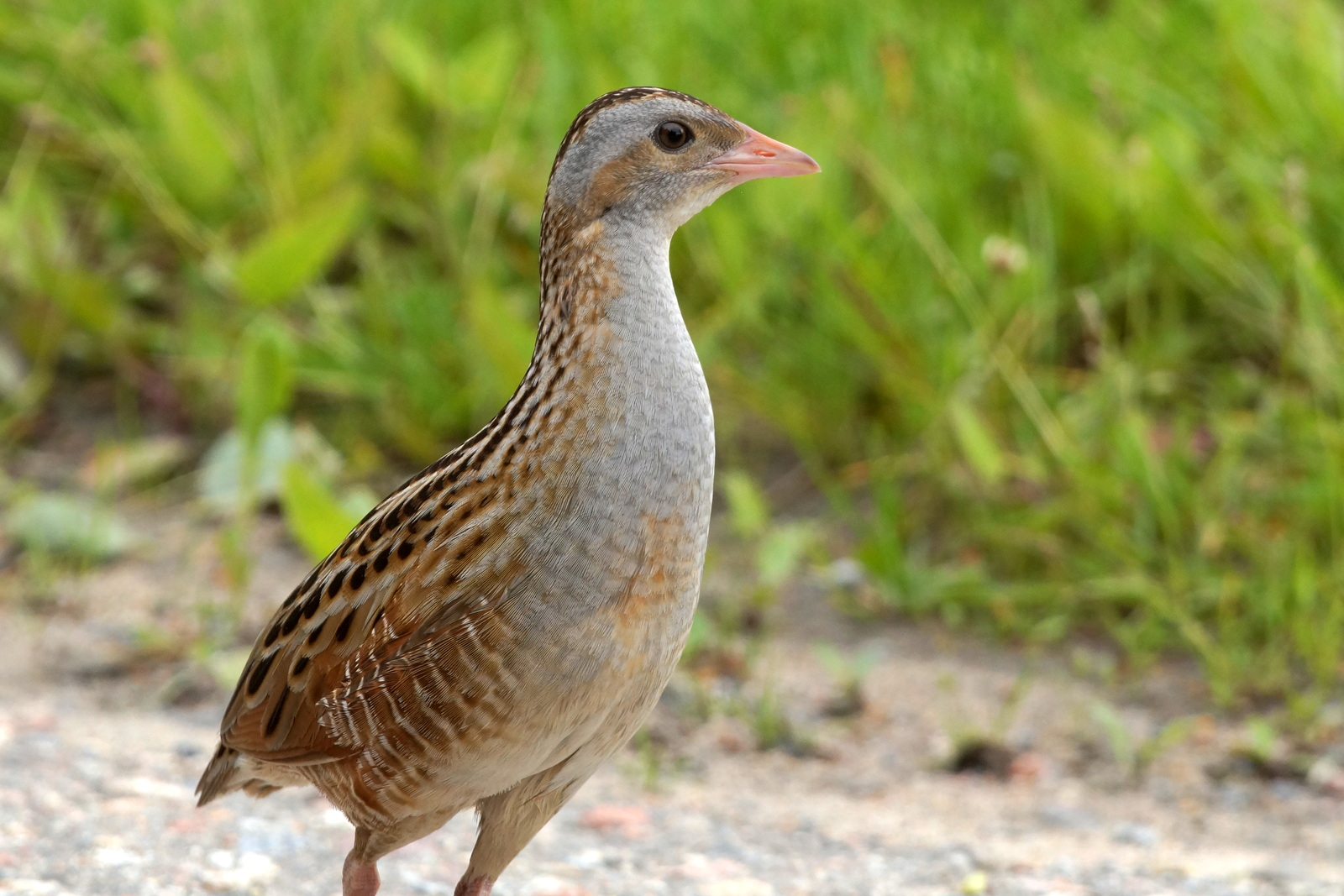

Conservation status
- Least Concern (IUCN 3.1)

Scientific classification
- Kingdom: Animalia
- Phylum: Chordata
- Class: Aves
- Order: Gruiformes
- Family: Rallidae
- Genus: Crex; Bechstein, 1803
- Species: C. crex

Binomial name
- Crex crex (Linnaeus, 1758)
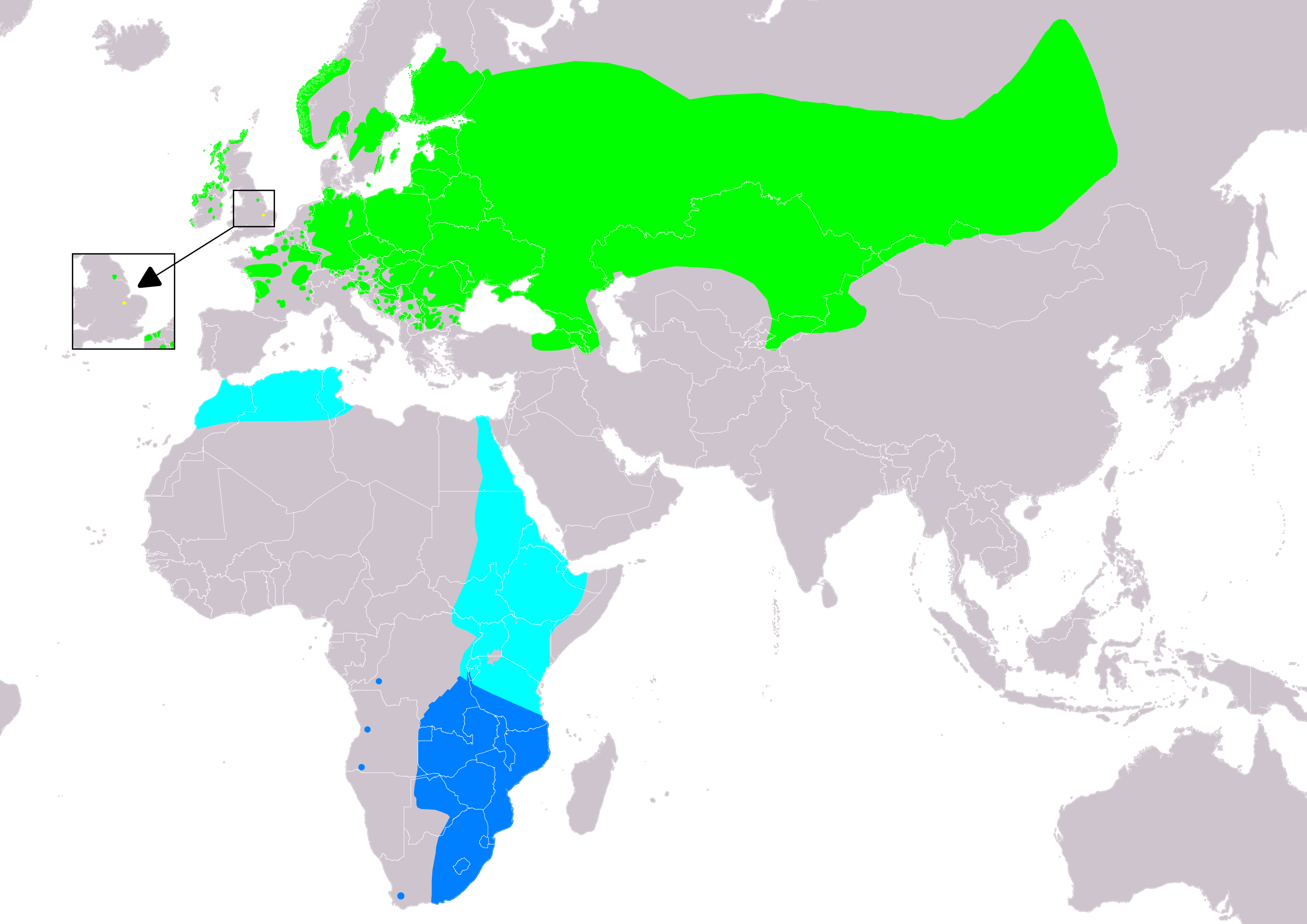
- Range of C. crex Breeding Passage Non-breeding Extant & Reintroduced (breeding)

Synonyms
- Rallus crex Linnaeus, 1758; Crex pratensis Bechstein, 1803

= Corn crake =

Species of bird found in Europe, Asia and Africa

The corn crake, corncrake or landrail (Crex crex) is a bird in the rail family. It breeds in Europe and Asia as far east as western China, and migrates to Africa for the Northern Hemisphere's winter. It is a medium-sized crake with buff- or grey-streaked brownish-black upperparts, chestnut markings on the wings, and blue-grey underparts with rust-coloured and white bars on the flanks and undertail. The strong bill is flesh-toned, the iris is pale brown, and the legs and feet are pale grey. Juveniles are similar in plumage to adults, and downy chicks are black, as with all rails. There are no subspecies, although individuals from the east of the breeding range tend to be slightly paler than their western counterparts. The male's call is a loud krek krek, from which the scientific name is derived. The corn crake is larger than its closest relative, the African crake, which shares its wintering range; that species is also darker-plumaged, and has a plainer face.

The corn crake's breeding habitat is grassland, particularly hayfields, and it uses similar environments on the wintering grounds. This secretive species builds a nest of grass leaves in a hollow in the ground and lays 6–14 cream-coloured eggs which are covered with rufous blotches. These hatch in 19–20 days, and the black precocial chicks fledge after about five weeks. This crake is in steep decline across much of its former breeding range because modern farming practices often destroy nests before breeding is completed. The corn crake is omnivorous but mainly feeds on invertebrates, the occasional small frog or mammal, and plant material including grass seed and cereal grain. Threats include dogs, cats, other introduced and feral mammals, large birds, various parasites and diseases.

Although numbers have declined steeply in western Europe, this bird is classed as least concern on the IUCN Red List because of its huge range and large, apparently stable, populations in Russia and Kazakhstan. Numbers in western China are more significant than previously thought, and conservation measures have facilitated an increased population in some countries which had suffered the greatest losses. Despite its elusive nature, the loud call has ensured the corn crake has been noted in literature, and garnered a range of local and dialect names.

== Taxonomy ==
The rails are a bird family comprising nearly 150 species. Although the origins of the group are lost in antiquity, the largest number of species and least specialised forms are found in the Old World, suggesting this family originated there. The taxonomy of the small crakes is complicated, but the closest relative of the corn crake is the African crake, which has been given its own genus, Crecopsis.

Corn crakes were first described by Carl Linnaeus in his 1758 10th edition of Systema Naturae as Rallus crex, but was subsequently moved to the genus Crex, created by German naturalist and ornithologist Johann Matthäus Bechstein in 1803, and named Crex pratensis. The earlier use of crex gives it priority over Bechstein's specific name pratensis, and leads to the current name of Crex crex. The binomial name, Crex crex, from the ancient Greek "κρεξ", is onomatopoeic, referring to the crake's repetitive grating call. The common name was formerly spelt as a single word, "corncrake", but the official version is now "corn crake". The English names refer to the species' habit of nesting in dry hay or cereal fields, rather than marshes used by most members of this family.

== Description ==
The corn crake is a medium-sized rail, 27–30 cm (11–12 in) long with a wingspan of 42–53 cm (17–21 in). Males weigh 165 g (5.8 oz) on average and females 145 g (5.1 oz). The adult male has the crown of its head and all of its upperparts brown-black in colour, streaked with buff or grey. The wing coverts are a distinctive chestnut colour with some white bars. The face, neck and breast are blue-grey, apart from a pale brown streak from the base of the bill to behind the eye, the belly is white, and the flanks, and undertail are barred with chestnut and white. The strong bill is flesh-coloured, the iris is pale brown, and the legs and feet are pale grey. Compared to the male, the female has warmer-toned upperparts and a narrower duller eye streak. Outside the breeding season, the upperparts of both sexes become darker and the underparts less grey. The juvenile is like the adult in appearance, but has a yellow tone to its upperparts, and the grey of the underparts is replaced with buff-brown. The chicks have black down, as with all rails. While there are no subspecies, all populations show great individual variation in colouring, and the birds gradually become paler and greyer towards the east of the range. Adults undergo a complete moult after breeding, which is normally finished by late August or early September, before migration to south eastern Africa. There is a pre-breeding partial moult prior to the return from Africa, mainly involving the plumage of the head, body and tail. Young birds have a head and body moult about five weeks after hatching.

The corn crake is sympatric with the African crake on the wintering grounds, but can be distinguished by its larger size, paler upperparts, tawny upperwing and different underparts pattern. In flight, it has longer, less rounded wings, and shallower wingbeats than its African relative, and shows a white leading edge to the inner wing. In both the breeding and wintering ranges it is unlikely to be confused with any other rails, since sympatric species are smaller, with white markings on the upperparts, different underparts patterns and shorter bills. A flying corn crake can resemble a gamebird, but its chestnut wing pattern and dangling legs are diagnostic.

=== Voice ===
Corn crake
Male's advertising call

On the breeding grounds, the male corn crake's advertising call is a loud, repetitive, grating krek krek normally delivered from a low perch with the bird's head and neck almost vertical and its bill wide open. The call can be heard from 1.5 km (0.93 mi) away, and serves to establish the breeding territory, attract females, and challenge intruding males. Slight differences in vocalisations mean that individual males can be distinguished by their calls. Early in the season, the call is given almost continuously at night, and often during the day, too. It may be repeated more than 20,000 times a night, with a peak between midnight and 3 am. The call has evolved to make a singing male's location clear, as this species hides in vegetation. The frequency of calling reduces after a few weeks but may intensify again near the end of the laying period before falling away towards the end of the breeding season. To attract males, mechanical imitations of their call can be produced by rubbing two pieces of wood or ribs, one of them with notches, or by flicking a credit card against a comb or zip-fastener. The male also has a growling call, given with the bill shut and used during aggressive interactions.

The female corn crake may give a call that is similar to that of the male; it also has a distinctive barking sound, similar in rhythm to the main call but without the grating quality. The female also has a high-pitched cheep call, and a oo-oo-oo sound to call the chick. The chicks make a quiet peeick-peeick contact call, and a chirp used to beg for food. Because of the difficulty in seeing this species, it is usually censused by counting males calling between 11 pm and 3 am; the birds do not move much at night, whereas they may wander up to 600 m (660 yd) during the day, which could lead to double-counting if monitored then. Identifying individual males suggests that just counting calling birds underestimates the true count by nearly 30%, and the discrepancy is likely to be greater, since only 80% of males may call at all on a given night. The corn crake is silent in Africa.

== Distribution and habitat ==
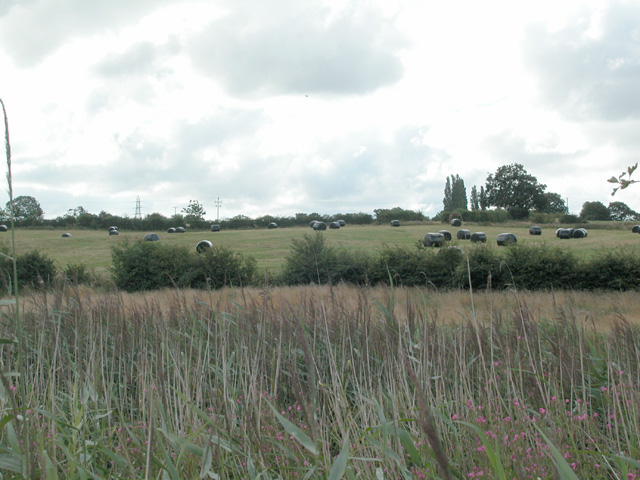
Hayfields are the preferred nesting habitat.

The corn crake breeds from Ireland east through Europe to central Siberia. Although it has vanished from much of its historic range, this bird was once found in suitable habitats in Eurasia everywhere between latitudes 41°N and 62°N. There is also a sizable population in western China, but this species nests only rarely in northern Spain and in Turkey. Old claims of breeding in South Africa are incorrect, and result from misidentification of eggs in a museum collection which are actually those of the African rail.

The corn crake winters mainly in Africa, from the Democratic Republic of the Congo and central Tanzania south to eastern South Africa. North of this area, it is mainly seen on migration, but occasionally winters in North Africa and to the west and north of its core area in southeast Africa. Most of the South African population of about 2,000 birds occurs in KwaZulu-Natal and the former Transvaal Province, and numbers elsewhere in Africa are uncertain. There are several nineteenth-century records, when populations were much higher than now, of birds being seen in western Europe, mainly Ireland and Britain, between December and February. 29 singing males were reported by the Royal Society for the Protection of Birds in Balranald Nature Reserve (North Uist, Scotland) in its 2025 Wildlife on Reserves report.

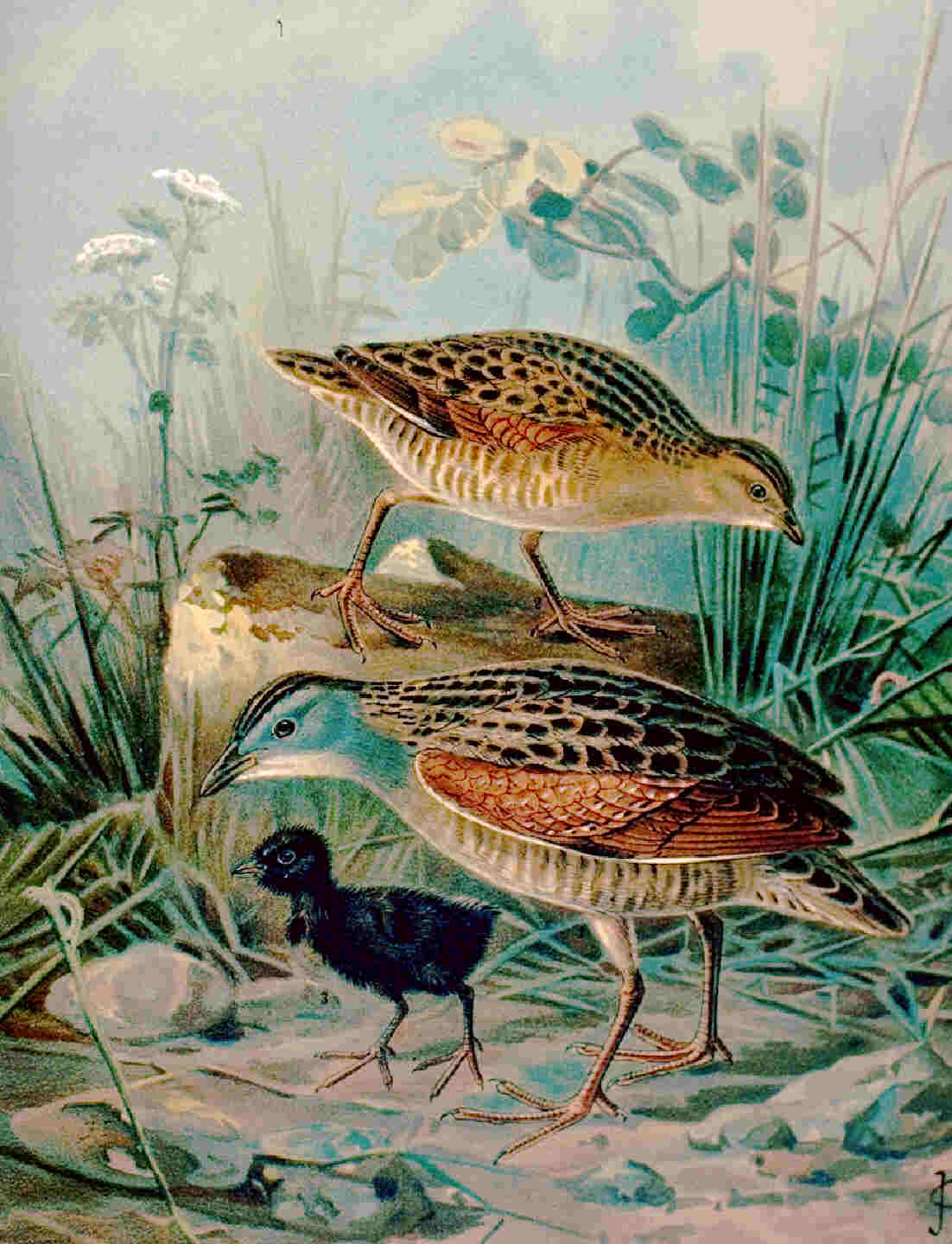
Adults and young

This crake migrates to Africa along two main routes: a western route through Morocco and Algeria, and a more important flyway through Egypt. On passage, it has been recorded in most countries between its breeding and wintering ranges, including much of West Africa. Birds from Coll following the western route paused in West Africa on their way further south, and again on the return flight, when they also rested in Spain or North Africa. Eastern migrants have been recorded in those parts of southern Asia that lie between the east of the breeding range and Africa. Further afield, the corn crake has been recorded as a vagrant to Sri Lanka, Vietnam and Australia, New Zealand, the Seychelles, Bermuda, Canada, the US, Greenland, Iceland, Brazil, the Faroe Islands, the Azores, Madeira, and the Canary Islands.

The corn crake is mainly a lowland species, but breeds up to 1,400 m (4,600 ft) altitude in the Alps, 2,700 m (8,900 ft) in China and 3,000 m (9,800 ft) in Russia. When breeding in Eurasia, the corn crake's habitats would originally have included river meadows with tall grass and meadow plants including sedges and irises. It is now mainly found in cool moist grassland used for the production of hay, particularly moist traditional farmland with limited cutting or fertiliser use. It also utilises other treeless grasslands in mountains or taiga, on coasts, or where created by fire. Moister areas like wetland edges may be used, but very wet habitats are avoided, as are open areas and those with vegetation more than 50 cm (20 in) tall, or too dense to walk through. The odd bush or hedge may be used as a calling post. Grassland which is not mown or grazed becomes too matted to be suitable for nesting, but locally-grown crops such as cereals, peas, rape, clover or potatoes may be used. After breeding, adults move to taller vegetation such as common reed, iris, or nettles to moult, returning to the hay and silage meadows for the second brood. In China, flax is also used for nest sites. Although males often sing in intensively managed grass or cereal crops, successful breeding is uncommon, and nests in the field margins or nearby fallow ground are more likely to succeed.

When wintering in Africa, the corn crake occupies dry grassland and savanna habitats, occurring in vegetation 30–200 cm (0.98–6.56 ft) tall, including seasonally burnt areas and occasionally sedges or reed beds. It is also found on fallow and abandoned fields, uncut grass on airfields, and the edges of crops. It occurs at up to at least 1,750 m (5,740 ft) altitude in South Africa. Each bird stays within a fairly small area. Although it sometimes occurs with the African crake, that species normally prefers moister and shorter grassland habitats than does the corn crake. On migration, the corn crake may also occur in wheatfields and around golf courses.

== Behaviour ==
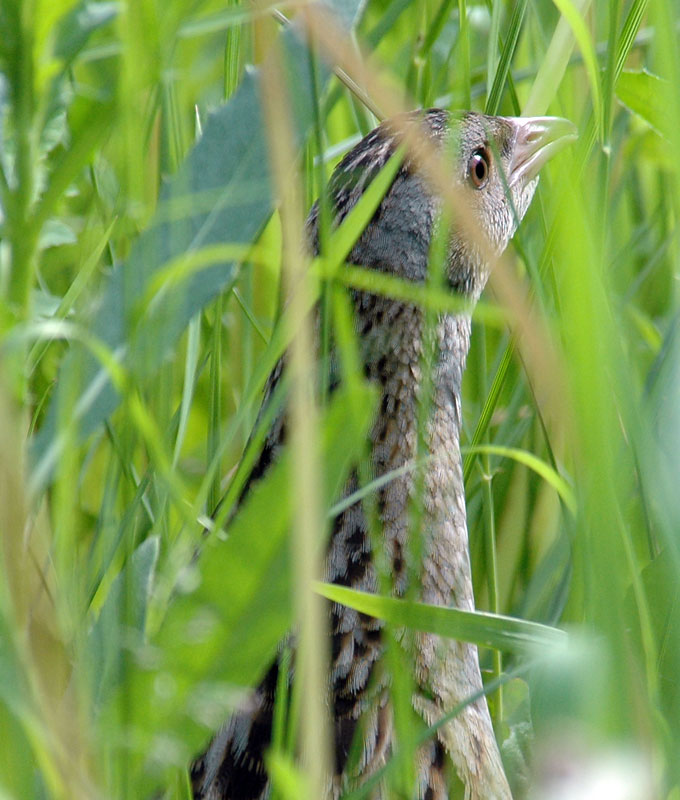
Adult corn crake camouflaged in a field (Russia, 2006)

The corn crake is a difficult bird to see in its breeding sites, usually being hidden by vegetation, but will sometimes emerge into the open. Occasionally, individuals may become very trusting; for five consecutive summers, an individual crake on the Scottish island of Tiree entered a kitchen to feed on scraps, and, in 1999, a wintering Barra bird would come for poultry feed once the chickens had finished. In Africa, it is more secretive than the African crake, and, unlike its relative, it is rarely seen in the open, although it occasionally feeds on tracks or road sides. The corn crake is most active early and late in the day, after heavy rain and during light rain. Its typical flight is weak and fluttering, although less so than that of the African crake. For longer flights, such as migration, it has a steadier, stronger action with legs drawn up. It walks with a high-stepping action, and can run swiftly through grass with its body held horizontal and laterally flattened. It will swim if essential. When flushed by a dog, it will fly less than 50 m (160 ft), frequently landing behind a bush or thicket, and then crouch on landing. If disturbed in the open, this crake will often run in a crouch for a short distance, with its neck stretched forward, then stand upright to watch the intruder. When captured it may feign death, recovering at once if it sees a way out.

The corn crake is solitary on the wintering grounds, where each bird occupies 4.2–4.9 ha (10–12 acres) at one time, although the total area used may be double that, since an individual may move locally due to flooding, plant growth, or grass cutting. Flocks of up to 40 birds may form on migration, sometimes associating with common quails. Migration takes place at night, and flocks resting during the day may aggregate to hundreds of birds at favoured sites. The ability to migrate is innate, not learned from adults. Chicks raised from birds kept in captivity for ten generations were able to migrate to Africa and return with similar success to wild-bred young.

=== Breeding ===
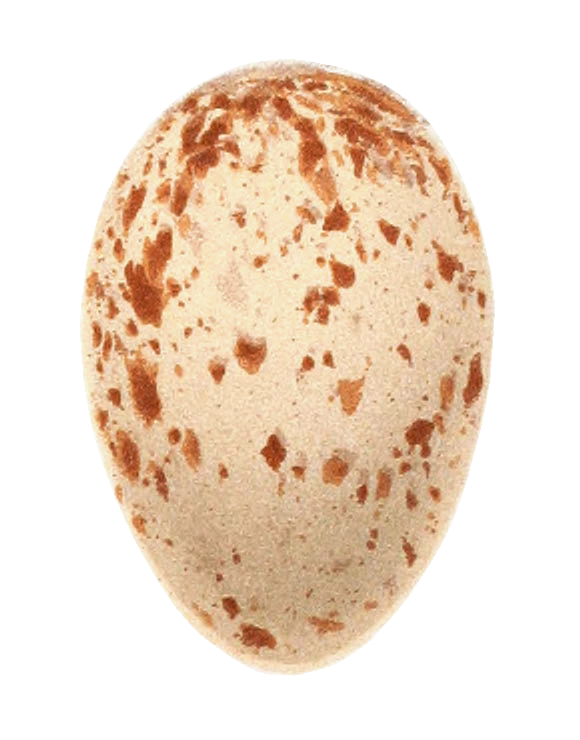
Painting of an egg

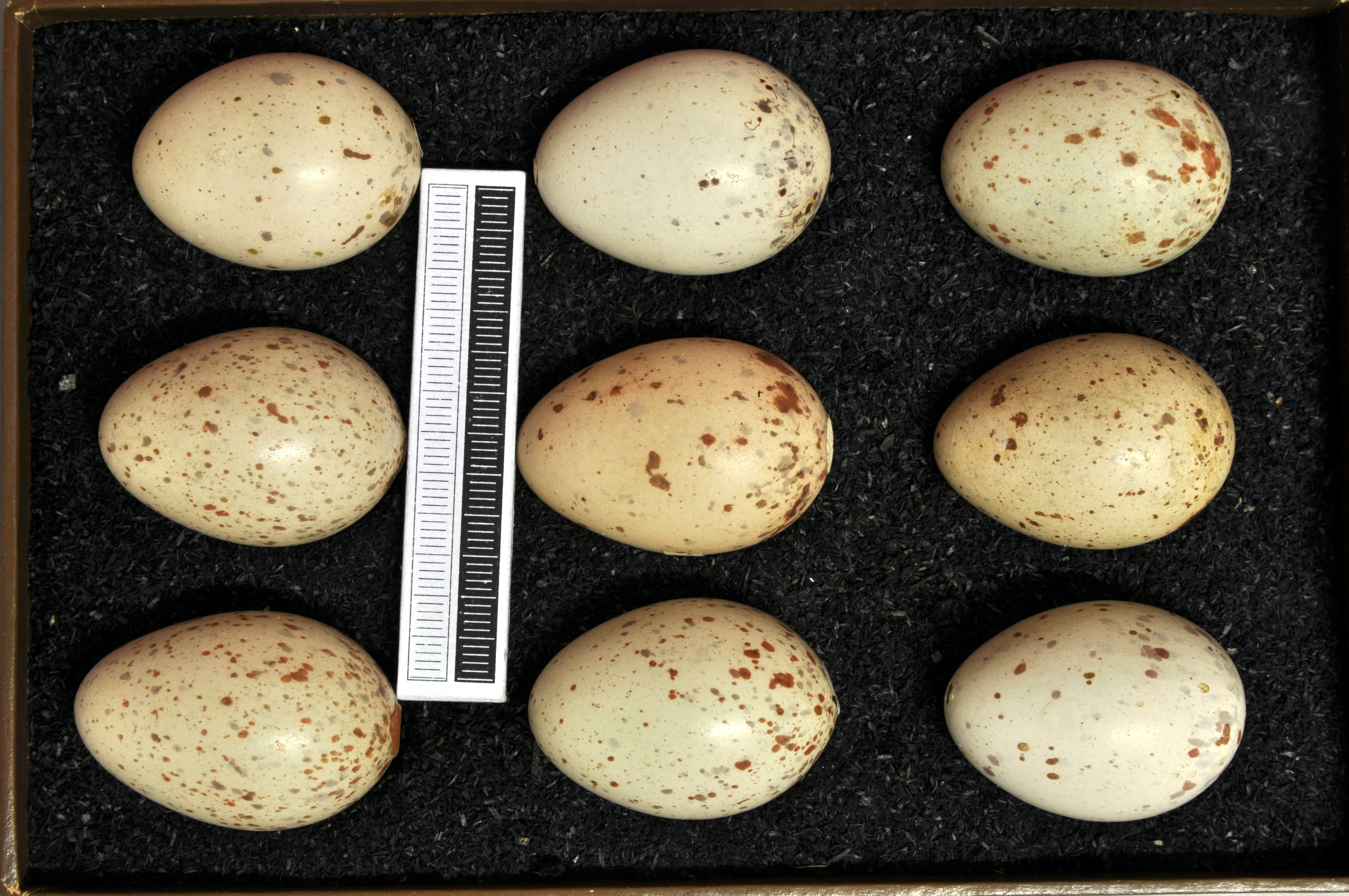
Collection of eggs in Museum Wiesbaden

Until 1995, it was assumed that the corn crake is monogamous, but it transpires that a male may have a shifting home range, and mate with two or more females, moving on when laying is almost complete. The male's territory can vary from 3 to 51 ha (7.4 to 126.0 acres), but averages 15.7 ha (39 acres). The female has a much smaller range, averaging only 5.5 ha (14 acres). A male will challenge an intruder by calling with his wings drooped and his head pointing forward. Usually the stranger moves off; if it stays, the two birds square up with heads and necks raised and the wings touching the ground. They then run around giving the growling call and lunging at each other. A real fight may ensue, with the birds leaping at each other and pecking, and sometimes kicking. Females play no part in defending the territory.

The female may be offered food by the male during courtship. He has a brief courtship display in which the neck is extended and the head held down, the tail is fanned, and the wings are spread with the tips touching the ground. He will then attempt to approach the female from behind, and then leap on her back to copulate. The nest is typically in grassland, sometimes in safer sites along a hedge, or near an isolated tree or bush, or in overgrown vegetation. Where grass is not tall enough at the start of the season, the first nest may be constructed in herby or marsh vegetation, with the second brood in hay. The second nest may also be at a higher altitude that the first, to take advantage of the later-developing grasses further up a hill. The nest, well hidden in the grass, is built in a scrape or hollow in the ground. It is made of woven coarse dry grass and other plants, and lined with finer grasses. Although nest construction is usually described as undertaken by the female, a recent aviary study found that in the captive population the male always built the nest.

The nest is 12–15 cm (4.7–5.9 in) in diameter and 3–4 cm (1.2–1.6 in) deep. The clutch is 6–14, usually 8–12 eggs; these are oval, slightly glossy, creamy or tinted with green, blue or grey, and blotched red-brown. They average 37 mm × 26 mm (1.5 in × 1.0 in) and weigh about 13–16 g (0.46–0.56 oz), of which 7% is shell. The eggs are laid at daily intervals, but second clutches may sometimes have two eggs added per day. Incubation is by the female only; her tendency to sit tight when disturbed, or wait until the last moment to flee, leads to many deaths during hay-cutting and harvesting. The eggs hatch together after 19–20 days, and the precocial chicks leave the nest within a day or two. They are fed by the female for three or four days, but can find their own food thereafter. The juveniles fledge after 34–38 days. The second brood is started about 42 days after the first, and the incubation period is slightly shorter at 16–18 days. The grown young may stay with the female until departure for Africa.

Nest success in undisturbed sites is high, at 80–90%, but much lower in fertilised meadows and on arable land. The method and timing of mowing is crucial; mechanized mowing can kill 38–95% of chicks in a given site, and losses average 50% of first brood chicks and somewhat less than 40% of second brood chicks. The influence of weather on chick survival is limited; although chick growth is faster in dry or warm weather, the effects are relatively small. Unlike many precocial species, chicks are fed by their mother to a greater or lesser extent until they become independent, and this may cushion them from adverse conditions. The number of live chicks hatched is more important than the weather, with lower survival in large broods. The annual adult survival rate is under 30%, although some individuals may live for 5–7 years.

=== Feeding ===
The corn crake is omnivorous, but mainly feeds on invertebrates, including earthworms, slugs and snails, spiders, beetles, dragonflies, grasshoppers and other insects. In the breeding areas, it is a predator of Sitona weevils, which infest legume crops. and in the past consumed large amounts of the former grassland pests, leatherjackets and wireworms. This crake will also eat small frogs and mammals, and plant material including grass seed and cereal grain. Its diet on the wintering grounds is generally similar, but includes locally available items such as termites, cockroaches and dung beetles. Food is taken from the ground, low-growing plants and from inside grass tussocks; the crake may search leaf litter with its bill, and run in pursuit of active prey. Hunting is normally in cover, but, particularly in the wintering areas, it will occasionally feed on grassy tracks or dirt roads. Indigestible material is regurgitated as 1 cm (0.39 in) pellets. Chicks are fed mainly on animal food, and when fully grown they may fly with the parents up to 6.4 km (4.0 mi) to visit supplementary feeding areas. As with other rails, grit is swallowed to help break up food in the stomach.

== Predators and parasites ==
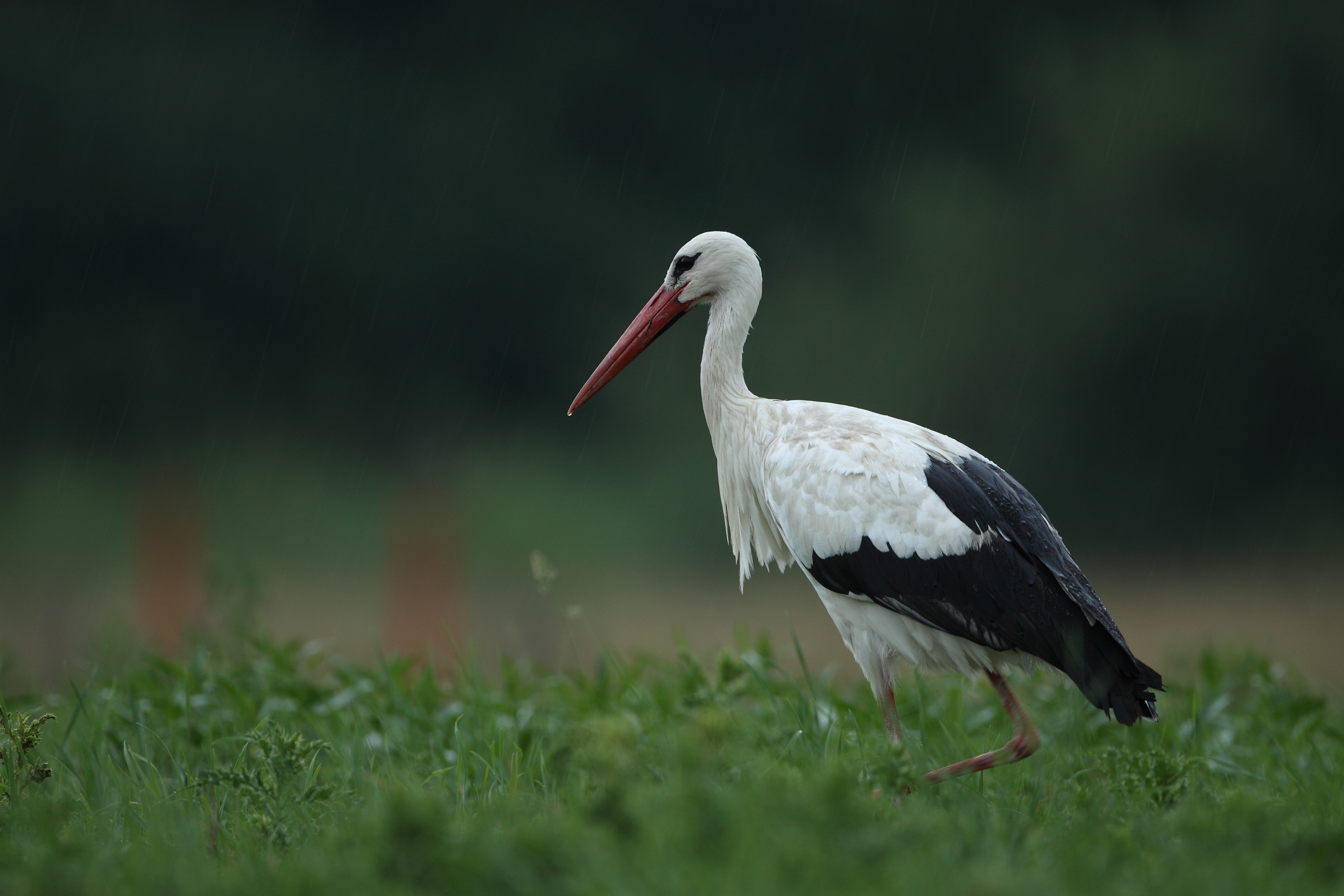
The white stork will feed on corncrake chicks exposed by early mowing.

Predators on the breeding grounds include feral and domestic cats, introduced American mink, feral ferrets, weasels, rats, otters and red foxes, and birds including the common buzzard and hooded crow. In Lithuania, the introduced raccoon dog has also been recorded as taking corn crakes. When chicks are exposed by rapid mowing, they may be taken by large birds including the white stork, harriers and other birds of prey, gulls and corvids. At undisturbed sites nests and broods are rarely attacked, as reflected in a high breeding success. There is a record of a corn crake on migration through Gabon being killed by a black sparrowhawk.

The widespread fluke Prosthogonimus ovatus, which lives in the oviducts of birds, has been recorded in the corn crake, as have the parasitic worm Plagiorchis elegans, the larvae of parasitic flies, and hard ticks of the genera Haemaphysalis and Ixodes.

During the reintroduction of corn crakes to England in the 2003 breeding season, enteritis and ill health in pre-release birds was due to bacteria of a pathogenic Campylobacter species. Subsequently, microbiology tests were done to detect infected individuals and to find the source of the bacteria in their environment.

== Status ==
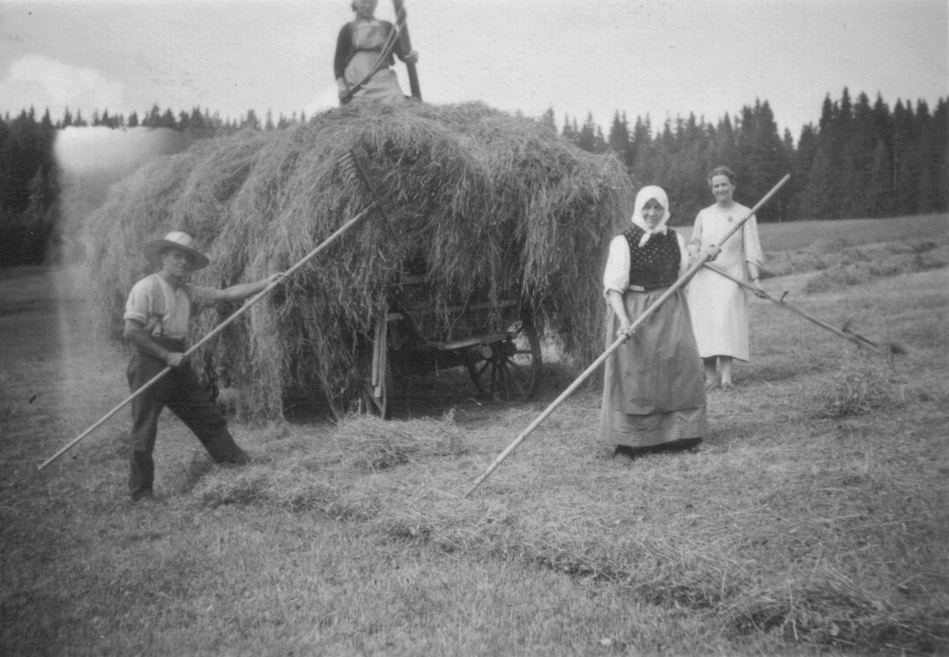
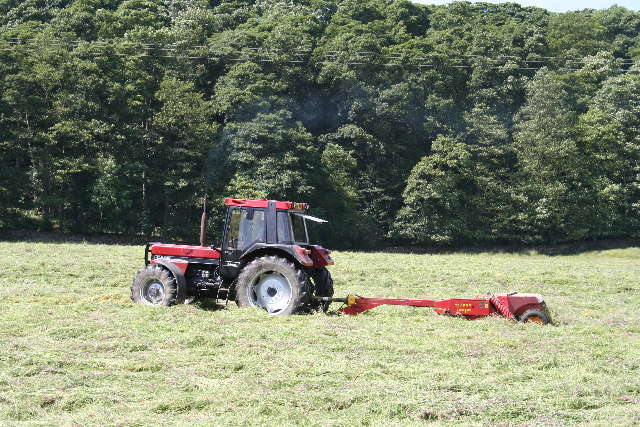
The move from manual to mechanised hay-making has seriously threatened the European breeding population.

Until 2010, despite a breeding range estimated at 12,400,000 km^{2} (4,800,000 sq mi), the corn crake was classified as near threatened on the IUCN Red List because of serious declines in Europe, but improved monitoring in Russia indicates that anticipated losses there have not occurred and numbers have remained stable or possibly increased. It is therefore now classed as least concern, since the major populations in Russia and Kazakhstan are not expected to change much in the short term. There are an estimated 1.3–2.0 million breeding pairs in Europe, three-quarters of which are in European Russia, and a further 515,000–1,240,000 pairs in Asiatic Russia; the total Eurasian population has been estimated at between 5.45 and 9.72 million individuals. In much of the western half of its range, there have been long-term declines that are expected to continue, although conservation measures have enabled numbers to grow in several countries, including a five-fold increase in Finland, and a doubling in the UK. In the Netherlands, there were 33 breeding territories in 1996, but this number had increased to at least 500 by 1998.

The breeding corn crake population had begun to decline in the 19th century, but the process gained pace after World War II. The main cause of the steep declines in much of Europe is the loss of nests and chicks from early mowing. Haymaking dates have moved forward in the past century due to faster crop growth, made possible by land drainage and the use of fertilisers, and the move from manual grass-cutting using scythes to mechanical mowers, at first horse-drawn and later pulled by tractors. Mechanisation also means that large areas can be cut quickly, leaving the crake with no alternative sites to raise either a first brood if suitable habitat has gone, or a replacement brood if the first nest is destroyed. The pattern of mowing, typically in a circular pattern from the outside of a field to its centre, gives little chance of escape for the chicks, which are also exposed to potential animal predators. Adults can often escape the mowers, although some incubating females sit tight on the nest, with fatal results.

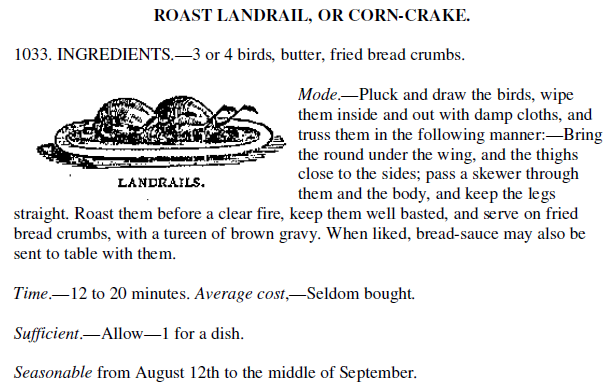
Mrs Beeton's recipe

Loss of habitat is the other major threat to the corn crake. Apart from the reduced suitability of drained and fertilised silage fields compared to traditional hay meadows, in western Europe the conversion of grassland to arable has been aided by subsidies, and further east the collapse of collective farming has led to the abandonment and lack of management of much land in this important breeding area. More localised threats include floods in spring, and disturbance by roads or wind farms. This bird is edible; when they were common in England, Mrs Beeton recommended roasting four on a skewer. More significant than direct hunting is the loss of many birds, up to 14,000 a year, in Egypt, where migrating birds are captured in nets set for the quail with which they often migrate. Although this may account for 0.5–2.7% of the European population, the losses to this form of hunting are less than when the targeted species were more numerous and predictable.

Most European countries have taken steps to conserve the corn crake and produce national management policies; there is also an overall European action plan. The focus of conservation effort is to monitor populations and ecology and to improve survival, principally through changing the timing and method of hay harvesting. Later cutting gives time for breeding to be completed, and leaving uncut strips at the edges of fields and cutting from the centre outwards reduces the casualties from mowing. Implementing these changes is predicted to stop the population decline if the measures are applied on a sufficiently large scale. Reduction of illegal hunting, and protection in countries where hunting is still allowed, are also conservation aims. Reintroduction of the corn crake is being attempted in England, and breeding sites are scheduled for protection in many other countries. Where breeding sites impinge on urban areas, there are cost implications, estimated in one German study at several million euros per corn crake. The corn crake does not appear to be seriously threatened on its wintering grounds and may benefit from deforestation, which creates more open habitats.

== In culture ==
Most rails are secretive wetland birds that have made little cultural impression, but as a formerly common farmland bird with a loud nocturnal call that sometimes led to disturbed sleep for rural dwellers, the corn crake has acquired a variety of folk names and some commemoration in literature.

=== Names ===
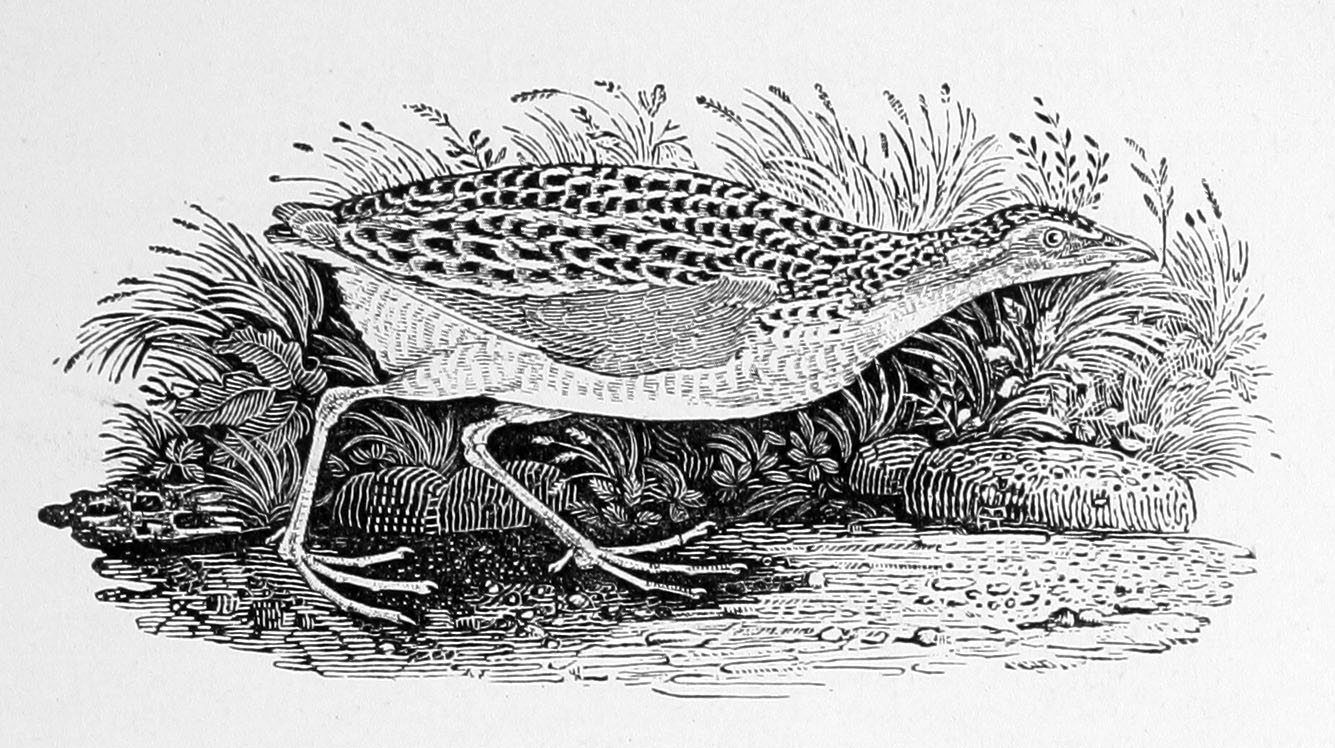
Land rail, by Thomas Bewick

The favoured name for this species among naturalists has changed over the years, with "landrail" and variants of "corncrake" being preferred at various times. "Crake gallinule" also had a period of popularity between 1768 and 1813. The originally Older Scots "cornecrake" was popularised by Thomas Bewick, who used this term in his 1797 A History of British Birds. Other Scots names include "corn scrack" and "quailzie"; the latter term, like "king of the quail", "grass quail", the French "roi de caille", and the German "Wachtelkönig" refer to the association with the small gamebird. Another name, "daker", has been variously interpreted as onomatopoeic, or derived from the Old Norse ager-hoene, meaning "cock of the field"; variants include "drake", "drake Hen" and "gorse drake".

=== In literature ===
Corn crakes are the subject of three stanzas of the seventeenth century poet Andrew Marvell's "Upon Appleton House", written in 1651 about the North Yorkshire country estate of Thomas Fairfax. The narrator depicts the scene of a mower cutting the grass, before his "whistling Sithe" unknowingly "carves the Rail". The farmhand draws out the scythe "all bloody from its breast" and "does the stroke detest". It continues with a stanza that demonstrates the problematic nature of the corn crake's nesting habits:

Unhappy Birds! What does it boot
To build below the Grass' Root;
When Lowness is unsafe as Hight,
And Chance o'ertakes, what scapeth spight?

John Clare, the nineteenth-century English poet based in Northamptonshire, wrote "The Landrail", a semi-comic piece which is primarily about the difficulty of seeing corn crakes – as opposed to hearing them. In the fourth verse he exclaims: "Tis like a fancy everywhere/A sort of living doubt". Clare wrote about corn crakes in his prose works too, and his writings help to clarify the distribution of this rail when it was far more widespread than now. The corn crake was becoming noticeably rarer with each summer when D.H. Lawrence was writing, especially so in the English East Midlands where his work is mostly set. In at least three Lawrence novels, one poem and a short story the call of the corn crake seems to serve as the soundtrack to particularly unsettled moments in the lives and minds of the protagonists.

The Finnish poet Eino Leino also wrote about the bird in his poem "Nocturne".

The corncrake's song rings in my ears,
above the rye a full moon sails

The proverbial use of the corn crake's call to describe someone with a grating or unmelodious voice is illustrated in the quotation "thanks to a wee woman with a voice like a corncrake who believed she was an apprentice angel". This usage dates from at least the first half of the nineteenth century, and continues through to the present.

=== In music ===
In The Pogues' "Lullaby of London" Shane MacGowan uses the corncrake's cry as a motif to illustrate his alienation in the city, he sings:

Though there is no lonesome corncrake's cry
Of sorrow and delight
You can hear the cars
And the shouts from bars
And the laughter and the fights

In The Decemberists "The Hazards of Love 2 (Wager All)" Colin Meloy references the corn crake's call, singing: "And we'll lie until the corn crake crows."

== Cited texts ==
- Koffijberg, Kees; Schaffer, Norbert (2006). International single species action plan for the conservation of the Corncrake Crex crex (PDF). Bonn, Germany: Convention on the Conservation of Migratory Species of Wild Animals (CMS) and Agreement on the Conservation of African-Eurasian Migratory Waterbirds (AEWA) (CMS Technical Series & AEWA Technical Series 14 & 9).
- Livezey, Bradley C. (1998). "A phylogenetic analysis of the Gruiformes (Aves) based on morphological characters, with an emphasis on the rails (Rallidae)". Philosophical Transactions of the Royal Society of London. 353 (1378): 2077–2151. doi:10.1098/rstb.1998.0353. PMC 1692427.
- Lockwood, W.B. (1984). Oxford Book of British Bird Names. Oxford: Oxford University Press. ISBN 0-19-214155-4.
- Taylor, Barry; van Perlo, Berl (2000). Rails. Robertsbridge, Sussex: Pica. ISBN 1-873403-59-3.
