= Georges Coutagne =

French biologist (1854–1928)

Georges Coutagne (20 September 1854, in Lyon – 18 August 1928, in Saint-Genis-Laval) was a French biologist, botanist, engineer, malacologist and naturalist.

From 1871 to 1913 he was a member of the Société linnéenne de Lyon; in 1912 he was named vice-president of the Société d'agriculture de Lyon.

== Partial list of works ==
- De l'influence de la temperature sur le développement des végétaux, 1882 - The influence of temperature on the development of plants.
- Recherches sur le polymorphisme des mollusques de France, 1894 - Research of polymorphism involving mollusks of France.
- Recherches experimentales sur l'hérédité chez les vers à soie, 1901 - Experimental research on heredity in silkworms.
