= Revett Sheppard =

English malacologist

The Reverend Revett Sheppard (1778, in Campsey Ash – 1830, in Wrabness) was an English malacologist. He was a Fellow of the Linnean Society. He described several new non-marine species of mollusks.

Sheppard was admitted to Gonville and Caius College, Cambridge in 1796, graduating B.A. in 1801, M.A, in 1804. He was ordained deacon in 1804, and priest in 1805. He was initially a curate at Nacton with Levington, then in 1809 perpetual curate at Willisham, both in Suffolk. He moved in 1814, as a curate, to Offton with Little Bricett (again Suffolk) and Somersham (Cambridgeshire). He went to Wrabness in Essex, still as curate, in 1818. His final living, from 1825, was a rector of Thwaite, Suffolk.

He was a friend of the entomologist William Kirby.

== Publications ==
Sheppard's publications include:

- Sheppard, R., 1822. On two new British species of Mytilus. Transactions of the Linnean Society of London 13: 83-87.
- Sheppard, R., 1823. Descriptions of seven new British land and freshwater shells, with observations on many other species, including a list of such as have been found in the county of Suffolk. Transactions of the Linnean Society of London 14: 148-170.
