= Prosthogonimidae =

Scientific classification
- Kingdom: Animalia
- Phylum: Platyhelminthes
- Class: Trematoda
- Order: Plagiorchiida
- Suborder: Xiphidiata
- Superfamily: Microphalloidea
- Family: Prosthogonimidae; Lühe, 1909

Genera
- See text

Family of flukes

The Prosthogonimidae are a family of trematodes. They are part of the huge of the suborder Xiphidiata in the order Plagiorchiida. The adults of these parasites occur in the bursa of Fabricius, caecum, cloaca, liver, oviduct and sometimes even under the nictitating membrane of vertebrates and particularly birds.

Selected genera are:

- Cephalotrema
- Mediogonimus Woodhead & Malewitz, 1936
- Ophthalmogonimus
- Prosthogonimus Lühe, 1899
- previously recognized genus Schistogonimus Lühe, 1909 is newly considered a junior synonym of Prosthogonimus Lühe, 1899
